= Castleton Spartans =

- University: Vermont State University - Castleton Campus
- Nickname: Spartans
- NCAA: Division III
- Conference: Little East Conference; Eastern Collegiate Football Conference; New England Hockey Conference; Eastern College Athletic Conference
- Athletic director: Tim Barrett
- Location: Castleton, Vermont
- Varsity teams: 28 (14 men's, 14 women's)
- Football stadium: Dave Wolk Stadium
- Basketball arena: Glenbrook Gym
- Ice hockey arena: Spartan Arena
- Baseball stadium: Spartan Fields
- Softball stadium: Spartan Fields
- Soccer stadium: Dave Wolk Stadium
- Lacrosse stadium: Dave Wolk Stadium
- Tennis venue: Castleton Tennis Courts
- Volleyball arena: Glenbrook Gym
- Wrestling arena: Glenbrook Gym
- Colors: Castleton green, dark gray, and white
- Mascot: Sparty
- Website: castletonsports.com
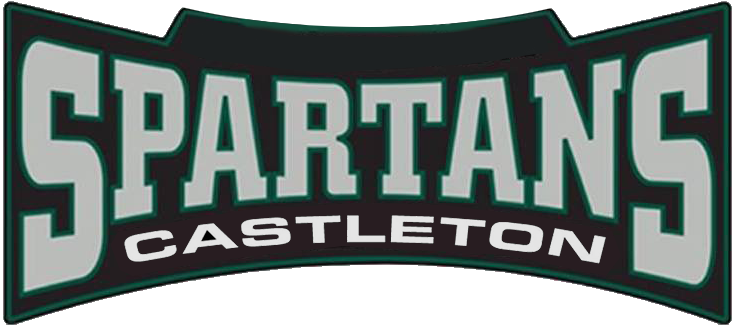

The Castleton Spartans are the athletic teams that represent the Castleton campus of Vermont State University. The Spartans compete in 28 National Collegiate Athletic Association (NCAA) Division III intercollegiate sports.

== Conference affiliations ==
- Mayflower Conference – 1987–88 to 2000–01
- North Atlantic Conference – 2001–02 to 2017–18
- Little East Conference – 2018–19 to Present

== Sports sponsored ==
Men's sports	Women's sports
Alpine Skiing	Alpine Skiing
Baseball	Basketball
Basketball	Cross Country
Cross Country	Field Hockey
Football	Ice Hockey
Golf	Lacrosse
Ice Hockey	Nordic Skiing
Lacrosse	Rugby Union
Nordic Skiing	Soccer
Soccer	Softball
Tennis	Tennis
Track and Field^{1}	Track and Field^{1}
Wrestling	Volleyball
^{1} – includes both indoor and outdoor

== National championships ==
=== Team ===
Sport	Association	Division	Year	Runner-up	Score
Men's soccer (1)	NAIA	Single	1963	Earlham	—
Men's Nordic Skiing	USCSA		2019	Clarkson	
Men's Nordic Skiing	USCSA		2020	St. Olaf	
Women's Nordic Skiing	USCSA		2020	Wyoming	
Men's Alpine Skiing	USCSA		2023	Rocky Mountain	
Men's Alpine Skiing	USCSA		2024	Rocky Mountain	

== Individual programs ==
=== Men's basketball ===
From 1983 to 1986, Stan Van Gundy (later head coach of the Orlando Magic and the Detroit Pistons) coached Men's Basketball at Castleton.

=== Men's soccer ===
Castleton's men's soccer team were declared 1963 NAIA co-champions (along with Earlham College of Indiana) after the championship and consolation games at Frostburg State University in Maryland were cancelled due to snow.

=== Ice hockey ===
The men's and women's Castleton Spartans hockey teams compete at the Spartan Arena in the site of the former Diamond Run Mall in Rutland. They compete in the New England Hockey Conference (NEHC). Beginning in 2025-26, the Spartans will join the Little East Conference for Ice Hockey, departing the NEHC.

=== Football ===
The Castleton Spartans football team represents the school in NCAA Division III. The team has been coached by Tony Volpone since 2014. Volpone replaced Marc Klatt, who resigned in December 2013. It has been part of the Eastern Collegiate Football Conference (ECFC) since its inaugural season in 2009.
