= Texas State Highway 123 =

State highway in Texas, United States

State Highway 123
- SH 123; mainline in red, business routes in blue

Route information
- Maintained by TxDOT
- Length: 71.2 mi (114.6 km)
- Existed: by 1933–present

Major junctions
- South end: US 181 / Bus. US 181 / SH 80 in Karnes City
- US 87 in Stockdale; US 90 in Seguin; I-10 in Seguin
- North end: I-35 / Loop 82 in San Marcos

Location
- Country: United States
- State: Texas
- Counties: Karnes, Wilson, Guadalupe, and Hays

Highway system
- Highways in Texas; Interstate; US; State; Former; Toll; Loops; Spurs; FM/RM; Park; Rec
← SH 122	→ SH 124

State Highway 123 (SH 123) is a north–south state highway in Texas, United States, that connects U.S Route 181 (US 181) in Karnes City with Interstate 35 (I-35) in San Marcos. The route was initially proposed in 1927 and has had minimal changes to its routing since then.

== Route description ==
SH 123 begins at an intersection with US 181 just south of Karnes City and proceeds northward along the town's eastern edge. The route intersects the Business Route of US 181 and Texas State Highway 80 as it passes through town. The road continues north through farmlands before reaching an intersection with US Route 87 in Stockdale. The route continues north through ranchlands until Seguin. Reaching Seguin, Texas State Highway 46 begins, peeling off to the northwest toward New Braunfels. SH 123 continues around the eastern edge of Seguin, where it is known locally as "the Bypass", and there it intersects US 90 Alternate, US 90, and Interstate 10. The highway continues north, reaching its northern terminus at Interstate 35 in San Marcos.

== History ==
The route was initially proposed on April 12, 1927 from Stockdale to San Marcos with a proposed extension south to Karnes City. On September 21, 1931, it was rerouted to end in Floresville. On August 4, 1932, it was restored to Karnes City, and the old route was renumbered as SH 168 (now SH 97). On November 6, 1934, it was rerouted to Yorktown. On February 16, 1935, its south end was changed back to Karnes City. On November 18, 1938, SH 123 Loop was designated in Karnes City. On September 26, 1939, SH 123 Loop was renumbered as Loop 17. Paving was completed in the mid-1940s.

== Major intersections ==
County	Location	mi	km	Destinations	Notes
Karnes		0.0	0.0	US 181 / Bus. US 181 ends / SH 80 ends – Kenedy, Corpus Christi, San Antonio	Southern terminus: southern end of US 181 Bus. / SH 80 concurrency
Karnes	Karnes City	1.4	2.3	Bus. US 181 north	Northern end of US 181 Bus. concurrency
Karnes	Karnes City	1.9	3.1	SH 80 north – Helena, Gillett	Northern end of SH 80 concurrency
Karnes		2.5	4.0	Bus. SH 123 south – Karnes City	
Karnes		6.3	10.1	FM 81 east – Panna Maria	Southern end of FM 81 concurrency
Karnes		6.5	10.5	FM 81 west – Hobson	Northern end of FM 81 concurrency
Karnes	Pawelekville	13.4	21.6	FM 887 – Falls City, Gillett	
Wilson		17.4	28.0	FM 541 west – Kosciusko, Poth	
Wilson		20.9	33.6	FM 1347 – Kosciusko, Denhawken	
Wilson		23.9	38.5	FM 537 west – Floresville	
Wilson	Stockdale	25.4– 25.5	40.9– 41.0	US 87 / SH 97 to SH 119 – Floresville, San Antonio, Nixon	interchange
Wilson	Stockdale	26.3	42.3	Bus. US 87 (Main Street) – Stockdale Business District, Pandora, Nixon	
Wilson		28.6	46.0	FM 3335 east to FM 1107	
Wilson		35.9	57.8	FM 1681 east – Nixon	
Guadalupe		45.6	73.4	FM 477 east	
Guadalupe	Seguin	46.4	74.7	SH 46 north / Bus. SH 123 north – Seguin, New Braunfels	
Guadalupe	Seguin	49.3	79.3	FM 466 (Eastwood Drive) to SH 80 – Seguin	
Guadalupe	Seguin	49.7	80.0	US 90 Alt. (Court Street) – Seguin, Gonzales, Texas Lutheran University, Sebastopol Historical Park	
Guadalupe	Seguin	50.9	81.9	US 90 – Seguin, Luling	
Guadalupe	Seguin	51.9– 52.0	83.5– 83.7	I-10 – San Antonio, Houston	I-10 exit 610
Guadalupe	Seguin	53.5	86.1	Bus. SH 123 south – Seguin	
Guadalupe	Seguin	53.7	86.4	FM 20 east – Fentress	
Guadalupe	Geronimo	57.3	92.2	FM 2623 east – Fentress	
Guadalupe		59.4	95.6	FM 758 west – Barbarosa, New Braunfels Municipal Airport, Central Texas Technology Center	
Guadalupe		60.4	97.2	FM 1339 east – Staples	
Guadalupe	Zorn	62.2	100.1	FM 1101 west – New Braunfels	
Guadalupe		64.5	103.8	FM 1979 east – Martindale	
Guadalupe		66.1	106.4	FM 1978 east – Redwood	
Hays	San Marcos	68.5– 68.6	110.2– 110.4	FM 110 west	
Hays	San Marcos	69.6	112.0	RM 12 north (Wonderworld Drive)	
Hays	San Marcos	70.9	114.1	FM 621 east – Staples State Fish Hatchery	
Hays	San Marcos	71.1– 71.2	114.4– 114.6	I-35 / Loop 82 – San Antonio, Austin	Northern terminus
1.000 mi = 1.609 km; 1.000 km = 0.621 mi: Concurrency terminus

== Business routes ==
The route has two business segments: Business 123-B (largely on Austin Street) through historic downtown Seguin and Business 123-D in Karnes City.

== See also ==
- List of state highways in Texas
