= Lake Dunlap, Texas =

- census-designated place
- Location within Texas
- Coordinates: 29°40′06″N 98°04′38″W
- Country: United States
- State: Texas
- County: Guadalupe

Area
  - Total: 1.69 sq mi (4.4 km^{2})
  - Land: 1.55 sq mi (4.0 km^{2})
  - Water: 0.15 sq mi (0.39 km^{2})
- Elevation: 637 ft (194 m)

Population (2010)
  - Total: 1,934
  - Density: 1,250/sq mi (482/km^{2})
- Time zone: UTC-6 (Central)
  - Summer (DST): UTC-5 (Central)
- ZIP code: 78130
- Area code: 830
- GNIS feature ID: 2586946

Lake Dunlap is a census-designated place in Guadalupe County, Texas, United States. As of the 2020 census, Lake Dunlap had a population of 1,981. It is part of the San Antonio–New Braunfels metropolitan area.

The community is named after the former Lake Dunlap, a small reservoir on the Guadalupe River. In 2019, the dam failed, draining the lake. The repair was completed in August 2023, and the lake fully restored by the end of October that year.

== Geography ==
Lake Dunlap is located along Farm to Market Road 725 in northwestern Guadalupe County, approximately eight miles northwest of Seguin. The city of New Braunfels borders Lake Dunlap to the north and west.

According to the United States Census Bureau, the CDP has a total area of 1.69 square miles (4.4 km^{2}), of which 1.55 square miles (4.0 km^{2}) is land and 0.15 square miles (0.39 km^{2}) is water.

== History ==
Residential development of the lakeside community dates back to the 1970s. The population has steadily increased from around 200 in 1980, to 500 in 1990, 1,000 in 2000, and 1,934 in 2010.

== Demographics ==
Historical population
Census	Pop.	Note	%±
2010	1,934		—
2020	1,981		2.4%
U.S. Decennial Census; 1850–1900 1910; 1920 1930 1940; 1950 1960 1970; 1980 1990 2000; 2010 2020

Lake Dunlap first appeared as a census designated place in the 2010 U.S. census formed from area detached from New Braunfels city and additional area.

=== 2020 census ===
Lake Dunlap CDP, Texas – Racial and ethnic composition Note: the US Census treats Hispanic/Latino as an ethnic category. This table excludes Latinos from the racial categories and assigns them to a separate category. Hispanics/Latinos may be of any race.
Race / Ethnicity (NH = Non-Hispanic)	Pop 2010	Pop 2020	% 2010	% 2020
White alone (NH)	1,213	1,083	62.72%	54.67%
Black or African American alone (NH)	38	18	1.96%	0.91%
Native American or Alaska Native alone (NH)	7	9	0.36%	0.45%
Asian alone (NH)	1	1	0.05%	0.05%
Native Hawaiian or Pacific Islander alone (NH)	0	0	0.00%	0.00%
Other race alone (NH)	0	7	0.00%	0.35%
Mixed race or Multiracial (NH)	13	73	0.67%	3.69%
Hispanic or Latino (any race)	662	790	34.23%	39.88%
Total	1,934	1,981	100.00%	100.00%

=== 2010 census ===
At the 2010 United States census there were 1,934 people, 684 households, and 501 families residing in the CDP. The racial makeup of the CDP was 87.3% White (62.7% Non-Hispanic White), 1.1% Native American, 2.1% African American, 0.1% Asian, 6.4% from other races, and 2.2% from two or more races. Hispanic or Latino of any race were 34.2% of the population.

== Education ==
The New Braunfels Independent School District (NBISD) serves students living in Lake Dunlap. Zoned campuses include Klein Road Elementary School (grades PK-5), New Braunfels Middle School (grades 6-8), New Braunfels High School Ninth Grade Center (grade 9), and New Braunfels High School (grades 10-12).
