= Braunfels (disambiguation) =

Braunfels (German: brown crag) may refer to:

- Braunfels, Germany
- New Braunfels, Texas
- New Braunfels Municipal Airport
- Solms-Braunfels (1258–1806), principality of the Holy Roman Empire
  - Amalia of Solms-Braunfels (1602–1675), German noblewoman
  - Prince Carl of Solms-Braunfels (1812–1875), German prince
- Walter Braunfels (1882–1954), German composer
