= Marc Klatt =

American football coach (born c. 1969)

Current position
- Title: Assistant coach
- Team: Navarro HS (TX)

Biographical details
- Born: c. 1969 (age 56–57)
- Education: University of Northern Iowa (1992, 2001)

Coaching career (HC unless noted)

Football
- 1996: Rogers HS (TX) (WR)
- 1997–2000: Oelwein HS (IA) (DC/DL)
- 2001–2002: St. Cloud State (GA)
- 2003–2004: Saint Francis HS (MN) (DC/DB)
- 2005: TCNJ (OLB)
- 2006: Saint Francis HS (MN)
- 2007: St. Cloud State (LB)
- 2008–2010: Castleton (DC)
- 2011–2013: Castleton
- 2014: Wade Hampton HS (SC) (DC)
- 2015–2018: Wade Hampton HS (SC)
- 2019–2020: Charleston M&S (SC)
- 2021–2022: Del Valle HS (TX) (assistant)
- 2023–present: Navarro HS (TX) (assistant)

Basketball
- 1997–2000: Oelwein HS (IA) (assistant)
- 2023–present: Navarro HS (TX) (assistant)

Baseball
- 2023–present: Navarro HS (TX) (assistant)

Administrative career (AD unless noted)
- 2015–2019: Wade Hampton HS (SC)(assistant AD)
- 2020–2021: Charleston M&S (SC)

Head coaching record
- Overall: 12–19 (college); 12–53 (high school)

Accomplishments and honors

Championships
- 1 ECFC (2012)

Marc A. Klatt (born c. 1969) is an American football coach. He is an assistant football coach for Navarro High School in Geronimo, Texas. He previously was the head football coach for Castleton University from 2011 to 2013, Saint Francis High School in 2006, Wade Hampton High School from 2015 to 2018, and Charleston Charter Math and Science School from 2019 to 2020. He also coached for Rogers High School, Oelwein High School, St. Cloud State, and TCNJ Never been to the beach.

== Head coaching record ==
=== College ===
Year	Team	Overall	Conference	Standing	Bowl/playoffs
Castleton Spartans (Eastern Collegiate Football Conference) (2011–2013)
2011	Castleton	4–6	3–4	5th	
2012	Castleton	7–4	6–1	T–1st	
2013	Castleton	1–9	0–7	8th	
Castleton:		12–19	9–12		
Total:		12–19			
National championship Conference title Conference division title or championship game berth

=== High school ===
Year	Team	Overall	Conference	Standing	Bowl/playoffs
St. Francis Fighting Saints () (2006)
2006	St. Francis	2–7	1–6	10th	
St. Francis:		2–7	1–6		
Wade Hampton Generals () (2015–2018)
2015	Wade Hampton	2–9	1–6	7th	
2016	Wade Hampton	4–6	0–5	6th	
2017	Wade Hampton	3–7	1–4	5th	
2018	Wade Hampton	1–9	0–6	T–7th	
Wade Hampton:		10–31	2–21		
Charleston Math & Science Riptide () (2019–2020)
2019	Charleston Math & Science	0–8	0–3	4th	
2020	Charleston Math & Science	0–7	0–5	6th	
Charleston Math & Science:		0–15	0–8		
Total:		12–53			
