= Concrete, Guadalupe County, Texas =

Ghost town in Guadalupe County, Texas

Coordinates: 29.3809°N 98.0977°W

Concrete (originally known as Bethesda) is a ghost town in southwestern Guadalupe County, Texas, United States, alongside the present Farm to Market Road 775, approximately 2 miles (3 km) north of La Vernia and 6 miles (10 km) south of New Berlin.
