= Staples, Texas =

- City
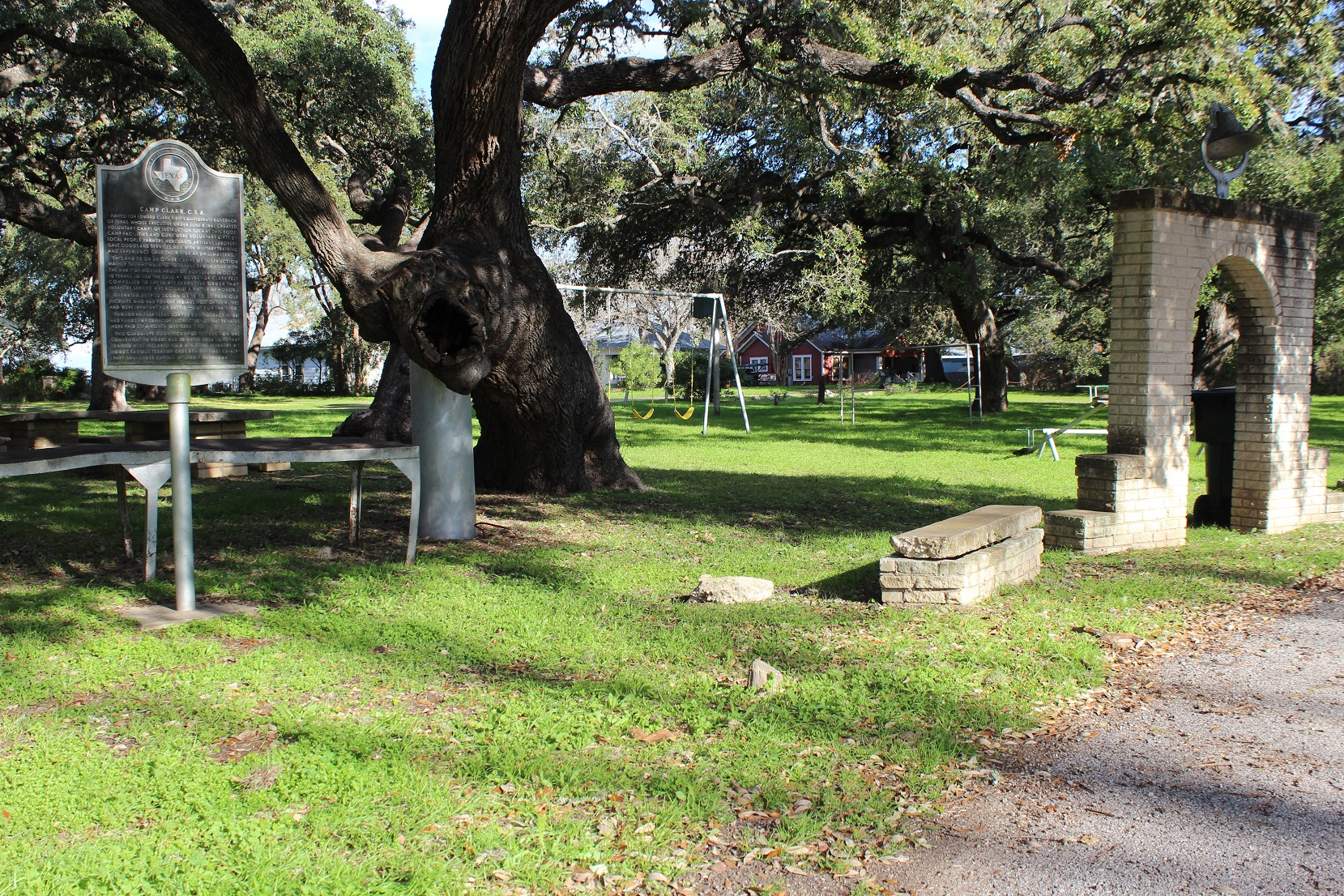

- Location within Texas Location within the United States
- Coordinates: 29°45′43″N 97°49′20″W
- Country: United States
- State: Texas
- County: Guadalupe
- Incorporated: 2008

Area
  - Total: 1.50 sq mi (3.89 km^{2})
  - Land: 1.50 sq mi (3.88 km^{2})
  - Water: 0.0039 sq mi (0.01 km^{2})
- Elevation: 525 ft (160 m)

Population (2020)
  - Total: 193
  - Density: 129/sq mi (49.7/km^{2})
- ZIP code: 78670
- Area codes: 210, 726 (planned)
- FIPS code: 48-70052
- GNIS feature ID: 2633299
- Website: www.cityofstaples.com

Staples is a city in northeastern Guadalupe County, Texas, United States. The population is approximately 193 as of the 2020 census and it is part of the San Antonio Metropolitan Statistical Area.

== History ==
The area where Staples is located was first settled in 1852. A Confederate training camp was located in the area during the Civil War and in 1867 a cotton gin was opened on the San Marcos River in the town.

In 1871, Civil War veteran John Douglas Staples opened a store in the town. A post office was opened in 1879 under the name Staples Store, which was changed to Staples in 1891. The town experienced rapid population growth during the 1890s, increasing from 45 in 1890 to 150 by 1896.

In an election held on May 10, 2008, the residents of Staples voted to incorporate the community as a city. A total of 125 votes were cast, with 87 (69.6%) in favor of incorporation and 38 (30.4%) against.

The city held its first municipal election on November 4, 2008. Eddie Daffern, an organizer of the incorporation effort, was elected unopposed as Mayor. A total of seven candidates ran for the five Alderman positions. Those elected include Carol Wester, who received 70 votes, followed by Ronnie Clark with 67 votes, Bert "Bubba" Reinke and William A. York—both winning 52 votes, and Shaun Seale with 40.

The Staples Police Department disbanded in August 2026 following a Texas Commission on Law Enforcement investigation that found that the department failed to meet minimum training standards.

== Geography ==
Staples is located in northeastern Guadalupe County, just west of the San Marcos River, which forms the border with Caldwell County. It is 11 miles (18 km) southeast of San Marcos, 21 miles (34 km) northeast of Seguin, the Guadalupe County seat, 16 miles (26 km) northwest of Luling, and 16 miles southwest of Lockhart. Texas State Highway 130 runs through the southern part of Staples, providing a new freeway route between Austin, 41 miles (66 km) to the north, and San Antonio, 56 miles (90 km) to the southwest.

According to the U.S. Census Bureau, the city of Staples has a total area of 1.5 square miles (3.9 km^{2}), of which 0.004 square miles (0.01 km^{2}), or 0.30%, are water.

== Demographics ==
Historical population
Census	Pop.	Note	%±
1870	30		—
1880	45		50.0%
1890	125		177.8%
1900	150		20.0%
1920	120		—
1930	100		−16.7%
1940	250		150.0%
1950	150		−40.0%
1960	140		−6.7%
1970	70		−50.0%
1980	65		−7.1%
1990	75		15.4%
2000	350		366.7%
2010	267		−23.7%
2020	193		−27.7%
U.S. Decennial Census

== Education ==
Students living in Staples are zoned to schools in the San Marcos Consolidated Independent School District.

== Notable people ==
- Pete Compton (1889–1978), Major League Baseball player
