= Redwood, Texas =

- Unincorporated community
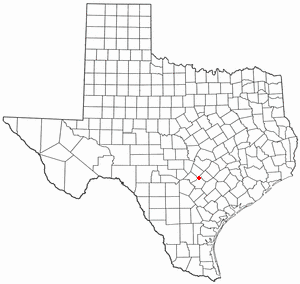
- Location of Redwood, Texas

- Coordinates: 29°48′36″N 97°54′37″W
- Country: United States
- State: Texas
- County: Guadalupe

Area
  - Total: 6.5 sq mi (16.9 km^{2})
  - Land: 6.4 sq mi (16.7 km^{2})
  - Water: 0.077 sq mi (0.2 km^{2})
- Elevation: 554 ft (169 m)

Population (2020)
  - Total: 4,003
  - Density: 673/sq mi (259.7/km^{2})
- Time zone: UTC-6 (Central (CST))
  - Summer (DST): UTC-5 (CDT)
- ZIP code: 78666
- Area codes: 512 and 737
- FIPS code: 48-61352
- GNIS feature ID: 2409156

Redwood is an unincorporated community and census-designated place (CDP) in Guadalupe County, Texas, United States. The population was 4,003 at the 2020 census, a decline from the figure of 4,338 tabulated in 2010. It is part of the San Antonio Metropolitan Statistical Area.

== Geography ==
Redwood is located in the northeast corner of Guadalupe County and is bordered to the north by Hays County and the city of San Marcos. Texas State Highway 123 forms the western border of Redwood; the highway leads north 5 miles (8 km) into San Marcos and south 16 miles (26 km) to Seguin, the Guadalupe County seat.

According to the United States Census Bureau, the Redwood CDP has a total area of 6.5 square miles (16.9 km^{2}), of which 6.4 square miles (16.7 km^{2}) are land and 0.1 square miles (0.2 km^{2}), or 1.02%, are water.

== Demographics ==
Historical population
Census	Pop.	Note	%±
2000	3,586		—
2010	4,338		21.0%
2020	4,003		−7.7%
U.S. Decennial Census; 1850–1900 1910; 1920 1930 1940; 1950 1960 1970; 1980 1990 2000; 2010

Redwood first appeared as a census designated place in the 2000 U.S. census.

=== Racial and ethnic composition ===
Redwood CDP, Texas – Racial and ethnic composition Note: the US Census treats Hispanic/Latino as an ethnic category. This table excludes Latinos from the racial categories and assigns them to a separate category. Hispanics/Latinos may be of any race.
Race / Ethnicity (NH = Non-Hispanic)	Pop 2000	Pop 2010	Pop 2020	% 2000	% 2010	% 2020
White alone (NH)	488	416	362	13.61%	9.59%	9.04%
Black or African American alone (NH)	47	62	36	1.31%	1.43%	0.90%
Native American or Alaska Native alone (NH)	7	3	1	0.20%	0.07%	0.02%
Asian alone (NH)	4	10	20	0.11%	0.23%	0.50%
Native Hawaiian or Pacific Islander alone (NH)	1	4	0	0.03%	0.09%	0.00%
Other race alone (NH)	5	10	2	0.14%	0.23%	0.05%
Mixed race or Multiracial (NH)	16	13	46	0.45%	0.30%	1.15%
Hispanic or Latino (any race)	3,018	3,820	3,536	84.16%	88.06%	88.33%
Total	3,586	4,338	4,003	100.00%	100.00%	100.00%

=== 2020 census ===
As of the 2020 census, Redwood had a population of 4,003. The median age was 32.4 years. 27.9% of residents were under the age of 18 and 11.0% of residents were 65 years of age or older. For every 100 females there were 108.1 males, and for every 100 females age 18 and over there were 104.2 males age 18 and over.

77.6% of residents lived in urban areas, while 22.4% lived in rural areas.

There were 1,116 households in Redwood, of which 43.8% had children under the age of 18 living in them. Of all households, 49.1% were married-couple households, 19.8% were households with a male householder and no spouse or partner present, and 22.0% were households with a female householder and no spouse or partner present. About 19.3% of all households were made up of individuals and 7.9% had someone living alone who was 65 years of age or older.

There were 1,215 housing units, of which 8.1% were vacant. The homeowner vacancy rate was 0.5% and the rental vacancy rate was 9.6%.

=== 2000 census ===
As of the census of 2000, there were 3,586 people, 901 households, and 785 families residing in the CDP. The population density was 610.6 inhabitants per square mile (235.8/km^{2}). There were 946 housing units at an average density of 161.1 per square mile (62.2/km^{2}). The racial makeup of the CDP was 48.13% White, 1.53% African American, 0.89% Native American, 0.11% Asian, 0.03% Pacific Islander, 44.73% from other races, and 4.57% from two or more races. Hispanic or Latino of any race were 84.16% of the population.

There were 901 households, out of which 58.7% had children under the age of 18 living with them, 63.9% were married couples living together, 13.4% had a female householder with no husband present, and 12.8% were non-families. 7.9% of all households were made up of individuals, and 2.1% had someone living alone who was 65 years of age or older. The average household size was 3.98 and the average family size was 4.16.

In the CDP, the population was spread out, with 39.1% under the age of 18, 11.2% from 18 to 24, 32.5% from 25 to 44, 14.2% from 45 to 64, and 2.9% who were 65 years of age or older. The median age was 25 years. For every 100 females, there were 110.4 males. For every 100 females age 18 and over, there were 107.3 males.

The median income for a household in the CDP was $30,132, and the median income for a family was $31,559. Males had a median income of $20,918 versus $14,816 for females. The per capita income for the CDP was $8,525. About 16.6% of families and 18.5% of the population were below the poverty line, including 20.9% of those under age 18 and none of those age 65 or over.
