= La Vernia High School =

Location
- 225 Bluebonnet Rd. La Vernia, Texas 78121-9554; United States; 29.3521°N 98.1233°W

Information
- School type: Public high school
- School district: La Vernia Independent School District
- Principal: Brandi Hanselka
- Teaching staff: 63.39 (FTE)
- Grades: 9-12
- Enrollment: 1,072 (2025-2026)
- Student to teacher ratio: 17.76
- Colors: Blue & White
- Athletics conference: UIL Class AAAA
- Mascot: Bear
- Website: hs.lvisd.org/o/lvhighschool

La Vernia High School is a public high school located in La Vernia, Texas (USA). It is part of the La Vernia Independent School District located in northern Wilson County and classified as a 4A school by the UIL. In 2015, the school was rated "Met Standard" by the Texas Education Agency.

In 2017 the school was affected by a scandal on the varsity football team where younger students were raped during hazing rituals and were not stopped by the coaches.

== Athletics ==
=== Sports ===
The La Vernia Bears compete in these sports

- Volleyball
- Cross Country
- Football
- Basketball
- Powerlifting
- Soccer
- Golf
- Tennis
- Track
- Baseball
- Softball

=== State Titles ===
- Cross Country -
  - 3rd Place, 2016(4A)
- Volleyball -
  - 2nd Place, 2025 (4A)

=== Scandals ===
In March 2017, an investigation into the La Vernia Football program was opened as a result of reports of sexual assault within the football program. Thirteen high school student athletes were arrested in connection to the sexual assault case.

== Academics ==
La Vernia High School competes in all academic events, with consistent district championships.

=== State Titles ===
- Computer Science -
  - 1992(3A)

== Fine Arts ==
La Vernia High School currently fields a Marching Band, three concert bands, a choir, and a One Act Play Troupe.

=== Concert Band ===
La Vernia High School has two concert bands which includes:

- the Wind Ensemble
- the Symphonic Band

=== Marching Band ===
The La Vernia Mighty Bear Band participated in the 2011 3A UIL State Marching Championships and placed 16th. The La Vernia Mighty Bear Band is also known to be "The Best Band In The Land".

=== State Titles ===
- One Act Play -
  - 1984(2A)

== Notable alumni ==
- Kevin Kotzur (2008), basketball player who plays in Japan
