= Clear Springs, Texas =

Neighborhood in New Braunfels, Texas, United States

- Neighborhood
- Location within Texas Location within the United States
- Coordinates: 29°40′34″N 98°03′35″W
- Country: United States
- State: Texas
- County: Guadalupe
- Elevation: 620 ft (190 m)
- Time zone: UTC-6 (Central (CST))
  - Summer (DST): UTC-5 (CDT)
- Area code: 830
- GNIS feature ID: 1384862

Clear Springs is a historic settlement and former unincorporated community that is now a neighborhood in New Braunfels, Texas, United States. As part of New Braunfels, it is part of the San Antonio Metropolitan Statistical Area. It shares its name with the nearby Clear Springs Air Force Base.

== History ==
German settlers first immigrated to the area in the 1840s. Clear Springs was named for the natural springs water source for the settlement, which is now covered by Lake Dunlap. The location on which Clear Springs sits had been surveyed by James Bowie.

In 1873, a cotton gin and general store were built for the processing, storage, and sale of cotton and goods. Wagon loads of cotton were brought from the region to the gin be to be weighed, sold and processed. The community had a post office in 1874 and called the location Bernhardsville. In 1875, the name was officially changed to Clear Springs.

In the 1890s, Clear Springs hosted the general store, cotton gin, and a population of 100. The post office was closed in 1906; however, the residents stayed on to support the community. In later years, the store was incorporated into a dance hall and saloon. The dance hall became a local favorite, as it was the only establishment of the kind for several miles. Clear Springs had two businesses and a school in 1946. The school was consolidated with the New Braunfels school district in the 1950s. In 1990, several businesses as well as a church served a population of 60.

The historical Clear Springs Hall and Store now houses Clear Springs Restaurant. This establishment has tried to preserve the German small town heritage and historical atmosphere of the structure itself.

Clear Springs is located just off SH 46, at the intersection of SH 46 and FM 758, nine miles northwest of Seguin in northwestern Guadalupe County.

== Geography ==
Clear Springs is located at 29°40′34″N 98°03′35″W (29.6760591, -98.0597292. This is about 30 miles (48 km) east of Downtown San Antonio and 50 miles (80 km) south of Austin.
