= Tyler Higley =

American football coach (born c. 1995)

Current position
- Title: Head coach
- Team: Castleton
- Conference: NJAC
- Record: 5–15

Biographical details
- Born: c. 1995 (age 30–31); Vernon, Vermont, U.S.
- Education: Castleton University (2017, 2019)

Playing career
- 2013–2016: Castleton
- Positions: Quarterback, defensive back

Coaching career (HC unless noted)
- 2017–2019: Castleton (GA/DB)
- 2020–2021: Western New England (ST/DB)
- 2022–2023: Castleton (DC/RC)
- 2024–present: Castleton

Head coaching record
- Overall: 5–15

Accomplishments and honors

Awards
- First-team All-ECFC (2015)

Tyler Higley (born c. 1995) is an American college football coach. He is the head football coach for Vermont State University Castleton, a position he has held since 2024. He also coached for Western New England. He played college football for Castleton as a quarterback and defensive back.

== Head coaching record ==
Year	Team	Overall	Conference	Standing	Bowl/playoffs
Castleton Spartans (Massachusetts State Collegiate Athletic Conference) (2024)
2024	Castleton	3–7	2–7	9th	
Castleton Spartans (New Jersey Athletic Conference) (2025–present)
2025	Castleton	2–8	0–7	8th	
2026	Castleton	0–0	0–0		
Castleton:		5–15	2–14		
Total:		5–15			
