= Schumansville, Texas =

- Unincorporated place
- Location within Texas Location within the United States
- Coordinates: 29°38′43″N 98°04′36″W
- Country: United States
- State: Texas
- County: Guadalupe
- Elevation: 630 ft (190 m)
- Time zone: UTC-6 (Central (CST))
  - Summer (DST): UTC-5 (CDT)
- Area code: 830
- GNIS feature ID: 1384865

Schumansville is a historic German settlement in Guadalupe County, Texas, United States. It is an unincorporated community.

== History ==
German settlers first immigrated to the area in the 1840s. Schumansville was named for the original landowner and settler of the community, August Wilhelm Schumann. Schumansville is located on the banks of the Guadalupe River in western Guadalupe County. The location on which Schumansville sits is on the Ignatius S. Johnson survey. Texas President, Anson Jones, issued a patent for the property in 1846, which consisted of 18 labors of land.

August Wilhelm Schumann (1791-1858) immigrated from Kothen, West Prussia and arrived in Texas with his family in 1846. He purchased 3,188.5 acres of land from Ignatius S. Johnson. He received a wagon train of immigrants from West Prussia a few months later and agreed to sell them strips of land near the Guadalupe River. 350 acres were divided into 15 one mile long parcels of land. The settlers built their houses about 200 feet apart and then built a communal fence around their properties to protect their crops from local livestock.

In those days, the residents found it a difficult trip fording the river to get to the county seat in Seguin, Texas. Because of this difficult travel to Seguin, they petitioned the Texas Legislature in 1849 to change the county lines, placing their German community with other Germans in Comal County. Their request was denied and they remained a part of Guadalupe County and made the trek to file for deed of their lands in September, 1850.

Education was important in Schumansville and a school was built to service the community in 1851. Entrepreneurial individuals from Schumansville ventured to the east side of the Guadalupe river and established the town of Geronimo, Texas in 1860. By 1904, the Schumansville educational facilities had doubled and two one-teacher schools served forty-nine students. A post office was constructed and operated from 1904 to 1906. The population declined in 1933, but after WWII the population had doubled and has steadily continued to climb through the present day.

The Schumannsville Cemetery is located one and a half miles away, in the northern part of Schumann's land. The first loss of the community was the schoolteacher, Carl Blumberg, who died of yellow fever in 1853. The second burial was that of founder August Schumann who died in 1858. The rectangular shaped cemetery contains 2.75 acres of land and is the final resting place of at least 31 of the old German immigrants from Prussia. Their tombstones bear their German inscriptions.

== Geography ==
Schumannsville is located about 34 miles (55 km) northeast of downtown San Antonio and 50 miles (80 km) southwest of Austin. Schumansville is off FM 725, about 10 miles (16 km) northwest of Seguin, in western Guadalupe County.

== Legacy ==
A Texas Sesquicentennial marker was placed near the Schumansville cemetery to honor the history of this area in 1986.

== Notes ==
Hilda Blumberg Weinert, the first woman vice chairman of the Texas State Democratic Committee and national committeewoman from 1944 to 1957 (after Clara Driscoll's sixteen years), was born on April 19, 1889, in the Schumansville community (daughter of Emma Henrietta (Meyer) and Henry J. Blumberg).
