= Clear Springs Air Force Auxiliary Field =

Former US Air Force facility in Texas

Coordinates: 29°42′11″N 98°2′28″W

Clear Springs Air Force Auxiliary Field is a former United States Air Force facility located 4 mi (6.4 km) East of New Braunfels, Texas, near Clear Springs.

== History ==
Originally opened as Clear Springs Auxiliary Field #5 when it was leased in 1940, before being surplus on June 7, 1944. After being reactivated during the Cold War as Clear Springs Air Force Auxiliary Field, the installation transferred to the Army on December 15, 1956; it was then assigned to Randolph Air Force Base from May 1, 1964, until June 9, 1967, when it closed. A plan to move F-15 Eagles to the base in 1982 was considered. The airfield currently serving New Braunfels is the New Braunfels Regional Airport.
