= Northcliff, Texas =

Northcliffe, Texas
- Neighborhood of Schertz, Texas; Former CDP
- Location within Texas Location within the United States
- Coordinates: 29°37′10″N 98°13′15″W
- Country: United States
- State: Texas
- County: Guadalupe

Area
  - Total: 1.7 sq mi (4.3 km^{2})
  - Land: 1.7 sq mi (4.3 km^{2})
  - Water: 0 sq mi (0.0 km^{2})
- Elevation: 906 ft (276 m)

Population (2000)
  - Total: 1,819
  - Density: 1,100/sq mi (423/km^{2})
- Time zone: UTC-6 (Central (CST))
  - Summer (DST): UTC-5 (CDT)
- FIPS code: 48-51990
- GNIS feature ID: 2408956

Northcliffe is a former census-designated place (CDP) in Guadalupe County, Texas, United States. The population was 1,819 at the 2000 census. The area is now part of the city of Schertz and did not have its population recorded separately at the 2010 census. It is part of the San Antonio Metropolitan Statistical Area.

== Geography ==
Northcliffe is located in western Guadalupe County just south of the Comal County line and east of Farm-to-market road 1103.

According to the United States Census Bureau, the CDP had a total area of 1.7 square miles (4.4 km^{2}), all land.

== Demographics ==
As of the census of 2000, there were 1,819 people, 719 households, and 552 families residing in the CDP. The population density was 1,088.6 inhabitants per square mile (420.3/km^{2}). There were 743 housing units at an average density of 444.7 per square mile (171.7/km^{2}). The racial makeup of the CDP was 82.30% White, 6.27% African American, 0.55% Native American, 1.92% Asian, 6.49% from other races, and 2.47% from two or more races. Hispanic or Latino of any race were 16.11% of the population.

There were 719 households, out of which 31.0% had children under the age of 18 living with them, 66.3% were married couples living together, 7.5% had a female householder with no husband present, and 23.2% were non-families. 19.1% of all households were made up of individuals, and 9.9% had someone living alone who was 65 years of age or older. The average household size was 2.53 and the average family size was 2.90.

In the CDP, the population was spread out, with 23.7% under the age of 18, 6.0% from 18 to 24, 24.4% from 25 to 44, 24.8% from 45 to 64, and 21.0% who were 65 years of age or older. The median age was 42 years. For every 100 females, there were 95.2 males. For every 100 females age 18 and over, there were 88.8 males.

The median income for a household in the CDP was $51,364, and the median income for a family was $52,895. Males had a median income of $35,740 versus $27,021 for females. The per capita income for the CDP was $21,944. About 5.9% of families and 7.8% of the population were below the poverty line, including 9.6% of those under age 18 and 5.0% of those age 65 or over.
