= Zorn, Texas =

Unincorporated community in Guadalupe County, Texas, United States

- Unincorporated community
- Location within Texas Location within the United States
- Coordinates: 29°45′11″N 97°56′53″W
- Country: United States
- State: Texas
- County: Guadalupe
- Elevation: 538 ft (164 m)
- Time zone: UTC-6 (Central (CST))
  - Summer (DST): UTC-5 (CDT)
- Area code: 830
- GNIS feature ID: 1372107

Zorn is an unincorporated community in northern Guadalupe County, Texas, United States. Zorn is located on Texas State Highway 123, approximately 13 miles (21 km) north of the town of Seguin.

== History ==
The small town of Zorn was named for the storekeeper Joseph Zorn. Joseph Zorn also served as mayor of Seguin from 1890 to 1910. In the late 1800s, Zorn had a population of 150, along with two grist mills. The population was 60 as of 2000.

== See also ==
- List of unincorporated communities in Texas
