= Rich Alercio =

American football coach (born 1965)

Current position
- Title: Head coach
- Team: St. Johnsbury Academy (VT)
- Record: 76–37

Biographical details
- Born: January 8, 1965 (age 61); Toms River, New Jersey, U.S.
- Education: Ursinus College (1987); West Chester University (1991)

Playing career

Football
- 1984–1987: Ursinus

Lacrosse
- 1984–1987: Ursinus
- Position: Center (football)

Coaching career (HC unless noted)

Football
- 1988: Toms River North HS (NJ) (DE)
- 1989–1990: West Chester (GA)
- 1991: East Stroudsburg (OL)
- 1992: Kean (DC)
- 1993–2007: Trenton State / TCNJ (OC/OL)
- 2008–2010: Castleton
- 2013–present: St. Johnsbury Academy (VT)

Administrative career (AD unless noted)
- 2013–present: St. Johnsbury Academy (VT) (assistant AD)

Head coaching record
- Overall: 8–10 (college); 76–37 (high school)

Rich Alercio (born January 8, 1965) is an American college football coach. He is the head football coach for St. Johnsbury Academy, a position he has held since 2013. He was the head football coach for Castleton State College—now known as Vermont State University Castleton—from 2008 to 2010. He also coached for Toms River High School North, West Chester, East Stroudsburg, Kean, and TCNJ. He played college football for Ursinus as a center.

A resident of Hamilton Township, Mercer County, New Jersey, Alercio was raised in Toms River, New Jersey, and played prep football at Toms River High School North.

== Head coaching record ==
=== College ===
| Year | Team | Overall | Conference | Standing | Bowl/playoffs |
|---|---|---|---|---|---|
Castleton Spartans (Eastern Collegiate Football Conference) (2009–2010)
| 2009 | Castleton | 3–6 | 1–5 | 6th | |
| 2010 | Castleton | 5–4 | 5–2 | T–2nd | |
| Castleton: | | 8–10 | 6–7 | | |
| Total: | | 8–10 | | | |

=== High school ===
| Year | Team | Overall | Conference | Standing | Bowl/playoffs |
|---|---|---|---|---|---|
St. Johnsbury Academy Hilltoppers () (2013–present)
| 2013 | St. Johnsbury Academy | 3–6 | 2–4 | 11th | |
| 2014 | St. Johnsbury Academy | 10–1 | 6–0 | 2nd | |
| 2015 | St. Johnsbury Academy | 5–5 | 3–4 | 7th | |
| 2016 | St. Johnsbury Academy | 8–3 | 5–2 | 4th | |
| 2017 | St. Johnsbury Academy | 11–0 | 7–0 | 1st | |
| 2018 | St. Johnsbury Academy | 7–3 | 5–2 | 2nd | |
| 2019 | St. Johnsbury Academy | 10–2 | 7–0 | 2nd | |
| 2020 | St. Johnsbury Academy | 3–1 | 0–0 | N/A | |
| 2021 | St. Johnsbury Academy | 4–4 | 3–3 | 7th | |
| 2022 | St. Johnsbury Academy | 5–4 | 4–3 | 5th | |
| 2023 | St. Johnsbury Academy | 5–4 | 4–1 | 2nd | |
| 2024 | St. Johnsbury Academy | 5–4 | 2–3 | 5th | |
| St. Johnsbury Academy: | | 76–37 | 48–22 | | |
| Total: | | 76–37 | | | |
National championship Conference title Conference division title or championship game berth
