= La Vernia Independent School District =

School district in Texas, United States

La Vernia Independent School District is a public school district based in La Vernia, Texas (USA).

Located in Wilson County, a portion of the district extends into Guadalupe County.

In 2009, the school district was rated "recognized" by the Texas Education Agency.

== Schools ==
- La Vernia High School (Grades 9-12)
- La Vernia Junior High School (Grades 6-8)
- La Vernia Intermediate School (Grades 3-5)
- La Vernia Primary School (Grades K-2)
- La Vernia Alternative School (All Grades)
