= Reedville, Texas =

- Unincorporated community
- Location within Texas Location within the United States
- Coordinates: 29°52′47″N 97°50′47″W
- Country: United States
- State: Texas
- County: Caldwell
- Elevation: 561 ft (171 m)
- Time zone: UTC-6 (Central (CST))
  - Summer (DST): UTC-5 (CDT)
- Area codes: 512 & 737
- GNIS feature ID: 1345006

Reedville is an unincorporated community in Caldwell County, in the U.S. state of Texas. It is located within the Greater Austin metropolitan area.

== Geography ==
Reedville is located on Farm to Market Road 1984, 10 mi (16 km) west of Lockhart in the extreme western part of Caldwell County.

== Education ==
In 1905, Reedville had two schools that then joined with the San Marcos Consolidated Independent School District (CISD) in neighboring Hays County in 1949. The community is still served by the San Marcos Consolidated Independent School District.
