= James Langabeer =

James R. Langabeer II
- Occupations: Decision scientist, academic, and entrepreneur

Academic background
- Education: Baylor University, Waco, Texas; The University of Houston; The University of Lancaster

James R. Langabeer II is an American decision scientist, academic, and entrepreneur known for his theories on strategy and decision-making. He is the Robert H. Graham Professor of Entrepreneurial Biomedical Informatics and Bioengineering at The University of Texas Health Science Center at Houston (UTHealth Houston), and maintains faculty appointments in the department of Emergency Medicine and Psychiatry.

Langabeer is most known for his research on integrated theories of decision-making, collaboration, management strategy, and financial intelligence, especially in medicine and healthcare. He founded the strategy consultancy Yellowstone Research. Langabeer was a finalist for the most influential leader award in 2022 by Success Magazine. He is the author of over 125 scientific articles and five books, entitled The Quest for Wealth: Six Steps for Making Mindful Money Choices, Health Care Operations Management: A Systems Perspective, Performance Improvement in Hospitals and Health Systems: Managing Analytics and Quality in Healthcare, Creating Demand Driven Supply Chains: How to Profit from Demand Chain Management, and Competitive Business Strategy for Teaching Hospitals.

Langabeer was named a Fellow of the American Heart Association and the American College of Healthcare Executives, and is a past Fellow of the Healthcare Information and Management Systems Society.

== Early life and education ==
Langabeer graduated from New Braunfels High School (Texas). He received a Bachelor of Business Administration degree from the University of Texas at San Antonio, a Master of Business Administration from Baylor University, a Doctor of Education in Leadership from the University of Houston, and a Doctor of Philosophy in Management Science from the University of Lancaster in England. His Ph.D. thesis focused on quantitative decision-making models.

== Career ==
Langabeer started his career at Lyondell Chemical (now LyondellBasell). He later joined the consulting arm of Demantra, where he eventually became the Executive Vice President. During this time there, he simultaneously served on the graduate faculty of Boston University.

Langabeer is also well-known as the founding Chief Executive Officer of one of the largest health information exchanges in the U.S. (Healthconnect). He is the Vice Chairman of Population Health in the Department of Emergency Medicine at University of Texas Health Science Center at Houston.

Langabeer has been on the medical school, public health, and informatics faculty at UTHealth Houston since 2007. He has started and led multiple large research centers and programs, including the Center for Emergency Research, Center for Health Systems Analytics, and the Houston Emergency Opioid Engagement System (HEROES), an innovative large-scale behavioral health program for individuals with substance use disorder. He is the past national Chairman of the American Heart Association’s Ambulatory Quality committee.

== Research ==
Langabeer’s medical research focuses on improving medical outcomes through technology and inter-organizational collaboration. He also works on cognitive decision making, behavioral economics, and healthcare quality.

=== Health management and quality ===
In 2016, Langabeer published the textbook Health Care Operations Management: A Systems Perspective, which is focused on exploring hospital finances, project management, patient flows, performance management, process improvement, and supply chain management. His most highly cited research focuses on technology and processes for quality improvement in healthcare. In 2010, he evaluated the evidences regarding six sigma and lean in the health care industry, and highlighted the significant gaps that existed in the SS/L health care quality improvement literature. Having discussed the gaps, he described the implementation procedures of lean and six sigma quality initiatives in hospitals. He also explored the relationship that exists between goal attainment and quality management, and present descriptive findings about reported usage and adoption of quality initiative. While focusing his research on telehealth-enabled emergency medical services program, he found out the efficacy of mobile technology-driven delivery models in terms of reducing unnecessary ED ambulance transports and increasing EMS unit productivity.

=== Decision making ===
Langabeer has focused a part of his research on improving intelligence and decision making for medicine and healthcare. He has investigated how non-profit organizations create decisions and strategically respond to financial distress when faced with potential for bankruptcy or closure. In 2021, he co-authored insights regarding cardiovascular health (CVH) trajectories in time-series electronic health records with artificial intelligence models, after having an analysis of the predictions of 5 CVH submetrics, including smoking status (SMK), body mass index (BMI), blood pressure (BP), hemoglobin A1c (A1C), and low-density lipoprotein (LDL). His research has also highlighted the impact of politics on federal disaster declaration decision delays. Results of his studies indicated that "the partisan nature of the dyad does influence overall decision delays and more specifically that a Democratic president-Republican governor combination resulted in the shortest mean delays across all declarations." In 2012, he explored how dispositional optimism affects the relationship that exists between rational decision-making processes and organizational performance.

== Bibliography ==
=== Books ===
- Competitive Business Strategy for Teaching Hospitals (2000) ISBN 9781567203493
- Creating Demand Driven Supply Chains: How to Profit from Demand Chain Management (2003) ISBN 9781904298403
- Performance Improvement in Hospitals and Health Systems: Managing Analytics and Quality in Healthcare, 2nd Edition (2018) ISBN 9781351584944
- Health Care Operations Management: A Systems Perspective, 3rd Edition (2022) ISBN 9781284194142
- The Quest for Wealth: Six Steps for Making Mindful Money Choices (2022) ISBN 9781000571523

=== Selected articles ===
- Langabeer, J. R., DelliFraine, J. L., Heineke, J., & Abbass, I. (2009). Implementation of Lean and Six Sigma quality initiatives in hospitals: A goal theoretic perspective. Operations Management Research, 2(1), 13-27.
- Langabeer, J. and DelliFraine, J. (2010). The Influence of CEO Optimism on Strategic Process. Management Research Review, 34 (8), 857-868
- Helton, J., Langabeer, J., DelliFraine, J., and Hsu, E. (2012). Do EHR Investments Lead to Lower Staffing Levels?” Healthcare Financial Management, 66 (2), 54-60.
- DelliFraine, J. L., Langabeer, J. R., & Nembhard, I. M. (2010). Assessing the evidence of Six Sigma and Lean in the health care industry. Quality Management in Healthcare, 19(3), 211-225.
- Langabeer, J. R., Henry, T. D., Kereiakes, D. J., DelliFraine, J., Emert, J., Wang, Z., ... & Jollis, J. G. (2013). Growth in percutaneous coronary intervention capacity relative to population and disease prevalence. Journal of the American Heart Association, 2(6), e000370.
- Langabeer, J. R., Gonzalez, M., Alqusairi, D., Champagne-Langabeer, T., Jackson, A., Mikhail, J., & Persse, D. (2016). Telehealth-enabled emergency medical services program reduces ambulance transport to urban emergency departments. Western Journal of Emergency Medicine, 17(6), 713.
