= 1963 NAIA soccer championship =

1963 NAIA Soccer Championship

Tournament details
- Country: United States
- Venue(s): Frostburg State College; Frostburg, Maryland
- Teams: 4

Final positions
- Champions: Castleton State (1st title); Earlham (1st title)

Tournament statistics
- Matches played: 2
- Goals scored: 9 (4.5 per match)

Awards
- Best player: Leon Orvis, Castleton State

The 1963 NAIA Soccer Championship was the fifth annual tournament held by the NAIA to determine the national champion of men's college soccer among its members in the United States.

Castleton State and Earlham were declared co-champions after the final match was cancelled due to a snowstorm. It was the first NAIA national title for both the Spartans and the Quakers.

The cancelled final was due to be played at Frostburg State College in Frostburg, Maryland.

== Bracket ==
First Round
Earlham	4
Trenton State	2
Castleton State	2
East Stroudsburg State	1

Championship; Frostburg, MD
Earlham
Castleton State
Third Place
Trenton State
East Stroudsburg State

== See also ==
- 1963 NCAA soccer tournament
