= Chick Autry (catcher) =

American baseball player (1903–1950)

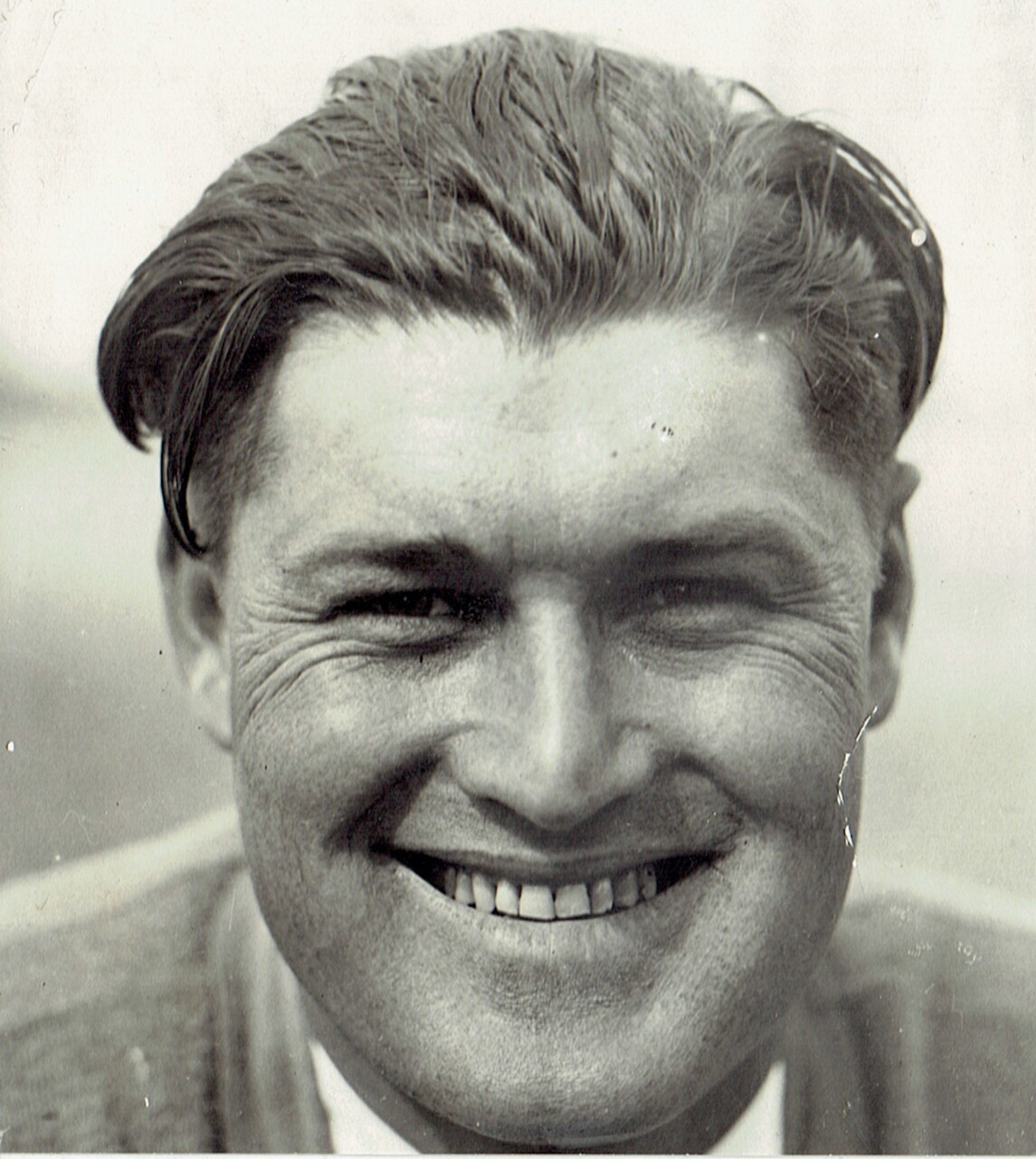
- Autry in 1924
- Catcher
- Born: March 5, 1903; Martindale, Texas, U.S.
- Died: January 26, 1950 (aged 46); Savannah, Georgia, U.S.
- Batted: Right Threw: Right

MLB debut
- April 20, 1924, for the New York Yankees

Last MLB appearance
- September 18, 1930, for the Chicago White Sox

MLB statistics
- Batting average: .245
- Home runs: 2
- Runs batted in: 33
- Stats at Baseball Reference

Teams
- New York Yankees (1924); Cleveland Indians (1926–1928); Chicago White Sox (1929–1930)

Martin Gordon Autry (March 5, 1903 – January 26, 1950) was an American backup catcher in Major League Baseball who played between 1924 and 1930 for the New York Yankees (1924), Cleveland Indians (1926–28) and Chicago White Sox (1929–30). Listed at 6 ft 0 in (1.83 m), 180 lb., Autry batted and threw right-handed. He was born in Martindale, Texas.

In a six-season career, Autry was a .245 hitter (68-for-277) with two home runs and 33 RBI in 120 games, including 21 runs, 17 doubles and three triples. In 96 catching appearances, he posted a .965 fielding percentage with just 12 errors in 268 chances.

Autry managed in minor league baseball from 1937 to 1942 and 1947 to 1949, including six years at the helm of the Savannah Indians. He was the incumbent skipper of the Yankees' Double-A farm team, the Beaumont Exporters, when he died from a heart attack in Savannah, Georgia, at age 46 during the 1949–50 offseason.

== Sources ==
- Career statistics from Baseball Reference · Baseball Reference (Minors) · Retrosheet · Baseball Almanac, or Retrosheet
