= Guadalupe County, Texas =

County in Texas, United States

- County
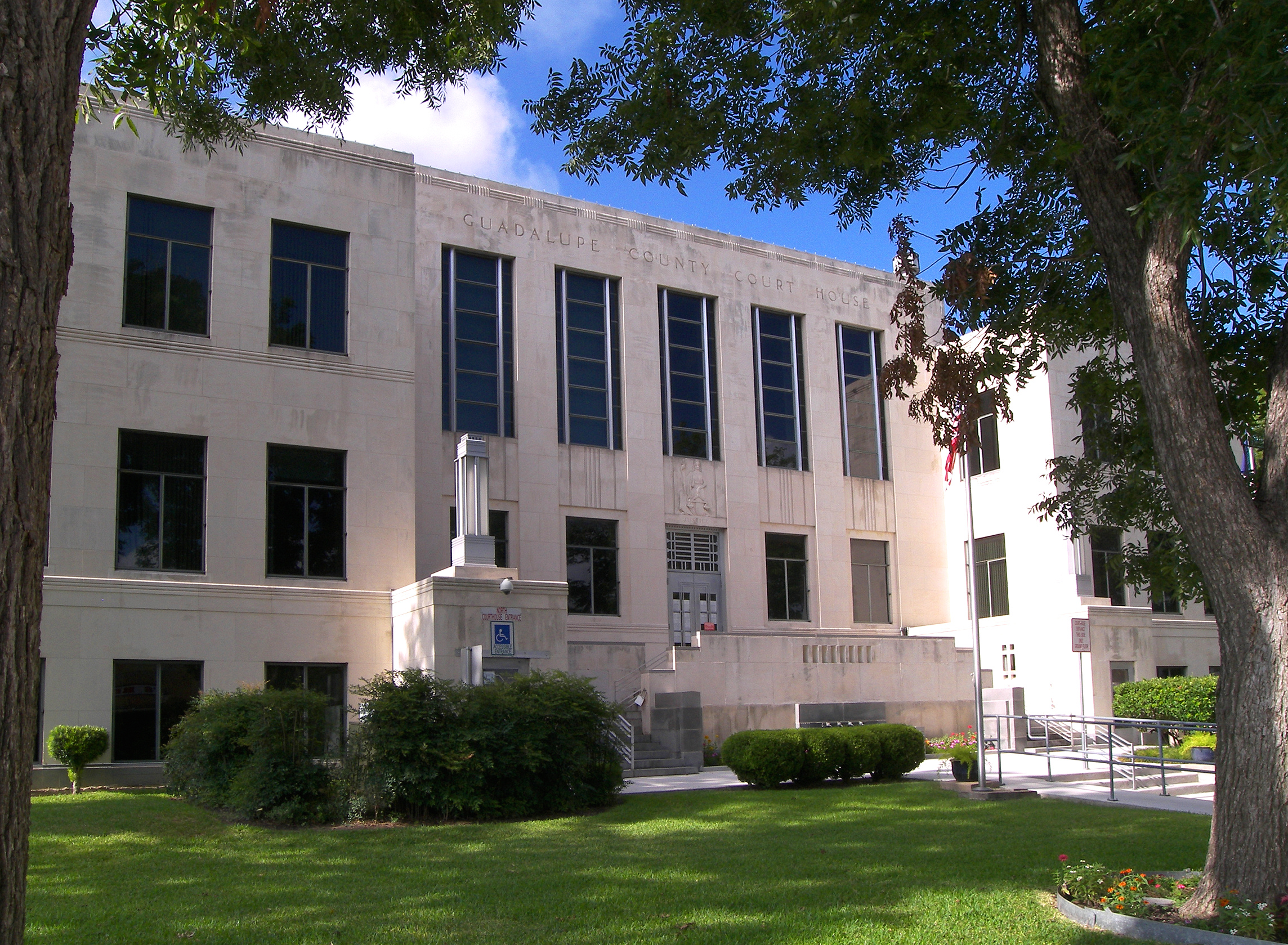
- The Guadalupe County Courthouse in Seguin

- Location within the U.S. state of Texas
- Coordinates: 29°35′N 97°57′W
- Country: United States
- State: Texas
- Founded: 1846
- Named for: Guadalupe River
- Seat: Seguin
- Largest city: Schertz

Area
  - Total: 715 sq mi (1,850 km^{2})
  - Land: 711 sq mi (1,840 km^{2})
  - Water: 3.5 sq mi (9.1 km^{2}) 0.5%

Population (2020)
  - Total: 172,706
  - Estimate (2025): 201,111 ▲
  - Density: 243/sq mi (93.8/km^{2})
- Time zone: UTC−6 (Central)
  - Summer (DST): UTC−5 (CDT)
- Congressional districts: 15th, 28th
- Website: www.guadalupetx.gov

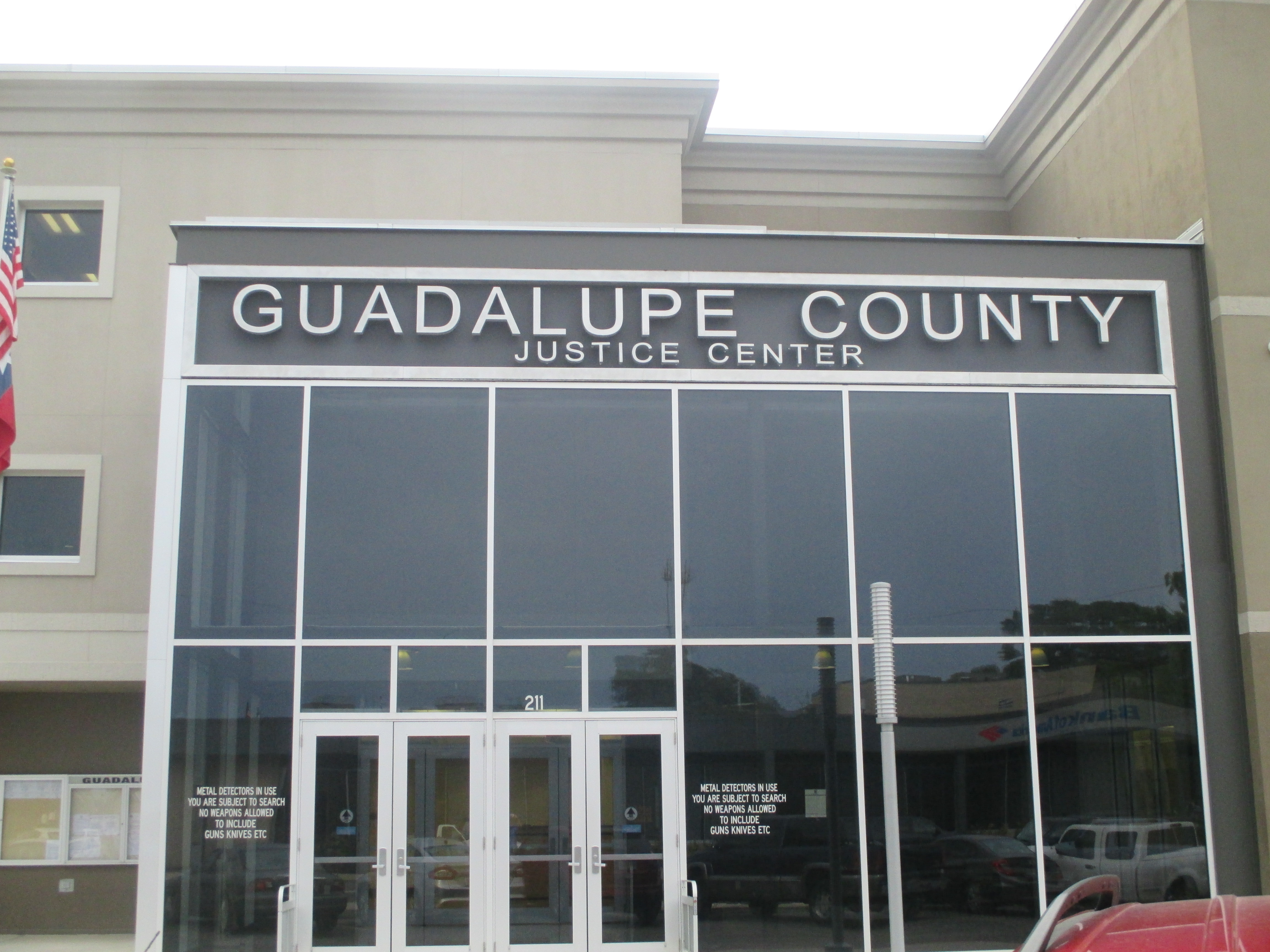
Separate from the courthouse is the Guadalupe County Justice Center on West Court Street

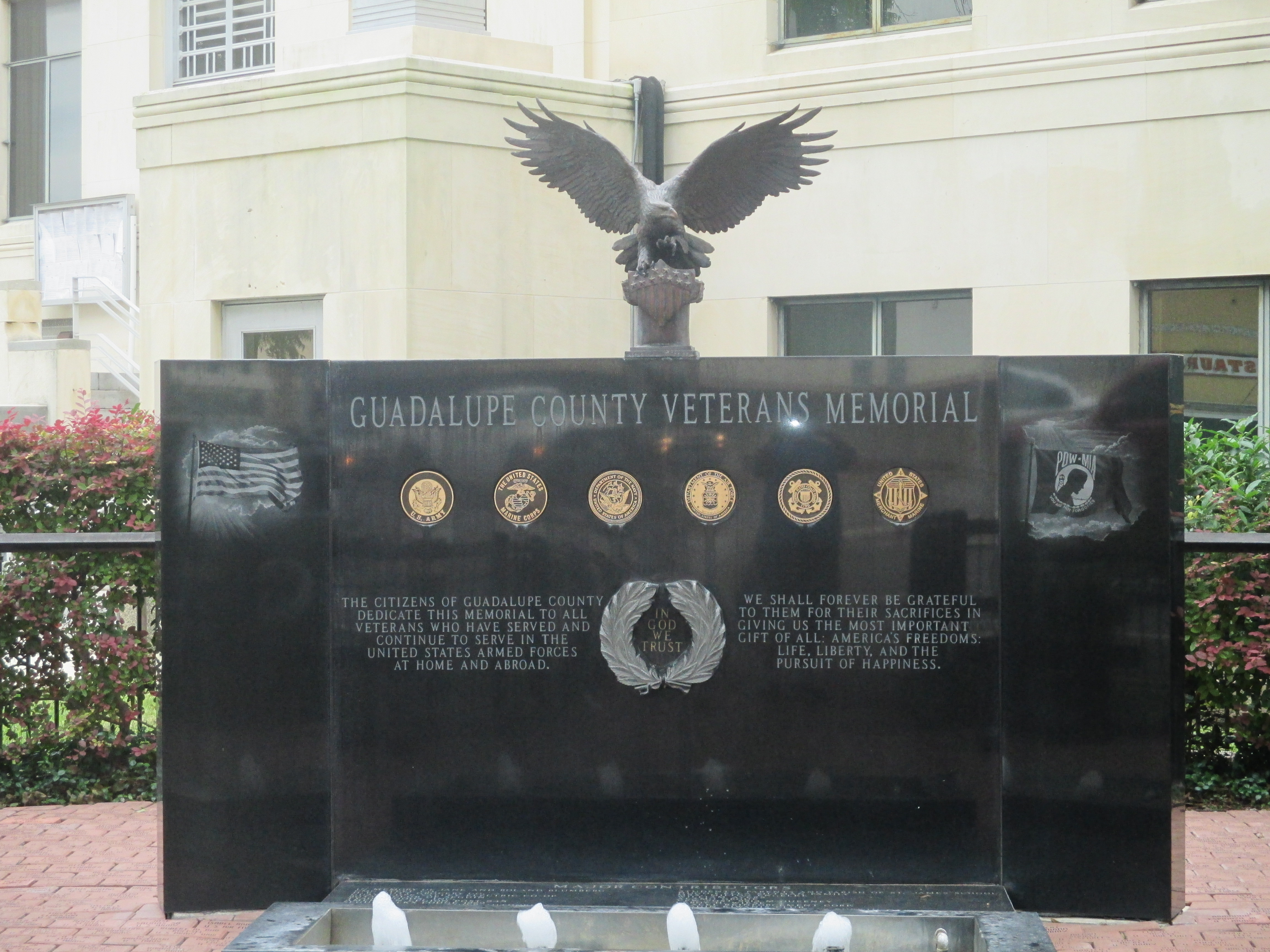
Guadalupe County Veterans Memorial

Guadalupe County (Local /ˌɡwɑːdəˈlʊpiː/, Spanish pronunciation: [gwaðaˈlupe]) is a county located in the U.S. state of Texas. As of the 2020 census, its population was 172,706. The county seat is Seguin. The county was founded in 1846 and is named after the Guadalupe River.

Guadalupe County is part of the San Antonio metropolitan statistical area.

== History ==
Indigenous paleo-Indian hunter-gatherers were the first inhabitants of the area, thousands of years before European colonization. Later, historic Indian tribes settled in the area, including Tonkawa, Karankawa, Kickapoo, Lipan Apache, and Comanche.

In 1689, Alonso de Leon named the Guadalupe River in honor of Our Lady of Guadalupe.

In 1806, French army officer José de la Baume, who later joined the Spanish army, was rewarded for his services to Spain with title to 27,000 acres (11,000 ha) of Texas land, the original El Capote Ranch. The grant was reaffirmed by the Republic of Mexico after it achieved independence.

Following Mexico's independence from Spain, Anglo-Americans from the United States settled in Texas in 1821, and claimed Mexican citizenship. In 1825, Guadalupe County was part of Green DeWitt's petition for a land grant to establish a colony in Texas, which was approved by the Mexican government. From 1827 to 1835, 22 families settled the area as part of DeWitt's colony.

Following Texas' gaining independence from Mexico (1836), 33 Gonzales Rangers and Republic veterans established Seguin. Founded as Walnut Springs in 1838, the settlement's name was changed to Seguin the next year to honor Juan Nepomuceno Seguín, who had fought for independence.

In 1840, the Virginian Michael Erskine acquired the El Capote Ranch for use as a cattle ranch. In 1842, the Republic of Texas organized Guadalupe County as a judicial county. The Texas Supreme Court declared judicial counties to be unconstitutional. In 1845, Prince Carl of Solms-Braunfels secured title to 1,265 acres (512 ha) of the Veramendi grant in the northern part of the former judicial county.

Following the annexation of Texas by the United States (1845), Prussian immigrant August Wilhelm Schumann arrived on the Texas coast aboard the SS Franziska in 1846, and purchased 188 acres (76 ha) in Guadalupe County. Shortly thereafter, the state legislature established the present county from parts of Bexar and Gonzales Counties.

In 1846, during the war between the United States and Mexico, a wagon train of German immigrant settlers bought Guadalupe land from August Schumann. The following year, the town of Schumannsville was established by German immigrants and named after him. Numerous German immigrants entered Texas at Galveston following the revolutions of 1848 in German states, settling in Guadalupe County and central Texas. After their own struggles, they tended to oppose slavery.

The last Indian raid into the area was made by the Kickapoo in 1855.

By 1860, 1,748 slaves of African descent were in the county, generally brought in from the South by slaveholder migrants. In 1861, the people of the county voted 314–22 in favor of secession from the Union. Guadalupe County sent several troops to fight for the Confederate States Army. Following the end of the Civil War and the emancipation of the slaves (1865), a Freedmen's Bureau office opened in 1866 in Seguin to supervise work contracts between former slaves and area farmers. Together, German Americans and African Americans joined the Republican Party, leading Guadalupe County to be a reliably Republican one into the 20th century, even after the state disfranchisement of African Americans in 1901 by imposition of a poll tax.

By 1876, the Galveston, Harrisburg and San Antonio Railway reached Seguin. It was completed as far as San Antonio the following year. By 1880, ethnic Germans accounted for 40% of the county population. Tenant farming and sharecropping accounted for the operation of 25% of the county's farms. By 1910, immigrants from Mexico accounted for about 11% of the country's population.

In 1929, oil was discovered at the Darst Creek oilfield. By 1930, tenant farming and sharecropping comprised 64% of the county's farms.

Over the next five decades, the economy changed markedly, as the area became more urbanized and less dependent on agriculture. By 1982, professional and related services, manufacturing, and wholesale and retail trade involved nearly 60% of the workforce in the area.

== Geography ==
According to the U.S. Census Bureau, the county has a total area of 715 square miles (1,850 km^{2}), of which 711 square miles (1,840 km^{2}) are land and 3.5 square miles (9.1 km^{2}) (0.5%) are covered by water.

=== Major highways ===
- Interstate 10
- Interstate 35
- U.S. Highway 90
- U.S. Highway 90 Alternate
- State Highway 46
- State Highway 80
- State Highway 123
- State Highway 130

=== Adjacent counties ===
- Hays County (north)
- Caldwell County (northeast)
- Gonzales County (southeast)
- Wilson County (south)
- Bexar County (southwest)
- Comal County (northwest)

== Demographics ==
Historical population
Census	Pop.	Note	%±
1850	1,511		—
1860	5,444		260.3%
1870	7,282		33.8%
1880	12,202		67.6%
1890	15,217		24.7%
1900	21,385		40.5%
1910	24,913		16.5%
1920	27,719		11.3%
1930	28,925		4.4%
1940	25,596		−11.5%
1950	25,392		−0.8%
1960	29,017		14.3%
1970	33,554		15.6%
1980	46,708		39.2%
1990	64,873		38.9%
2000	89,023		37.2%
2010	131,533		47.8%
2020	172,706		31.3%
2025 (est.)	201,111	▲	16.4%
U.S. Decennial Census; 1850–2010 2010 2020

=== Racial and ethnic composition ===
Guadalupe County, Texas – Racial and ethnic composition Note: the US Census treats Hispanic/Latino as an ethnic category. This table excludes Latinos from the racial categories and assigns them to a separate category. Hispanics/Latinos may be of any race.
Race / Ethnicity (NH = Non-Hispanic)	Pop 1980	Pop 1990	Pop 2000	Pop 2010	Pop 2020	% 1980	% 1990	% 2000	% 2010	% 2020
White alone (NH)	31,284	41,454	52,858	72,086	84,063	66.98%	63.90%	59.38%	54.80%	48.67%
Black or African American alone (NH)	3,094	3,451	4,310	7,963	11,947	6.62%	5.32%	4.84%	6.05%	6.92%
Native American or Alaska Native alone (NH)	110	171	290	436	476	0.24%	0.26%	0.33%	0.33%	0.28%
Asian alone (NH)	208	403	733	1,748	3,066	0.45%	0.62%	0.82%	1.33%	1.78%
Native Hawaiian or Pacific Islander alone (NH)	x	x	77	146	353	x	x	0.09%	0.11%	0.20%
Other race alone (NH)	140	148	119	177	774	0.30%	0.23%	0.13%	0.13%	0.45%
Mixed race or Multiracial (NH)	x	x	1,075	2,088	6,794	x	x	1.21%	1.59%	3.93%
Hispanic or Latino (any race)	11,872	19,246	29,561	46,889	65,233	25.42%	29.67%	33.21%	35.65%	37.77%
Total	46,708	64,873	89,023	131,533	172,706	100.00%	100.00%	100.00%	100.00%	100.00%

=== 2020 census ===
As of the 2020 census, the county had a population of 172,706. The median age was 37.7 years. 25.8% of residents were under the age of 18 and 14.7% of residents were 65 years of age or older. For every 100 females there were 96.4 males, and for every 100 females age 18 and over there were 93.5 males age 18 and over.

The racial makeup of the county was 59.7% White, 7.4% Black or African American, 0.8% American Indian and Alaska Native, 1.9% Asian, 0.2% Native Hawaiian and Pacific Islander, 10.5% from some other race, and 19.4% from two or more races. Hispanic or Latino residents of any race comprised 37.8% of the population.

75.2% of residents lived in urban areas, while 24.8% lived in rural areas.

There were 59,975 households in the county, of which 38.4% had children under the age of 18 living in them. Of all households, 57.4% were married-couple households, 14.7% were households with a male householder and no spouse or partner present, and 22.0% were households with a female householder and no spouse or partner present. About 19.8% of all households were made up of individuals and 8.5% had someone living alone who was 65 years of age or older.

There were 64,482 housing units, of which 7.0% were vacant. Among occupied housing units, 76.8% were owner-occupied and 23.2% were renter-occupied. The homeowner vacancy rate was 1.5% and the rental vacancy rate was 6.5%.

=== 2000 census ===
As of the 2000 census, 89,023 people, 30,900 households, and 23,823 families were residing in the county. The population density was 125 people/mi^{2} (48 people/km^{2}). The 33,585 housing units average 47 per square mile (18/km^{2}). The racial makeup of the county was 77.65% White, 5.01% African American, 0.55% Native American, 0.87% Asian, 12.86% from other races, and 3.07% from two or more races. About 33.21% of the population were Hispanics or Latinos of any race.

Of the 30,900 households, 38.30% had children under 18 living with them, 61.60% were married couples living together, 11.20% had a female householder with no husband present, and 22.90% were not families. About 18.90% of all households were made up of individuals, and 7.60% had someone living alone who was 65 or older. The average household size was 2.83, and the average family size was 3.23.

In the county, the age distribution was 28.50% under 18, 9.00% from 18 to 24, 29.10% from 25 to 44, 22.20% from 45 to 64, and 11.30% who were 65 or older. The median age was 35 years. For every 100 females, there were 97.00 males. For every 100 females age 18 and over, there were 94.30 males.

The median income for a household was $43,949, and for a family was $49,645. Males had a median income of $32,450 versus $23,811 for females. The per capita income for the county was $18,430. About 7.30% of families and 9.80% of the population were below the poverty line, including 13.30% of those under age 18 and 9.50% of those 65 or over.

== Education ==
=== School districts ===
School districts include:

- Comal Independent School District
- La Vernia Independent School District
- Luling Independent School District
- Marion Independent School District
- Navarro Independent School District
- New Braunfels Independent School District
- Nixon-Smiley Consolidated Independent School District
- Prairie Lea Independent School District
- San Marcos Consolidated Independent School District
- Schertz-Cibolo-Universal City Independent School District
- Seguin Independent School District

=== Colleges and universities ===
Most of the county is in the service area of Alamo Community College District. The portion in San Marcos CISD is zoned to Austin Community College.

Texas Lutheran University has about 1,400 students. It is affiliated with the Evangelical Lutheran Church in America. It was ranked number three among the best west regional universities by U.S. News & World Report in 2013. Texas Lutheran is now a member of the Southern Collegiate Athletic Conference, NCAA Division III, with Austin College, Colorado College, Centenary College of Louisiana, Schreiner University, Southwestern University, Trinity University, and the University of Dallas.

== Communities ==
=== Cities (multiple counties) ===
- Cibolo (a small portion in Bexar County)
- Luling (mostly in Caldwell County)
- New Braunfels (mostly in Comal County as well as its seat)
- San Marcos (mostly in Hays County and a small part in Caldwell County)
- Schertz (partly in Bexar and Comal Counties)
- Selma (partly in Bexar and Comal Counties)
- Universal City (mostly in Bexar County)

=== Cities ===
- Kingsbury
- Marion
- New Berlin
- Santa Clara
- Seguin (county seat)
- Staples

=== Census-designated places ===
- Geronimo
- Lake Dunlap
- McQueeney
- Redwood
- Zuehl

=== Unincorporated communities ===
- Barbarosa
- Clear Springs
- Leesville‡
- Northcliff
- Schumansville
- Zorn

=== Ghost town ===
- Concrete

== Public Safety ==
=== Public Safety Departments ===
Guadalupe County is covered by eight career and eight volunteer fire departments. There are multiple law enforcement agencies within the county, each city with the exception of Kingsbury provides their own police force along with the Guadalupe County Sheriffs Office and Constables.

==== Career Fire Departments ====
The eight career fire departments respond with their city limits as well as to fires in small portions in the county. Guadalupe County established its first career department in 2020, and became full time in December 2022. Guadalupe County Fire Rescue was established to augment and assist the volunteer departments with responses due to the increasing volume of emergencies.

- Seguin Fire/EMS
- Schertz Fire Department
- Cibolo Fire Department
- Luling Fire Department
- San Marcos Fire Department
- New Braunfels Fire Department
- Selma Fire Department
- Guadalupe County Fire Rescue

==== Volunteer Fire Departments ====
The eight volunteer departments are based in small towns, or unincorporated areas. These volunteer departments are required to have a first responder organization license through the State of Texas, as well as a certain amount of training hours per year.

- Geronimo VFD- Covers the Geronimo Community and surrounding areas.
- Marion VFD- Covers the Marion, Santa Clara, and surrounding areas.
- Kingsbury VFD- Covers Kingsbury, and surround area.
- McQueeney VFD- Covers the McQueeney Community and surrounding area.
- Lake Dunlap VFD- Covers a small unincorporated area around Lake Dunlap.
- York Creek VFD- Covers, the communities of Zorn, Staples, Redwood, and surrounding areas.
- New Berlin VFD- Covers New Berlin, the Zuehl Community, and surrounding areas.
- Sand Hills VFD- Covers the unincorporated area of southeastern Guadalupe County.

=== EMS Agencies ===
Emergency Medical Services is provided by Schertz EMS that contracts to other agencies within the county to provide such services.

- Seguin Fire/EMS
- Schertz EMS
- San Marcos/Hays County EMS
- Luling EMS
- Acadian Ambulance
- Wilson County ESD 3 EMS

=== Law Enforcement Departments ===
- Guadalupe County Sheriffs Department
- Guadalupe County Constables Precinct 1–4
- Seguin PD
- Schertz PD
- Cibolo PD
- Selma PD
- Marion PD
- New Berlin Marshals Office
- Staples Police Department
- Santa Clara Marshals Office

== Politics ==
Guadalupe is a strongly Republican county that possessed strong GOP leanings even during the Solid South era. The only Democratic presidential candidate to carry Guadalupe County since 1940 has been Hill Country native Lyndon B. Johnson during his 1964 landslide.

Although Al Smith did win the county in 1928 due to anti-Prohibition sentiment, Guadalupe had even leaned Republican before Warren G. Harding's 1920 landslide, voting Republican in every election between 1896 and 1924 except the divided 1912 contest.

United States presidential election results for Guadalupe County, Texas
Year	Republican		Democratic		Third party(ies)	
Year	No.	%	No.	%	No.	%
1912	1,065	38.71%	1,128	41.00%	558	20.28%
1916	1,812	68.38%	830	31.32%	8	0.30%
1920	1,839	56.90%	560	17.33%	833	25.77%
1924	1,657	40.52%	831	20.32%	1,601	39.15%
1928	1,442	43.46%	1,872	56.42%	4	0.12%
1932	691	15.52%	3,751	84.27%	9	0.20%
1936	1,266	29.88%	2,962	69.91%	9	0.21%
1940	2,473	53.06%	2,182	46.81%	6	0.13%
1944	2,556	58.85%	1,583	36.45%	204	4.70%
1948	2,502	50.98%	2,119	43.17%	287	5.85%
1952	4,396	65.22%	2,330	34.57%	14	0.21%
1956	4,296	66.86%	2,099	32.67%	30	0.47%
1960	3,657	53.88%	3,116	45.91%	14	0.21%
1964	2,731	37.37%	4,568	62.51%	9	0.12%
1968	4,332	47.59%	3,529	38.77%	1,241	13.63%
1972	8,287	70.84%	3,404	29.10%	7	0.06%
1976	6,766	52.31%	6,054	46.80%	115	0.89%
1980	9,901	64.18%	5,049	32.73%	478	3.10%
1984	14,382	73.80%	5,060	25.96%	46	0.24%
1988	13,265	64.37%	7,111	34.50%	233	1.13%
1992	10,818	46.79%	6,567	28.40%	5,735	24.81%
1996	14,254	58.41%	8,079	33.11%	2,070	8.48%
2000	21,499	70.33%	8,311	27.19%	757	2.48%
2004	28,208	72.79%	10,290	26.55%	254	0.66%
2008	30,869	64.91%	16,156	33.97%	535	1.12%
2012	33,117	66.73%	15,744	31.73%	765	1.54%
2016	36,632	63.02%	18,391	31.64%	3,100	5.33%
2020	47,553	61.16%	28,805	37.04%	1,400	1.80%
2024	54,691	64.24%	29,573	34.74%	872	1.02%

United States Senate election results for Guadalupe County, Texas1
Year	Republican		Democratic		Third party(ies)	
Year	No.	%	No.	%	No.	%
2024	50,972	60.60%	30,981	36.83%	2,159	2.57%

United States Senate election results for Guadalupe County, Texas2
Year	Republican		Democratic		Third party(ies)	
Year	No.	%	No.	%	No.	%
2020	48,308	62.75%	26,697	34.68%	1,976	2.57%
2026	36,786	51.82%	32,666	46.02%	1,530	2.16%

Texas Gubernatorial election results for Guadalupe County
Year	Republican		Democratic		Third party(ies)	
Year	No.	%	No.	%	No.	%
2022	36,882	64.48%	19,356	33.84%	964	1.69%
2026	38,597	54.11%	31,478	44.13%	1,251	1.75%

== Government ==
Guadalupe County is run by a commissioners court presided by the county judge. The court has four members elected for two-year terms. The commissioners are elected by and represent individual districts. The county judge is elected through a county-wide at-large election.

=== County judge past and present ===
- Donald Schraub (2003 - 2007)
- Michael T. Wiggins (2007 - 2012)
- Larry Jones (2012 - 2014)
- Kyle Kutscher (2014–present)

== See also ==
- List of museums in Central Texas
- National Register of Historic Places listings in Guadalupe County, Texas
- Recorded Texas Historic Landmarks in Guadalupe County
