= New Braunfels National Airport =

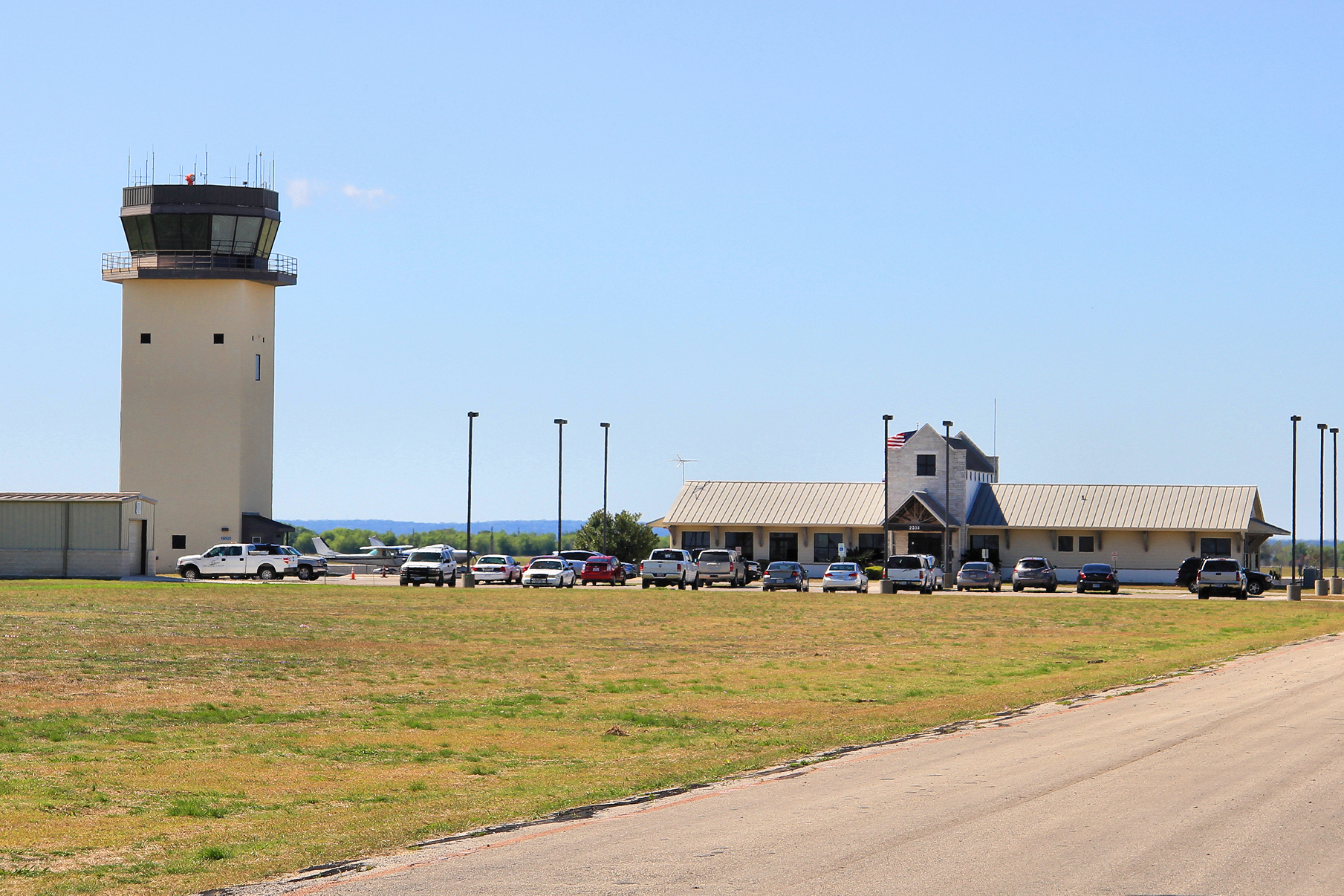
- IATA: none; ICAO: KBAZ; FAA LID: BAZ

Summary
- Airport type: Public
- Owner: City of New Braunfels
- Serves: New Braunfels, Texas
- Elevation AMSL: 651 ft (198 m)
- Coordinates: 29°42′11″N 098°02′28″W
- Website: www.FlyKBAZ.com

Map
- Location of airport in Texas

Runways
Direction	Length		Surface
Direction	ft	m	Surface
13/31	6,503	1,982	Asphalt
17/35	5,364	1,635	Asphalt
4/22 (CLOSED)	5,364	1,635	Asphalt

Statistics (2011)
- Aircraft operations: 44,891
- Based aircraft: 111
- Source: Federal Aviation Administration

New Braunfels National Airport (ICAO: KBAZ, FAA LID: BAZ) is a public use airport in Guadalupe County, Texas, United States. It is owned by the city of New Braunfels and located four nautical miles (5 mi, 7 km) east of its central business district. Formerly known as New Braunfels Regional Airport, it is included in the National Plan of Integrated Airport Systems for 2011–2015, which categorized it as a general aviation facility.

Although most U.S. airports use the same three-letter location identifier for the FAA and IATA, this airport is assigned BAZ by the FAA but has no designation from the IATA (which assigned BAZ to Barcelos Airport in Barcelos, Amazonas, Brazil).

From 1940 to 1967, it operated as Clear Springs Air Force Base.

== Facilities and aircraft ==
New Braunfels National Airport covers an area of 900 acres (364 ha) at an elevation of 651 feet (198 m) above mean sea level. It has two runways with asphalt surfaces: 13/31 is 6,503 by 100 feet (1,982 x 30 m) and 17/35 is 5,364 by 100 feet (1,635 x 30 m).

For the 12-month period ending January 5, 2017, the airport had 52,541 aircraft operations, an average of 144 per day: 81% general aviation, 2% air taxi, and 17% military. At that time there were 145 aircraft based at this airport: 75% single-engine, 9% multi-engine, 12% jet, and 4% helicopter.

== See also ==
- List of airports in Texas
