= Barbarosa, Texas =

Unincorporated community in Texas, US

Coordinates: 29°42′05″N 98°00′11″W

Barbarosa is an unincorporated community in Guadalupe County, in the U.S. state of Texas.

== History ==
A post office was established at Barbarosa in 1900, and only remained open a few months until it was discontinued. The community was probably named after Frederick Barbarossa, formally Frederick I, Holy Roman Emperor, having been originally settled chiefly by Germans.
