= Tony Volpone =

American football coach (born c. 1977)

Biographical details
- Born: c. 1977 (age 48–49); Exeter, New Hampshire, U.S.
- Education: Nichols College (2000, 2002)

Playing career
- 1995–1999: Nichols
- Position: Quarterback

Coaching career (HC unless noted)
- 2000–2002: Nichols (QB/RB)
- 2003: Pine Crest HS (FL) (OC/QB)
- 2004: Bridgewater (TE/OL)
- 2005: Norwich (QB)
- 2006: Becker (OC/QB)
- 2007–2013: Endicott (AHC/OC/QB)
- 2014–2023: Castleton

Head coaching record
- Overall: 41–47

Anthony M. Volpone (born c. 1977) is an American college football coach. He was the head football coach for Castleton University from 2014 to 2023. He also coached for Nichols, Pine Crest School, Bridgewater, Norwich, Becker, and Endicott. He played college football for Nichols as a quarterback.

== Head coaching record ==
Year	Team	Overall	Conference	Standing	Bowl/playoffs
Castleton Spartans (Eastern Collegiate Football Conference) (2014–2023)
2014	Castleton	7–3	7–3	T–2nd	
2015	Castleton	7–3	5–2	T–3rd	
2016	Castleton	4–6	4–3	T–3rd	
2017	Castleton	6–4	5–2	3rd	
2018	Castleton	2–8	1–5	T–5th	
2019	Castleton	2–7	2–3	T–3rd	
2020–21	No team—COVID-19				
2021	Castleton	6–4	4–2	3rd	
2022	Castleton	5–5	4–2	2nd	
2023	Castleton	2–7	0–4	5th	
Castleton:		41–47	32–26		
Total:		41–47			
