= Castleton Spartans football =

College football team in Vermont, US

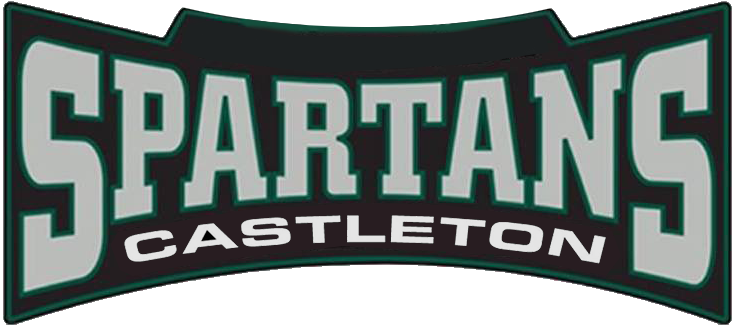
- First season: 2009; 17 years ago
- Athletic director: Tim Barrett
- Head coach: Tyler Higley; 2nd season, 3–7 (.300)
- Location: Castleton, Vermont
- Stadium: Dave Wolk Stadium (formally Spartan Stadium until 2017) (capacity: 5,000)
- NCAA division: Division III
- Conference: NJAC
- Colors: Green and white
- All-time record: 61–76 (.445)
- Bowl record: 0–1 (.000)

Conference championships
- 1 (2012)
- Rivalries: Norwich (Maple Sap Bucket)
- Mascot: Knight
- Website: castletonsports.com

The Castleton Spartans football team represents Vermont State University Castleton in college football at the NCAA Division III level. The Spartans are members of the New Jersey Athletic Conference (NJAC), fielding its team in the NJAC since 2025. The Spartans play their home games at Dave Wolk Stadium in Castleton, Vermont.

Their head coach is Tyler Higley, who took over the position for the 2024 season as interim head coach.

The Spartans are currently the only public university in Vermont with varsity football, as the University of Vermont discontinued their varsity football team in 1974.

Because it is Division III, Vermont is still the only state besides Alaska where the state university does not award any athletic scholarships for football.

== Conference affiliations ==
- Eastern Collegiate Football Conference (2009–2023)
- Massachusetts State Collegiate Athletic Conference (2024)
- New Jersey Athletic Conference (2025–present)

== Championships ==
=== Conference championships ===
Castleton claims 1 conference title, which came in 2012.

Year	Conference	Overall Record	Conference Record	Coach
2012†	Eastern Collegiate Football Conference	7–4	6–1	Marc Klatt

† Co-champions

== Postseason games ==
=== Bowl games ===
Castleton has participated in one bowl game, and has a record of 0–1.

Season	Coach	Bowl	Opponent	Result
2012	Marc Klatt	ECAC Bowl	St. John Fisher	L 7–63

== List of head coaches ==
=== Key ===
Key to symbols in coaches list
General		Overall		Conference		Postseason (Note: Although the first Rose Bowl Game was played in 1902, it has been continuously played since the 1916 game, and is recognized as the oldest bowl game by the NCAA. "—" indicates any season prior to 1916 when postseason games were not played.)	
No.	Order of coaches (Note: A running total of the number of head coaches, with coaches who served separate tenures being counted only once. Interim head coaches are represented with "Int" and are not counted in the running total. "—" indicates the team played but either without a coach or no coach is on record. "X" indicates an interim year without play.)	GC	Games coached	CW	Conference wins	PW	Postseason wins
DC	Division championships	OW	Overall wins	CL	Conference losses	PL	Postseason losses
CC	Conference championships	OL	Overall losses	CT	Conference ties	PT	Postseason ties
NC	National championships	OT	Overall ties (Note: Overtime rules in college football were introduced in 1996, making ties impossible in the period since.)	C%	Conference winning percentage		
†	Elected to the College Football Hall of Fame	O%	Overall winning percentage (Note: When computing the win–loss percentage, a tie counts as half a win and half a loss.)				

=== Coaches ===
List of head football coaches showing season(s) coached, overall records and conference records,
No.	Name	Season(s)	GC	OW	OL	O%	CW	CL	C%
1	Rich Alercio	2009–2010	18	8	10	0.444	6	7	0.462
2	Marc Klatt	2011–2013	31	12	19	0.387	9	12	0.429
3	Tony Volpone	2014–2023	88	41	47	0.466	32	26	0.552
4	Tyler Higley (interim)	2024–present	0	0	0	–	0	0	–

== Year-by-year results ==
National champions	Conference champions	Bowl game berth	Playoff berth

Season	Year	Head coach	Association	Division	Conference	Record					Postseason	Final ranking
Season	Year	Head coach	Association	Division	Conference	Overall		Conference			Postseason	Final ranking
Season	Year	Head coach	Association	Division	Conference	Win	Loss	Finish	Win	Loss	Postseason	Final ranking
Castleton Spartans
2009	2009	Rich Alercio	NCAA	Division III	ECFC	3	6	6th	1	5	—	—
2010	2010	Rich Alercio	NCAA	Division III	ECFC	5	4	T–2nd	5	2	—	—
2011	2011	Marc Klatt	NCAA	Division III	ECFC	4	6	5th	3	4	—	—
2012	2012	Marc Klatt	NCAA	Division III	ECFC	7	4	T–1st	6	1	Conference co-champions	—
2013	2013	Marc Klatt	NCAA	Division III	ECFC	1	9	8th	0	7	—	—
2014	2014	Tony Volpone	NCAA	Division III	ECFC	7	3	T–2nd	7	3	—	—
2015	2015	Tony Volpone	NCAA	Division III	ECFC	7	3	T–3rd	5	2	—	—
2016	2016	Tony Volpone	NCAA	Division III	ECFC	4	6	T–3rd	4	3	—	—
2017	2017	Tony Volpone	NCAA	Division III	ECFC	6	4	3rd	5	2	—	—
2018	2018	Tony Volpone	NCAA	Division III	ECFC	2	8	T–5th	1	5	—	—
2019	2019	Tony Volpone	NCAA	Division III	ECFC	2	7	T–3rd	2	3	—	—
Season canceled due to COVID-19
2021	2021	Tony Volpone	NCAA	Division III	ECFC	6	4	3rd	4	2	—	—
2022	2022	Tony Volpone	NCAA	Division III	ECFC	5	5	2nd	4	2	—	—
2023	2023	Tony Volpone	NCAA	Division III	ECFC	2	7	5th	0	4	—	—
2024	2024	Tyler Higley	NCAA	Division III	MASCAC						—	—
