= New Braunfels High School =

Public school in Texas, United States

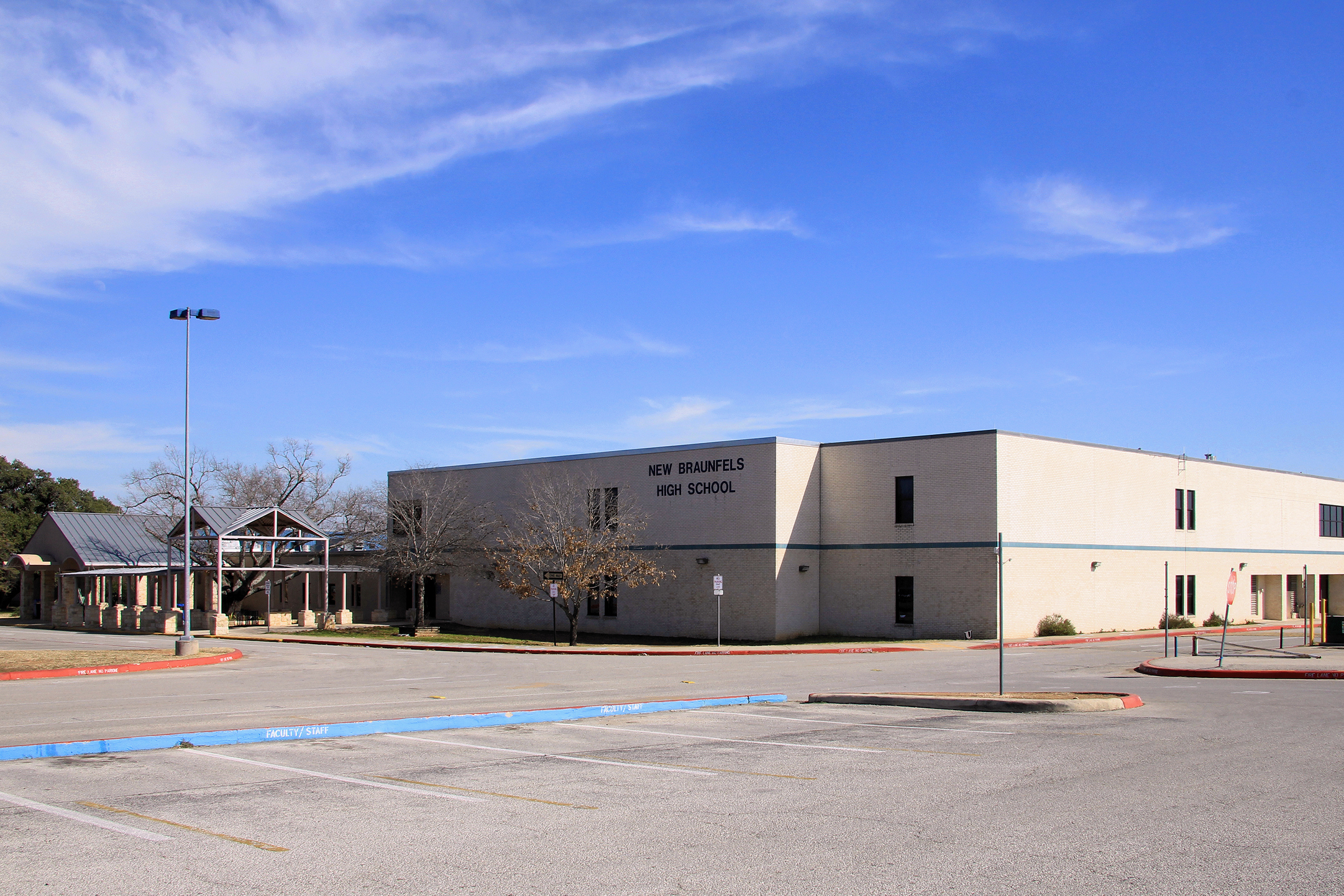

Location
- 2551 Loop 337 North; New Braunfels, Texas 78130; United States; 29°43′07″N 98°08′58″W

Information
- School type: Public high school
- Established: 1845; 181 years ago
- School district: New Braunfels Independent School District
- Principal: Gregory Hughes
- Teaching staff: 107.94 (FTE)
- Grades: 9–12
- Enrollment: 1,409 (2025–2026)
- Student to teacher ratio: 18.22
- Campus type: Suburban
- Colors: Royal Blue & White
- Athletics conference: UIL Class 5A
- Nickname: Unicorns
- Rivals: Canyon High School (New Braunfels, Texas)
- Website: nbisd.org/nbhs/

New Braunfels High School (commonly referred to as NBHS) is a public high school in New Braunfels, Texas, United States, that was established in 1845. In 2022, the school was given an overall rating of a B by the Texas Education Agency.

== Academics ==
In 2014-2015, New Braunfels High School students scored an average of 1023 (on the critical reading and math sections) on the SAT college admissions test. This is above the state and national averages, which are 956 and 1006 respectively.

== Demographics ==
The demographic breakdown in 2021-22 was:

- Male - 50.4%
- Female - 49.6%
- Native American/Alaskan - 0.3%
- Asian - 1.2%
- Black - 2.1%
- Hispanic - 46.3%
- Native Hawaiian/Pacific Islander - 0.1%
- White - 48%
- Multiracial - 2%

28.2% of the students were eligible for free or reduced lunch.

== Athletics ==
New Braunfels is classified as a 5A school by the University Interscholastic League (UIL). The New Braunfels Unicorns compete in the following sports:

- Baseball
- Basketball
- Cross Country
- Football
- Golf
- Marching Band
- Powerlifting
- Soccer
- Softball
- Swimming and Diving
- Tennis
- Track & Field
- Volleyball
- Wrestling

=== State titles ===
- Baseball
  - 2006 (4A)
- Girls Bowling
  - 2003 & 2007
- Girls Cross County
  - 1993 (4A), 1994 (4A), 1995 (4A), 2026 (5A)
- Boys Soccer
  - 1994 (All)
- Team Tennis
  - 2007 (4A), 2008 (5A), 2009 (5A), 2010 (5A), 2011 (5A), 2012 (5A), 2013 (5A), 2015 (6A)
- Girls Track
  - 1996 (4A)
- Volleyball
  - 2000 (4A), 2005 (4A)

== Notable alumni ==
- Nell Fortner, U.S. Olympic and college Women's Basketball coach
- Geoff Hangartner, former American football guard
- Devin Kelley, mass murderer
- Kliff Kingsbury, football coach
- James Langabeer, scientist and academic
- Bryce Miller (2017), professional baseball pitcher
- Leigh Nash, lead singer of Sixpence None the Richer
- George E. Nowotny, former Arkansas politician and businessman
- Damien Roberts, South African former professional tennis player
- Terry Tausch, former NFL guard
- Marja Tiura, Finnish politician
- Jordan Westburg (2017), professional baseball infielder
