= San Marcos Consolidated Independent School District =

School district in Texas, United States

Address
- 631 Mill Street San Marcos, Texas, 78666; United States

District information
- Grades: PK–12
- Schools: 11
- NCES District ID: 4838970

Students and staff
- Students: 8,311 (2023–2024)
- Teachers: 616.67 (on an FTE basis)
- Student–teacher ratio: 13.48:1

Other information
- Website: www.smcisd.net

San Marcos Consolidated Independent School District is a public school district based in San Marcos, Texas, USA. The school district covers 210 square miles mainly in Hays County and portions of Guadalupe and Caldwell counties.

In addition to San Marcos, the district also serves the towns of Martindale, Reedville and parts of Maxwell. The district extends into small portions of Caldwell and Guadalupe counties.

San Marcos High School is home to the San Marcos Fightin' Rattlers. Since 1911, the San Marcos Rattlers have been competing in sports with teams from the Austin and San Antonio area. Today the Rattlers compete at the Texas 6A level. They are one of the smallest 6A schools in the area. The football team won its district in 2000 and 2003 and went as far as the Regional Finals in 1999 and 2006. In 2017, the Fightin’ Rattlers won district and continued onto state playoffs.

== History ==
In 2004, San Marcos Consolidated ISD voters approved close to $123 million in bonds. These bonds paid for a new San Marcos High School that is able to serve over 2,500 students; as of 2006 San Marcos High School had a student population of 1,990. Also with the bond money, SMCISD built new elementary and middle schools throughout the district. The new San Marcos High School opened in August 2007, and all the elementary schools in the district were completed and opened by Fall of 2009.

In 2011, the school district was rated "academically acceptable" by the Texas Education Agency.

In May, 2013, San Marcos Consolidated ISD voters approved another $77 million in bonds.

In 2023 the district announced that elementary schools will receive guards who are equipped with weapons.

== Schools ==
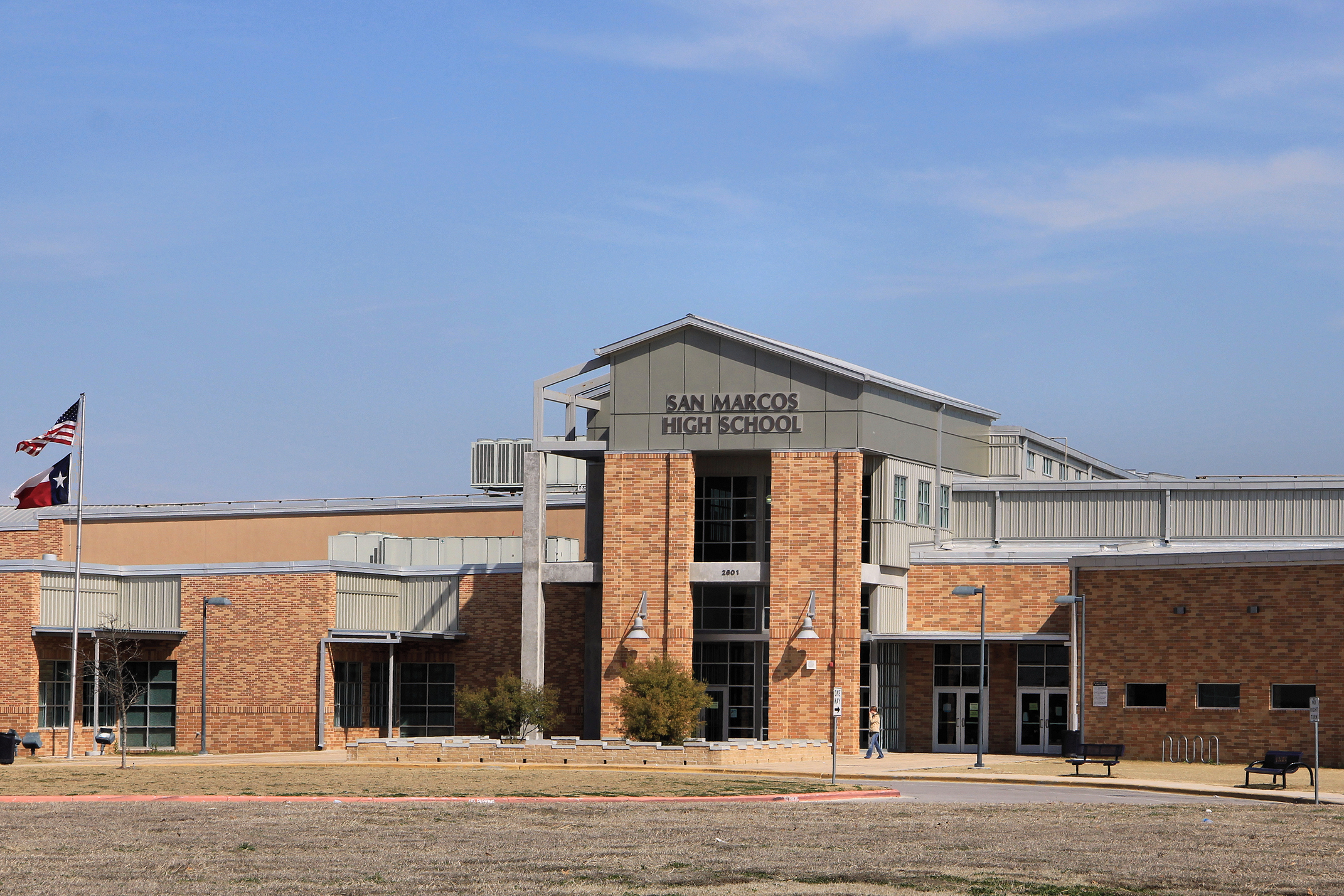
San Marcos High School

=== High School (Grades 9-12) ===
- San Marcos High School
- Phoenix Academy

=== Middle Schools (Grades 6-8) ===
- Miller Middle School
- Goodnight Middle School - TEA Recognized
  - 1999-2000 National Blue Ribbon School

=== Elementary Schools (PreK-5) ===
- Bonham PreKindergarten
- Bowie Elementary - TEA Exemplary
- Crockett Elementary - TEA Exemplary
- DeZavala Elementary - TEA Recognized
- Travis Elementary - TEA Recognized
- Hernandez Elementary - TEA Recognized
- Mendez Elementary (Opened in Fall 2009)
- Rodriguez Elementary
