= La Vernia, Texas =

- City
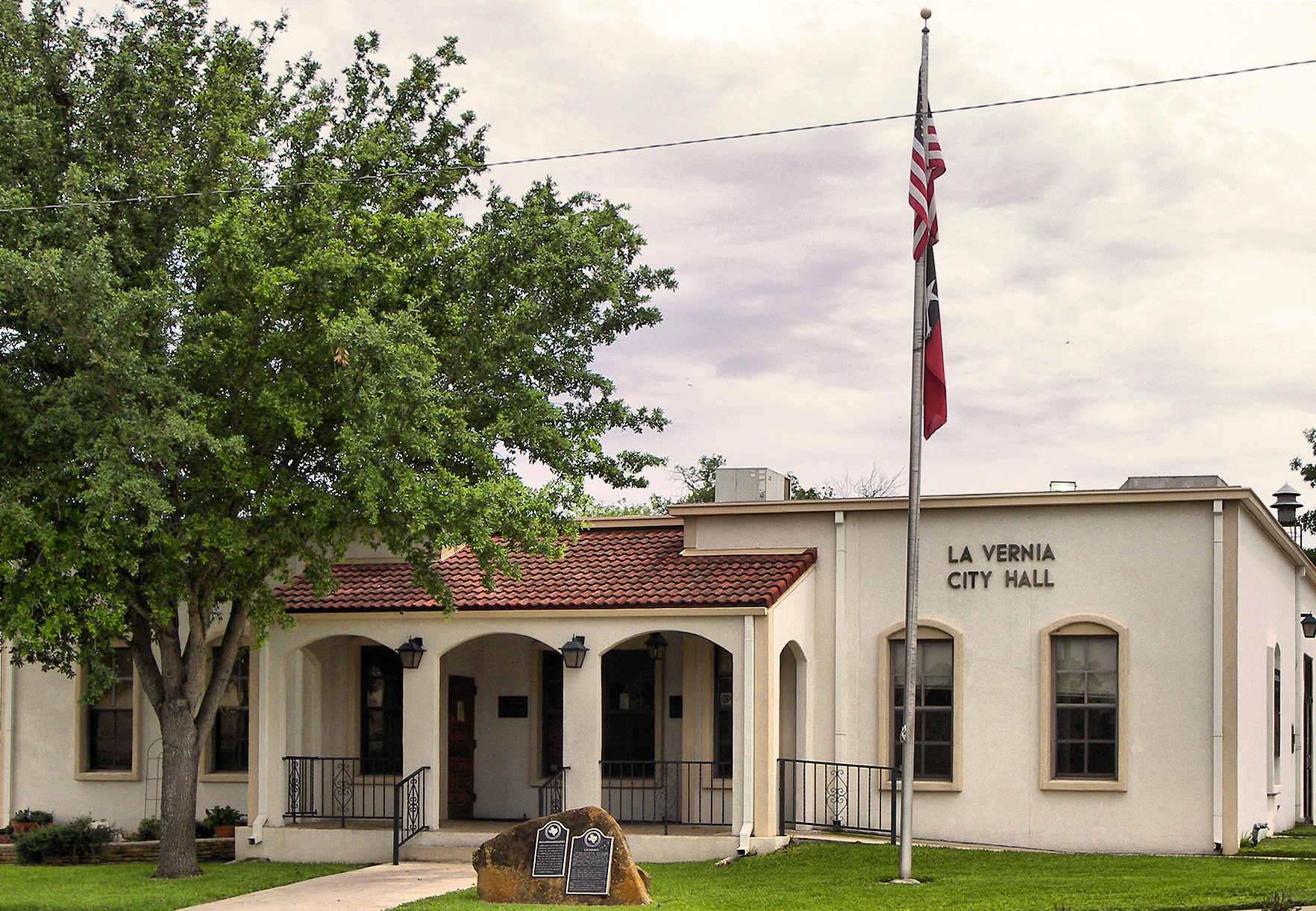
- Nicknames: L V, Bear Country
- Motto: This is Bear Country
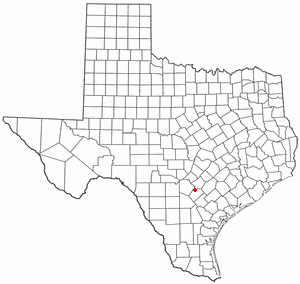
- Location of La Vernia, Texas

- Coordinates: 29°21′16″N 98°07′45″W
- Country: United States
- State: Texas
- County: Wilson

Area
  - Total: 2.39 sq mi (6.20 km^{2})
  - Land: 2.39 sq mi (6.19 km^{2})
  - Water: 0.0039 sq mi (0.01 km^{2})
- Elevation: 495 ft (151 m)

Population (2020)
  - Total: 1,077
  - Density: 597.7/sq mi (230.77/km^{2})
- Time zone: UTC−6 (Central (CST))
  - Summer (DST): UTC−5 (CDT)
- ZIP code: 78121
- Area code: 830
- FIPS code: 48-41764
- GNIS feature ID: 2411585
- Website: lavernia-tx.gov

La Vernia is a city in Wilson County, Texas, United States. La Vernia is on the south bank of Cibolo Creek at the junction of U.S. Highway 87 and Texas Farm to Market Road 775, approximately 25 miles east of downtown San Antonio. The population was 1,077 at the 2020 census. La Vernia is part of the San Antonio Metropolitan Statistical Area.

== History ==
The La Vernia area was first inhabited by the Coahuiltecan speaking peoples of Texas and subsequently by nomadic bands of Apache and Comanche who migrated to Texas in the 17th century. One of the earliest land grants made was to Erastus "Deaf" Smith. Smith married Guadalupe Ruiz Durán, a Mexican citizen, who was descended from one of the original Tejano or Spanish Texas families; and as such, received a land grant from the Mexican government on Cibolo Creek, north of present-day La Vernia in 1825. This area remained primarily unsettled by Europeans until 1837, when veterans from the Texas Revolution began to arrive.

La Vernia was first settled in earnest around 1850. W. R. Wiseman of Mississippi, who organized a Presbyterian church at the site around 1851, is said to have named the place Live Oak Grove, for a grove of trees nearby.

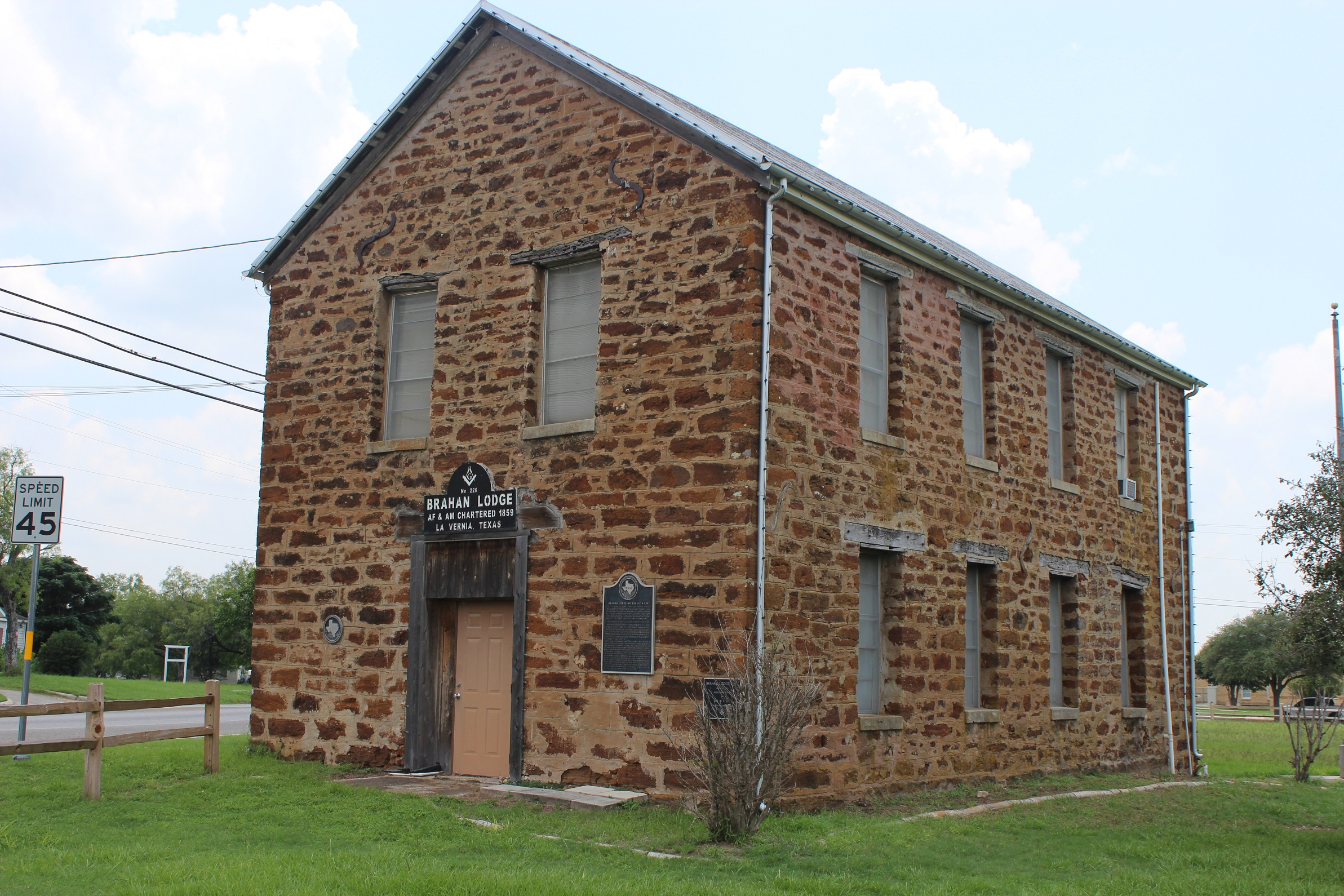
Brahan Masonic Lodge

In 1853 a post office was established under the name Post Oak. The town's name was changed to La Vernia in 1859. The name came from the local Spanish vernacular for green oaks (Lavernia is not Spanish for green oaks). Hence, The Brahan Masonic lodge was established in 1859. The building also served as a school and church.

German and Polish immigration brought the population to 110 by 1885. The community was now served by three churches, a steam gristmill, and a cotton gin. During this time, the major crops grown were corn and cotton, which are still major crops in the area today.

In 1890, La Vernia had a population of 200. Construction of the San Antonio and Gulf Railroad across the area in 1893 brought the population to 343 by 1900. A two-teacher school was in operation by 1896. Classes grew to be so large, that they had to move out of the Masonic lodge. The enrollment had grown to sixty-six children.

By 1915, the town operated two cotton gins, a bank, four churches, a pottery plant, a brick works, and supported a population of 500. In 1947, there were seventeen businesses recorded. In 1965, population had increased to 700 residents and twenty-five businesses.

The community incorporated around 1966, and in 1990, had a population of 639 and thirty-six businesses. La Vernia experienced a population drop as people began to migrate to the larger job markets available in neighboring San Antonio, Floresville and Canyon Lake.

In 2000, La Vernia had 136 businesses and a population of 931. The census of 2005 La Vernia had a population of 1,087 of people. In 2010 a new shopping area was built just west of town on Highway 87, including a new H-E-B grocery store and gas station. A longtime grocer, Baumann's Grocery store, closed at the time H-E-B opened.

== Geography ==
According to the United States Census Bureau, La Vernia has a total area of 2.4 square miles (6.2 km^{2}), all land.

== Demographics ==
Historical population
Census	Pop.	Note	%±
1970	425		—
1980	632		48.7%
1990	639		1.1%
2000	931		45.7%
2010	1,034		11.1%
2020	1,077		4.2%
U.S. Decennial Census

=== 2020 census ===
As of the 2020 census, La Vernia had a population of 1,077 and a median age of 42.0 years. 22.6% of residents were under the age of 18, 19.0% were 65 years of age or older, and for every 100 females there were 99.4 males; for every 100 females age 18 and over there were 85.7 males age 18 and over.

0.0% of residents lived in urban areas, while 100.0% lived in rural areas.

There were 437 households in La Vernia, of which 36.4% had children under the age of 18 living in them. Of all households, 51.0% were married-couple households, 15.1% were households with a male householder and no spouse or partner present, and 29.3% were households with a female householder and no spouse or partner present. About 23.6% of all households were made up of individuals and 12.6% had someone living alone who was 65 years of age or older.

There were 494 housing units, of which 11.5% were vacant. The homeowner vacancy rate was 1.7% and the rental vacancy rate was 11.7%.

Racial composition as of the 2020 census
Race	Number	Percent
White	842	78.2%
Black or African American	3	0.3%
American Indian and Alaska Native	8	0.7%
Asian	9	0.8%
Native Hawaiian and Other Pacific Islander	1	0.1%
Some other race	68	6.3%
Two or more races	146	13.6%
Hispanic or Latino (of any race)	297	27.6%

(Note: Note: the US Census treats Hispanic/Latino as an ethnic category. This table excludes Latinos from the racial categories and assigns them to a separate category. Hispanics/Latinos can be of any race.)

=== 2000 census ===
As of the 2000 census, there were 931 people, 317 households, and 239 families residing in the city. The population density was 482.8 inhabitants per square mile (186.4/km^{2}). There were 344 housing units at an average density of 178.4 per square mile (68.9/km^{2}). The racial makeup of the city was 92.48% White, 0.11% African American, 0.75% Native American, 0.64% Asian, 4.19% from other races, and 1.83% from two or more races. Hispanic or Latino of any race were 19.98% of the population.

There were 317 households, out of which 40.1% had children under the age of 18 living with them, 57.4% were married couples living together, 15.5% had a female householder with no husband present, and 24.6% were non-families. 21.1% of all households were made up of individuals, and 12.0% had someone living alone who was 65 years of age or older. The average household size was 2.65 and the average family size was 3.08.

In the city, the population was spread out, with 25.1% under the age of 18, 7.1% from 18 to 24, 27.2% from 25 to 44, 17.1% from 45 to 64, and 23.5% who were 65 years of age or older. The median age was 40 years. For every 100 females, there were 81.8 males. For every 100 females age 18 and over, there were 72.5 males.

The median income for a household in the city was $38,500, and the median income for a family was $46,912. Males had a median income of $35,625 versus $24,844 for females. The per capita income for the city was $19,931. About 12.5% of families and 12.3% of the population were below the poverty line, including 18.1% of those under age 18 and 12.6% of those age 65 or over.

La Vernia has a lower crime rate compared to surrounding towns. Statistics presented are based on data collected by the FBI as part of its Uniform Crime Reporting Program. These data represent offenses reported to and arrests made by State and local law enforcement agencies as reported to the FBI. Total 347, Murder is 2, Rape are 3, Robbery is 0, Aggravated Assault has recorded 38, Burglary 70, Larceny – theft is unusually high at 228, Motor vehicle thefts is at 6, and Coverage indicator is 100%.

== Education ==
La Vernia Independent School District with a total enrollment of 3182 students provides public education to the La Vernia. La Vernia Primary School includes grades pre-k through third grade. The newly constructed Intermediate School, opened in 2009, includes grades three to five. The building that now serves as the junior high was the first school building built for the La Vernia school district. Originally serving all grades, it now houses the sixth, seventh and eighth grades. La Vernia High School consists of grades nine to twelve.

Private school education is available at La Vernia Christian Teaching Center.

== Economy ==
La Vernia is located in the center of the Eagle Ford Shale Play, a source of petroleum and natural gas production, which is a significant economic driver of growth and development in South Texas.

The largest employers are La Vernia Independent School District and Guadalupe Valley Electric Cooperative. The highest percentage of employment is in the retail trade with grocery store H-E-B being the largest employer in that industry.

== Culture ==
The La Vernia Heritage Museum displays artifacts and memorabilia relating to the history and development of the city.

== Sports ==
La Vernia High School fields girls teams that compete in basketball, softball, soccer, cheerleading, track & field, tennis, volleyball and golf. The school has boys teams that compete in football, baseball, basketball, soccer, track & field, tennis, wrestling and golf.

La Vernia Little League has baseball and softball divisions for ages 4 to 16.

== Notable people ==
- Dusty Jonas, Olympic high jumper
- Austin Mahone, pop singer
- Jane Y. McCallum, Texas Secretary of State
- Hugh M. Tiner, the second president of Pepperdine University
