= New Braunfels Independent School District =

School district in Texas, United States

Address
- 1000 North Walnut New Braunfels, Texas, 78130; United States

District information
- Grades: PK–12
- Schools: 16
- NCES District ID: 4832370

Students and staff
- Students: 9,779 (2023–2024)
- Teachers: 626.22 (on an FTE basis)
- Student–teacher ratio: 15.62:1

Other information
- Website: nbisd.org

New Braunfels Independent School District (NBISD) is a public school district in New Braunfels, Texas, United States.

Located in Comal County, a small portion of the district extends into Guadalupe County.

In 2009, it was rated "academically acceptable" by the Texas Education Agency and it received a "B" under new standards put into place in 2018.

The district's population was growing at 3% annually as of 2019, slower than the neighboring Comal Independent School District.

== Schools ==
Due to 10% growth in the prior decade, the district issued a bond to open new school buildings, which were projected to open between 2021 and 2023. This also included the closure of the former New Braunfels High School Ninth Grade Center. The new Ninth Grade Center is planned to become Long Creek High School.

=== High school ===
- Grades 9-12
  - New Braunfels High School
  - Long Creek High School
- Grades 9-12
  - School of Choice

=== Middle schools ===
- Grades 6-8
  - New Braunfels Middle School
  - Oak Run Middle School

=== Elementary schools ===
- Grades K-5
  - Carl Schurz Elementary School
  - Klein Road Elementary School
  - Memorial Elementary School - Formerly known as Memorial Intermediate
  - Seele Elementary School
  - Walnut Springs Elementary School - Formerly known as Memorial Elementary
  - County Line Elementary School - Formerly known as Memorial Primary
  - Lamar Elementary School
  - Veramendi Elementary School
  - Voss Farms Elementary School
  - Legend Point Elementary School
- Pre-Kindergarten
  - Lone Star Early Childhood Center - Formerly known as Lone Star Elementary School
