= Geronimo, Texas =

- Census-designated place
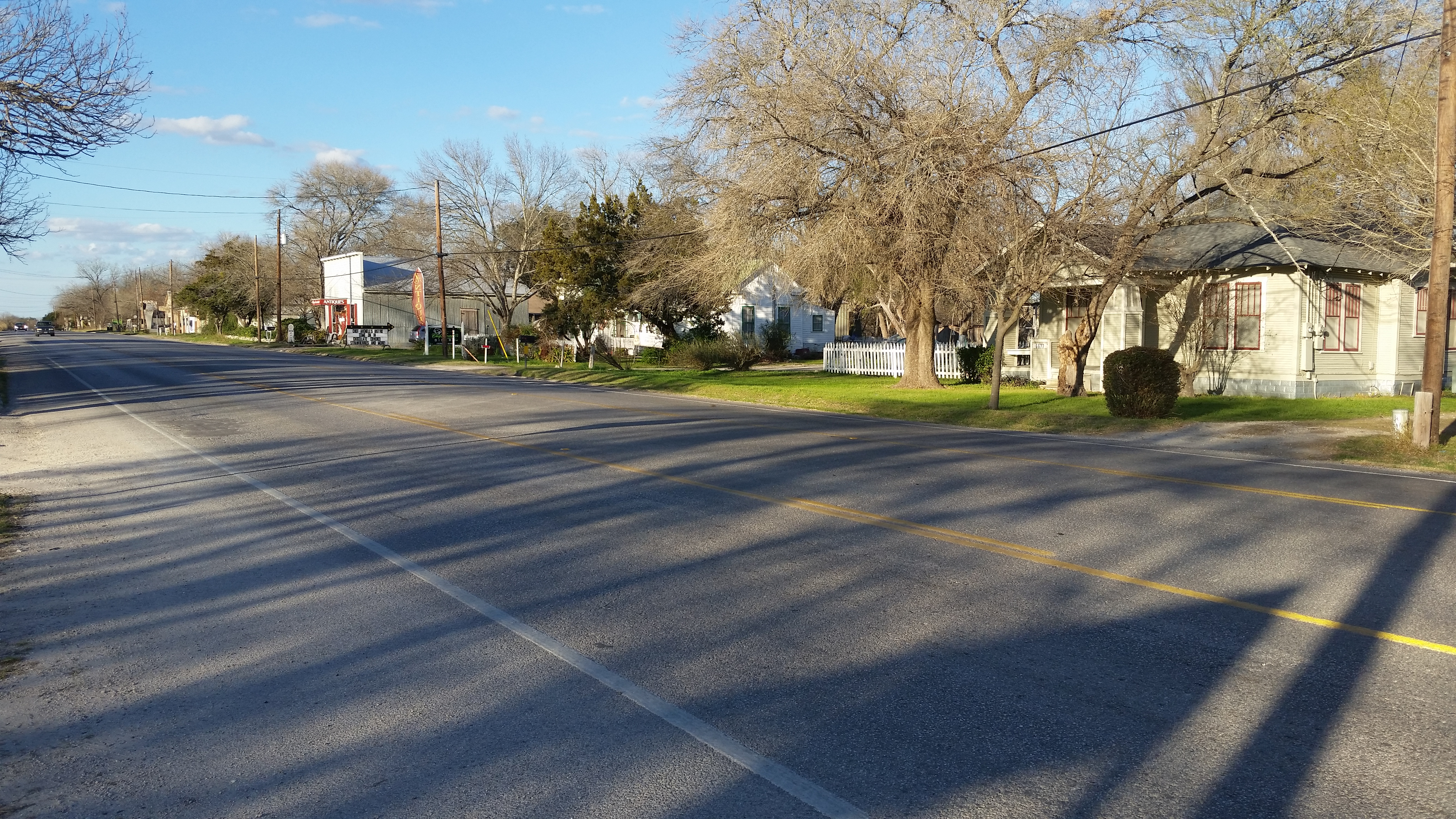

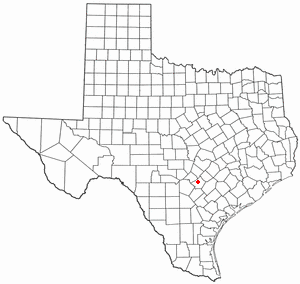
- Location of Geronimo, Texas

- Coordinates: 29°40′22″N 97°58′07″W
- Country: United States
- State: Texas
- County: Guadalupe

Area
  - Total: 8.1 sq mi (21.1 km^{2})
  - Land: 8.1 sq mi (21.1 km^{2})
  - Water: 0 sq mi (0.0 km^{2})
- Elevation: 571 ft (174 m)

Population (2020)
  - Total: 1,097
  - Density: 135/sq mi (52.0/km^{2})
- Time zone: UTC-6 (Central (CST))
  - Summer (DST): UTC-5 (CDT)
- ZIP code: 78155
- Area code: 830
- FIPS code: 48-29384
- GNIS feature ID: 2408292

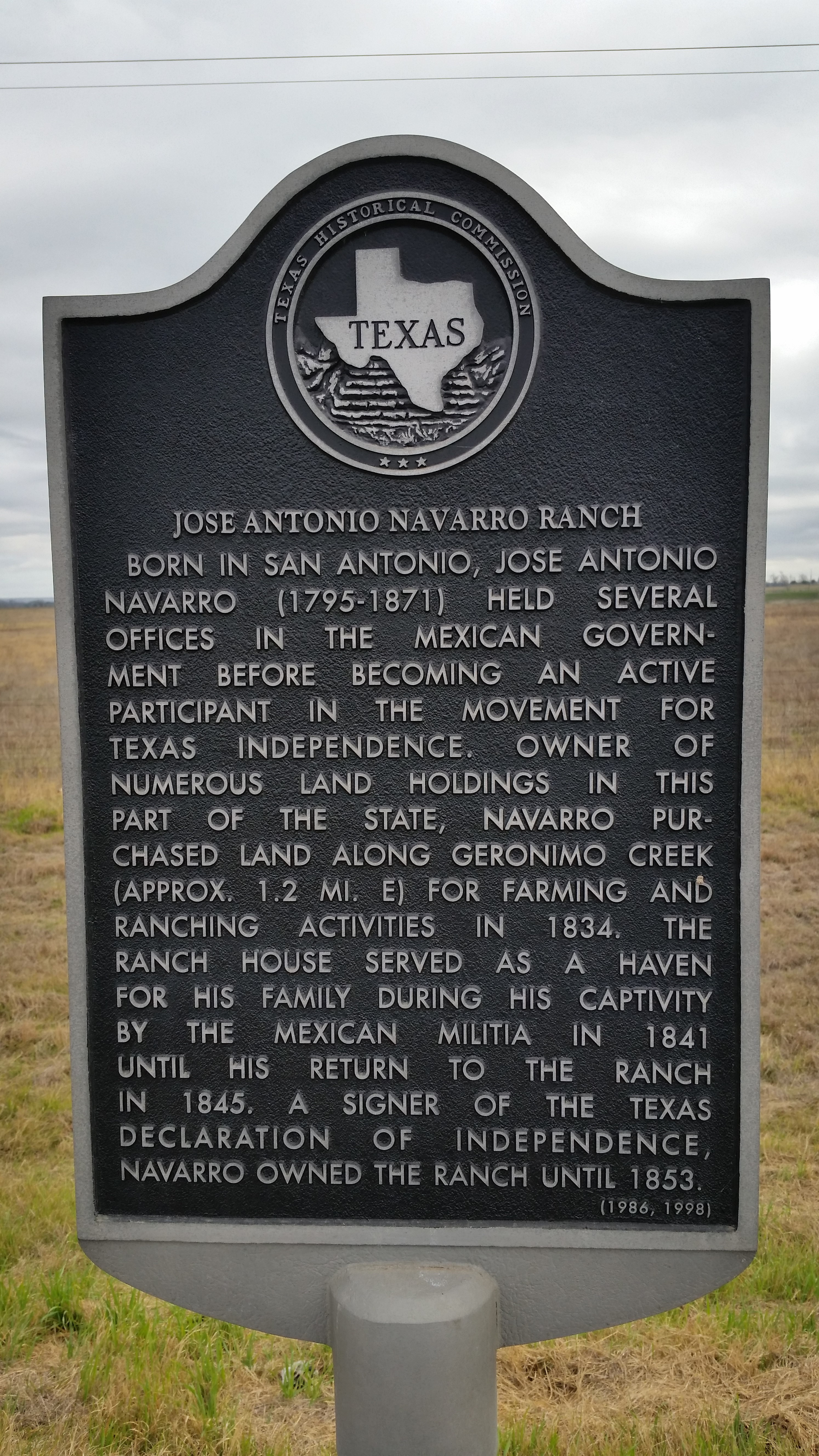
Navarro Ranch Texas Historical Marker south of Geronimo

Geronimo is an unincorporated community and census-designated place (CDP) in Guadalupe County, Texas, United States. The population was 1,097 at the 2020 census, up from 1,032 at the 2010 census. It is part of the San Antonio metropolitan area.

== History ==
In 1831 during the Mexican Texas period, James Bowie surveyed eleven leagues of land within the colony of Green DeWitt. Located on the northeast bank of the Guadalupe River, the area surrounded the natural springs called "Tio Geronimo". José Antonio Navarro purchased land and lived here later, 1840–1853. As a champion of human rights, he was a signer of the Texas Declaration of Independence, the Constitution of the Republic of Texas, and the Constitution of the State of Texas.

Navarro lived here on his 6,000-acre (24 km^{2}) San Geronimo Ranch. It was located on Geronimo Creek and named for Saint Jerome (translator of the Bible into Latin). The town and creek are named to honor this saint, although others claim that the name comes from original owner of the springs, "Tio" (Uncle) Geronimo Flores. José Antonio Navarro's brother, Luciano Navarro, also ran a ranch in the area. The area is about 6 miles (10 km) north of Seguin, the Guadalupe County seat.

In the mid-1800s, Geronimo became popular as a social center for German settlers. German settlers from Schumansville moved into the area in 1860 and formed a community. One enterprising settler opened a bank and German civic center. The community had grown into a small town by 1891, sporting a general store, a post office (former bank), a steam-powered cotton gin, and a population of twenty. A one-teacher school brought education to forty students in 1904. By 1917, the post office had relocated, sharing occupancy with a local feed store. In 1919, a park, complete with a spring-fed swimming pool, was constructed beside Geronimo Creek. After World War II, Geronimo hosted two gins and 123 residents.

== Geography ==
Geronimo is located in northern Guadalupe County along Texas State Highway 123, which leads north 15 miles (24 km) to San Marcos and south 6 miles (10 km) to Seguin, the Guadalupe County seat. New Braunfels is 13 miles (21 km) to the west via Farm-to-Market Roads.

According to the United States Census Bureau, the Geronimo CDP has a total area of 8.1 square miles (21.1 km^{2}), all land.

== Demographics ==
Historical population
Census	Pop.	Note	%±
2000	619		—
2010	1,032		66.7%
2020	1,097		6.3%
U.S. Decennial Census; 1850–1900 1910; 1920 1930 1940; 1950 1960 1970; 1980 1990 2000; 2010 2020

Geronimo first appeared as a census designated place in the 2000 U.S. census.

=== 2020 census ===
Geronimo CDP, Texas – Racial and ethnic composition Note: the US Census treats Hispanic/Latino as an ethnic category. This table excludes Latinos from the racial categories and assigns them to a separate category. Hispanics/Latinos may be of any race.
Race / Ethnicity (NH = Non-Hispanic)	Pop 2000	Pop 2010	Pop 2020	% 2000	% 2010	% 2020
White alone (NH)	320	468	490	51.70%	45.35%	44.67%
Black or African American alone (NH)	26	31	28	4.20%	3.00%	2.55%
Native American or Alaska Native alone (NH)	0	0	5	0.00%	0.00%	0.46%
Asian alone (NH)	0	7	0	0.00%	0.68%	0.00%
Native Hawaiian or Pacific Islander alone (NH)	0	0	1	0.00%	0.00%	0.09%
Other race alone (NH)	5	1	2	0.81%	0.10%	0.18%
Mixed race or Multiracial (NH)	7	2	30	1.13%	0.19%	2.73%
Hispanic or Latino (any race)	261	523	541	42.16%	50.68%	49.32%
Total	619	1,032	1,097	100.00%	100.00%	100.00%

=== 2000 census ===
As of the census of 2000, there were 619 people, 194 households, and 157 families residing in the CDP. The population density was 67.5 inhabitants per square mile (26.1/km^{2}). There were 209 housing units at an average density of 22.8/sq mi (8.8/km^{2}). The racial makeup of the CDP was 72.21% White, 4.20% African American, 20.84% from other races, and 2.75% from two or more races. Hispanic or Latino of any race were 42.16% of the population.

There were 194 households, out of which 49.5% had children under the age of 18 living with them, 62.9% were married couples living together, 12.4% had a female householder with no husband present, and 18.6% were non-families. 13.9% of all households were made up of individuals, and 4.6% had someone living alone who was 65 years of age or older. The average household size was 3.19 and the average family size was 3.56.

In the CDP, the population was spread out, with 36.2% under the age of 18, 5.5% from 18 to 24, 31.2% from 25 to 44, 17.8% from 45 to 64, and 9.4% who were 65 years of age or older. The median age was 33 years. For every 100 females, there were 97.8 males. For every 100 females age 18 and over, there were 92.7 males.

The median income for a household in the CDP was $46,761, and the median income for a family was $47,273. Males had a median income of $36,806 versus $23,750 for females. The per capita income for the CDP was $17,569. None of the families and 1.5% of the population were living below the poverty line, including no under eighteens and none of those over 64.

== Education ==
Geronimo is served by the Navarro Independent School District.

== Attractions ==
Geronimo has turned into a day-trip destination for travelers from the Hill Country, Austin, San Antonio and the Valley. Geronimo is home to five antique shops: Blue Hills Antique Mall, Elsie's Attic, Geronimo Antiques, and two other locations inside the town. Geronimo is famed for its annual BBQ & Chili Cook-Offs and VFW raffle and auction. The local VFW Post 8456 (located in the previous general store) holds country and western dances almost every Sunday afternoon in Texas Hill Country dance hall tradition.
