= Navarro Independent School District =

School district in Texas, United States

Address
- 6450 North State Highway 123 Seguin, Texas, 78155; United States
- Coordinates: 29.6572°N 97.9670°W

District information
- Type: Public
- Grades: PK–12
- Schools: 4
- NCES District ID: 4832160

Students and staff
- Students: 2,702 (2025–2026)
- Teachers: 182.54 (on an FTE basis) (2025–2026)
- Staff: 167.04 (on an FTE basis) (2025–2026)
- Student–teacher ratio: 14.80 (2025–2026)

Other information
- Website: www.navarroisd.us

Navarro Independent School District (NISD) is a public school district based in the community of Geronimo, Texas, United States.

In 2009, the school district was rated "academically acceptable" by the Texas Education Agency.

== Schools ==
- Navarro High (grades 9–12)
- Navarro Junior High (grades 7–8)
- Navarro Intermediate (grades 4–6)
- Navarro Elementary (prekindergarten-grade 3)

After much debate and several rounds of voting (mainly about funding), NISD approved the building of a new high school to cope with the growing number of students. This new high school first officially welcomed students in the fall of the 2006 school year.

NISD is housed on four campuses (High School, Junior High, Intermediate, and Elementary). The new high school building was built on what was originally the baseball field, thus causing a new baseball field to be built next to the already existing softball field. The current junior high has taken the former high school building, which many years earlier had housed all the campuses. The past intermediate school is in the former middle school, which when first built, housed the elementary. Since then, a new intermediate school has been built.

Their school mascot is a Panther. School colors are purple and gold.

== Members of the Navarro ISD School Board ==
- President: Renee Rehfeld
- Vice president: Hank Dietert
- Secretary: Donna Gilliam
- Assistant secretary: Clint Scheib
- Members: Tracy Large, Melissa Sartain, Brian Sheffler
