= 2024 Abilene Christian Wildcats football team =

American college football season

2024 Abilene Christian Wildcats football

UAC champion

NCAA Division I Second Round, L 31–51 vs. North Dakota State
- Conference: United Athletic Conference

Ranking
- STATS: No. 14
- FCS Coaches: No. 14
- Record: 9–5 (7–1 UAC)
- Head coach: Keith Patterson (3rd season)
- Offensive coordinator: Rick Bowie (1st season)
- Offensive scheme: Air raid
- Co-defensive coordinators: Aaron Fletcher (1st season); Jarred Holley (1st season)
- Base defense: Multiple 3–3–5
- Home stadium: Wildcat Stadium

2024 United Athletic Conference standings
	Conf.			Overall
Team	W		L	W		L
No. 14 Abilene Christian $^	7	–	1	9	–	5
No. 13 Tarleton State ^	6	–	2	10	–	4
No. 21 Eastern Kentucky ^	6	–	2	8	–	5
Southern Utah	6	–	2	7	–	5
Central Arkansas	3	–	5	6	–	6
Austin Peay	3	–	5	4	–	8
North Alabama	3	–	5	3	–	9
West Georgia*	1	–	7	4	–	7
Utah Tech	1	–	7	1	–	11
$ – Conference champion; ^ – FCS playoff participant; Note: West Georgia is ineligible for the UAC title and FCS postseason play due to transition from NCAA Division II.; Rankings from STATS Poll

The 2024 Abilene Christian Wildcats football team represented Abilene Christian University as a member of the United Athletic Conference (UAC) during the 2024 NCAA Division I FCS football season. The Wildcats were coached by third-year head coach Keith Patterson and played at Wildcat Stadium in Abilene, Texas.

== Preseason ==
=== UAC coaches' poll ===
UAC coaches' poll
Predicted finish	Team	Votes (1st place)
1	Central Arkansas	77 (5)
2	Tarleton State	74 (3)
3	Southern Utah	54
4	Eastern Kentucky	53
5	Austin Peay	46 (1)
6	Abilene Christian	43
7	North Alabama	26
8	Utah Tech	19
9	West Georgia	13

== Schedule ==
Date	Time	Opponent	Rank	Site	TV	Result	Attendance
August 31	6:30 p.m.	at Texas Tech*		Jones AT&T Stadium; Lubbock, TX	ESPN+	L 51–52 ^{OT}	60,229
September 7	7:00 p.m.	West Georgia		Wildcat Stadium; Abilene, TX	ESPN+	W 38–24	7,094
September 14	3:00 p.m.	at Northern Colorado*	No. 25	Nottingham Field; Greeley, CO	ESPN+	W 24–22	3,017
September 21	7:00 p.m.	No. 4 Idaho*	No. 19	Wildcat Stadium; Abilene, TX	ESPN+	L 24–27	11,719
September 28	8:00 p.m.	at Utah Tech	No. 20	Greater Zion Stadium; St. George, UT	ESPN+	W 55–30	5,451
October 5	3:00 p.m.	No. 5 Central Arkansas	No. 16	Wildcat Stadium; Abilene, TX	ESPN+	W 41–34	7,853
October 12	6:00 p.m.	at North Alabama	No. 10	Braly Municipal Stadium; Florence, AL	ESPN+	L 34–47	9,918
October 19	3:00 p.m.	Eastern Kentucky^{†}	No. 17	Wildcat Stadium; Abilene, TX	ESPN+	W 34–20	10,411
November 2	3:00 p.m.	Southern Utah	No. 17	Wildcat Stadium; Abilene, TX	ESPN+	W 28–25	9,701
November 9	3:00 p.m.	at Austin Peay	No. 15	Fortera Stadium; Clarksville, TN	ESPN+	W 35–34	3,741
November 16	6:00 p.m.	at No. 13 Tarleton State	No. 14	Memorial Stadium; Stephenville, TX	ESPN+	W 35–31	22,348
November 23	2:00 p.m.	at Stephen F. Austin*	No. 11	Homer Bryce Stadium; Nacogdoches, TX	ESPN+	L 19–32	4,208
November 30	2:00 p.m.	No. 17 Northern Arizona*	No. 15	Wildcat Stadium; Abilene, TX (NCAA Division I First Round)	ESPN+	W 24–0	5,210
December 7	2:00 p.m.	at No. 3 North Dakota State*	No. 15	Fargodome; Fargo, ND (NCAA Division I Second Round)	ESPN+	L 31–51	10,373
*Non-conference game; ^{†}Homecoming; Rankings from STATS Poll released prior to the game; All times are in Central time

== Rankings ==
Ranking movements Legend: ██ Increase in ranking ██ Decrease in ranking — = Not ranked RV = Received votes т = Tied with team above or below
	Week														
Poll	Pre	1	2	3	4	5	6	7	8	9	10	11	12	13	Final
STATS	—	RV	25	19	20	16	10	17	17	15	14	11	15	15	14
Coaches'	—	RV	RV	23	22	17	12	21т	19	16	13	12	17	17	14

== Roster ==
No.	Player	Class	Height	Weight	Previous Schools		Hometown
No.	Player	Class	Height	Weight	High School	College	Hometown
Quarterbacks
1	Maverick McIvor	Graduate Student	6-2	210	Central High School	Texas Tech	San Angelo, Texas
9	Carson Haggard	RS Sophomore	6-0	180	Gulliver Prep	Tulane	Miami, Florida
12	Quayde Hawkins	RS Junior	6-1	210	Bainbridge High School	Troy	Bainbridge, Georgia
15	Carson May	RS Sophomore	6-4	220	Jones High School	Iowa - Wyoming	Jones, Oklahoma
17	Trevor Baker	RS Junior	6-3	195	Needville High School		Needville, Texas
18	Leighton Adams	Freshman	6-1	200	New Braunfels High School		New Braunfels, Texas
Running Backs
3	Rovaughn Banks, Jr.	Junior	5-10	190	Union High School		Tulsa, Oklahoma
6	Samuel Hicks	Graduate Student	5-9	190	Nolan Catholic High School	Saddleback College - Central Michigan	Fort Worth, Texas
21	Deonte Dean	Freshman	6-0	190	Lake Highlands High School		Dallas, Texas
23	Isaiah Johnson	Graduate Student	5-10	210	Cooper High School	North Texas	Lubbock, Texas
26	Jordon Vaughn	RS Junior	6-3	235	Manvel High School	Wyoming	Manvel, Texas
32	Chad Lara	Freshman	5-6	195	Abilene High School		Abilene, Texas
Wide Receiver
2	Hut Graham	RS Sophomore	6-1	200	Gunter High School	Texas Tech	Gunter, Texas
4	J.J. Henry	Junior	5-10	155	McKinney North High School	Ole Miss	McKinney, Texas
7	Trey Cleveland	Graduate Student	6-2	195	Arlington High School	North Texas	Arlington, Texas
8	Jeshari Houston	RS Junior	5-9	180	Abilene High School	Tulsa	Abilene, Texas
13	Blayne Taylor	Graduate Student	6-5	215	Saginaw High School	Cisco College	Saginaw, Texas
14	Raydrian Baltrip	Freshman	5-9	155	Silsbee High School		Silsbee, Texas
16	Luke Moffitt	Sophomore	6-0	170	Crandall High School		Crandall, Texas
19	Javon Gipson	RS Junior	6-4	215	George Ranch High School	Baylor	Richmond, Texas
20	Nehemiah Martinez	Senior	5-9	200	Cooper High School	Texas Tech	Lubbock, Texas
25	Blake Pruitt	Sophomore	5-11	185	Midland Christian		Midland, Texas
29	J.R. Ceyanes	Sophomore	6-3	200	Katy High School		Katy, Texas
31	Brelon Badon	Freshman	5-11	165	Abilene High School		Abilene, Texas
34	Blake Suber	Freshman	6-1	195	Cedar Park High School		Cedar Park, Texas
81	Grant Jones	Freshman	6-1	185	Burnet High School		Burnet, Texas
82	Courtlin Scott	Sophomore	5-7	140	Sachse High School		Sachse, Texas
84	Jacoby Boykins	RS Junior	6-1	195	Lamar High School	Alabama	Houston, Texas
Tight Ends
83	West Wilson	Sophomore	6-2	235	Lovejoy High School	North Texas	Allen, Texas
86	Chidubem Lebechi	RS Sophomore	6-2	240	Tompkins High School		Katy, Texas
87	Bryan Henry	RS Sophomore	6-2	250	Belton High School	Houston	Belton, Texas
88	Jed Castles	RS Junior	6-7	235	Rider High School	Texas Tech	Wichita Falls, Texas
89	Gavin Waits	Sophomore	6-4	230	Fulshear High School		Fulshear, Texas
Offensive Line
54	Carson Walker	RS Junior	6-4	315	Heritage High School	Houston	Midlothian, Texas
55	Alan Hatten	Senior	6-3	310	Hackettstown High School	Lackawanna College	Great Meadows, New Jersey
57	Trent Pullen	RS Senior	6-3	295	Connally High School	Oklahoma State	Waco, Texas
59	Jacob Thielen	Graduate Student	6-4	305	Faith Christian Academy		Broomfield, Colorado
61	Dylan Kinney	RS Sophomore	6-3	310	Travis High School		Richmond, Texas
66	Dylan Howerton	Fifth Year	6-5	280	Katy High School		Katy, Texas
68	Colter Lynch	Sophomore	6-3	305	Cooper High School		Lubbock, Texas
70	Tay Yanta	RS Senior	6-5	330	Falls City High School	Mary Hardin–Baylor - Texas Tech	Falls City, Texas
71	Femi Sakiri	RS Junior	6-3	300	Byron Nelson High School	UConn	Roanoke, Texas
75	Cameron Vann	Freshman	6-6	320	Wylie High School		Abilene, Texas
76	Joziah Fogle	Junior	6-4	310	Spring High School		Spring, Texas
77	George French II	RS Senior	6-8	315	Bethlehem Catholic High School	Pittsburgh	Bethlehem, Pennsylvania
Defensive Line
9	Alex Bowman, Jr.	RS Sophomore	6-2	255	Madison High		Dallas, Texas
43	Elijah Sims	RS Freshman	6-3	260	Fort Bend Marshal		Missouri City, Texas
52	Jordan Butler	RS Senior	6-3	320	IMG Academy	Northwestern	Las Vegas, Nevada
90	Kaghen Roach	RS Senior	6-5	255	Celina HS	Blinn College - North Texas	Celina, Texas
91	Colt Cooper	RS Junior	6-4	245	Ford High School		Quinlan, Texas
92	Luke Gambs	Sophomore	6-2	250	S. H. Rider High School		Wichita Falls, Texas
93	Chris Herpin	Sophomore	6-2	300	Dawson High School		Pearland, Texas
95	Jerry Lawson	Sophomore	6-2	295	Breckenridge High School		Breckenridge, Texas
98	David Oke	Junior	6-2	290	Alief Hastings High School		Houston, Texas
99	Devin Dawson	RS Senior	6-2	300	Lone Star High School	Alcorn State	Aledo, Texas
Linebackers
0	Darius Moore	Senior	6-1	235	El Reno High School	Northeastern Oklahoma A&M	El Reno, Oklahoma
1	Will Shaffer	Graduate Student	6-0	240	Saguaro High School	Utah State - Arizona State	Tempe, Arizona
6	Izaiah Kelley	Senior	6-2	200	Coronado High School	SMU	Lubbock, Texas
8	Chris Wright	RS Junior	6-4	240	Aledo High School	North Texas	Aledo, Texas
14	Rashon Myles, Jr.	RS Sophomore	6-1	223	Brownsburg High School	Northern Illinois	Brownsburg, Indiana
17	Micho Lavine	Freshman	6-1	200	Millwood High School		Oklahoma City, Oklahoma
19	Jameer Dudley	Sophomore	6-2	205	Samuel Clemens High School		Schertz, Texas
24	Bryce Morton	RS Freshman	6-1	215	C.E. King High School		Spring, Texas
30	Sean Dubose, Jr.	RS Sophomore	6-2	240	Tompkins High School		Katy, Texas
35	Ethan Taite	Senior	6-2	225	Independence High School		Frisco, Texas
36	Jailyn Gibbs	Freshman	6-1	215	Rider High School		Wichita Falls, Texas
37	Trace Low	Freshman	6-0	195	Legacy High School		Wichita Falls, Texas
42	Reese Young	Junior	6-1	225	Stephenville High School		Stephenville, Texas
46	Cirby Coheley	Senior	6-4	220	Iowa Park High School		Iowa Park, Texas
Defensive back
2	Jordan Mukes	Junior	6-3	210	Choctaw High School	Oklahoma	Choctaw, Oklahoma
4	Tyson Williams	Sophomore	5-11	180	Bixby High School		Bixby, Oklahoma
12	DeAngelo Ponder	RS Freshman	6-2	190	Bowie High School		Arlington, Texas
15	Sam Mason, Jr.	RS Sophomore	6-0	190	Charter Oak High School	Oregon State	Covina, California
18	Gabe White	Sophomore	6-2	205	Goose Creek High School	Butler CC	Charleston, South Carolina
20	Damien Johnson	Freshman	5-10	180	Legacy High School		Midland, Texas
21	Carson Finney	Freshman	6-0	180	Brock High School		Brock, Texas
27	Harold West	RS Junior	6-1	185	Lamar High School	North Texas	Arlington, Texas
Safety
3	Dorian Plumley	RS Junior	6-0	200	El Reno High School	Oklahoma	El Reno, Oklahoma
5	Javen Ware	Senior	5-11	175	Hernando High School	Texas State	Hernando, Mississippi
7	Elijah Moffett	RS Senior	6-2	210	Veterans Memorial High School		Selma, Texas
41	T.J. Marshall	RS Senior	6-1	210	Shadow Creek High School	Houston	Pearland, Texas
Punter
22	Grant Nickel	RS Junior	6-1	185	Grand Oaks High School	Texas Tech	Spring, Texas
33	Hugo Nash	RS Sophomore	6-2	195	Scotch College	James Madison	Melbourne, Australia
Kicker
39	Kyler Meschi	RS Freshman	6-0	185	Flour Bluff High School		Corpus Christi, Texas
40	Elijah Medina	RS Freshman	6-0	180	Grace Preparatory Academy	Sul Ross State	Mansfield, Texas
45	Cade Coulson	Sophomore	6-2	160	Richland High School	Mary Hardin–Baylor	Fort Worth, Texas
47	Will Chipman	Freshman	5-8	155	Southwest Christian School		Fort Worth, Texas
48	Ritse Vaes	Senior	6-2	160	Hirschi High School	Midwestern State	Wichita Falls, Texas
94	Spencer Fiske	RS Sophomore	5-10	160	Hidden Valley High School	College of Idaho	Grants Pass, Oregon
Long Snapper
49	Devan Daugherty	RS Senior	6-2	250	Aledo High School	Midwestern State	Aledo, Texas
50	Justin Duff	RS Senior	6-3	250	Armijo High School	UTEP	San Pablo, California

== Game summaries ==
=== at Texas Tech (FBS) ===
Abilene Christian Wildcats at Texas Tech Red Raiders (FBS) – Game summary

Quarter	1	2	3	4	OT	Total
Wildcats	7	14	7	17	6	51
Red Raiders (FBS)	22	10	7	6	7	52

at Jones AT&T Stadium, Lubbock, Texas

- Date: August 31
- Game time: 7:00 p.m. CDT
- Game weather: Sunny
- Game attendance: 60,229
- Referee: Tim Rich
- TV announcers (ESPN+): Ted Emrich and Dave Steckel
- Box score, Recap

Game information
First quarter
- TTU – Tahj Brooks 18-yard run (Gino Garcia kick), 10:38. Red Raiders 7–0. Drive: 10 plays, 71 yards, 3:28.
- TTU – Coy Eakin 4-yard pass from Behren Morton (Jalin Conyers run), 8:18. Red Raiders 15–0. Drive: 2 plays, 17 yards, 0:24.
- ACU – Jed Castles 31-yard pass from Maverick McIvor (Ritse Vaes kick), 3:42. Red Raiders 15–7. Drive: 9 plays, 80 yards, 4:36.
- TTU – Coy Eakin 35-yard pass from Behren Morton (Reese Burkhardt kick), 1:34. Red Raiders 22–7. Drive: 6 plays, 75 yards, 2:08.

Second quarter

- ACU – Isaiah Johnson 2-yard run (Ritse Vaes kick), 11:52. Red Raiders 22–14. Drive: 11 plays, 75 yards, 4:42.
- TTU – Gino Garcia 39-yard field goal, 9:58. Red Raiders 25–14. Drive: 4 plays, 5 yards, 1:38.
- TTU – Jalin Conyers 36-yard pass from Behren Morton (Reese Burkhardt kick), 2:55. Red Raiders 32–14. Drive: 9 plays, 70 yards, 3:51.
- ACU – Blayne Taylor 71-yard pass from Maverick McIvor (Ritse Vaes kick), 1:50. Red Raiders 32–21. Drive: 3 plays, 75 yards, 1:05.

Third quarter

- ACU – Rovaughn Banks Jr. 1-yard run (Ritse Vaes kick), 5:10. Red Raiders 32–28. Drive: 10 plays, 96 yards, 4:27.
- TTU – Josh Kelly 35-yard pass from Behren Morton (Gino Garcia kick), 4:50. Red Raiders 39–28. Drive: 1 play, 35 yards, 0:07.

Fourth quarter

- ACU – Nehemiah Martinez I 30-yard pass from Maverick McIvor (Ritse Vaes kick), 11:45. Red Raiders 39–35. Drive: 4 plays, 62 yards, 1:34.
- TTU – Reese Burkhardt 41-yard field goal, 8:32. Red Raiders 42–35. Drive: 9 plays, 52 yards, 3:13.
- ACU – Isaiah Johnson 5-yard run (Ritse Vaes kick), 4:55. Tied 42–42. Drive: 8 plays, 75 yards, 3:37.
- TTU – Gino Garcia 31-yard field goal, 2:35. Red Raiders 45–42. Drive: 9 plays, 54 yards, 2:13.
- ACU – Ritse Vaes 21-yard field goal, 0:05. Tied 45–45. Drive: 12 plays, 71 yards, 2:34.

Overtime

- TTU – Caleb Douglas 14-yard pass from Behren Morton (Reese Burkhardt kick). Red Raiders 52–51. Drive: 5 plays, 25 yards.
- ACU – Isaiah Johnson 1-yard run (run failed). Red Raiders 52–51. Drive: 6 plays, 25 yards.

Statistics	ACU	TTU
First downs	30	27
Total yards	615	539
Rushing yards	109	161
Passing yards	506	378
Turnovers	1	0
Time of possession	33:48	26:07

Team	Category	Player	Statistics
Abilene Christian	Passing	Maverick McIvor	36/51, 506 yards, 3 TD
Abilene Christian	Rushing	Isaiah Johnson	13 rushes, 42 yards, 3 TD
Abilene Christian	Receiving	Blayne Taylor	7 receptions, 141 yards, TD
Texas Tech	Passing	Behren Morton	30/42, 378 yards, 5 TD
Texas Tech	Rushing	Tahj Brooks	27 rushes, 153 yards, TD
Texas Tech	Receiving	Josh Kelly	10 receptions, 156 yards, TD

=== West Georgia ===
West Georgia Wolves at Abilene Christian Wildcats – Game summary

Quarter	1	2	3	4	Total
Wolves	0	3	7	14	24
Wildcats	14	0	7	17	38

at Wildcat Stadium, Abilene, Texas

- Date: September 7
- Game time: 7:00 p.m. CDT
- Game weather: Sunny
- Game attendance: 7,094
- Referee: Michael Frain
- TV announcers (ESPN+): Grant Boone and Bob Shipley
- Box score, Recap

Game information
First quarter
- ACU – Sam Hicks 27-yard run (Ritse Vaes kick), 12:24. Wildcats 7–0. Drive: 7 plays, 77 yards, 2:31.
- ACU – Nehemiah Martinez I 20-yard pass from Maverick McIvor (Ritse Vaes kick), 2:18. Wildcats 14–0. Drive: 10 plays, 67 yards, 4:28.

Second quarter

- UWG – Chance Gagnon 31-yard field goal, 11:22. Wildcats 14–3. Drive: 7 plays, 17 yards, 2:35.

Third quarter

- ACU – Nehemiah Martinez I 72-yard pass from Maverick McIvor (Ritse Vaes kick), 11:38. Wildcats 21–3. Drive: 2 plays, 73 yards, 0:50.
- UWG – Dylan Gary 27-yard pass from Quincy Casey (Chance Gagnon kick), 5:20. Wildcats 21–10. Drive: 1 play, 27 yards, 0:06.

Fourth quarter

- ACU – Ritse Vaes 27-yard field goal, 12:31. Wildcats 24–10. Drive: 16 plays, 81 yards, 7:47.
- UWG – Dylan Gary 22-yard pass from Quincy Casey (Chance Gagnon kick), 10:02. Wildcats 24–17. Drive: 9 plays, 80 yards, 2:22.
- ACU – Isaiah Johnson 3-yard run (Ritse Vaes kick), 5:01. Wildcats 31–17. Drive: 10 plays, 75 yards, 4:55.
- ACU – Bryan Henry 18-yard pass from Maverick McIvor (Ritse Vaes kick), 3:35. Wildcats 38–17. Drive: 4 plays, 31 yards, 1:16.
- UWG – Quincy Casey 2-yard run (Chance Gagnon kick), 0:01. Wildcats 38–24. Drive: 13 plays, 75 yards, 3:34.

Statistics	UWG	ACU
First downs	22	28
Total yards	344	499
Rushing yards	102	202
Passing yards	242	297
Turnovers	1	2
Time of possession	26:06	33:54

Team	Category	Player	Statistics
West Georgia	Passing	Quincy Casey	14/34, 201 yards, 2 TD, INT
West Georgia	Rushing	Quincy Casey	9 rushes, 50 yards, TD
West Georgia	Receiving	Dylan Gary	7 receptions, 153 yards, 2 TD
Abilene Christian	Passing	Maverick McIvor	24/37, 297 yards, 3 TD
Abilene Christian	Rushing	Isaiah Johnson	14 rushes, 71 yards, TD
Abilene Christian	Receiving	Nehemiah Martinez I	7 receptions, 132 yards, 2 TD

=== at Northern Colorado ===
No. 25 Abilene Christian Wildcats at Northern Colorado Bears – Game summary

Quarter	1	2	3	4	Total
No. 25 Wildcats	0	7	14	3	24
Bears	3	7	0	12	22

at Nottingham Field, Greeley, Colorado

- Date: September 14
- Game time: 3:00 p.m. CDT/2:00 p.m. MDT
- Game weather: Sunny, 85 °F (29 °C)
- Game attendance: 3,017
- Referee: Gregg Wilson
- TV announcers (ESPN+): Christian Saez and Nick Hager
- Box score, Recap

Game information
First quarter
- UNCO – Hunter Green 35-yard field goal, 3:57. Bears 3–0. Drive: 7 plays, 48 yards, 3:42.

Second quarter

- UNCO – Caden Meis 2-yard run (Hunter Green kick), 13:52. Bears 10–0. Drive: 12 plays, 62 yards, 4:42.
- ACU – Sam Hicks 17-yard pass from Maverick McIvor (Ritse Vaes kick), 1:09. Bears 10–7. Drive: 4 plays, 66 yards, 0:46.

Third quarter

- ACU – Sam Hicks 65-yard run (Ritse Vaes kick), 9:32. Wildcats 14–10. Drive: 3 plays, 80 yards, 1:05.
- ACU – Isaiah Johnson 5-yard run (Ritse Vaes kick), 1:00. Wildcats 21–10. Drive: 9 plays, 84 yards, 3:50.

Fourth quarter

- UNCO – Caden Meis 2-yard run (pass failed), 8:42. Wildcats 21–16. Drive: 16 plays, 75 yards, 7:18.
- UNCO – Hank Gibbs 3-yard run (pass failed), 1:10. Bears 22–21. Drive: 14 plays, 69 yards, 5:29.
- ACU – Ritse Vaes 54-yard field goal, 0:00. Wildcats 24–22. Drive: 9 plays, 38 yards, 1:10.

Statistics	ACU	UNCO
First downs	12	18
Total yards	325	266
Rushing yards	96	241
Passing yards	229	25
Turnovers	0	1
Time of possession	20:17	39:43

Team	Category	Player	Statistics
Abilene Christian	Passing	Maverick McIvor	20/34, 229 yards, TD
Abilene Christian	Rushing	Sam Hicks	9 rushes, 76 yards, TD
Abilene Christian	Receiving	Javon Gibson	7 receptions, 102 yards
Northern Colorado	Passing	Jonah Chong	4/8, 14 yards
Northern Colorado	Rushing	Darius Stewart	21 rushes, 132 yards
Northern Colorado	Receiving	Brayden Munroe	1 reception, 8 yards

=== No. 4 Idaho ===
No. 4 Idaho Vandals at No. 19 Abilene Christian Wildcats – Game summary

Quarter	1	2	3	4	Total
No. 4 Vandals	14	6	7	0	27
No. 19 Wildcats	0	3	8	13	24

at Wildcat Stadium, Abilene, Texas

- Date: September 21
- Game time: 7:00 p.m. CDT
- Game weather: Sunny
- Game attendance: 11,719
- TV announcers (ESPN+): Grant Boone, Bob Shipley
- Box score, Recap

Game information
First quarter
- IDHO – Jordan Dwyer 22-yard pass from Jack Wagner (Cameron Pope kick), 7:06. Vandals 7–0. Drive: 4 plays, 58 yards, 2:28.
- IDHO – Mark Hamper 44-yard pass from Jack Wagner (Cameron Pope kick), 3:00. Vandals 14–0. Drive: 7 plays, 73 yards, 2:47.

Second quarter

- ACU – Ritse Vaes 27-yard field goal, 13:01. Vandals 14–3. Drive: 12 plays, 65 yards, 4:59.
- IDHO – Cameron Pope 33-yard field goal, 4:41. Vandals 17–3. Drive: 5 plays, 44 yards, 2:17.
- IDHO – Cameron Pope 25-yard field goal, 0:15. Vandals 20–3. Drive: 13 plays, 63 yards, 2:54.

Third quarter

- IDHO – Nate Thomas 3-yard run (Cameron Pope kick), 13:04. Vandals 27–3. Drive: 4 plays, 75 yards, 1:56.
- ACU – J. J. Henry 5-yard pass from Maverick McIvor (Maverick McIvor pass to Blayne Taylor), 2:32. Vandals 27–11. Drive: 11 plays, 61 yards, 4:50.

Fourth quarter

- ACU – Nehemiah Martinez I 23-yard pass from Maverick McIvor (pass failed), 10:03. Vandals 27–17. Drive: 6 plays, 80 yards, 2:29.
- ACU – Isaiah Johnson 1-yard run (Ritse Vaes kick), 3:47. Vandals 27–24. Drive: 9 plays, 72 yards, 4:14.

Statistics	IDHO	ACU
First downs	23	25
Total yards	424	393
Rushing yards	171	105
Passing yards	253	288
Turnovers	0	3
Time of possession	30:57	29:03

Team	Category	Player	Statistics
Idaho	Passing	Jack Wagner	18/35, 253 yards, 2 TD
Idaho	Rushing	Nate Thomas	15 rushes, 64 yards, TD
Idaho	Receiving	Jordan Dwyer	5 receptions, 91 yards, TD
Abilene Christian	Passing	Maverick McIvor	26/46, 288 yards, 2 TD, 2 INT
Abilene Christian	Rushing	Isaiah Jonhson	10 rushes, 59 yards, TD
Abilene Christian	Receiving	Nehemiah Martinez I	4 receptions, 77 yards, TD

=== at Utah Tech ===
No. 20 Abilene Christian Wildcats at Utah Tech Trailblazers – Game summary

Quarter	1	2	3	4	Total
No. 20 Wildcats	14	13	14	14	55
Trailblazers	7	9	0	14	30

at Greater Zion Stadium, St. George, Utah

- Date: September 28
- Game time: 7:00 p.m. CDT/6:00 p.m. MDT
- Game weather: Sunny, 102 °F (39 °C)
- Game attendance: 5,451
- Referee: Matthew Jones
- TV announcers (ESPN+): Rod Zundel, Max Christensen III, Ronnie Walker Jr.
- Box score, Recap

Game information
First quarter
- UTU – Chris Street 7-yard run (Ilya Uvaydov kick), 9:36. Trailblazers 7–0. Drive: 7 plays, 55 yards, 2:53.
- ACU – Blayne Taylor 76-yard pass from Maverick McIvor (Ritse Vaes kick), 8:16. Tied 7–7. Drive: 4 plays, 75 yards, 1:20.
- ACU – Sam Hicks 53-yard run (Ritse Vaes kick), 2:56. Wildcats 14–7. Drive: 8 plays, 91 yards, 3:19.

Second quarter

- UTU – Ilya Uvaydov 32-yard field goal, 13:24. Wildcats 14–10. Drive: 4 plays, 4 yards, 1:22.
- ACU – Ritse Vaes 52-yard field goal, 11:06. Wildcats 17–10. Drive: 7 plays, 39 yards, 2:18.
- ACU – Ritse Vaes 25-yard field goal, 3:26. Wildcats 20–10. Drive: 5 plays, 18 yards, 1:54.
- ACU – Sam Hicks 35-yard run (Ritse Vaes kick), 0:27. Wildcats 27–10. Drive: 7 plays, 77 yards, 0:45.
- UTU – Eric Olsen 32-yard pass from Reggie Graff (kick failed), 0:09. Wildcats 27–16. Drive: 3 plays, 75 yards, 0:18.

Third quarter

- ACU – Nehemiah Martinez I 73-yard pass from Maverick McIvor (Ritse Vaes kick), 14:11. Wildcats 34–16. Drive: 2 plays, 75 yards, 0:43.
- ACU – Isaiah Johnson 9-yard run (Ritse Vaes kick), 7:21. Wildcats 41–16. Drive: 11 plays, 79 yards, 5:10.

Fourth quarter

- ACU – Sam Hicks 8-yard run (Ritse Vaes kick), 11:11. Wildcats 48–16. Drive: 4 plays, 76 yards, 2:09.
- ACU – Chris Wright 28-yard fumble return (Ritse Vaes kick), 10:57. Wildcats 55–16.
- UTU – Reggie Graff 9-yard run (Ilya Uvaydov kick), 9:02. Wildcats 55–23. Drive: 4 plays, 75 yards, 1:55.
- UTU – Bretton Stone 10-yard run (Ilya Uvaydov kick), 3:46. Wildcats 55–30. Drive: 7 plays, 70 yards, 3:07.

Statistics	ACU	UTU
First downs	22	22
Total yards	609	508
Rushing yards	323	180
Passing yards	286	328
Turnovers	1	2
Time of possession	28:48	31:12

Team	Category	Player	Statistics
Abilene Christian	Passing	Maverick McIvor	18/33, 286 yards, 2 TD
Abilene Christian	Rushing	Sam Hicks	12 rushes, 203 yards, 3 TD
Abilene Christian	Receiving	Blayne Taylor	5 receptions, 128 yards, TD
Utah Tech	Passing	Reggie Graff	13/22, 231 yards, TD
Utah Tech	Rushing	Reggie Graff	12 rushes, 79 yards, TD
Utah Tech	Receiving	Eric Olsen	3 receptions, 60 yards, TD

=== No. 5 Central Arkansas ===
No. 5 Central Arkansas Bears at No. 16 Abilene Christian Wildcats – Game summary

Quarter	1	2	3	4	Total
No. 5 Bears	7	10	7	10	34
No. 16 Wildcats	14	17	3	7	41

at Wildcat Stadium, Abilene, Texas

- Date: October 5
- Game time: 3:00 p.m. CDT
- Game weather: Sunny
- Game attendance: 7,853
- Referee: Gabe Tomlin
- TV announcers (ESPN+): Grant Boone, Bob Shipley
- Box score, Recap

Game information
First quarter
- ACU – Nehemiah Martinez I 70-yard pass from Maverick McIvor (Ritse Vaes kick), 11:27. Wildcats 7–0. Drive: 1 play, 70 yards, 0:16.
- CARK – ShunDerrick Powell 62-yard run (Jake Gaster kick), 10:40. Tied 7–7. Drive: 2 plays, 75 yards, 0:47.
- ACU – Blayne Taylor 13-yard pass from Maverick McIvor (Ritse Vaes kick), 4:20. Wildcats 14–7. Drive: 14 plays, 66 yards, 6:11.

Second quarter

- ACU – Ritse Vaes 27-yard field goal, 14:09. Wildcats 17–7. Drive: 9 plays, 67 yards, 3:02.
- CARK – ShunDerrick Powell 51-yard run (Jake Gaster kick), 13:04. Wildcats 17–14. Drive: 3 plays, 79 yards, 1:00.
- ACU – Hut Graham 9-yard pass from Maverick McIvor (Ritse Vaes kick), 8:54. Wildcats 24–14. Drive: 9 plays, 54 yards, 4:02.
- ACU – Nehemiah Martinez I 26-yard pass from Maverick McIvor (Ritse Vaes kick), 4:54. Wildcats 31–14. Drive: 8 plays, 59 yards, 2:40.
- CARK – Jake Gaster 26-yard field goal, 0:00. Wildcats 31–17. Drive: 10 plays, 64 yards, 1:40.

Third quarter

- ACU – Ritse Vaes 20-yard field goal, 5:52. Wildcats 34–17. Drive: 5 plays, 77 yards, 2:21.
- CARK – ShunDerrick Powell 11-yard pass from Will McElvain (Jake Gaster kick), 0:36. Wildcats 34–24. Drive: 11 plays, 87 yards, 5:08.

Fourth quarter

- ACU – Nehemiah Martinez I 3-yard pass from Maverick McIvor (Ritse Vaes kick), 12:52. Wildcats 41–24. Drive: 6 plays, 75 yards, 2:44.
- CARK – Jake Gaster 21-yard field goal, 7:49. Wildcats 41–27. Drive: 12 plays, 71 yards, 5:03.
- CARK – Trejan Bridges 11-yard pass from Will McElvain (Jake Gaster kick), 1:38. Wildcats 41–34. Drive: 12 plays, 90 yards, 2:51.

Statistics	UCA	ACU
First downs	31	23
Total yards	528	506
Rushing yards	202	156
Passing yards	326	350
Turnovers	2	0
Time of possession	30:17	29:43

Team	Category	Player	Statistics
Central Arkansas	Passing	Will McElvain	33/46, 326 yards, 2 TD, INT
Central Arkansas	Rushing	ShunDerrick Powell	20 rushes, 155 yards, 2 TD
Central Arkansas	Receiving	Malachi Henry	5 receptions, 83 yards
Abilene Christian	Passing	Maverick McIvor	22/36, 350 yards, 5 TD
Abilene Christian	Rushing	Isaiah Johnson	15 rushes, 91 yards
Abilene Christian	Receiving	Nehemiah Martinez I	7 receptions, 202 yards, 3 TD

=== at North Alabama ===
No. 10 Abilene Christian Wildcats at North Alabama Lions – Game summary

Quarter	1	2	3	4	Total
No. 10 Wildcats	14	13	7	0	34
Lions	20	0	13	14	47

at Braly Municipal Stadium, Florence, Alabama

- Date: October 12
- Game time: 6:00 p.m. CDT
- Game weather: Sunny, 81 °F (27 °C)
- Game attendance: 9,918
- Referee: Branden McCain
- TV announcers (ESPN+): Benjamin Ray (play-by-play) and Bryan Neece (analyst)
- Box score, Recap

Game information

First quarter

- UNA – T. J. Smith 1-yard rush (run failed), 14:15. Lions 6–0. Drive: 2 plays, 6 yards, 0:39.
- UNA – Tanaka Scott 23-yard pass from T. J. Smith (Scott Payne kick), 10:06. Lions 13–0. Drive: 3 plays, 37 yards, 1:21.
- ACU – Isaiah Johnson 60-yard rush (Ritse Vaes kick), 8:52. Lions 13–7. Drive: 4 plays, 75 yards, 1:14.
- ACU – Blayne Taylor 16-yard pass from Maverick McIvor (Ritse Vaes kick), 4:22. Wildcats 14–13. Drive: 7 plays, 52 yards, 2:58.
- UNA – T. J. Smith 46-yard rush (Scott Payne kick), 2:19. Lions 20–14. Drive: 4 plays, 85 yards, 1:58.

Second quarter

- ACU – Sam Hicks 4-yard rush (kick blocked), 7:21. Tied 20–20. Drive: 6 plays, 28 yards, 2:33.
- ACU – Sam Hicks 38-yard rush (Ritse Vaes kick), 1:39. Wildcats 27–20. Drive: 8 plays, 85 yards, 2:46.

Third quarter

- UNA – Justin Luke 23-yard pass from T. J. Smith (kick blocked), 14:09. Wildcats 27–26. Drive: 3 plays, 75 yards, 0:51.
- ACU – Isaiah Johnson 1-yard rush (Ritse Vaes kick), 12:23. Wildcats 34–26. Drive: 4 plays, 41 yards, 1:35.
- UNA – Kobe Warden 37-yard pass from T. J. Smith (Scott Payne kick), 2:07. Wildcats 34–33. Drive: 5 plays, 72 yards, 2:04.

Fourth quarter

- UNA – Jalen Fletcher 24-yard rush (Scott Payne kick), 11:36. Lions 40–34. Drive: 8 plays, 88 yards, 3:27.
- UNA – Kobe Warden 8-yard pass from T. J. Smith (Scott Payne kick), 1:51. Lions 47–34. Drive: 9 plays, 94 yards, 4:53.

Statistics	ACU	UNA
First downs	26	22
Total yards	468	506
Rushing yards	193	286
Passing yards	275	220
Turnovers	2	1
Time of possession	31:38	28:22

Team	Category	Player	Statistics
Abilene Christian	Passing	Maverick McIvor	30/48, 275 yards, TD, INT
Abilene Christian	Rushing	Sam Hicks	13 rushes, 99 yards, 2 TD
Abilene Christian	Receiving	Nehemiah Martinez I	13 receptions, 93 yards
North Alabama	Passing	T. J. Smith	17/24, 220 yards, 4 TD, INT
North Alabama	Rushing	Jalen Fletcher	10 rushes, 123 yards, TD
North Alabama	Receiving	Kobe Warden	9 receptions, 112 yards, 2 TD

=== Eastern Kentucky ===
Eastern Kentucky Colonels at No. 17 Abilene Christian Wildcats – Game summary

Quarter	1	2	3	4	Total
Colonels	0	7	13	0	20
No. 17 Wildcats	0	14	14	6	34

at Wildcat Stadium, Abilene, Texas

- Date: October 19
- Game time: 3:00 p.m. CDT
- Game weather: Sunny
- Game attendance: 10,411
- Referee: Zach Erdman
- TV announcers (ESPN+): Grant Boone, Bob Shipley
- Box score, Recap

Game information
First quarter
- No scoring plays.

Second quarter

- ACU – Sam Hicks 8-yard run (Ritse Vaes kick), 14:55. Abilene Christian 7–0. Drive: 11 plays, 87 yards, 4:14.
- ACU – Jed Castles 18-yard pass from Maverick McIvor (Ritse Vaes kick), 8:44. Abilene Christian 14–0. Drive: 8 plays, 80 yards, 3:41.
- EKU – Marcus Calwise Jr. 8-yard pass from Matt Morrissey (Patrick Nations kick), 0:29. Abilene Christian 14–7. Drive: 10 plays, 58 yards, 5:55.

Third quarter

- ACU – Blayne Taylor 45-yard pass from Maverick McIvor (Ritse Vaes kick), 13:22. Abilene Christian 21–7. Drive: 4 plays, 75 yards, 1:38.
- EKU – Dequan Stanley 75-yard pass from Matt Morrissey (Patrick Nations kick), 13:12. Abilene Christian 21–14. Drive: 1 play, 75 yards, 0:10.
- EKU – Joshua Carter 3-yard run, 5:17. Abilene Christian 21–20. Drive: 12 plays, 78 yards, 6:28.
- ACU – Blayne Taylor 11-yard pass from Maverick McIvor (Ritse Vaes kick), 1:27. Abilene Christian 28–20. Drive: 10 plays, 75 yards, 3:50.

Fourth quarter

- ACU – Ritse Vaes 21-yard field goal, 12:55. Abilene Christian 31–20. Drive: 7 plays, 16 yards, 2:41.
- ACU – Ritse Vaes 35-yard field goal, 2:17. Abilene Christian 34–20. Drive: 11 plays, 78 yards, 6:07.

Statistics	EKU	ACU
First downs	19	27
Total yards	357	552
Rushing yards	92	212
Passing yards	265	340
Turnovers	3	2
Time of possession	29:24	30:36

Team	Category	Player	Statistics
Eastern Kentucky	Passing	Matt Morrissey	20/33, 265 yards, 2 TD, 3 INT
Eastern Kentucky	Rushing	Joshua Carter	16 rushes, 79 yards, TD
Eastern Kentucky	Receiving	Dequan Stanley	5 receptions, 116 yards, TD
Abilene Christian	Passing	Maverick McIvor	24/37, 340 yards, 3 TD, INT
Abilene Christian	Rushing	Sam Hicks	24 rushes, 146 yards, TD
Abilene Christian	Receiving	Blayne Taylor	10 receptions, 154 yards, 2 TD

=== Southern Utah ===
Southern Utah Thunderbirds at No. 17 Abilene Christian Wildcats – Game summary

Quarter	1	2	3	4	Total
Thunderbirds	0	3	7	15	25
No. 17 Wildcats	14	7	0	7	28

at Wildcat Stadium, Abilene, Texas

- Date: November 2
- Game time: 3:00 p.m. CDT
- Game weather: Cloudy, 78 °F (26 °C)
- Game attendance: 9,701
- Referee: Matthew Jones
- TV announcers (ESPN+): Grant Boone, Bob Shipley
- Box score, Recap

Game information

First quarter

- (10:03) ACU – Javon Gipson 13-yard pass from Maverick McIvor, Ritse Vaes kick (Drive: 8 plays, 61 yards, 3:33; Abilene Christian 7–0)
- (2:05) ACU – Isaiah Johnson 6-yard run, Ritse Vaes kick (Drive: 12 plays, 81 yards, 4:44; Abilene Christian 14–0)

Second quarter

- (10:22) ACU – Isaiah Johnson 1-yard run, Ritse Vaes kick (Drive: 9 plays, 71 yards, 4:38; Abilene Christian 21–0)
- (0:27) SUU – Jayden Rogers 42-yard field goal (Drive: 11 plays, 56 yards, 2:57; Abilene Christian 21–3)

Third quarter

- (1:22) SUU – Targhee Lambson 3-yard run, Jayden Rogers kick (Drive: 4 plays, 78 yards, 1:55; Abilene Christian 21–10)

Fourth quarter

- (9:54) ACU – Sam Hicks 12-yard pass from Maverick McIvor, Ritse Vaes kick (Drive: 12 plays, 88 yards, 6:28; Abilene Christian 28–10)
- (5:56) SUU – Targhee Lambson 13-yard run, Jayden Rogers kick (Drive: 11 plays, 75 yards, 3:58; Abilene Christian 28–17)
- (4:03) SUU – Targhee Lambson 1-yard run, Jayden Rogers kick (Drive: 1 play, 1 yard, 0:04; Abilene Christian 28–25)

Statistics	SUU	ACU
First downs	17	26
Total yards	296	445
Rushing yards	220	139
Passing yards	76	306
Turnovers	1	1
Time of possession	25:02	34:58

Team	Category	Player	Statistics
Southern Utah	Passing	Jackson Berry	12/19, 76 yards
Southern Utah	Rushing	Targhee Lambson	27 carries, 198 yards, 3 TD
Southern Utah	Receiving	Devin Downing	2 receptions, 21 yards
Abilene Christian	Passing	Maverick McIvor	22/31, 306 yards, 2 TD, INT
Abilene Christian	Rushing	Isaiah Johnson	19 carries, 72 yards, 2 TD
Abilene Christian	Receiving	Blayne Taylor	5 receptions, 81 yards

=== at Austin Peay ===
No. 15 Abilene Christian Wildcats at Austin Peay Governors – Game summary

Quarter	1	2	3	4	Total
No. 15 Wildcats	14	0	14	7	35
Governors	14	13	0	7	34

at Fortera Stadium, Clarksville, Tennessee

- Date: November 9
- Game time: 3:00 p.m. CST
- Game weather: Rain, 59 °F (15 °C)
- Game attendance: 3,741
- Referee: Jeremee Tate
- TV announcers (ESPN+): Alex Gould, Ethan Schmidt
- Box score, Recap

Game information

First quarter

- (12:35) APSU – Jaden Barnes 58-yard pass from Austin Smith, Carson Smith kick (Drive: 3 plays, 69 yards, 0:55; Austin Peay 7–0)
- (9:58) ACU – J. J. Henry 66-yard pass from Maverick McIvor, Ritse Vaes kick (Drive: 5 plays, 80 yards, 2:31; Tied 7–7)
- (6:39) APSU – La'Vell Wright 2-yard run, Carson Smith kick (Drive: 7 plays, 71 yards, 3:13; Austin Peay 14–7)
- (3:52) ACU – J. J. Henry 44-yard pass from Maverick McIvor, Ritse Vaes kick (Drive: 6 plays, 79 yards, 2:42; Tied 14–14)

Second quarter

- (10:38) APSU – Carson Smith 29-yard field goal (Drive: 15 plays, 52 yards, 8:06; Austin Peay 17–14)
- (8:24) APSU – Jaden Barnes 73-yard pass from Austin Smith, Carson Smith kick (Drive: 1 play, 73 yards, 0:11; Austin Peay 24–14)
- (0:16) APSU – Carson Smith 33-yard field goal (Drive: 15 plays, 50 yards, 4:59; Austin Peay 27–14)

Third quarter

- (6:23) ACU – Sam Hicks 14-yard run, Ritse Vaes kick (Drive: 9 plays, 56 yards, 5:12; Austin Peay 27–21)
- (0:55) ACU – Sam Hicks 15-yard run, Ritse Vaes kick (Drive: 8 plays, 72 yards, 3:25; Abilene Christian 28–27)

Fourth quarter

- (11:54) APSU – Austin Smith 1-yard run, Carson Smith kick (Drive: 7 plays, 68 yards, 3:53; Austin Peay 34–28)
- (3:07) ACU – Jed Castles 15-yard pass from Maverick McIvor, Ritse Vaes kick (Drive: 10 plays, 74 yards, 3:12; Abilene Christian 35–34)

Statistics	ACU	APSU
First downs	26	17
Total yards	526	415
Rushing yards	171	107
Passing yards	355	308
Turnovers	1	0
Time of possession	30:58	29:02

Team	Category	Player	Statistics
Abilene Christian	Passing	Maverick McIvor	25/42, 355 yards, 3 TD
Abilene Christian	Rushing	Sam Hicks	16 rushes, 113 yards, 2 TD
Abilene Christian	Receiving	J. J. Henry	3 receptions, 125 yards, 2 TD
Austin Peay	Passing	Austin Smith	18/32, 308 yards, 2 TD
Austin Peay	Rushing	La'Vell Wright	17 rushes, 66 yards, TD
Austin Peay	Receiving	Jaden Barnes	6 receptions, 179 yards, 2 TD

=== at No. 13 Tarleton State ===
No. 14 Abilene Christian Wildcats at No. 13 Tarleton State Texans – Game summary

Quarter	1	2	3	4	Total
No. 14 Wildcats	10	7	3	15	35
No. 13 Texans	14	0	7	10	31

at Memorial Stadium, Stephenville, Texas

- Date: November 16
- Game time: 6:00 p.m. CST
- Game weather: Sunny, 75 °F (24 °C)
- Game attendance: 22,348
- Referee: John Kellermeier
- TV announcers (ESPN+): Alex Gould (play-by-play) and Ethan Schmidt (analyst)
- Box score, Recap

Game information

First quarter

- (10:52) ACU – Nehemiah Martinez I 5-yard pass from Maverick McIvor, Ritse Vaes kick (Drive: 9 plays, 75 yards, 4:08; Abilene Christian 7–0)
- (8:50) TAR – Cody Jackson 58-yard pass from Victor Gabalis, Corbin Poston kick (Drive: 4 plays, 85 yards, 1:59; Tied 7–7)
- (0:21) ACU – Ritse Vaes 32-yard field goal (Drive: 15 plays, 60 yards, 8:29; Abilene Christian 10–7)
- (0:09) TAR – Darius Cooper 75-yard pass from Victor Gabalis, Corbin Poston kick (Drive: 1 play, 75 yards, 0:12; Tarleton State 14–10)

Second quarter

- (12:17) ACU – Javon Gipson 29-yard pass from Maverick McIvor, Ritse Vaes kick (Drive: 7 plays, 75 yards, 2:52; Abilene Christian 17–14)

Third quarter

- (13:25) TAR – Darius Cooper 22-yard pass from Victor Gabalis, Corbin Poston kick (Drive: 4 plays, 75 yards, 1:35; Tarleton State 21–17)
- (1:23) ACU – Ritse Vaes 27-yard field goal (Drive: 14 plays, 87 yards, 7:14; Tarleton State 21–20)

Fourth quarter

- (12:27) TAR – Braelon Bridges 1-yard run, Corbin Poston kick (Drive: 8 plays, 83 yards, 3:51; Tarleton State 28–20)
- (9:25) ACU – Sam Hicks 12-yard run, Blayne Taylor pass (Drive: 7 plays, 77 yards, 2:56; Tied 28–28)
- (1:48) TAR – Corbin Poston 25-yard field goal (Drive: 14 plays, 58 yards, 7:37; Tarleton State 31–28)
- (0:19) ACU – Sam Hicks 1-yard pass from Maverick McIvor, Ritse Vaes kick (Drive: 12 plays, 75 yards, 1:29; Abilene Christian 35–31)

Statistics	ACU	TAR
First downs	31	20
Total yards	544	486
Rushing yards	153	182
Passing yards	391	304
Turnovers	0	0
Time of possession	35:54	24:06

Team	Category	Player	Statistics
Abilene Christian	Passing	Maverick McIvor	35/55, 391 yards, 3 TD
Abilene Christian	Rushing	Sam Hicks	22 carries, 135 yards, TD
Abilene Christian	Receiving	Blayne Taylor	10 receptions, 168 yards
Tarleton State	Passing	Victor Gabalis	15/20, 304 yards, 3 TD
Tarleton State	Rushing	Kayvon Britten	22 carries, 101 yards
Tarleton State	Receiving	Darius Cooper	6 receptions, 141 yards, 2 TD

=== at Stephen F. Austin ===
No. 11 Abilene Christian Wildcats at Stephen F. Austin Lumberjacks – Game summary

Quarter	1	2	3	4	Total
No. 11 Wildcats	0	6	7	6	19
Lumberjacks	9	7	16	0	32

at Homer Bryce Stadium, Nacogdoches, Texas

- Date: November 23
- Game time: 2:00 p.m. CST
- Game weather: Sunny
- Referee: James Bookhart
- TV announcers (ESPN+): Chris Simmons, Courtnee Garcia
- Box score, Recap

Game information
First quarter
- SFA – Lavar Lindo 8-yard pass from Gavin Rutherford (Chris Campos kick), 10:05. Lumberjacks 7–0. Drive: 3 plays, 12 yards, 0:43.
- SFA – Team safety, 0:16. Lumberjacks 9–0.

Second quarter

- SFA – Kylon Harris 60-yard pass from Gavin Rutherford (Chris Campos kick), 11:04. Lumberjacks 16–0. Drive: 3 plays, 63 yards, 0:50.
- ACU – Jed Castles 9-yard pass from Maverick McIvor (pass failed), 4:42. Lumberjacks 16–6. Drive: 8 plays, 34 yards, 3:19.

Third quarter

- SFA – Chris Campos 30-yard field goal, 13:52. Lumberjacks 19–6. Drive: 4 plays, 1 yard, 0:58.
- SFA – Qualan Jones 10-yard run (pass failed), 10:31. Lumberjacks 25–6. Drive: 3 plays, 90 yards, 0:41.
- SFA – Qualan Jones 1-yard run (Chris Campos kick), 5:06. Lumberjacks 32–6. Drive: 8 plays, 65 yards, 4:02.
- ACU – Nehemiah Martinez I 74-yard pass from Carson Haggard (Ritse Vaes kick), 4:17. Lumberjacks 32–13. Drive: 3 plays, 75 yards, 0:49.

Fourth quarter

- ACU – Blayne Taylor 18-yard pass from Carson Haggard (pass failed), 9:53. Lumberjacks 32–19. Drive: 7 plays, 63 yards, 2:21.

Statistics	ACU	SFA
First downs	17	18
Total yards	293	384
Rushing yards	35	124
Passing yards	258	260
Turnovers	3	1
Time of possession	26:33	33:27

Team	Category	Player	Statistics
Abilene Christian	Passing	Carson Haggard	12/30, 187 yards, 2 TD, 2 INT
Abilene Christian	Rushing	Isaiah Johnson	5 rushes, 30 yards
Abilene Christian	Receiving	Nehemiah Martinez I	6 receptions, 127 yards, TD
Stephen F. Austin	Passing	Gavin Rutherford	17/30, 260 yards, 2 TD
Stephen F. Austin	Rushing	Qualan Jones	17 rushes, 62 yards, 2 TD
Stephen F. Austin	Receiving	Jordan Nabors	3 receptions, 104 yards

=== No. 17 Northern Arizona (NCAA Division I First Round) ===
No. 17 Northern Arizona Lumberjacks at No. 15 Abilene Christian Wildcats – Game summary

Quarter	1	2	3	4	Total
No. 17 Lumberjacks	0	0	0	0	0
No. 15 Wildcats	7	3	0	14	24

at Wildcat Stadium, Abilene, Texas

- Date: November 30
- Game time: 2:00 p.m. CST
- Game weather: Sunny, 62 °F (17 °C)
- Game attendance: 5,210
- Referee: Jeremy DeAngelo
- TV announcers (ESPN+): Ted Emrich (play-by-play) and Taylor McHargue (analyst)
- Box score, Recap

Game information
First quarter
- ACU – Trey Cleveland 37-yard pass from Carson Haggard (Ritse Vaes kick), 3:18. Wildcats 7–0. Drive: 10 plays, 97 yards, 4:36.

Second quarter

- ACU – Ritse Vaes 46-yard field goal, 3:17. Wildcats 10–0. Drive: 10 plays, 66 yards, 6:13.

Third quarter

- No scoring plays

Fourth quarter

- ACU – Sam Hicks 53-yard run (Ritse Vaes kick), 10:16. Wildcats 17–0. Drive: 1 play, 53 yards, 0:10.
- ACU – Blayne Taylor 6-yard pass from Carson Haggard (Ritse Vaes kick), 2:16. Wildcats 24–0. Drive: 11 plays, 67 yards, 5:41.

Statistics	NAU	ACU
First downs	11	18
Total yards	194	474
Rushing yards	29	230
Passing yards	165	244
Turnovers	1	3
Time of possession	26:25	33:35

Team	Category	Player	Statistics
Northern Arizona	Passing	Ty Pennington	16/31, 165 yards, INT
Northern Arizona	Rushing	Seth Cromwell	8 rushes, 19 yards
Northern Arizona	Receiving	Tay Lanier	1 reception, 36 yards
Abilene Christian	Passing	Carson Haggard	23/29, 244 yards, 2 TD, 3 INT
Abilene Christian	Rushing	Sam Hicks	22 rushes, 171 yards, TD
Abilene Christian	Receiving	Blayne Taylor	5 receptions, 89 yards, TD

=== at No. 3 North Dakota State (NCAA Division I Second Round) ===
No. 15 Abilene Christian Wildcats at No. 3 North Dakota Bison – Game summary

Quarter	1	2	3	4	Total
No. 15 Wildcats	14	3	7	7	31
No. 3 Bison	3	17	21	10	51

at Fargodome, Fargo, North Dakota

- Date: December 7
- Game time: 2:00 p.m. CST
- Game weather: None (played indoors)
- Game attendance: 10,373
- Referee: Matt Overton
- TV announcers (ESPN+): Noah Reed and Craig Haubert
- Box score, Recap

Game information
First quarter
- NDSU – Griffin Crosa 21-yard field goal, 8:52. Bison 3–0. Drive: 12 plays, 72 yards, 6:08.
- ACU – J. J. Henry 13-yard pass from Maverick McIvor (Ritse Vaes kick), 2:45. Wildcats 7–3. Drive: 12 plays, 75 yards, 6:07.
- ACU – Sam Hicks 90-yard run (Ritse Vaes kick), 0:00. Wildcats 14–3. Drive: 1 play, 90 yards, 0:04.

Second quarter

- ACU – Ritse Vaes 29-yard field goal, 10:35. Wildcats 17–3. Drive: 4 plays, 1 yard, 0:57.
- NDSU – Jackson Williams 100-yard kickoff return (Griffin Crosa kick), 10:24. Wildcats 17–10.
- NDSU – Griffin Crosa 37-yard field goal, 5:58. 'Wildcats 17–13. Drive: 6 plays, 25 yards, 2:18.
- NDSU – RaJa Nelson 6-yard pass from Cam Miller (Griffin Crosa kick), 0:21. Bison 20–17. Drive: 9 plays, 66 yards, 2:28.

Third quarter

- NDSU – Cam Miller 1-yard run (Griffin Crosa kick), 10:38. Bison 27–17. Drive: 4 plays, 28 yards, 1:47.
- NDSU – T. K. Marshall 30-yard pass from Cam Miller (Griffin Crosa kick), 6:08. Bison 34–17. Drive: 4 plays, 60 yards, 2:15.
- ACU – Sam Hicks 3-yard run (Ritse Vaes kick), 3:23. Bison 34–24. Drive: 5 plays, 39 yards, 2:35.
- NDSU – Bryce Lance 36-yard pass from Cam Miller (Griffin Crosa kick), 0:40. Bison 41–24. Drive: 5 plays, 75 yards, 2:43.

Fourth quarter

- ACU – Rovaughn Banks Jr. 2-yard run (Ritse Vaes kick), 11:11. Bison 41–31. Drive: 10 plays, 75 yards, 4:29.
- NDSU – Griffin Crosa 24-yard field goal, 3:34. Bison 44–31. Drive: 4 plays, 3 yards, 1:42.
- NDSU – Logan Kopp 31-yard interception return (Griffin Crosa kick), 3:25. Bison 51–31.

Statistics	ACU	NDSU
First downs	16	19
Total yards	345	375
Rushing yards	192	101
Passing yards	153	274
Turnovers	3	1
Time of possession	29:28	30:32

Team	Category	Player	Statistics
Abilene Christian	Passing	Maverick McIvor	20/32, 153 yards, TD, 2 INT
Abilene Christian	Rushing	Sam Hicks	16 rushes, 153 yards, 2 TD
Abilene Christian	Receiving	J. J. Henry	7 receptions, 70 yards, TD
North Dakota State	Passing	Cam Miller	20/29, 274 yards, 3 TD, INT
North Dakota State	Rushing	CharMar Brown	16 rushes, 58 yards
North Dakota State	Receiving	Bryce Lance	5 receptions, 70 yards, TD
