= Pawelek =

Pawelek or Pawełek is a surname. Notable people with the surname include:

- Joe Pawelek (born 1986), American football linebacker
- Kazimierz Pawełek (1936–2017), Polish journalist and politician
- Kim Pawelek Brantly (born 1974), Vietnamese-American middle- and long-distance runner
- Mariusz Pawełek (born 1981), Polish footballer
- Mark Pawelek (born 1986), American baseball player
- Ted Pawelek (1919–1964), American baseball player

== See also ==
- Pawelekville, an unincorporated community in Texas, United States
