= Karnes, Texas =

Karnes, Texas, may refer to:

- Karnes City, Texas
- Karnes County, Texas
