= Panna Maria =

Panna Maria may refer to:

- Mary (mother of Jesus) (Polish, Czech, and Slovak; literally: Virgin Mary)
- Panna Maria, Texas
