= Falls City High School (Texas) =

Coordinates: 28.9807°N 98.0247°W

Location
- 525 N Nelson St. Falls City, Texas 78113-0399; United States

Information
- School type: Public high school
- School district: Falls City Independent School District
- Principal: Beth DeLeon
- Teaching staff: 19.16 (FTE)
- Grades: 9-12
- Enrollment: 187 (2023–2024)
- Student to teacher ratio: 9.76
- Colors: Royal Blue & White
- Athletics conference: UIL Class 2A
- Mascot: Beaver/Beaverette
- Website: Falls City High School

Falls City High School is a public high school located in Falls City, Texas (USA) and classified as a 2A school by the UIL. It is part of the Falls City Independent School District located in northwest Karnes County. In 2015, the school was rated "Met Standard" by the Texas Education Agency.

== Athletics ==
The Falls City Beavers compete in these sports -

Cross Country, Football, Cheer, Marching Band, Basketball, Golf, Track, Softball & Baseball

=== State titles ===
- Football -
  - 2010(1A/D2)
- Girls Track -
  - 1982(1A), 1984(1A)

==== State finalist ====
- Baseball -
  - 1980(1A)
- Football -
  - 2013(1A/D2), 2021 (2A/D2)
