= National Register of Historic Places listings in Karnes County, Texas =

Location of Karnes County in Texas

This is a list of the National Register of Historic Places listings in Karnes County, Texas.

This is intended to be a complete list of properties and districts listed on the National Register of Historic Places in Karnes County, Texas. There are one district and two individual properties listed on the National Register in the county. One individually listed property is also a State Antiquities Landmark while the district contains several Recorded Texas Historic Landmarks.

This National Park Service list is complete through NPS recent listings posted March 21, 2025.

== Current listings ==
The locations of National Register properties and districts may be seen in a mapping service provided.

	Name on the Register	Image	Date listed	Location	City or town	Description
1	Karnes County Courthouse	Karnes County Courthouse	July 26, 2010 (#10000499)	101 Panna Maria Ave. 28°53′07″N 97°54′06″W	Karnes City	State Antiquities Landmark
2	Panna Maria Historic District	Panna Maria Historic District	May 13, 1976 (#76002043)	FM 81 off TX 123; 28°57′26″N 97°53′53″W	Panna Maria	Includes Recorded Texas Historic Landmarks; oldest Polish settlement in the USA; founded in 1854.
3	John Ruckman House	John Ruckman House	June 19, 1979 (#79002987)	6 mi (9.7 km). N of Karnes City off TX 80; 28°56′50″N 97°49′15″W	Karnes City	A provincial interpretation of the Greek Revival style built in 1878.

== See also ==
- National Register of Historic Places listings in Texas
- Recorded Texas Historic Landmarks in Karnes County
