= Mike Gisler =

American football player (born 1969)

No. 67
- Positions: Guard, center

Personal information
- Born: August 26, 1969 (age 57); Runge, Texas, U.S.
- Listed height: 6 ft 4 in (1.93 m)
- Listed weight: 300 lb (136 kg)

Career information
- High school: Runge
- College: Houston
- NFL draft: 1992: 11th round, 303rd overall pick

Career history
- New Orleans Saints (1992)*; Houston Oilers (1992)*; New England Patriots (1993–1997); New York Jets (1998–1999)
- * Offseason or practice squad member only

Awards and highlights
- 2× Second-team All-SWC (1989, 1991)

Career NFL statistics
- Games played: 105
- Games started: 7
- Stats at Pro Football Reference

Michael Gisler (born August 26, 1969) is an American former professional football player who was an offensive lineman in the National Football League (NFL). Gisler played college football for the Houston Cougars and was selected by the New Orleans Saints in the 11th round of the 1992 NFL draft. He played seven seasons in the NFL for the New England Patriots and New York Jets.
