= Karnes County Immigration Processing Center =

Immigration detention center in Texas, US

- Location in Texas
- Location: Karnes City, Texas; 28.884°N 97.915°W
- Status: Operational
- Security class: Dedicated Migrant Detention Center
- Population: 1199 (FY 2026 (YTD))
- Opened: FY 2022
- Former name: Karnes County Residential Center, Karnes County Civil Detention Center
- Managed by: GEO Group

The Karnes County Immigration Processing Center is a privately operated detention facility located in Karnes City, Texas, run by the GEO Group to house detainees for the U.S. Immigration and Customs Enforcement (ICE). It has variously housed adult men, adult women and immigrant families at different times since its opening in 2012.

== Design ==
The privately operated center is run by the GEO Group, which also constructed it in from 2011 to 2012. The facility opened in 2012 as the Karnes County Civil Detention Center. It operates as a public-private partnership involving the Karnes County government, ICE and the GEO Group.

The facility was designed as part of an Obama administration reform initiative to make detention facilities less like jails. This led to design choices including brighter colors, relaxed uniforms for guards, who were given the title of "residential advisers," recreational sports facilities, and on-site courtrooms for remote immigration court hearings. While ICE leadership pledged the facility would be fundamentally different from prison, the ACLU opposed allowing a private prison corporation to run the facility.

== History ==
On July 11, 2014, the Karnes County facility was re-designated a family detention center in response to an influx of migrant families to the US border. It was renamed the Karnes Residential Center. Family units composed of women and their children began arriving in August 2014. In December 2014, the number of beds at the facility was increased from 532 to 1,158. During this period, family stays in immigration detention were frequently longer than one month, and sometimes over a year. More than half of detained children were under seven years old, and many were breastfeeding infants.

An American Bar Association report described the detention practices: "The facility is a secure lockdown detention center run with a rigid schedule, including set meal times, wake-up and lights-out times, and multiple body counts and room checks during the day and night. The facility is not licensed for the care of children, and the guards are not trained to address either the needs of mothers and children seeking asylum or trauma survivors." It concluded that "residents of these facilities live in prison-like conditions."

In March 2019, ICE moved to repurpose the Karnes County facility again, this time to primarily hold adult women; its family detention population was reduced from 563 people in early March to 25 people in April. The Biden administration ended family detention in 2021.

In March 2025, ICE and the GEO Group agreed to make the Karnes facility into a family detention center again as part of toughened immigration policies under the second Trump administration. As of March 2025, the facility has a capacity of 1,328 beds, and held an average of 1,199 immigrants per night from October 2025 to March 2026.
