= Cestohowa, Texas =

Cestohowa
- Unincorporated community
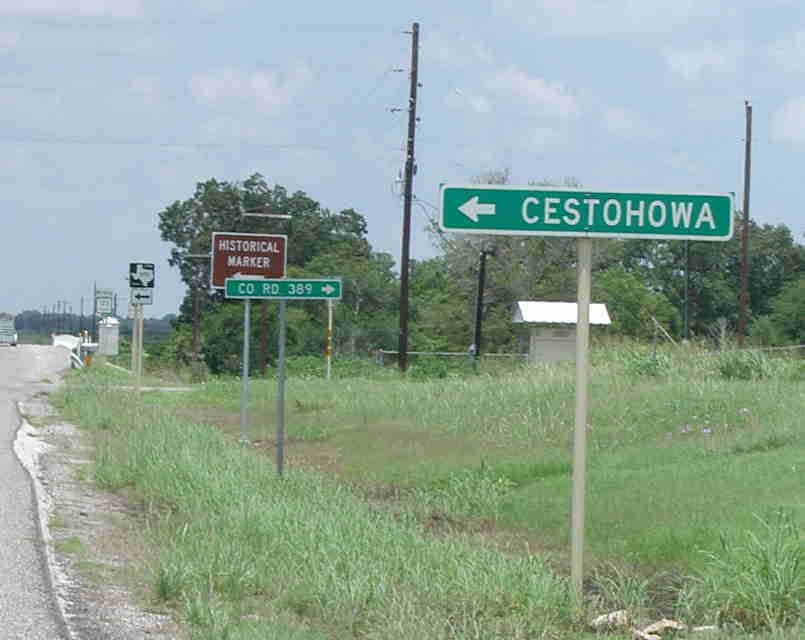
- Sign at boundary of Cestohowa

- Location in Texas and the United States Cestohowa (the United States)
- Coordinates: 29°00′26″N 97°56′05″W
- Country: United States
- State: Texas
- County: Karnes

Population (2000)
  - Total: 110
- Time zone: UTC-6 (Central (CST))
  - Summer (DST): UTC-5 (CDT)
- ZIP codes: 78113

Cestohowa is an unincorporated community in Karnes County, Texas, United States. In 2000 it had a population of 110.

== Geography ==
Cestohowa is located at 29°00′36″N 97°56′05″W (29.0099721, -97.9347253). It is situated along FM 3191, one mile west of State Highway 123 in northern Karnes County, approximately five miles north of Panna Maria and 50 miles southeast of San Antonio.

== History ==
The Spanish built a fort, the Presidio Fuerte de Santa Cruz del Cibolo near Cestohowa, founded in 1734.

The community's history is closely tied to the settlement of Panna Maria, five miles to the south. It was from Panna Maria, the oldest Polish settlement in the United States, that forty Silesian families established Cestohowa in 1873. The new settlement's name originated from the city of Częstochowa, Poland that was home to the painting of Our Lady of Częstochowa, a Roman Catholic patroness.

A church was built in 1877–78. Cestohowa had its own post office between 1883 and 1918, and a public school that opened (by incorporating a parochial school) in 1937 and operated through the 1970s. Today there are approximately 110 residents living in the community.

== Education ==
Public education in the community of Cestohowa is provided by the Falls City Independent School District.
