= Karnes City Independent School District =

School district in Texas, United States

Karnes City Independent School District KCISD
- 404 North Texas State Highway 123; Karnes City, Texas 78118 Karnes & Atascosa counties

District information
- Type: Public
- Grades: K-12
- Established: 1894; 132 years ago
- Superintendent: Jamie Robinson

Students and staff
- Colors: Orange & white

Other information
- Website: www.kcisd.net

Karnes City Independent School District is a public school district based in Karnes City, Texas (USA).

Located in Karnes County, a small portion of the district extends into Atascosa County.

In 2009, the school district was rated "recognized" by the Texas Education Agency.

== Schools ==
- Karnes City High (Grades 9–12)
- Karnes City Junior High (Grades 6–8)
- Karnes City Elementary (Grades 2-5)
- Karnes City Primary (Grades PreK-1)
