= Claude Davenport =

American baseball player (1898–1976)

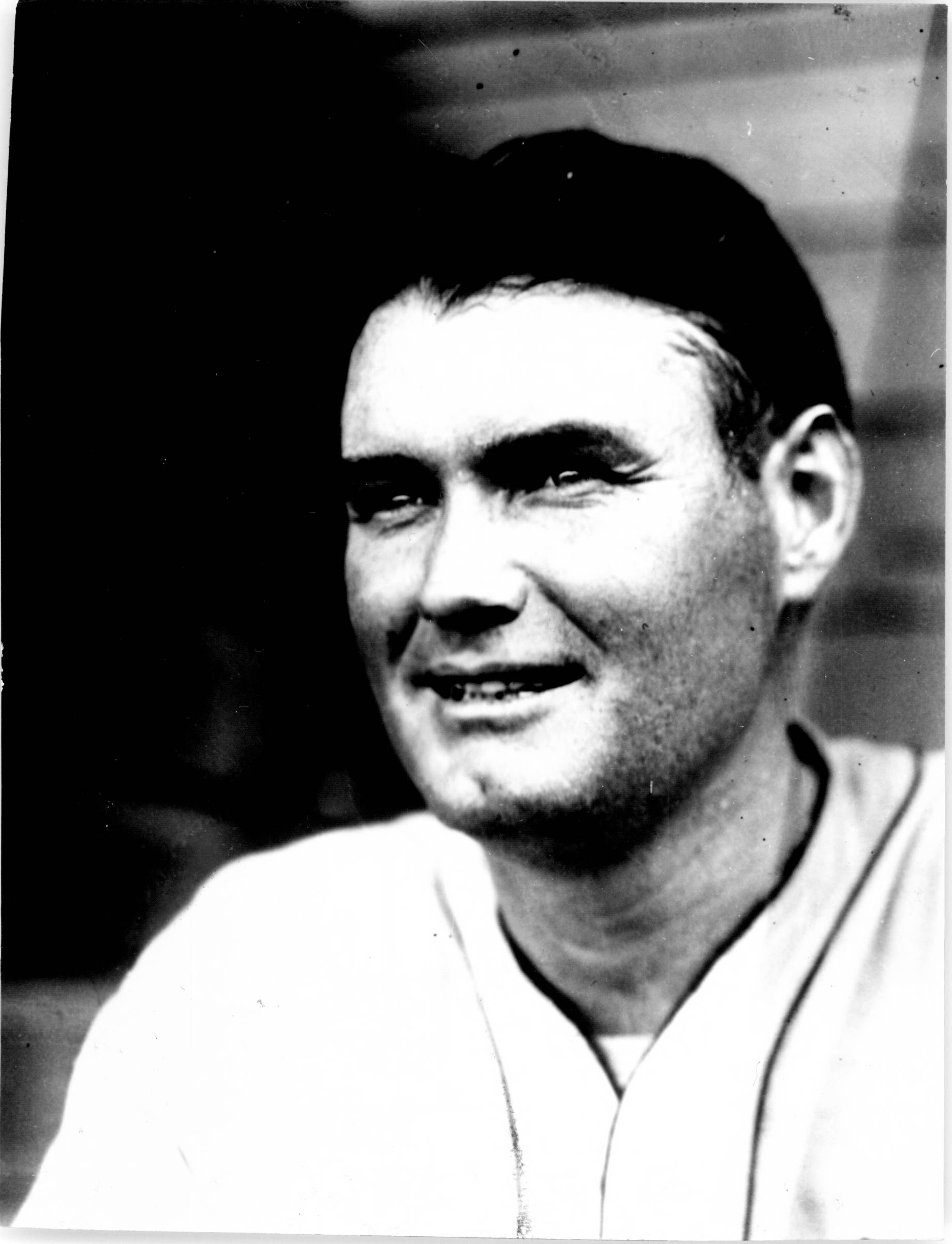
- Pitcher
- Born: May 28, 1898; Runge, Texas, U.S.
- Died: June 13, 1976 (aged 78); Corpus Christi, Texas, U.S.
- Batted: Right Threw: Right

MLB debut
- October 2, 1920, for the New York Giants

Last MLB appearance
- October 2, 1920, for the New York Giants

MLB statistics
- Win–loss record: 0-0
- Earned run average: 4.50
- Strikeouts: 0
- Stats at Baseball Reference

Teams
- New York Giants (1920)

Claude Edwin Davenport (May 28, 1898 – June 13, 1976), nicknamed "Big Dave", was an American Major League Baseball pitcher who played in 1920 with the New York Giants. He batted and threw right-handed.

He was born in Runge, Texas, and died in Corpus Christi, Texas.

He was the brother of former major leaguer Dave Davenport.
