= Falls City Independent School District =

School district in Texas, United States

Falls City Independent School District is a public school district based in Falls City, Texas (USA).

In addition to Falls City, the district also serves the unincorporated community of Hobson as well as rural areas in northwestern Karnes County and a small portion of southeastern Wilson County.

The district has two campuses:

- Falls City High School (grades 7–12)
- Falls City/Luther Thomas Elementary (grades K-6)

In 2009, the school district was rated "exemplary" by the Texas Education Agency.
