= Choate, Texas =

Unincorporated community in Karnes County, Texas

Coordinates: 28°45′53″N 97°44′35″W

Choate, Texas is an unincorporated community in Karnes County, Texas, approximately 7 miles from Kenedy. The community sprang up along the road between Kenedy and Goliad and was mostly settled by people from Oklahoma. A post office operated at Choate from 1902 to 1909. Roughly 75 people lived at Choate in the 1930s, but the population decreased as a result of a drought in the 1950s. The local school closed the following decade, and Choate had a population of 20 in 2000.
