= Alfred Irving (former slave) =

African-American freed in 1942

- Born: February 28, 1895
- Died: March 26, 1960 (aged 65)
- Known for: Being slave in the US

Alfred Irving (February 28, 1895 – March 26, 1960) was an American man freed from slavery in the United States.

== Early life ==
Alfred Irving was born in Columbus, Texas on February 28, 1895, to Solomon Irving and Susie Ann Countee, the 8th of 10 children. Irving likely never learned to read or write. Between 1917 and 1923 he moved to Karnes City, Texas.

== Background ==
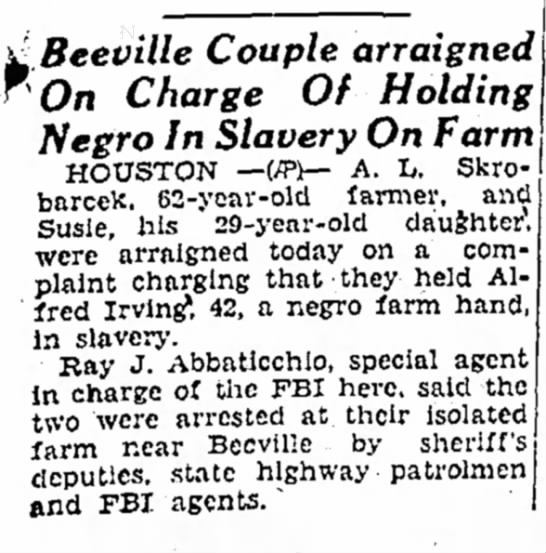

Alex Skrobarcek and his daughter, Susie, were indicted in Laredo, Texas, on October 2, 1942, for holding Irving in slavery for five years. The pair were arrested at their secluded farm by representatives of the sheriff's office, the traffic police, and the FBI. The filed police report stated that the Skrobarceks kept Irving shackled in inhumane conditions and that they repeatedly physically abused him to the point of permanent physical disfigurement.

== Verdict ==
The Skrobarcek family pleaded not guilty. They were found guilty of violating 18 USC 77 §, peonage, slavery, and trafficking in persons by a grand jury on March 18, 1943, in Corpus Christi, Texas.

== Post-emancipation ==
Alfred Irving moved back to Karnes City after he was freed; by 1950 he was living with his brother Elmo Irving. On March 26, 1960 Irving died of colon cancer. Three days later he was buried in Karnes City Cemetery.

== Personal ==
Alfred Irving married Annie Bell Johnson, they had three children, Charlie (1923), Pearlie (1925), and Sam (1927). By the time Irving was enslaved he was widowed.
