= Runge, Texas =

- Town
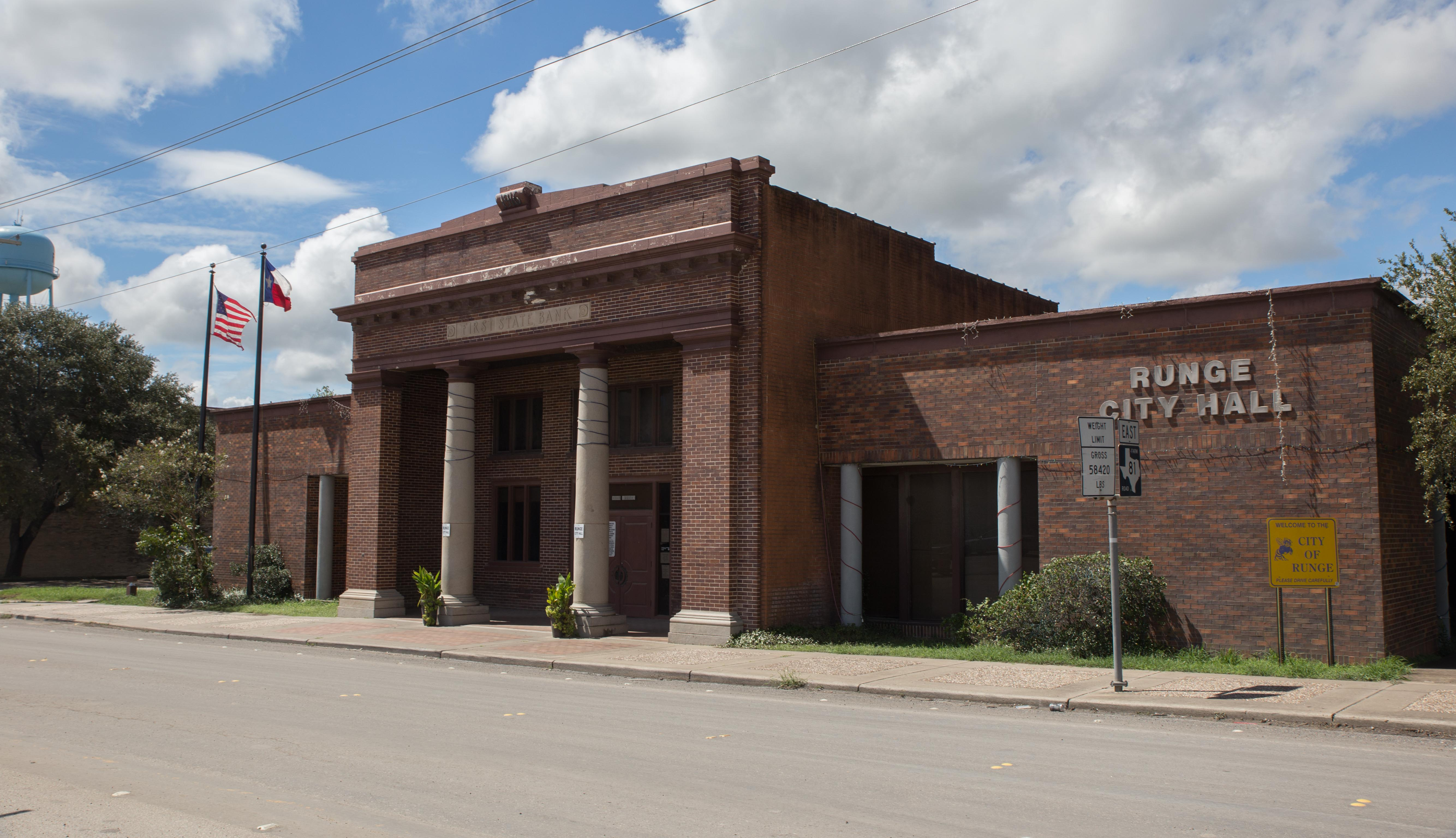
- First State Bank

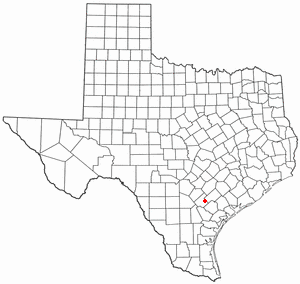
- Location of Runge, Texas

- Coordinates: 28°53′7″N 97°42′46″W
- Country: United States
- State: Texas
- County: Karnes

Area
  - Total: 1.18 sq mi (3.06 km^{2})
  - Land: 1.18 sq mi (3.05 km^{2})
  - Water: 0.0039 sq mi (0.01 km^{2})
- Elevation: 312 ft (95 m)

Population (2020)
  - Total: 892
  - Density: 967.5/sq mi (373.54/km^{2})
- Time zone: UTC-6 (Central (CST))
  - Summer (DST): UTC-5 (CDT)
- ZIP code: 78151
- Area code: 830
- FIPS code: 48-63788
- GNIS feature ID: 1367003

Runge is a town in Karnes County, Texas, United States. The town is pronounced "Run-Gee". The population was 892 at the 2020 census.

== Geography ==
Runge is located in eastern Karnes County at 28°53′7″N 97°42′46″W (28.885172, –97.712769), along Texas State Highway 72. Kenedy is 10 miles (16 km) to the southwest, and Yorktown is 15 miles (24 km) to the northeast.

According to the United States Census Bureau, Runge has a total area of 1.22 square miles (3.15 km^{2}), of which 0.01 square miles (0.02 km^{2}), or 0.66%, are water.

=== Climate ===
The climate in this area is characterized by hot, humid summers and generally mild to cool winters. According to the Köppen Climate Classification system, Runge has a humid subtropical climate, abbreviated "Cfa" on climate maps.

== Demographics ==
Historical population
Census	Pop.	Note	%±
1920	1,070		—
1930	1,136		6.2%
1940	1,001		−11.9%
1950	1,055		5.4%
1960	1,036		−1.8%
1970	1,147		10.7%
1980	1,244		8.5%
1990	1,139		−8.4%
2000	1,080		−5.2%
2010	1,031		−4.5%
2020	892		−13.5%
U.S. Decennial Census

Runge racial composition as of 2020 (NH = Non-Hispanic) (Note: Note: the US Census treats Hispanic/Latino as an ethnic category. This table excludes Latinos from the racial categories and assigns them to a separate category. Hispanics/Latinos can be of any race.)
Race	Number	Percentage
White (NH)	125	14.01%
Black or African American (NH)	8	0.9%
Mixed/Multi-Racial (NH)	22	2.47%
Hispanic or Latino	737	82.62%
Total	892	

As of the 2020 United States census, there were 892 people, 461 households, and 357 families residing in the town.

As of the census of 2000, there were 1,080 people, 395 households, and 289 families residing in the town. The population density was 918.7 inhabitants per square mile (354.7/km^{2}). There were 461 housing units at an average density of 392.1 per square mile (151.4/km^{2}). The racial makeup of the town was 67.22% White, 2.22% African American, 1.11% Native American, 26.67% from other races, and 2.78% from two or more races. Hispanic or Latino of any race were 74.17% of the population.

There were 395 households, out of which 34.9% had children under the age of 18 living with them, 47.6% were married couples living together, 17.5% had a female householder with no husband present, and 26.6% were non-families. 23.3% of all households were made up of individuals, and 14.2% had someone living alone who was 65 years of age or older. The average household size was 2.73 and the average family size was 3.19.

In the town, the population was spread out, with 32.2% under the age of 18, 5.9% from 18 to 24, 25.5% from 25 to 44, 19.4% from 45 to 64, and 17.0% who were 65 years of age or older. The median age was 34 years. For every 100 females, there were 88.5 males. For every 100 females age 18 and over, there were 84.4 males.

The median income for a household in the town was $20,417, and the median income for a family was $22,738. Males had a median income of $20,667 versus $16,375 for females. The per capita income for the town was $8,480. About 27.7% of families and 31.3% of the population were below the poverty line, including 40.9% of those under age 18 and 40.4% of those age 65 or over.

== Education ==
The town is served by the Runge Independent School District.

== Notable people ==
- Claude Davenport, former Major League Baseball player
- Mike Gisler, former National Football League offensive lineman
- John Yanta, Roman Catholic Bishop Emeritus of Amarillo, former Auxiliary Bishop of San Antonio
