= Maria Moreno (activist) =

American farmworker and labor organizer

- Born: Maria Torres Martinez; 1920; Karnes City, Texas
- Died: 1989 (aged 68–69); Arizona
- Occupations: Farm worker and activist
- Years active: 1928–1988
- Known for: Labor organizing
- Spouse: Luis Moreno
- Children: Lilly DeLaTorre, Abel Moreno, Elida Moreno, Elvira Cruz, Martha Moreno Dominguez, Joe Moreno, Elizabeth Lomas, Tito Moreno, Yolanda Moreno, Eva Ooley, Olivia Portugal, Alex Moreno

Maria Moreno (October 22, 1920 – July 9, 1989) was an American farmworker and labor organizer. She was the first woman farmworker hired to be a union representative.

== Early life ==
Moreno was born Maria Martinez Torres in Karnes City, Texas, to migrant workers. Her father, Vicente Martinez, was an orphan of the Mexican Revolution. Her mother, Leonarda Torres, was Mescalero Apache. Maria married Luis Moreno at 15. They joined the Dust Bowl migration to California in 1940. Maria and Luis eventually had 12 children: Lillian, Abel, Elida, Elvira, Martha, Joe, Elizabeth, Tito, Yolanda, Eva, Olivia, and Alex.

== Career ==
Moreno's activism began in 1958, after a flood destroyed crops and stopped farm work. Farmworkers were denied food assistance, and her family nearly starved. In 1959, she was hired as an organizer for the Agricultural Workers Organizing Committee (AWOC), becoming the first female farmworker in the U.S. to be hired as a union organizer.

In December 1961, funding for the AWOC was suspended by the AFL–CIO. Moreno was elected to plead AWOC's case at the national AFL–CIO convention in Miami Beach, Florida. AWOC was such a small union that it granted only one official delegate, Maria Moreno. Her alternate delegate was Neil Scott, an Okie farmworker. Accompanied by fellow AWOC members Otto Johnson and Violet Rotan, they drove across country to attend the conference, where Maria's impassioned speech convinced the organization to restore the funding.

This was an important moment in California labor history, as the movement remained at least minimally active, with the Filipino chapters of AWOC led by Larry Itliong being the most militant. Although the 1965 grape strike is usually credited to Cesar Chavez and Dolores Huerta's National Farm Workers Association, it was started by the Filipino AWOC members, who were later joined by the NFWA. The two groups merged in 1966, affiliating with the national AFL–CIO.

There would not have been the Chavez movement, at least in the form that it eventually assumed, if it hadn't been for the survival of AWOC. Those of us in the volunteer period kept it going. I think it would have disappeared entirely from view if we hadn't been there and if we hadn't had that Strathmore Conference, and if we hadn't sent back the 4 workers to Miami Beach and all the rest of it. We made a difference.

In spite of this success, Moreno's position was terminated by the new management of the AWOC, and the family moved to the Arizona desert, where Maria began her work as a Pentecostal preacher. In 1965, the League of Mexican Women presented Maria Moreno with an achievement award at their annual awards banquet. Maria later moved to the Arizona-Mexico border and built a mission that ministered to the poor. She died of breast cancer in 1989.
