= Karnes County, Texas =

County in Texas, United States

- County
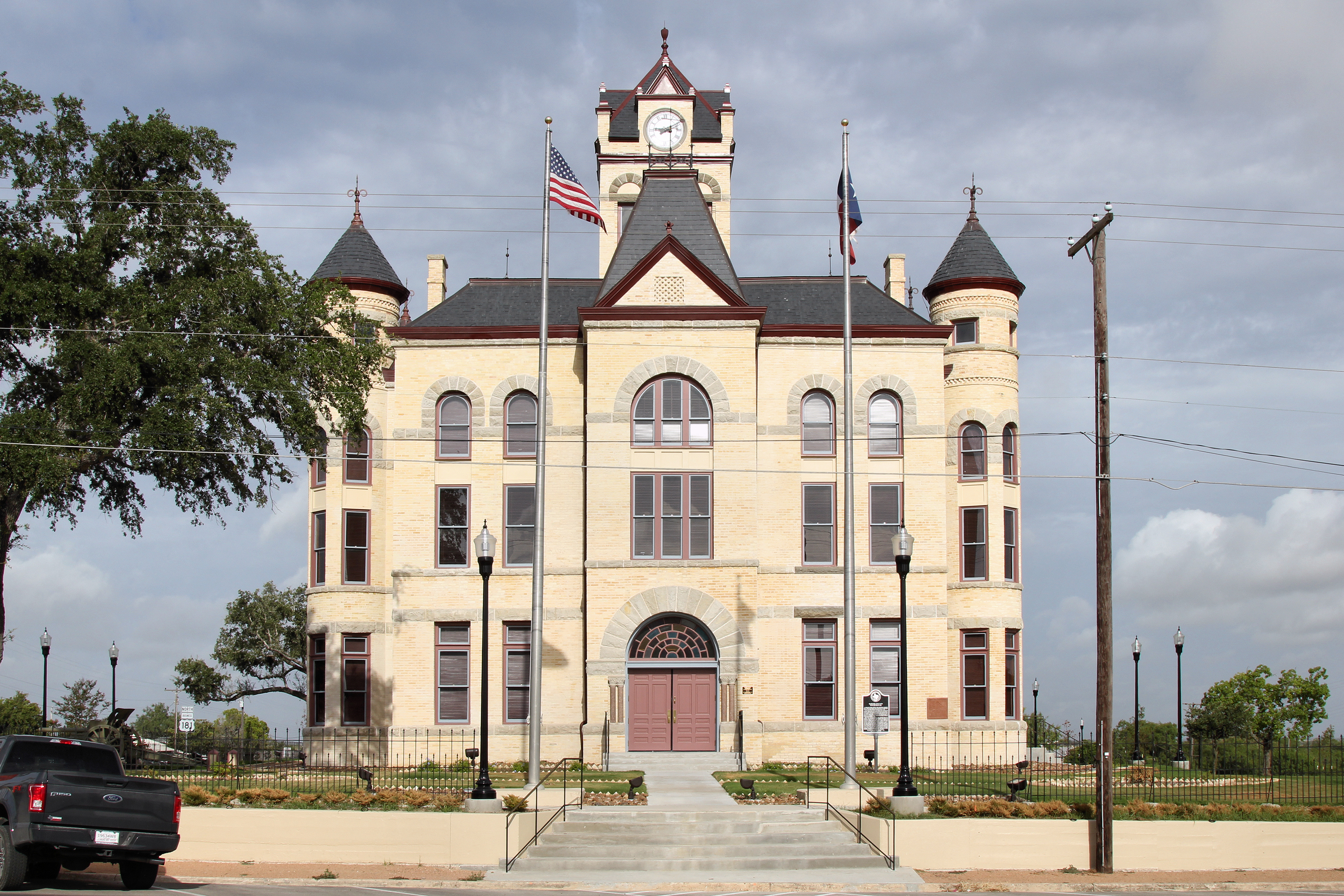
- The Karnes County Courthouse in Karnes City

- Location within the U.S. state of Texas
- Coordinates: 28°55′N 97°52′W
- Country: United States
- State: Texas
- Founded: February 4, 1854
- Named for: Henry Karnes
- Seat: Karnes City
- Largest city: Kenedy

Area
  - Total: 754 sq mi (1,950 km^{2})
  - Land: 748 sq mi (1,940 km^{2})
  - Water: 6.0 sq mi (16 km^{2}) 0.8%

Population (2020)
  - Total: 14,710
  - Estimate (2025): 15,018 ▲
  - Density: 19.7/sq mi (7.59/km^{2})
- Time zone: UTC−6 (Central)
  - Summer (DST): UTC−5 (CDT)
- ZIP Codes: 78111, 78113, 78116, 78118, 78117, 78119, 78141, 78144, 78151
- Area code: 830
- Congressional district: 15th
- Website: www.co.karnes.tx.us

Karnes County is a county in the U.S. state of Texas. As of the 2020 census, the population was 14,710. Its county seat is Karnes City. The county is named for Henry Karnes, a soldier in the Texas Revolution. The former San Antonio and Aransas Pass Railway passed through Karnes County in its connection linking San Antonio with Corpus Christi.

== Geography ==
According to the U.S. Census Bureau, the county has a total area of 754 square miles (1,950 km^{2}), of which 748 square miles (1,940 km^{2}) is land and 6.0 square miles (16 km^{2}) (0.8%) is water.

=== Adjacent counties ===
- Gonzales County (northeast)
- DeWitt County (east)
- Goliad County (southeast)
- Bee County (south)
- Live Oak County (southwest)
- Atascosa County (west)
- Wilson County (northwest)

== Demographics ==
Historical population
Census	Pop.	Note	%±
1860	2,171		—
1870	1,705		−21.5%
1880	3,270		91.8%
1890	3,637		11.2%
1900	8,681		138.7%
1910	14,942		72.1%
1920	19,049		27.5%
1930	23,316		22.4%
1940	19,248		−17.4%
1950	17,139		−11.0%
1960	14,995		−12.5%
1970	13,462		−10.2%
1980	13,593		1.0%
1990	12,455		−8.4%
2000	15,446		24.0%
2010	14,824		−4.0%
2020	14,710		−0.8%
2025 (est.)	15,018	▲	2.1%
U.S. Decennial Census; 1850–2010 2010–2014

=== 2020 census ===
As of the 2020 census, there were 14,710 people, 4,594 households, and 3,156 families residing in the county.

The median age was 39.2 years; 19.4% were under the age of 18 and 16.4% were 65 years of age or older. For every 100 females there were 140.1 males, and among those 18 and over there were 149.6 males per 100 females.

The racial makeup of the county was 55.8% White, 8.0% Black or African American, 0.6% American Indian and Alaska Native, 1.0% Asian, <0.1% Native Hawaiian and Pacific Islander, 16.7% from some other race, and 17.8% from two or more races. Hispanic or Latino residents of any race comprised 52.6% of the population.

<0.1% of residents lived in urban areas, while 100.0% lived in rural areas.

Of those households, 30.9% had children under the age of 18 living in them, 43.9% were married-couple households, 22.2% were households with a male householder and no spouse or partner present, and 27.8% were households with a female householder and no spouse or partner present. About 29.3% of all households were made up of individuals and 14.6% had someone living alone who was 65 years of age or older.

There were 5,796 housing units, of which 20.7% were vacant. Among occupied housing units, 69.3% were owner-occupied and 30.7% were renter-occupied. The homeowner vacancy rate was 2.2% and the rental vacancy rate was 15.9%.

=== Racial and ethnic composition ===
Karnes County, Texas – Racial and ethnic composition Note: the US Census treats Hispanic/Latino as an ethnic category. This table excludes Latinos from the racial categories and assigns them to a separate category. Hispanics/Latinos may be of any race.
Race / Ethnicity (NH = Non-Hispanic)	Pop 1980	Pop 1990	Pop 2000	Pop 2010	Pop 2020	% 1980	% 1990	% 2000	% 2010	% 2020
White alone (NH)	7,272	6,136	6,309	5,956	5,388	53.50%	49.27%	40.85%	40.18%	36.63%
Black or African American alone (NH)	382	343	1,603	1,351	1,116	2.81%	2.75%	10.38%	9.11%	7.59%
Native American or Alaska Native alone (NH)	9	16	37	37	26	0.07%	0.13%	0.24%	0.25%	0.18%
Asian alone (NH)	16	12	62	25	145	0.12%	0.10%	0.40%	0.17%	0.99%
Native Hawaiian or Pacific Islander alone (NH)	x	x	2	2	1	x	x	0.01%	0.01%	0.01%
Other race alone (NH)	70	32	7	18	61	0.51%	0.26%	0.05%	0.12%	0.41%
Mixed race or Multiracial (NH)	x	x	102	59	239	x	x	0.66%	0.40%	1.62%
Hispanic or Latino (any race)	5,844	5,916	7,324	7,376	7,734	42.99%	47.50%	47.42%	49.76%	52.58%
Total	13,593	12,455	15,446	14,824	14,710	100.00%	100.00%	100.00%	100.00%	100.00%

=== 2000 census ===
As of the 2000 United States census, there were 15,446 people, 4,454 households, and 3,246 families residing in the county. The population density was 21 people per square mile (8.1 people/km^{2}). There were 5,479 housing units at an average density of 7 units per square mile (2.7/km^{2}). The racial makeup of the county was 68.55% White, 10.79% Black or African American, 0.68% Native American, 0.43% Asian American, 0.06% Pacific Islander, 17.23% of other races, and 2.26% two or more races. 47.42% of the population were Hispanic or Latino American of any race.

There were 4,454 households, out of which 34.00% had children under the age of 18 living with them, 53.60% were married couples living together, 13.70% had a female householder with no husband present, and 27.10% were non-families. 24.40% of all households were made up of individuals, and 13.60% had someone living alone who was 65 years of age or older. The average household size was 2.66 and the average family size was 3.15.

In the county, the population was spread out, with 21.80% under the age of 18, 11.50% from 18 to 24, 34.20% from 25 to 44, 18.20% from 45 to 64, and 14.40% who were 65 years of age or older. The median age was 34 years. For every 100 females there were 146.20 males. For every 100 females age 18 and over, there were 162.50 males.

The median income for a household in the county was $26,526, and the median income for a family was $30,565. Males had a median income of $27,260 versus $19,367 for females. The per capita income for the county was $13,603. About 18.50% of families and 21.90% of the population were below the poverty line, including 29.10% of those under age 18 and 20.50% of those age 65 or over.

== Economy ==
Around 2008 ConocoPhillips drilled a well in Karnes County and struck oil, causing an economic boom.

== Government and politics ==
United States presidential election results for Karnes County, Texas
Year	Republican		Democratic		Third party(ies)	
Year	No.	%	No.	%	No.	%
1912	66	7.96%	710	85.65%	53	6.39%
1916	238	20.95%	889	78.26%	9	0.79%
1920	484	31.27%	642	41.47%	422	27.26%
1924	531	21.27%	1,727	69.19%	238	9.54%
1928	855	44.83%	1,052	55.17%	0	0.00%
1932	186	7.02%	2,458	92.75%	6	0.23%
1936	371	15.16%	2,067	84.47%	9	0.37%
1940	631	23.88%	2,010	76.08%	1	0.04%
1944	692	24.23%	1,920	67.23%	244	8.54%
1948	592	19.93%	2,198	73.98%	181	6.09%
1952	2,374	55.73%	1,884	44.23%	2	0.05%
1956	1,764	51.62%	1,636	47.88%	17	0.50%
1960	1,526	37.36%	2,556	62.57%	3	0.07%
1964	993	23.77%	3,178	76.08%	6	0.14%
1968	1,342	31.22%	2,271	52.83%	686	15.96%
1972	2,639	59.60%	1,780	40.20%	9	0.20%
1976	1,675	35.50%	2,996	63.50%	47	1.00%
1980	2,719	53.59%	2,284	45.01%	71	1.40%
1984	3,068	62.84%	1,802	36.91%	12	0.25%
1988	2,383	48.31%	2,529	51.27%	21	0.43%
1992	1,990	42.34%	1,897	40.36%	813	17.30%
1996	1,869	43.12%	2,154	49.70%	311	7.18%
2000	2,638	61.23%	1,617	37.53%	53	1.23%
2004	3,114	66.64%	1,543	33.02%	16	0.34%
2008	2,736	60.44%	1,760	38.88%	31	0.68%
2012	2,825	67.50%	1,325	31.66%	35	0.84%
2016	2,965	70.63%	1,145	27.27%	88	2.10%
2020	3,968	75.54%	1,234	23.49%	51	0.97%
2024	4,001	78.84%	1,051	20.71%	23	0.45%

United States Senate election results for Karnes County, Texas1
Year	Republican		Democratic		Third party(ies)	
Year	No.	%	No.	%	No.	%
2024	3,743	74.71%	1,175	23.45%	92	1.84%

United States Senate election results for Karnes County, Texas2
Year	Republican		Democratic		Third party(ies)	
Year	No.	%	No.	%	No.	%
2020	3,833	75.32%	1,178	23.15%	78	1.53%

Texas Gubernatorial election results for Karnes County
Year	Republican		Democratic		Third party(ies)	
Year	No.	%	No.	%	No.	%
2022	3,007	78.76%	776	20.32%	35	0.92%

=== Government ===
Karnes County, like all counties in Texas, is governed by a commissioners' court. This court consists of the county judge (the chairperson of the court), who is elected county-wide, and four commissioners who are elected by the voters in each of four precincts.

The Commissioners' Court is the policy-making body for the county; in addition, the county judge is the senior executive and administrative position in the county. The Commissioners' Court sets the county tax rate, adopts the budget, appoints boards and commissions, approves grants and personnel actions, and oversees the administration of county government. Each commissioner supervises a Road and Bridge District. The Commissioners' Court approves the budget and sets the tax rate for the hospital district, which is charged with the responsibility for providing acute medical care for citizens who otherwise would not receive adequate medical services.

Karnes County is represented in the United States Congress as part of Texas's 15th congressional district, represented by Republican Monica De La Cruz of Edinburg. Its two senators are Ted Cruz and John Cornyn, both Republicans. At the state level, Karnes County is represented in the Texas State Legislature as part of Texas's 31st House of Representatives district, represented by Republican Ryan Guillen of Rio Grande City, and Texas's 21st Senate district, represented by Democrat Judith Zaffirini of Laredo.

==== County Commissioners ====
Office	Name	Party
County Judge	Wade Hedtke	Republican
Commissioner, Precinct 1	David Wiatrek	Republican
Commissioner, Precinct 2	Tyler Witte	Republican
Commissioner, Precinct 3	James Rosales	Republican
Commissioner, Precinct 4	Robert Busselman	Republican

==== Justices of the Peace ====
Office	Name	Party
Justice of the Peace, Precinct 1	Rachel Garcia	Democratic
Justice of the Peace, Precinct 2	Caroline Korzekwa	Republican
Justice of the Peace, Precinct 3	Delmiro Villanueva, Jr.	Republican
Justice of the Peace, Precinct 4	David Sotelo	Democratic

==== Constables ====
Office	Name	Party
Constable, Precinct 1	Roel Salas	Republican
Constable, Precinct 2	Donald Hons	Republican
Constable, Precinct 3	David Kunschik	Republican
Constable, Precinct 4	John Brynelsen	Republican

==== County Offices ====
Office	Name	Party
District/County Attorney	Jennifer Tapia	Republican
District Clerk	Denise Rodriguez	Republican
County Clerk	Jamie Leal	Republican
Sheriff	Steven Bailey	Republican
Tax Assessor-Collector	Tammy Braudaway	Republican
Treasurer	Rebecca Bartosch	Republican

=== Politics ===
Historically, Karnes County, like much of Texas, was a Democratic Party stronghold despite its large number of Polish and Silesian immigrants, who were generally opposed to slavery. Despite this, the recency of their arrival (which meant most of them did not have citizenship) meant that they were unable to vote, and Karnes County thus voted decisively for both separatism and Democrats, spurred in part by intervention from the Knights of the Golden Circle. Following Texas's re-admission to the Union, Karnes County remained a Democratic stronghold for decades until it broke for Republican Dwight D. Eisenhower by a large margin. Throughout the rest of the 20th century, Karnes County would oscillate between Republicans and Democrats, frequently by large margins. In the 21st century, Karnes County shifted much more quickly towards the Republican Party than most Hispanic counties in South Texas, and it is now safely Republican, with the Republican candidate having gained in vote percentage in every election since 2008. Karnes County now votes straight-ticket Republican, only having a few Democratic elected officials at the local level.

== Transportation ==
=== Airport ===
- There is a small regional airport at Kenedy. The airport has no scheduled flights and is mainly for civilian use.

=== Bus ===
- A new Alamo Regional Transit route now connects Karnes City, Runge, and Kenedy, making travel between the communities easier for residents.

=== Highways ===
- U.S. Highway 181
- State Highway 72
- State Highway 80
- State Highway 119
- State Highway 123
- State Highway 239
- Spur 117
- Spur 190

== Education ==
School districts include:

- Falls City Independent School District
- Karnes City Independent School District
- Kenedy Independent School District
- Nixon-Smiley Consolidated Independent School District
- Nordheim Independent School District
- Pawnee Independent School District
- Pettus Independent School District
- Runge Independent School District

Coastal Bend College (formerly Bee County College) is the designated community college for the county.

== Communities ==
=== Cities ===
- Falls City
- Karnes City (county seat)
- Kenedy

=== Town ===
- Runge

=== Unincorporated communities ===
- Cestohowa
- Choate
- Ecleto
- Gillett
- Hobson
- Panna Maria
- Pawelekville

=== Ghost towns ===
- Helena
- Wintergreen

== See also ==
- National Register of Historic Places listings in Karnes County, Texas
- Recorded Texas Historic Landmarks in Karnes County
