= Kazimierz Pawełek =

Polish journalist and politician

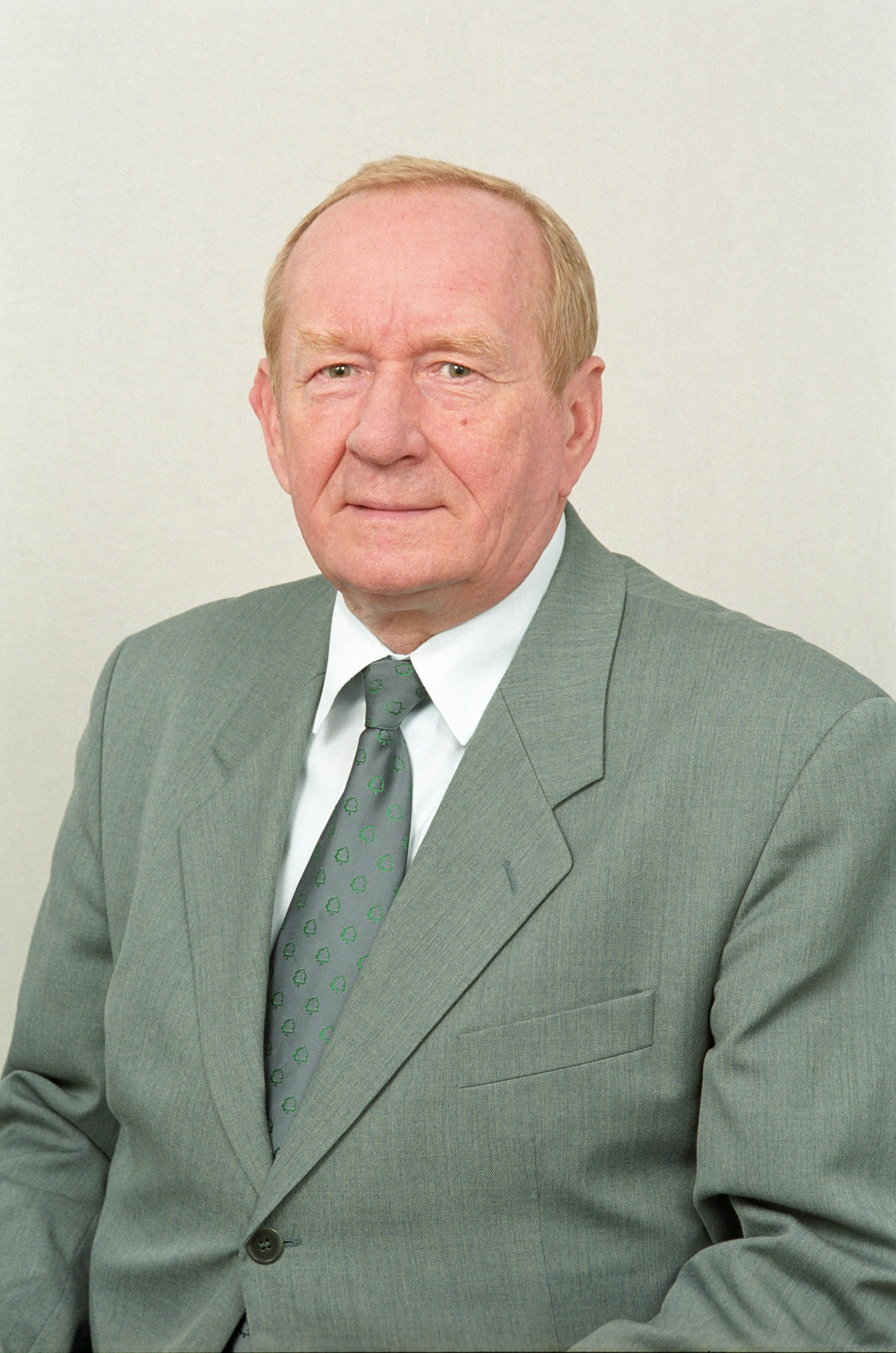
Kazimierz Pawełek

Kazimierz Pawełek (21 February 1936 in Bochnia – 3 December 2017) was a Polish journalist and politician.

Pawełek was a student at the Warsaw School of Economics studying foreign affairs when he began writing for the magazines Szpilki, Echo Krakowa, and Sport. Upon graduation, he joined the staff of Dziennik Polski, and moved to Lublin in 1960. In the 1970s, Pawełek became the editor of Głos Budowlanych. Later he served as literary director for the cabarets Desant and Korkociąg, and also wrote adaptations of Czart and Pod Egidą. From 1983 to 2001, Pawełek worked for the Kurier Lubelski. Over the course of his career, Pawełek was awarded the Silver Cross of Merit and named a knight of the Order of Polonia Restituta. From 2001 to 2005, Pawełek served in the Senate, representing the Democratic Left Alliance – Labour Union electoral coalition.
