= Faith Christian Academy =

Private K-12 Christian school in Orlando, Florida, United States

Location
- 9307 Curry Ford Road; Orlando, Florida; 28.5129586°N 81.2559741°W

Information
- Type: Private School
- Religious affiliation: Assemblies of God
- Established: 1972; 54 years ago
- NCES School ID: AA000494
- Principal: Angel Carrington
- Faculty: 43.4
- Grades: PK-12
- Enrollment: 672 (2016)
- Colors: Maroon, Black, White
- Team name: Lions
- Website: fcalions.org

Faith Christian Academy (FCA) is a private K-12 Christian school in Orlando, Florida. It had 672 students enrolled (PK–12) in 2018.

== History ==
Faith Christian Academy was founded in 1972 as a ministry of Faith Assembly of God on its Goldenrod Campus. In 2012, along with Faith Assembly, FCA moved to its new state-of-the-art Curry Ford campus, which has allowed significant growth due to the larger facility.

In 2013, a 12-year-old African American student at the school complained to staff of having been bullied by her white classmates for having afro-textured hair. Rather than addressing the bullying, she was met with a threat of expulsion by school officials, who said her afro violated the school's dress code. The school's official handbook made mention of inappropriate hairstyles in the grooming codes, but none relating to afro-textured hair. Administrators asked her to cut or straighten her hair, but she refused, stating, “This is the hair that God gave me and I will not be afraid to show it.” After the incident received media attention, the school neither expelled her nor took action on the bullying allegations.

== Athletics ==
Faith Christian Academy is a part of the Florida High School Athletic Association.

=== Girls' sports ===
- Basketball
- Softball
- Track and field
- Volleyball
- Weightlifting
- Flag Football

=== Boys' sports ===
- Baseball
- Basketball
- Football
- Soccer
- Track and field
- Weightlifting
- Golf
- E-sports
