= Runge Independent School District =

School district in Texas, United States

Address
- 600 North Reiffert Street Runge, TX, 78151; United States

District information
- Grades: PK–12
- Schools: 3
- NCES District ID: 4838310

Students and staff
- Students: 196 (2023–2024)
- Teachers: 20.25 (on an FTE basis)
- Student–teacher ratio: 9.68:1

Other information
- Website: www.rungeisd.org

Runge Independent School District is a public school district based in Runge, Texas (USA). The district has two campuses - Runge High (Grades 7–12) and Runge Elementary (Grades PK-6).

== History ==
In 2009, the school district was rated "recognized" by the Texas Education Agency.

=== COVID-19 ===
On August 21, 2023, ISD superintendent Hector Dominguez announced that its schools would be shut down until August 29 due to a "recent surge of positive COVID-19 cases" in the district. A "COVID-19 tracker" hosted on Runge ISD's website showed that there were 10 "active cases" among staff members at the time of the closure.

== Controversy ==
In July 2024, the ACLU of Texas sent Runge Independent School District a letter, alleging that the district's 2023-2024 dress and grooming code appeared to violate the Texas CROWN Act, a state law which prohibits racial discrimination based on hair texture or styles, and asking the district to revise its policies for the 2024-2025 school year.
