= Pawelekville, Texas =

Pawelekville
- Unincorporated community
- Location in Texas and the United States Pawelekville (the United States)
- Coordinates: 29°03′09″N 97°56′02″W
- Country: United States
- State: Texas
- County: Karnes

Population (2014)
  - Total: 110
- Time zone: UTC-6 (Central (CST))
  - Summer (DST): UTC-5 (CDT)
- ZIP codes: 78113
- FIPS code: 1364904

Pawelekville is an unincorporated community in Karnes County, Texas, United States. In 2014 it was inhabited by 110 people.

== History ==
The settlement was founded by Silesian immigrants in the second half of the 19th century. Prior to 1947, it was called Carvajal Crossing, after the nearby ford with that name, located on the Cibolo Creek. It was later renamed to Pawelekville, after the Pawelek family.

In 1990, the community included a small number of houses, around several businesses that served the local agricultural community. Between 1964 and 1965, Pawelekville had 65 inhabitants. From 1970 to 2000, the population was estimated to be 105. In 2014 it had a population of 110.
