= Panna Maria, Texas =

- Unincorporated community
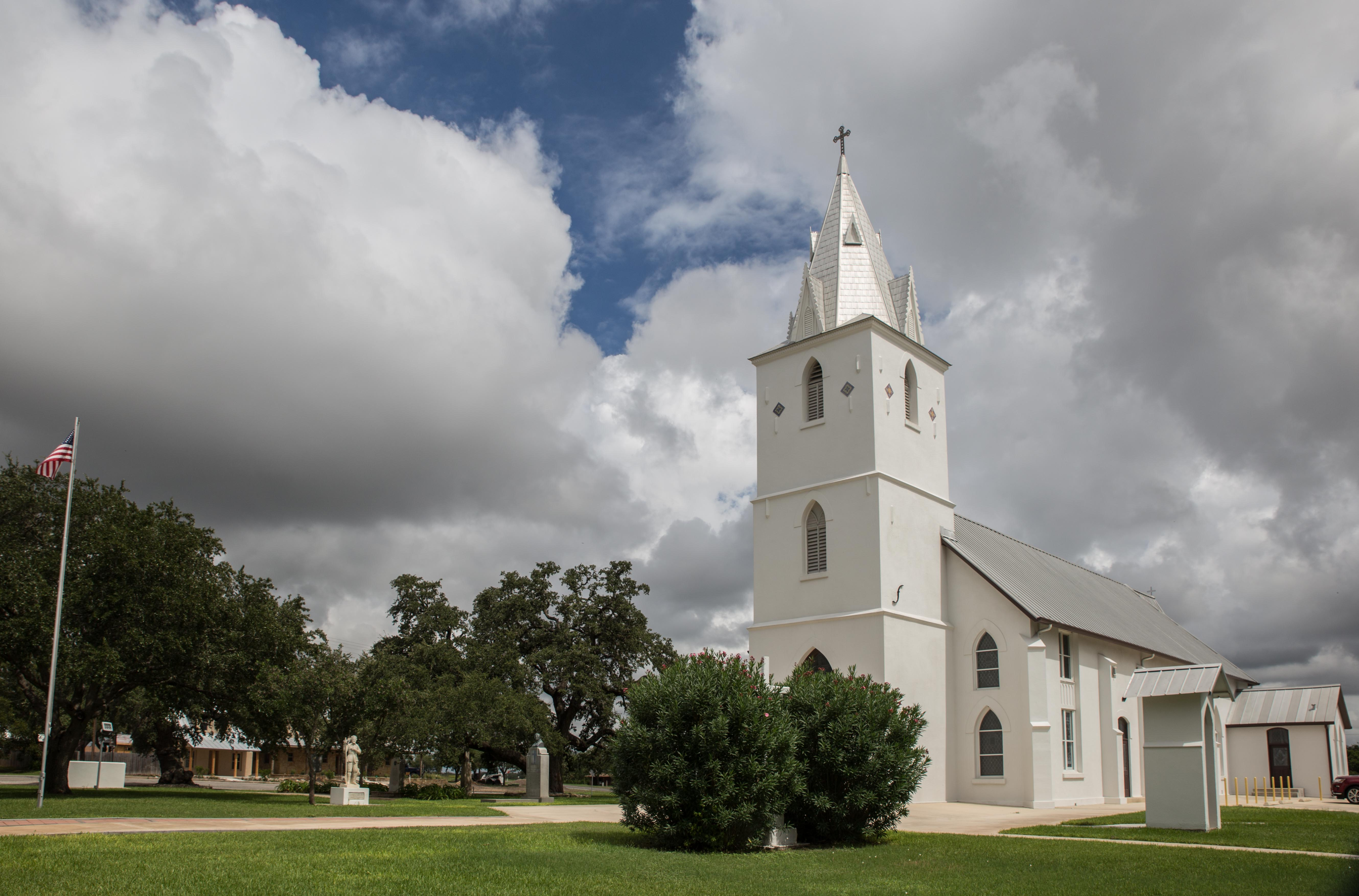
- Immaculate Conception Catholic Church

- Location in Texas and the United States Panna Maria (the United States)
- Coordinates: 28°57′29″N 97°53′50″W
- Country: United States
- State: Texas
- County: Karnes
- Time zone: UTC-6 (Central (CST))
  - Summer (DST): UTC-5 (CDT)
- ZIP codes: 78144
- GNIS feature ID: 1364749
- Panna Maria Historic District
- U.S. National Register of Historic Places
- U.S. Historic district
- Area: 2,400 acres (970 ha)
- Built: 1854
- Architectural style: Gothic Revival, Polish Colonial
- NRHP reference No.: 76002043
- Added to NRHP: May 13, 1976

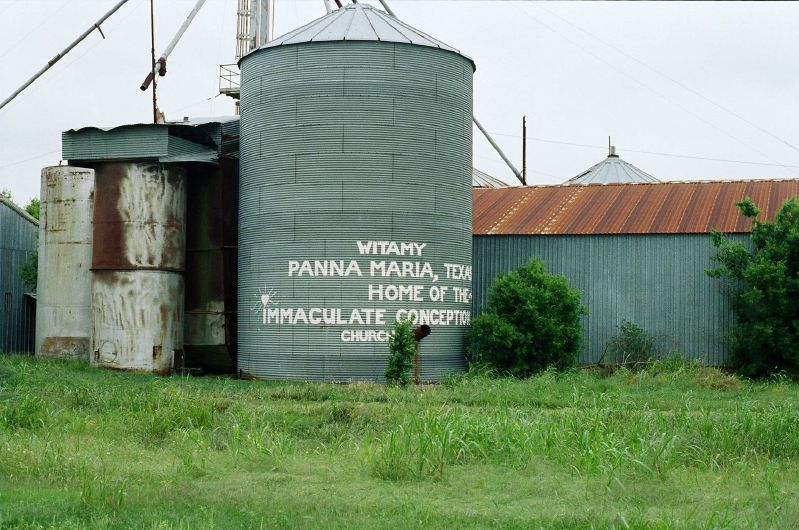
Hand-painted welcome sign welcoming visitors to town

Panna Maria (Polish for Virgin Mary) is a small unincorporated community in Karnes County, Texas, United States. It is the oldest Polish settlement in the United States.

== History ==
A Franciscan missionary, Father Leopold Moczygemba, started recruiting Upper Silesians in 1852, when Silesia belonged to the Kingdom of Prussia. The immigrants began arriving at Indianola in early December 1854. With carts to haul them inland being scarce, the immigrants walked to their land grants near San Antonio and the town was settled on Christmas Eve in 1854.

The town's identity as an insular Polish enclave was sealed by four factors:

1. Bypassed by the railroads
2. Union in sympathy (Settlers were also unionist and were occasionally massacred in Texas during this period)
3. Polish Resurrectionist priests arrived from Europe
4. A sisterhood of Polish teaching nuns was established

The Texas Silesian dialect has continued to be spoken for several generations.

The Panna Maria Historic District is listed on the National Register of Historic Places.

== See also ==
- National Register of Historic Places listings in Karnes County, Texas
- Recorded Texas Historic Landmarks in Karnes County
