= Hobson, Texas =

Unincorporated community in Texas, U.S.

Coordinates: 28°57′27″N 97°59′07″W

Hobson is an unincorporated community in Karnes County, Texas, United States. According to the Handbook of Texas, the community had an estimated population of 135 in 2000. The ZIP Code for Hobson is 78117.

== Industry ==
The community is the site of the Hobson uranium processing plant, operated by Uranium Energy Corp. The plant treats uranium loaded resin beads from the Palangana ISR ion exchange facility in Duval County, and from the Goliad ISR ion exchange facility in Goliad County, processing the material into yellowcake. The plant was originally constructed in 1978, and fully refurbished in 2008. It currently operates at roughly 20% of capacity.

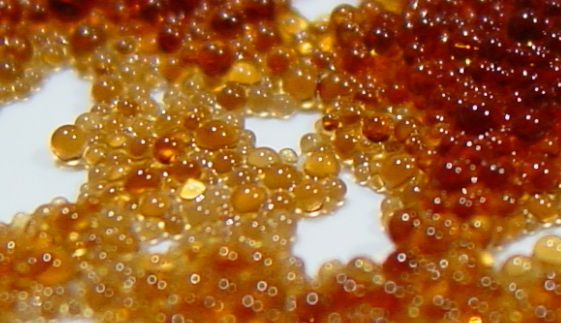
Ion exchange resin beads
