= Karnes City, Texas =

- City
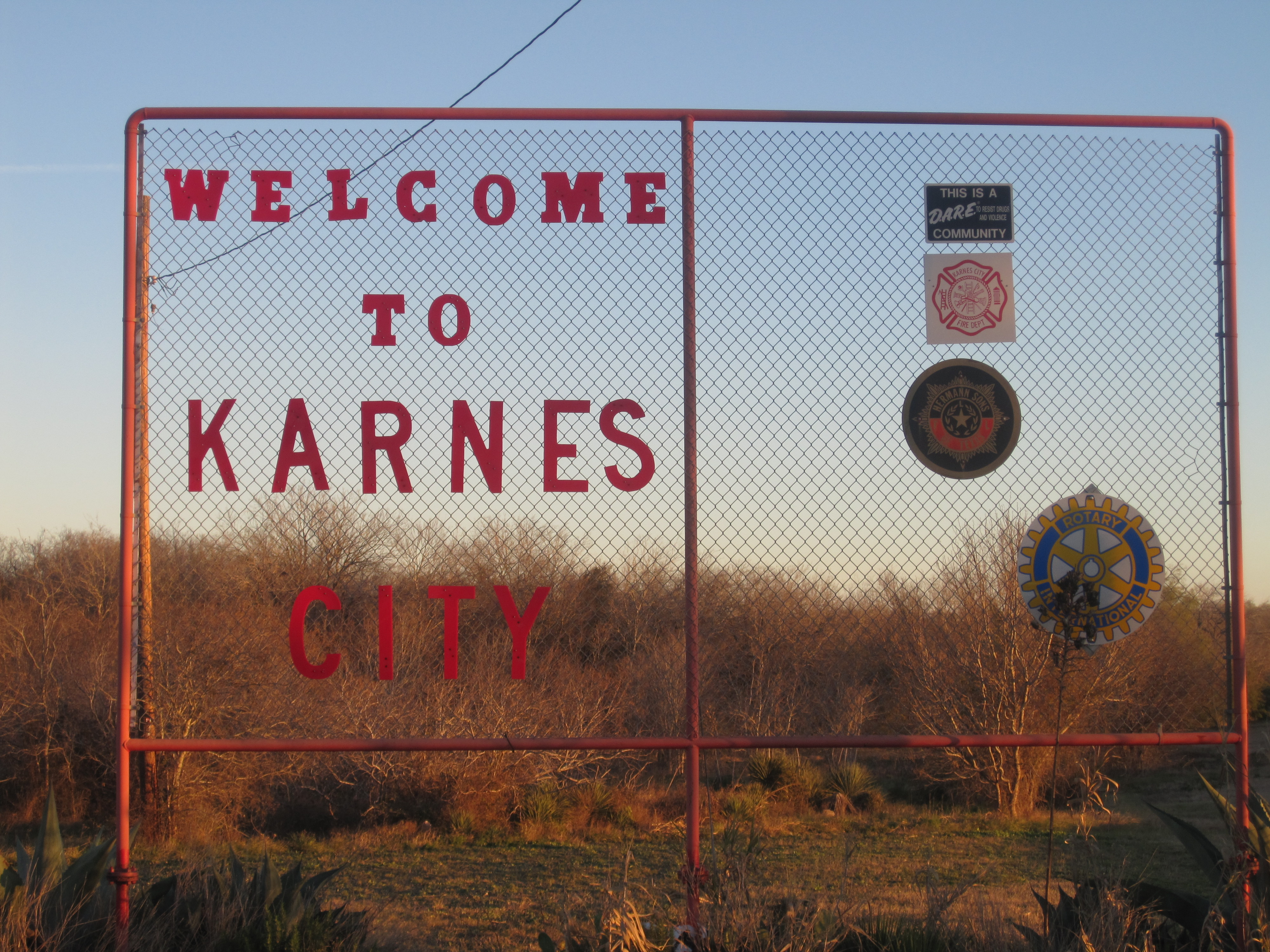
- Welcome sign at Karnes City

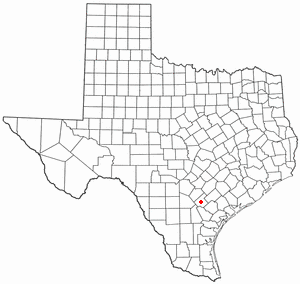
- Location of Karnes City, Texas

- Coordinates: 28°53′N 97°54′W
- Country: United States
- State: Texas
- County: Karnes
- Named after: Henry Karnes

Government
  - City Manager: Veronica Butler

Area
  - Total: 2.32 sq mi (6.00 km^{2})
  - Land: 2.29 sq mi (5.92 km^{2})
  - Water: 0.031 sq mi (0.08 km^{2})
- Elevation: 430 ft (131 m)

Population (2020)
  - Total: 3,111
  - Density: 1,479.7/sq mi (571.32/km^{2})
- Time zone: UTC-6 (Central (CST))
  - Summer (DST): UTC-5 (CDT)
- ZIP code: 78118
- Area code: 830
- FIPS code: 48-38452
- GNIS feature ID: 1360493
- Website: cityofkctx.com

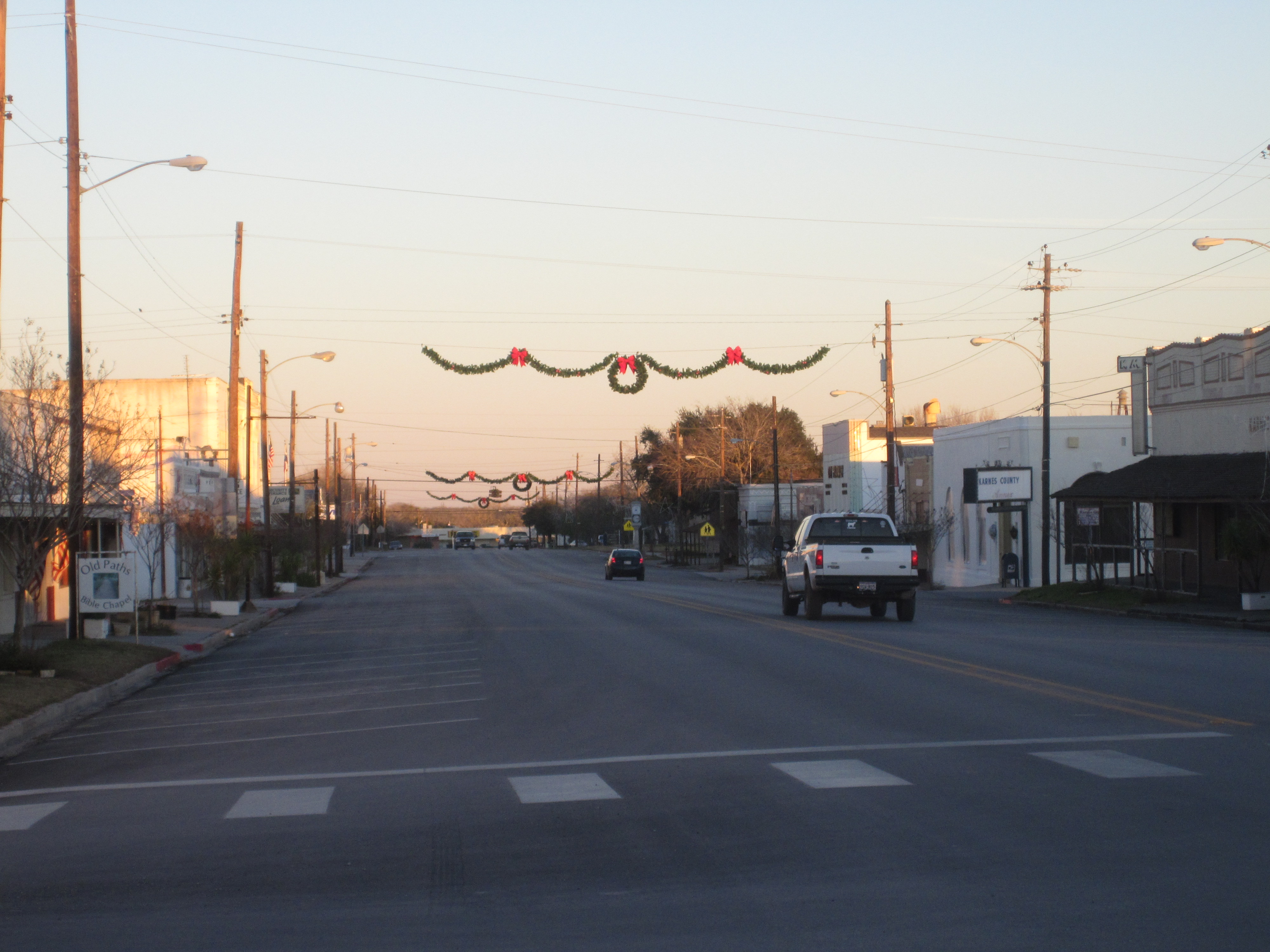
Downtown Karnes City near dusk.

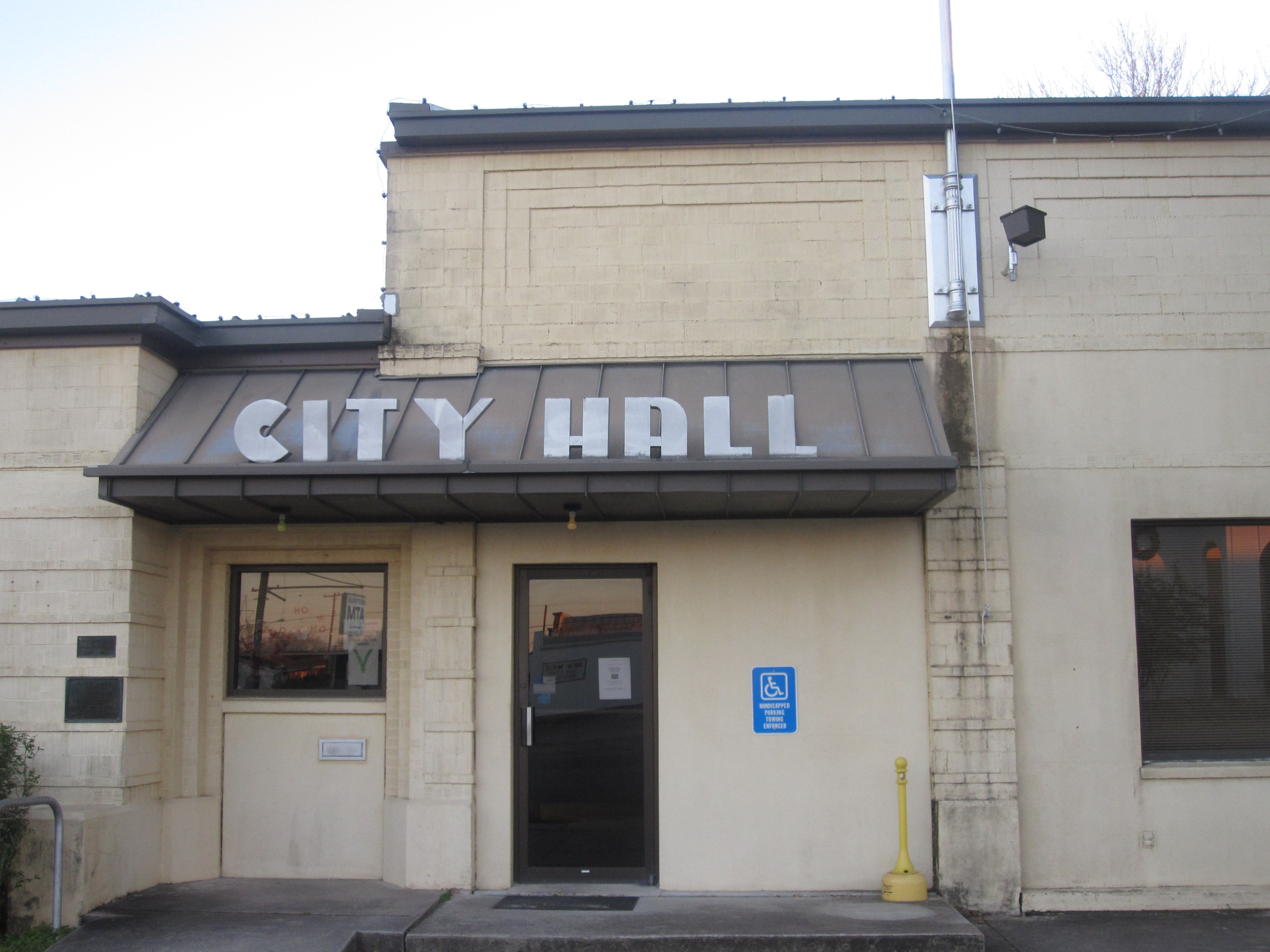
City Hall in Karnes City.

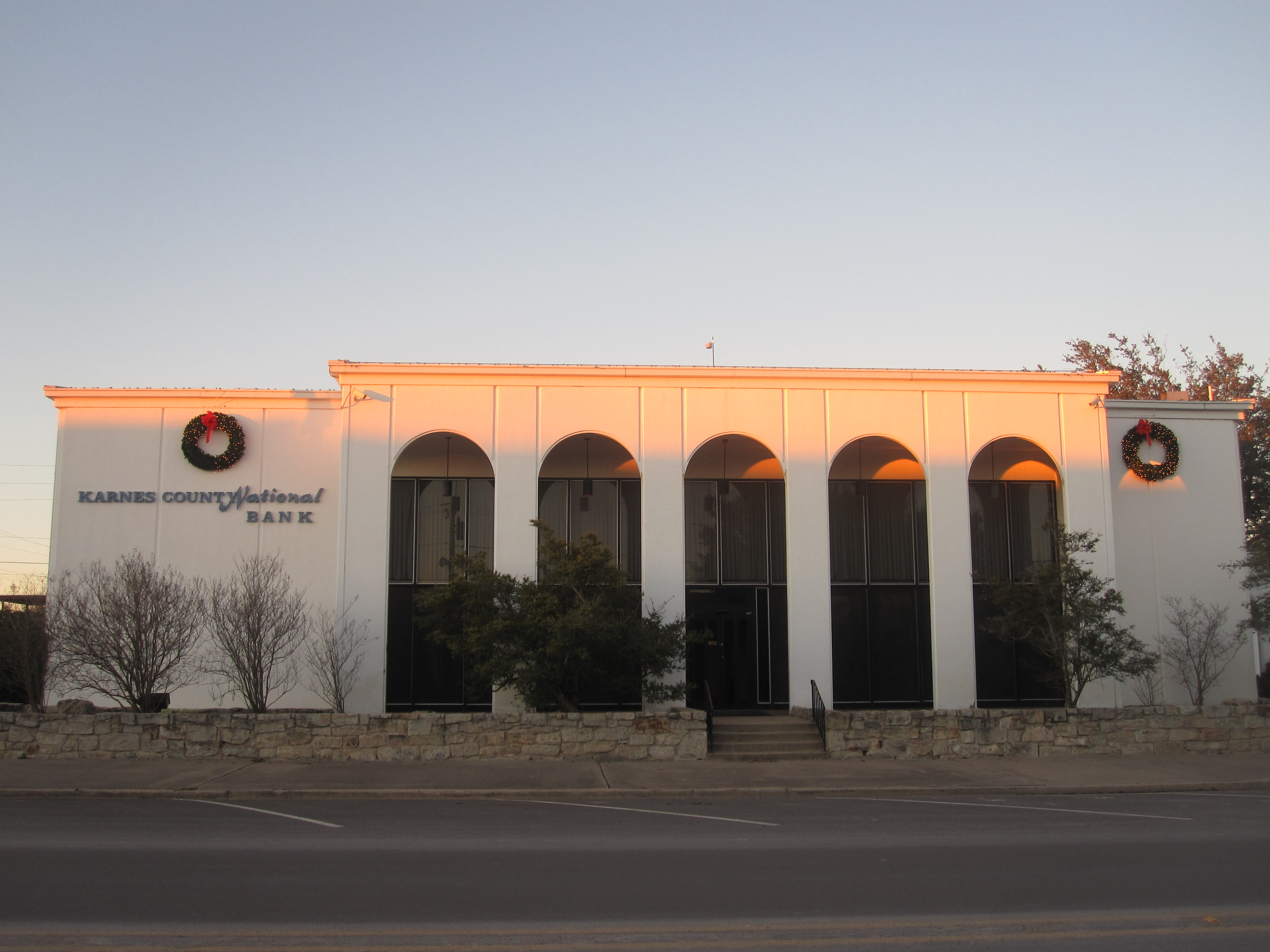
Karnes City National Bank is across from City Hall.

Karnes City is a city in and the county seat of Karnes County, Texas, United States. Its population was 3,111 at the 2020 census, up from 3,042 at the 2010 census. The town was named after Henry Karnes of the Texas Revolution. Karnes is 24 miles (39 km) southeast of Floresville and 54 miles (87 km) southeast of San Antonio on U.S. Highway 181.

== History ==
In 1894, as a result of a special election, the county seat was moved from Helena to Karnes City. Ten years earlier, Colonel William G. Butler (1831–1912) had blamed Helena and its corrupt mayor for the death of his son, Emmett, who was killed on December 26, 1884, by a stray bullet from a bar fight. Butler, a wealthy rancher, retaliated by arranging for the San Antonio and Aransas Pass Railway, which started construction in 1885, to bypass Helena.

The railway started operation in 1886. By 1890, with no rail line, Helena was at a disadvantage for serving the county's needs. In 1890, a group of businessmen purchased land on the rail line, 7 miles (11 km) southwest of Helena, with the specific intent of building a new town to serve as the county seat. The new town, named for Colonel Henry Wax Karnes (1812–1840), veteran of the Texas Revolution and a leader of the Texas Rangers, was a viable settlement by 1894, when the county voted to move its seat from Helena. Karnes City continued to grow, while Helena faded into a ghost town.

The story was fictionalized in the 1969 episode "The Oldest Law" of the television series Death Valley Days. In the episode, Jim Davis played the role of Colonel Butler, while Stacy Harris played Helena's mayor.

== Geography ==
Karnes City is located in central Karnes County at 28°53′N 97°54′W (28.8882, –97.9013). According to the United States Census Bureau, the city has a total area of 2.1 square miles (5.5 km^{2}), of which 0.03 sq mi (0.08 km^{2}), or 1.37%, is covered by water.

U.S. 181 runs through the southwest side of Karnes City, leading northwest 54 miles (87 km) to San Antonio and south 37 miles (60 km) to Beeville. Texas State Highway 123 runs north from Karnes City 25 miles (40 km) to Stockdale, and State Highway 80 leads northeast 19 miles (31 km) to Gillett.

== Demographics ==
Historical population
Census	Pop.	Note	%±
1920	787		—
1930	1,141		45.0%
1940	1,571		37.7%
1950	2,588		64.7%
1960	2,693		4.1%
1970	2,926		8.7%
1980	3,296		12.6%
1990	2,916		−11.5%
2000	3,457		18.6%
2010	3,042		−12.0%
2020	3,111		2.3%
U.S. Decennial Census

=== 2020 census ===
As of the 2020 census, Karnes City had a population of 3,111 and a median age of 38.0 years. 26.4% of residents were under the age of 18 and 15.8% of residents were 65 years of age or older. For every 100 females there were 95.4 males, and for every 100 females age 18 and over there were 94.5 males age 18 and over.

0.0% of residents lived in urban areas, while 100.0% lived in rural areas.

There were 1,156 households in Karnes City, of which 36.6% had children under the age of 18 living in them. Of all households, 36.9% were married-couple households, 22.4% were households with a male householder and no spouse or partner present, and 32.4% were households with a female householder and no spouse or partner present. About 29.2% of all households were made up of individuals and 14.4% had someone living alone who was 65 years of age or older.

There were 1,374 housing units, of which 15.9% were vacant. The homeowner vacancy rate was 2.3% and the rental vacancy rate was 13.0%.

Racial composition as of the 2020 census
Race	Number	Percent
White	1,598	51.4%
Black or African American	117	3.8%
American Indian and Alaska Native	38	1.2%
Asian	10	0.3%
Native Hawaiian and Other Pacific Islander	2	0.1%
Some other race	467	15.0%
Two or more races	879	28.3%
Hispanic or Latino (of any race)	2,040	65.6%

=== 2000 census ===
As of the census of 2000, 3,457 people, 1,007 households, and 720 families lived in the city. The population density was 1,627.6 inhabitants per square mile (628.4/km^{2}). The 1,180 housing units had an average density of 555.6/sq mi (214.5/km^{2}).

Of the 1,007 households, 35.8% had children under 18 living with them, 46.7% were married couples living together, 19.3% had a female householder with no husband present, and 28.5% were not families. ABOUT 25.2% of all households were made up of individuals, and 14.8% had someone living alone who was 65 or older. The average household size was 2.81 and the average family size was 3.37.

In the city, the age distribution was 25.9% under 18, 11.5% from 18 to 24, 31.1% from 25 to 44, 16.6% from 45 to 64, and 14.9% who were 65 or older. The median age was 33 years. For every 100 females, there were 122.7 males. For every 100 females 18 and over, there were 130.6 males.

The median income for a household in the city was $25,156 and for a family was $27,206. Males had a median income of $30,446 versus $18,261 for females. The per capita income for the city was $12,243. About 23.1% of families and 27.0% of the population were below the poverty line, including 36.6% of those under 18 and 22.6% of those 65 or over.

== Education ==
Karnes City is served by the Karnes City Independent School District: Karnes City Primary, Roger E. Sides Elementary School, Karnes City Junior High School, and Karnes City High School.

== Climate ==
The climate in this area is characterized by hot, humid summers and generally mild to cool winters. According to the Köppen climate classification, Karnes City has a humid subtropical climate, Cfa on climate maps.

== Notable people ==
- Maria Moreno, farmworker and labor organizer
- Alfred Irving, last person to be freed from slavery in the United States
