= Allium eulae =

Scientific classification
- Kingdom: Plantae
- Clade: Embryophytes
- Clade: Tracheophytes
- Clade: Angiosperms
- Clade: Monocots
- Order: Asparagales
- Family: Amaryllidaceae
- Subfamily: Allioideae
- Genus: Allium
- Species: A. eulae

Binomial name
- Allium eulae Cory ex T.M.Howard

Species of flowering plant

Allium eulae is a species of Allium native to the granite hills of the Texas Highland Lake region in Central Texas. It grows in seepy places and produces creamy white flowers.
