= Greater San Antonio =

Coordinates: 29°25′30″N 98°29′38″W

- Metropolitan statistical area
- San Antonio–New Braunfels, Texas metropolitan statistical area
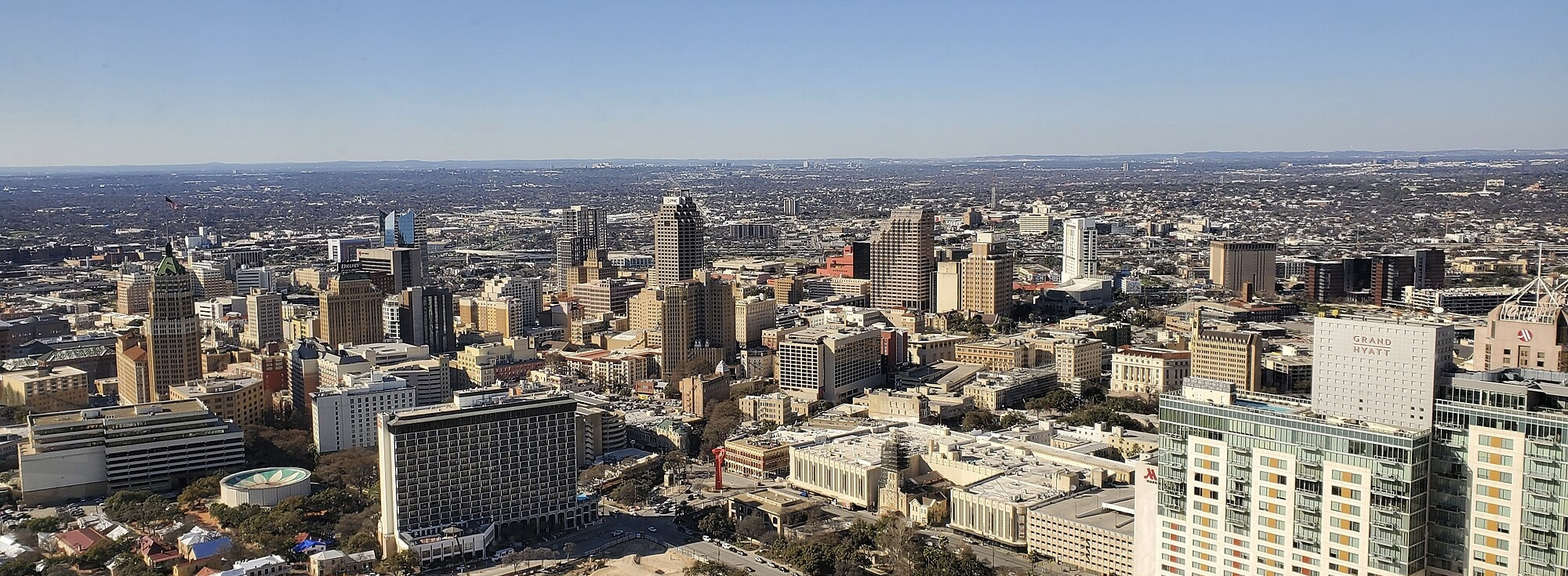
- Downtown San Antonio
San Antonio–New Braunfels–Kerrville, TX CSA
San Antonio–New Braunfels, TX MSA
Kerrville, TX µSA
Fredericksburg, TX µSA
City of San Antonio
City of New Braunfels
City of Kerrville
City of Fredericksburg
- Country: United States
- State: Texas
- Principal cities: San Antonio; New Braunfels; Schertz; Seguin; Cibolo

Area
  - Urban: 597.1 sq mi (1,546 km^{2})
  - MSA: 7,387 sq mi (19,130 km^{2})

Population (2020)
  - Urban: 1,880,707 26th
  - Urban density: 2,944.6/sq mi (1,136.9/km^{2})
  - MSA: 2,558,143 (24th)
  - MSA density: 302.42/sq mi (116.77/km^{2})

GDP
  - MSA: $182.139 billion (2023)
- Time zone: UTC-6 (CST)
  - Summer (DST): UTC-5 (CDT)

Greater San Antonio, officially designated San Antonio–New Braunfels, is an eight-county metropolitan area in the U.S. state of Texas defined by the Office of Management and Budget (OMB). The metropolitan area straddles South Texas and Central Texas and is on the southwestern corner of the Texas Triangle. The official 2020 U.S. census showed the metropolitan area's population at 2,558,143—up from a reported 1,711,103 in 2000—making it the 24th largest metropolitan area in the United States. Downtown Austin and Downtown San Antonio are approximately 80 miles (129 km) apart, and both fall along the Interstate 35 corridor. This combined metropolitan region of San Antonio–Austin has approximately 5.5 million people.

San Antonio–New Braunfels is the third-largest metro area in Texas, after Dallas–Fort Worth–Arlington and Houston–Pasadena–The Woodlands.

== Counties ==
There are eight counties that combine to form Greater San Antonio. The central county is Bexar.

Census area	Estimated population as of 1 July 2025	2020 census	2010 census	2000 census	1990 census
San Antonio–New Braunfels MSA	2,813,140	2,558,143	2,142,508	1,711,703	1,407,745
Atascosa	53,590	48,981	44,911	38,628	30,533
Bandera	22,876	20,851	20,485	17,645	10,562
Bexar	2,160,088	2,009,324	1,714,773	1,392,931	1,185,394
Comal	209,166	161,501	108,472	78,021	51,832
Guadalupe	201,111	172,706	131,533	89,023	64,873
Kendall	53,289	44,279	33,410	23,743	14,589
Medina	56,881	50,748	46,006	39,204	27,312
Wilson	56,139	49,753	42,918	32,408	22,650

The MSA covers a total of 7,387 square miles (19,130 km^{2}), of which 7,340 sq mi (19,000 km^{2}) is land and 47 sq mi (120 km^{2}) is water.

== Communities ==
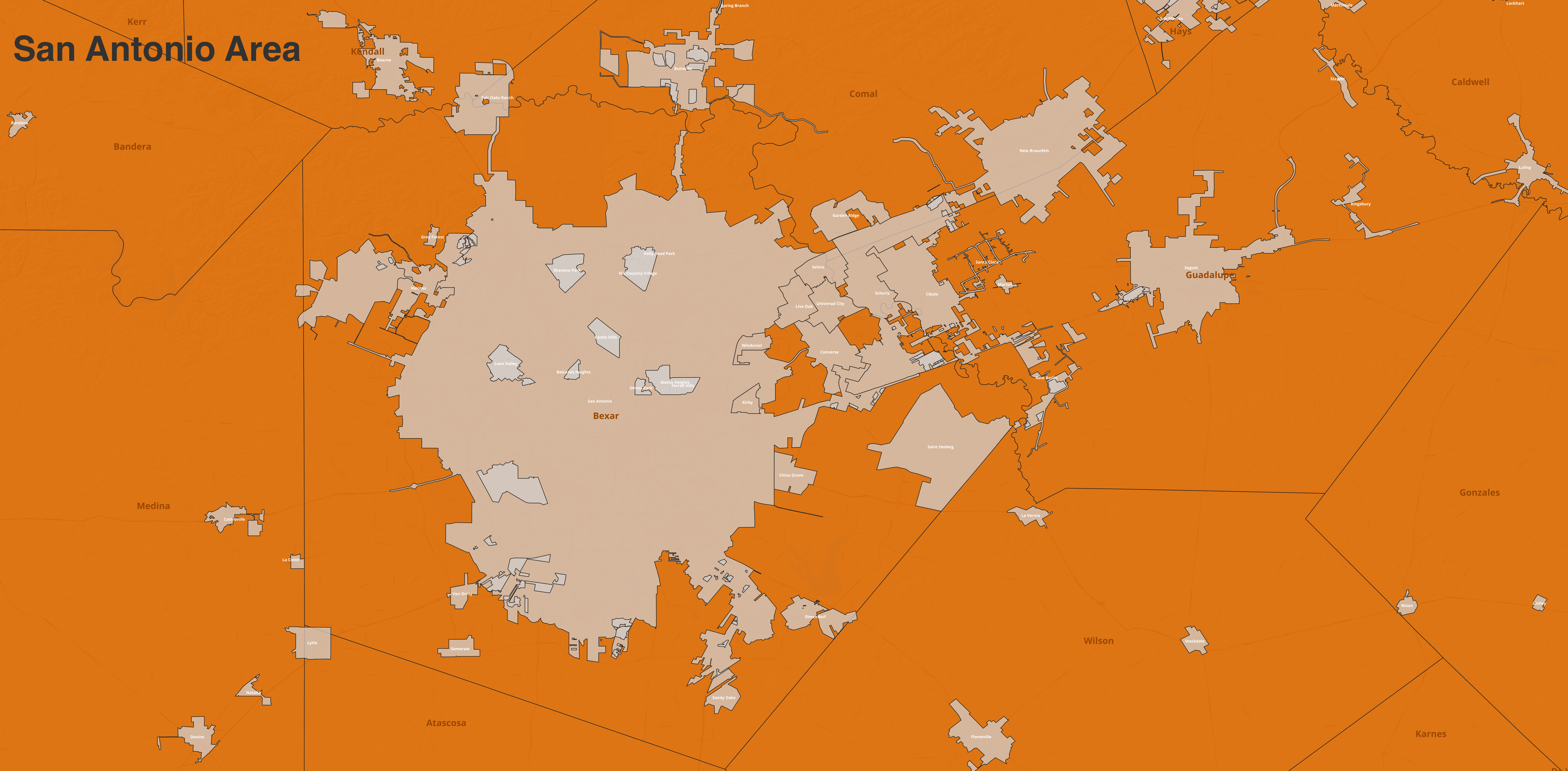
San Antonio Area

Greater San Antonio has a number of communities spread out across several counties and regions. It is centered on the city of San Antonio, the second largest city in Texas, second largest city in the Southern United States, and the seventh largest city in the USA, with roughly 1.5 million residents spread across approximately 500 square miles. Other regions include the Randolph Metrocom and the surrounding counties. The following are cities, towns, and villages categorized based on the United States Census Bureau 2024 population estimates. No population estimates are released for census-designated places (CDPs), which are marked with an asterisk (*). These places are categorized based on their 2020 Census population.

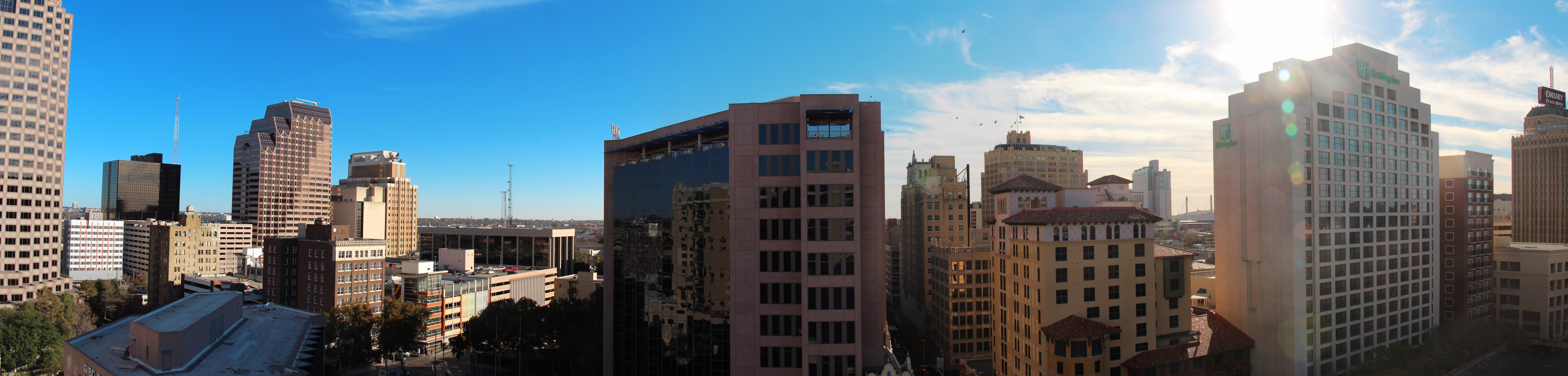
Downtown San Antonio is the urban core of the metropolitan area.

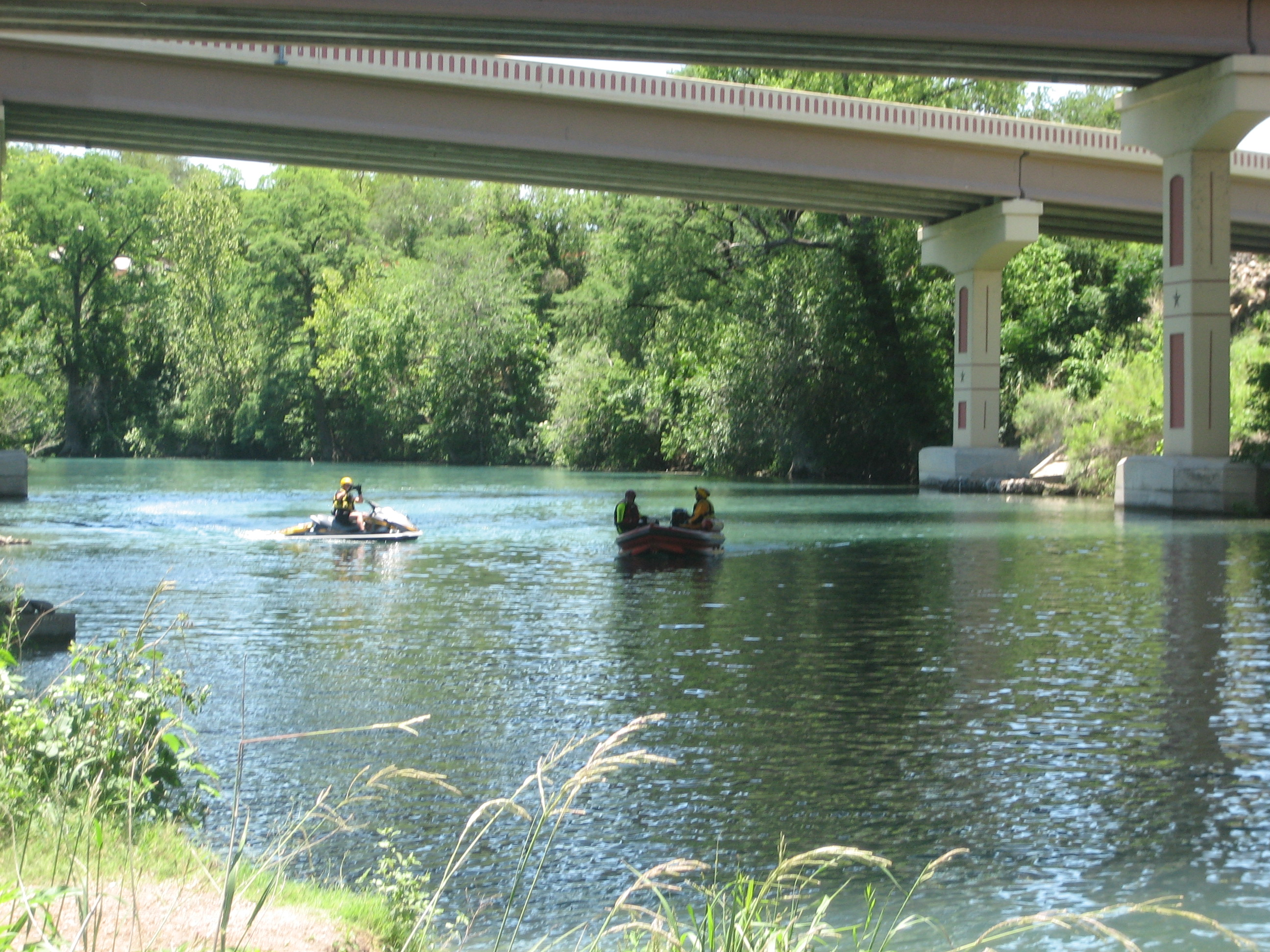
New Braunfels is the second largest city in the metropolitan area and is a satellite of San Antonio.

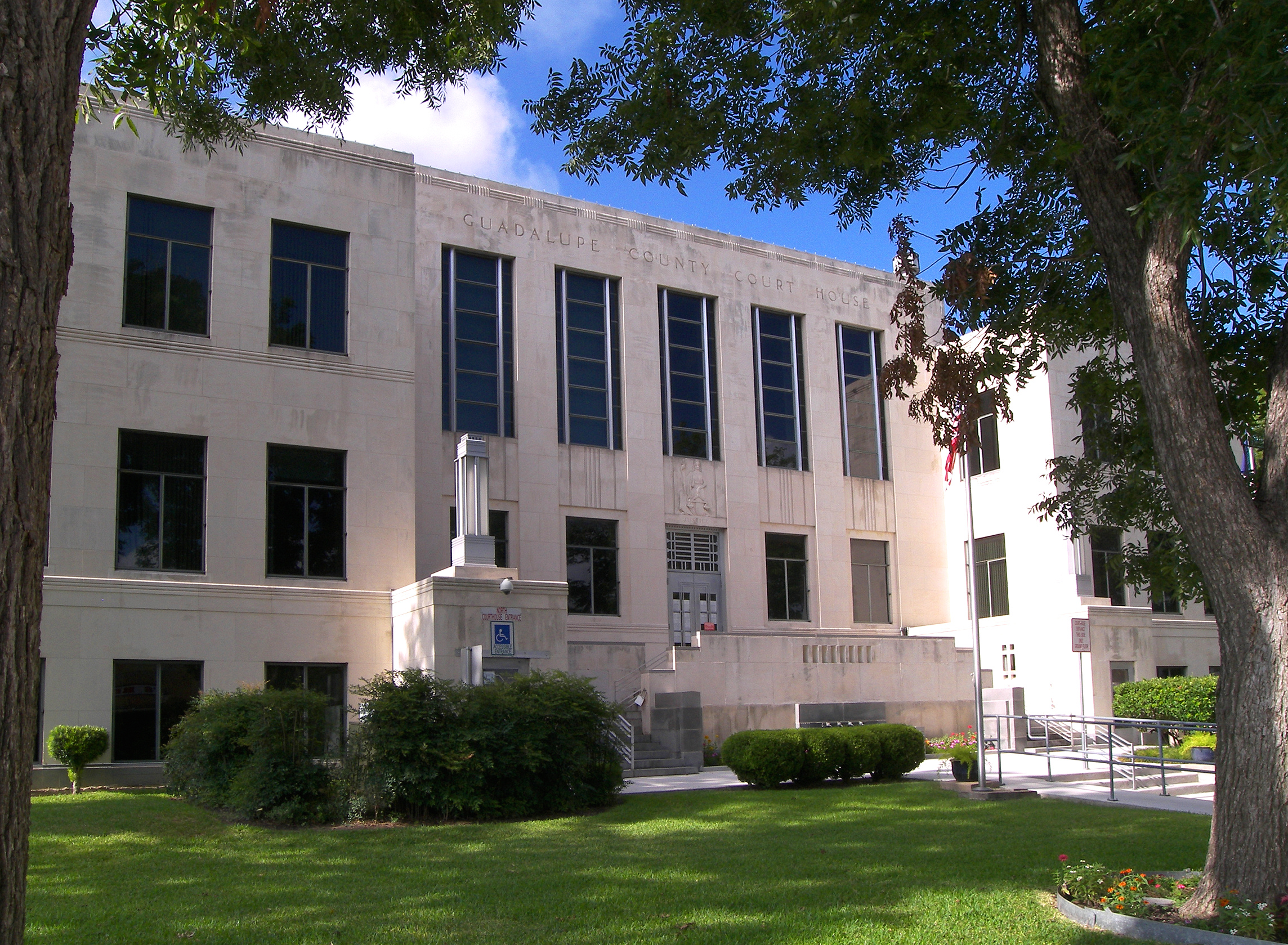
Seguin is the fourth largest city in the metropolitan area and is a satellite of San Antonio.

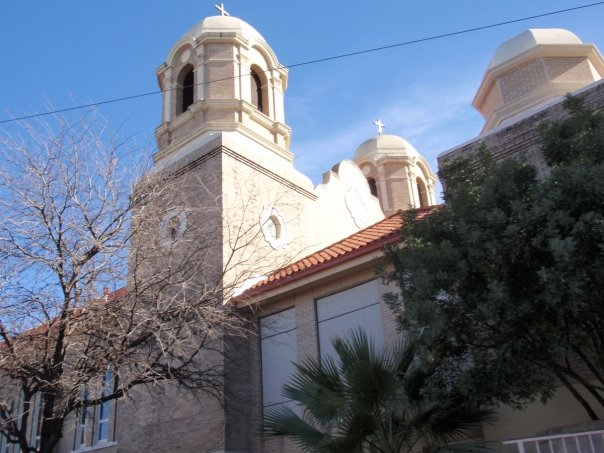
Alamo Heights is an inner-ring suburb of San Antonio. Together with Olmos Park and Terrell Hills, Alamo Heights is a relatively short distance from Fort Sam Houston and uptown, midtown, and downtown San Antonio.

=== Places with more than 1,000,000 people ===
- San Antonio (Principal city) (1,526,656)

=== Places with 100,000 to 1,000,000 people ===
- New Braunfels (Principal city) (116,477)

=== Places with 25,000 to 100,000 people ===
- Canyon Lake* (31,124)
- Cibolo (37,816)
- Converse (31,400)
- Schertz (44,428)
- Seguin (38,789)
- Timberwood Park* (35,217)

=== Places with 10,000 to 25,000 people ===
- Boerne (22,712)
- Fair Oaks Ranch (11,744)
- Helotes (10,223)
- Leon Valley (11,424)
- Live Oak (16,218)
- Pleasanton (11,409)
- Scenic Oaks* (10,458)
- Selma (11,900)
- Universal City (20,267)
- Uvalde (15,589)

=== Places with 5,000 to 10,000 people ===
- Alamo Heights (7,557)
- Bulverde (7,198)
- Floresville (8,738)
- Hondo (8,969)
- Kirby (8,140)
- Lackland AFB* (9,467)
- Lakehills* (5,295)
- Luling (partial) (5,752)
- Sandy Oaks (5,698)
- Terrell Hills (5,142)
- Windcrest (5,782)

=== Places with 1,000 to 5,000 people ===
- Balcones Heights (2,707)
- Castle Hills (3,931)
- Castroville (3,201)
- Charlotte (1,620)
- China Grove (1,138)
- Comfort* (2,211)
- Cross Mountain* (3,944)
- Devine (4,622)
- Elmendorf (2,683)
- Garden Ridge (4,378)
- Geronimo* (1,097)
- Hollywood Park (3,128)
- Jourdanton (4,569)
- LaCoste (1,222)
- La Vernia (1,483)
- Lake Dunlap* (1,981)
- Lytle (3,325)
- Marion (1,098)
- McQueeney* (2,397)
- Natalia (1,356)
- Nixon (partial) (2,389)
- Olmos Park (2,155)
- Poteet (3,005)
- Poth (1,992)
- Randolph AFB* (1,280)
- Redwood* (4,003)
- Shavano Park (3,807)
- Somerset (1,843)
- St. Hedwig (2,377)
- Stockdale (1,488)
- Von Ormy (1,215)

=== Places with fewer than 1,000 people ===
- Bandera (891)
- Christine (365)
- Grey Forest (517)
- Hill Country Village (949)
- Kingsbury (143)
- New Berlin (711)
- Santa Clara (753)
- Spring Branch (254)
- Staples (190)
- Zuehl* (399)

=== Unincorporated places ===
- Adkins
- Amphion
- Atascosa
- Bandera Falls
- Bergheim
- Campbellton
- Carpenter
- D'Hanis
- Dunlay
- Fischer
- Kicaster
- Leesville (partial)
- Leming
- Leon Springs
- Losoya
- Macdona
- Medina
- Mico
- Pearson
- Pandora
- Pipe Creek
- Rio Medina
- Saspamco
- Sayers
- Sutherland Springs
- Tarpley
- Vanderpool
- Waring
- Welfare
- Yancey

== Demographics ==
Historical populations
Census	Pop.	Note	%±
1910	119,676		—
1920	202,096		68.9%
1930	292,533		44.7%
1940	338,176		15.6%
1950	500,460		48.0%
1960	687,151		37.3%
1970	864,014		25.7%
1980	1,071,954		24.1%
1990	1,302,099		21.5%
2000	1,592,383		22.3%
2010	2,142,508		34.5%
2020	2,558,143		19.4%
2024 (est.)	2,763,006		8.0%
U.S. Decennial Census; 1790–1960 1900–1990; 1990–2000

Bexar County is included in the San Antonio–New Braunfels, Texas metropolitan statistical area. It is the 16th-most populous county in the nation and the fourth-most populated in Texas. Bexar County has a large Hispanic population with a significant growing African American population. African Americans make up 7.4% of Bexar County's population up from 6.9% in 2010 and still increasing. With a population that is 59.3% Hispanic as of 2020, it is Texas' most populous majority-Hispanic county and the third-largest such nationwide.

As of the census of 2020, there were 2,558,143 people, 826,094 households, and 558,432 families residing within the MSA. The racial makeup of the MSA was 50.3% white (non-Hispanic white 32.7%), 6.5% African American, 1.1% Native American, 2.7% Asian, 0.1% Pacific Islander, 14% from other races, and 24.4% from two or more races; Hispanic or Latino residents of any race were 54.3% of the population. The median income for a household in the MSA was $40,764 and the median income for a family was $46,686. Males had a median income of $32,143 versus $24,007 for females. The per capita income for the MSA was $18,713.

Racial and ethnic composition of Greater San Antonio
Year	Not Hispanic or Latino								Hispanic or Latino								Total
Year	White	Black or African American	American Indian or Alaska Native	Asian	Native Hawaiian or other Pacific Islander	Other race	Two or more races	Total	White	Black or African American	American Indian or Alaska Native	Asian	Native Hawaiian or other Pacific Islander	Other race	Two or more races	Total	Total
2014	793,403	137,401	4,603	47,580	1,890	2,734	34,259	1,021,870	976,671	7,883	9,937	1,702	724	187,587	32,848	1,217,352	2,239,222
2014	35.4%	6.1%	0.2%	2.1%	0.1%	0.1%	1.5%	45.6%	43.6%	0.4%	0.4%	0.1%	0.0%	8.4%	1.5%	54.4%	100%
2013	783,712	133,710	4,391	45,049	1,947	3,246	31,742	1,003,797	930,034	7,827	11,054	1,915	742	205,365	31,990	1,188,927	2,192,724
2013	35.7%	6.1%	0.2%	2.1%	0.1%	0.1%	1.4%	45.8%	42.4%	0.4%	0.5%	0.1%	0.0%	9.4%	1.5%	54.2%	100%
2012	774,827	130,096	4,521	42,647	1,824	3,176	29,516	986,607	895,545	7,312	10,498	1,891	668	214,555	32,077	1,162,546	2,149,153
2012	36.1%	6.1%	0.2%	2.0%	0.1%	0.1%	1.4%	45.9%	41.7%	0.3%	0.5%	0.1%	0.0%	10.0%	1.5%	54.1%	100%
2011	767,349	128,069	4,666	40,356	1,860	3,178	27,143	972,621	834,874	7,095	10,069	1,832	403	248,054	30,514	1,132,841	2,105,462
2011	36.4%	6.1%	0.2%	2.0%	0.1%	0.2%	1.3%	46.2%	39.7%	0.3%	0.5%	0.1%	0.0%	11.8%	1.5%	53.8%	100%
2010	758,379	125,270	4,828	39,358	1,750	3,430	23,711	956,726	778,780	6,984	8,721	1,659	383	276,645	27,884	1,101,056	2,057,782
2010	36.9%	6.1%	0.2%	2.0%	0.1%	0.2%	1.2%	46.5%	37.8%	0.3%	0.4%	0.1%	0.0%	13.4%	1.4%	53.5%	100%

== Economy ==
San Antonio–New Braunfels is home to five Fortune 1000 companies. Valero Energy Corp, iHeartMedia, USAA, and NuStar Energy are located in San Antonio. Rush Enterprises is located in New Braunfels.

San Antonio is often referred to as "Military City, USA" due to the heavy military presence. Currently, San Antonio is home to the largest concentrations of military bases in the U.S. The following military bases are in the San Antonio area: Lackland Air Force Base, Brooke Army Medical Center, Randolph Air Force Base, and Fort Sam Houston.

== Culture ==
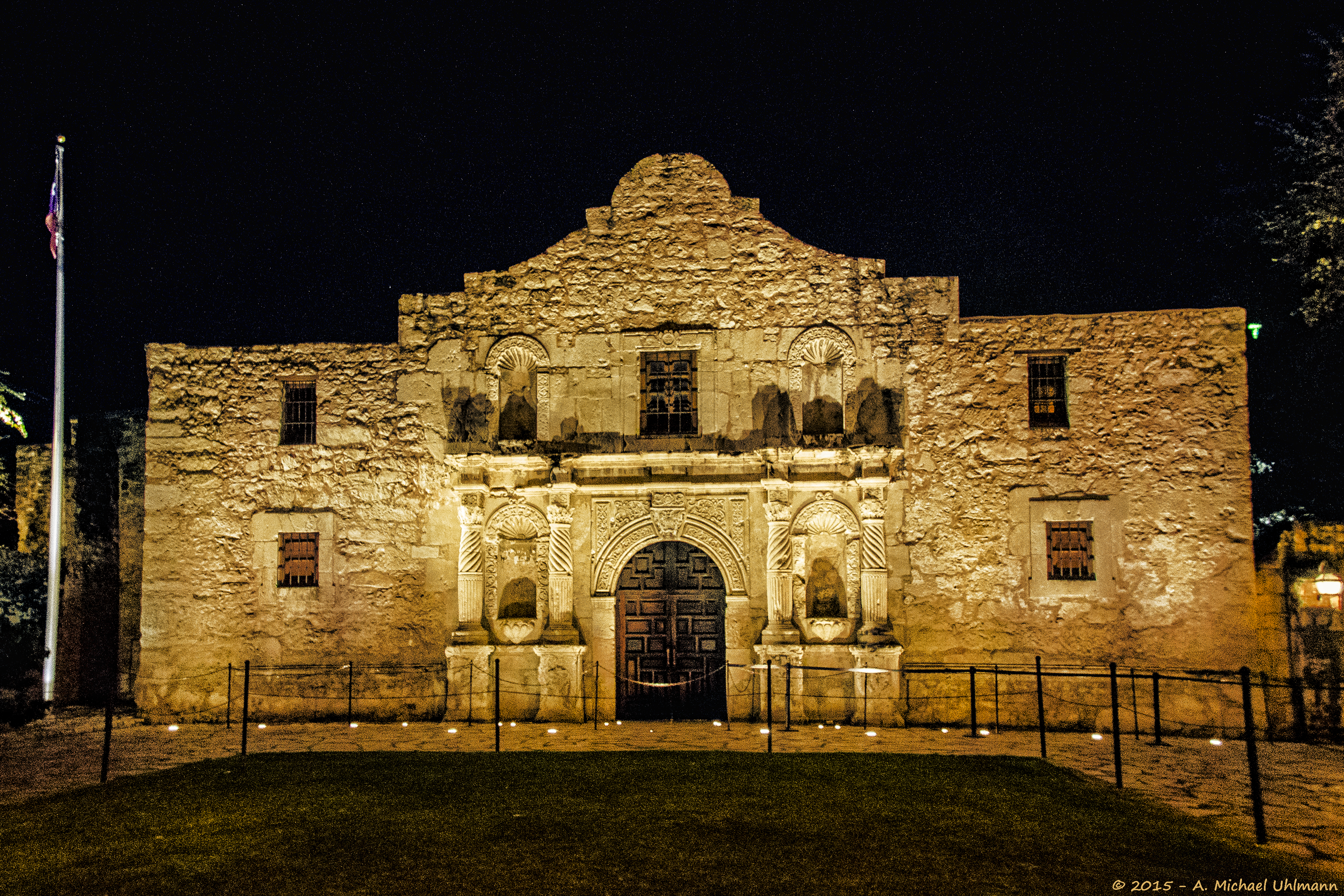
The Alamo

San Antonio enjoys a vibrant culture which it is known for being a popular tourist destination. San Antonio is known as the "Alamo City", due to the Alamo being located near downtown San Antonio. Other major attractions in San Antonio include the following: River Walk, SeaWorld, San Antonio Zoo, San Antonio Aquarium, and Six Flags. New Braunfels is home to a very popular water park known as Schlitterbahn. San Antonio's Spanish influence can be seen in the many historic sites across the city, such as the Alamo Mission, Mission Concepción, San Antonio River Walk, Mission San Francisco de la Espada, and Cathedral of San Fernando (San Antonio). Bandera just 40 miles northwest of San Antonio, hosts a three-day Cowboy Mardi Gras that attracts over 15 thousand people from all over the world to the town of 829 residents.

== Politics ==
Presidential election results
Year	DEM	GOP	Others
2024	46.8% 493,030	52.2% 550,283	1.1% 11,241
2020	50.8% 529,607	47.5% 495,195	1.7% 17,424
2016	42.8% 317,623	51.3% 380,665	5.9% 43,402
2012	45.2% 311,695	53.2% 366,744	1.5% 10,632
2008	47.0% 324,480	52.0% 359,129	1.07% 7428
2004	39.7% 245,309	59.5% 367,271	0.75% 4637
2000	40.9% 216,271	56.3% 298,442	2.8% 14,991
1996	46.2% 210,846	47.5% 216,618	6.3% 28,637
1992	41.8% 211,605	39.3% 198,952	18.9% 95,524
1988	44.7% 202,397	53.8% 243,696	0.74% 3,362
1984	31.8% 118,843	68.0% 254,477	0.20% 738
1980	42.9% 158,412	53.7% 198,049	3.4% 12,575
1976	53.3% 171,295	45.4% 146,009	1.3% 4,136
1972	38.0% 103,190	61.6% 167,509	0.42% 1151
1968	49.8% 109,324	40.4% 88,524	9.8% 21,387
1964	66.7% 128,820	33.1% 63,969	0.22% 429
1960	52.9% 89,169	46.5% 78,247	0.59% 1000

The San Antonio metro area has leaned right in recent decades.

== Sports ==
Professional and major NCAA D1 sports teams (ranked by attendance)
Club	Sport	League	Founded	Venue (capacity)	Attendance	Titles	Championship years
UTSA Roadrunners	American football	NCAA Division I	2011	Alamodome (65,000)	27,576	0	
San Antonio Spurs	Basketball	NBA	1967	Frost Bank Center (18,580)	18,418	5	(Note: 1999, 2003, 2005, 2007, 2014)
San Antonio Missions	Baseball	Texas League	1888	Wolff Stadium (9,200)	8,500	13	(Note: 1897, 1908, 1933, 1950, 1961, 1963, 1964, 1997, 2002, 2003, 2007, 2011, 2013)
San Antonio FC	Soccer	USL Championship	2016	Toyota Field (8,300)	6,765	1	2022
Crossmen Drum and Bugle Corps	Drum Corps	Drum Corps International	1975	Varies		0	

The city of San Antonio is home to only one Major League sports team; the San Antonio Spurs of the NBA. The city's football team is the UTSA Roadrunners who compete at the NCAA FBS level. Multiple minor league teams play in San Antonio, including San Antonio Missions and San Antonio FC.

== Education ==
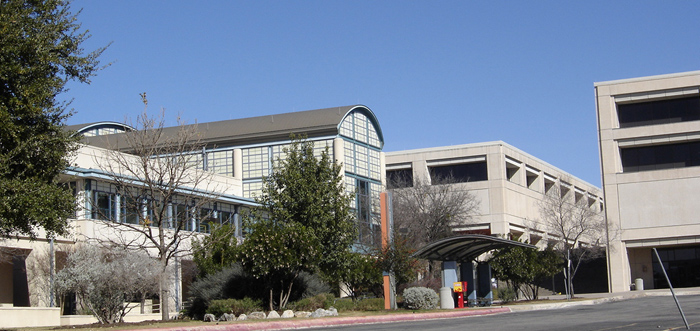
University of Texas at San Antonio

The San Antonio area's largest university is the University of Texas at San Antonio (UTSA). Other public institutions include the University of Texas Health Science Center at San Antonio, Texas A&M University–San Antonio, and the five colleges of the Alamo Community College District.

The city has many private institutions including Our Lady of the Lake University and St. Mary's University on the inner west side. Trinity University and the University of the Incarnate Word are in Midtown. The Culinary Institute of America maintains its third campus in downtown.

Texas Lutheran University in Seguin and Howard Payne University at New Braunfels, now offering classes at a local high school but will soon have a true campus in the Veramendi Development, are the only higher education institutions in the area outside of San Antonio city limits.

The San Antonio area has many public elementary and secondary schools sorted into the following independent school districts:

County	Independent school districts (ISDs)
Atascosa	Charlotte, Jourdanton, Karnes City, Lytle, Pleasanton, Poteet, Somerset
Bandera	Bandera, Medina, Northside, Utopia
Bexar County/City of San Antonio	Alamo Heights, Boerne, Comal, East Central, Edgewood, Fort Sam Houston, Harlandale, Judson, Lackland, Medina Valley, North East, Northside, Randolph Field, San Antonio, Schertz-Cibolo-Universal City, South San Antonio, Southside, Southwest, Somerset
Comal	New Braunfels, Comal, Boerne
Guadalupe	Seguin, Navarro, Comal, New Braunfels, Schertz-Cibolo-Universal City, Marion, San Marcos Consolidated, Nixon-Smiley Consolidated, Prairie Lea, Luling, La Vernia
Kendall	Boerne, Comfort, Blanco, Comal
Medina	Devine, Hondo, Medina Valley, Natalia, Lytle
Wilson	Floresville, La Vernia, Stockdale, Nixon-Smiley Consolidated, Poth, East Central

== Transport ==
The San Antonio International Airport (SAT) is located in uptown San Antonio, approximately eight miles north of downtown. It has two terminals and is served by 21 airlines serving 44 destinations including six in Mexico and one in Canada.

VIA Metropolitan Transit is the metropolitan area's public transportation authority, serving the entire city of San Antonio and many of its suburbs throughout Bexar County.

San Antonio Station serves as the area's Amtrak train station.

Interstate highways

- I-10- West to El Paso, east to Houston
- I-35- North to Austin and the Dallas/Fort Worth area, south to Laredo
- I-37- South to Corpus Christi
- I-410- Inner loop around San Antonio, also passes through the following municipalities: Castle Hills, Balcones Heights, and Leon Valley

Other major highways

- US 87- South to Victoria, north to San Angelo
- US 90- West to Uvalde
- US 181- South to Beeville
- US 281- North to Wichita Falls, south to McAllen
- Loop 1604- Outer loop around San Antonio

== See also ==
- List of cities in Texas
- Texas census statistical areas
- List of Texas metropolitan areas
- Texas Triangle
