= San Antonio–Austin metroplex =

- Conurbation
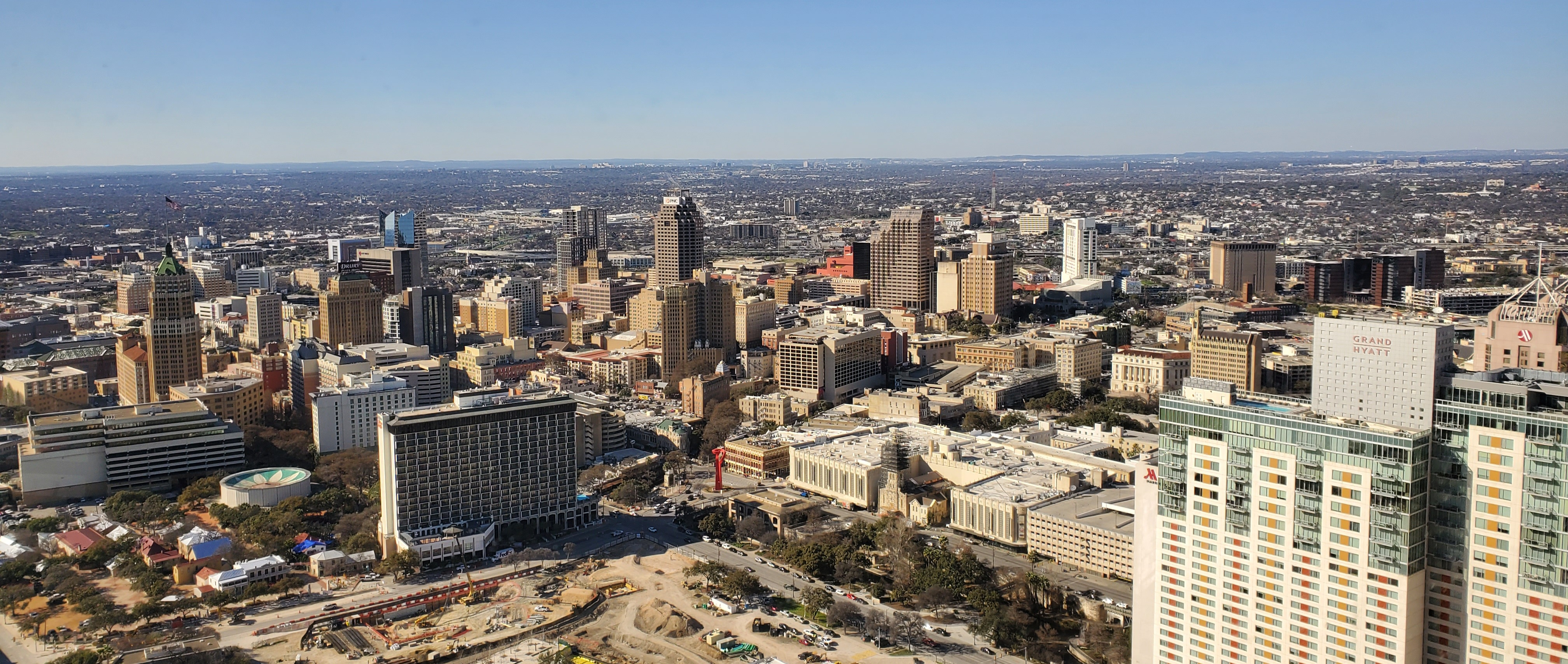
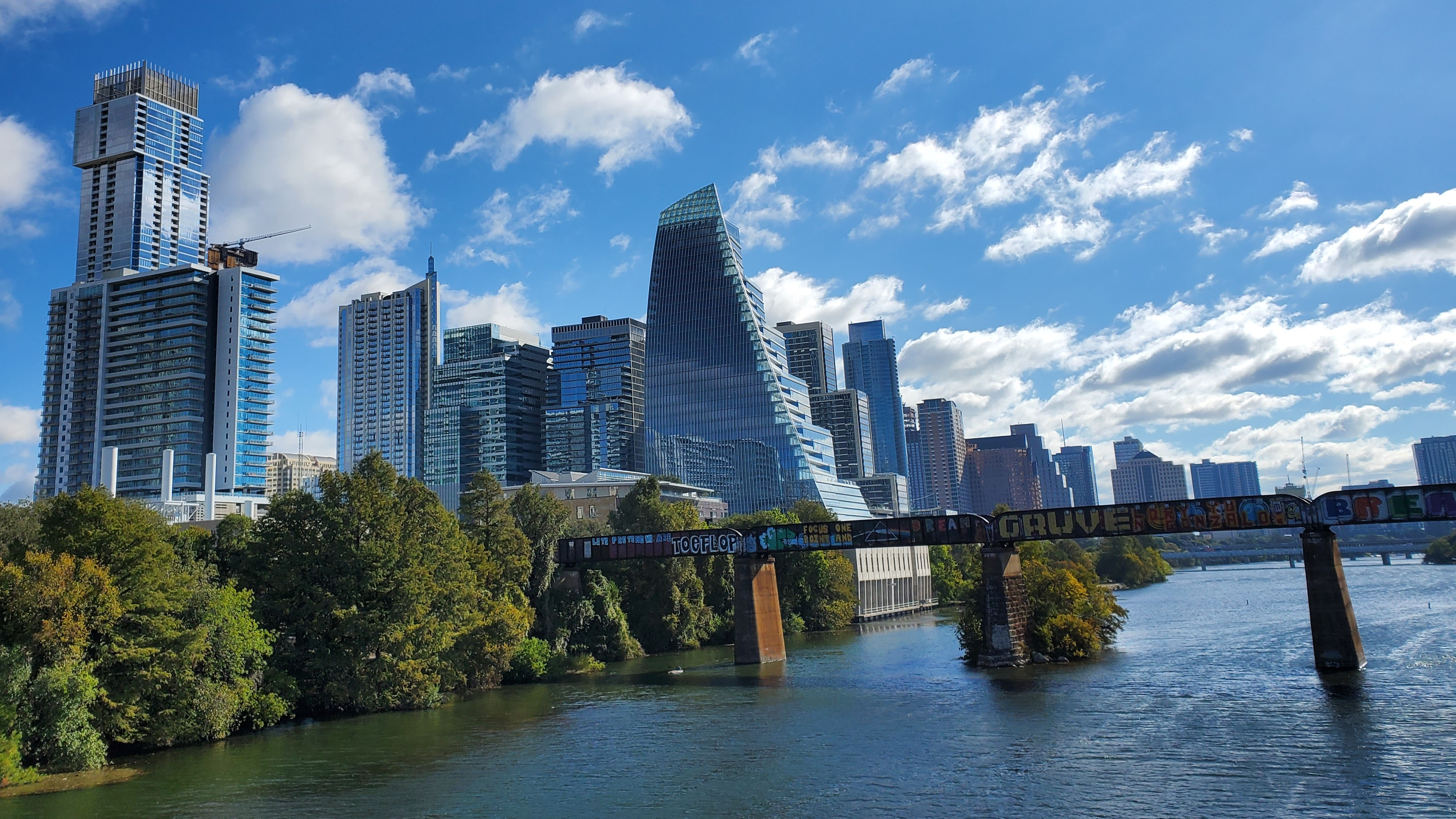
- San Antonio Austin
- Counties in the Greater San Antonio area are marked in red, while those in the Greater Austin area are highlighted in blue.
- Seat: Austin and San Antonio

Area
  - Total: 30,210 km^{2} (11,660 sq mi)

Population (2025)
  - Total: 5.5 million (approximate)

GDP
  - Total: $430.249 billion (2023)
- Time zone: Central Time

The San Antonio–Austin metroplex is a region in the US state of Texas, where the dominant core cities are San Antonio and Austin. This region is composed of the Greater San Antonio and Greater Austin metropolitan areas and has approximately 5.5 million people. Downtown San Antonio and Downtown Austin are about 80 mi (130 km) apart and connected through Interstate 35 (I-35). Several cities and towns that also form part of the San Antonio–Austin metroplex are located along or near I-35 and Texas State Highway 130 (SH 130).

The Greater Austin region comprises five counties: Bastrop, Caldwell, Hays, Travis, and Williamson, collectively hosting a population exceeding 2.6 million people. Conversely, Greater San Antonio encompasses eight counties: Atascosa, Bandera, Bexar, Comal, Guadalupe, Kendall, Medina, and Wilson, collectively hosting a population exceeding 2.8 million people. Discussions regarding connectivity between San Antonio and Austin have been ongoing since 1984 when the Greater Austin-San Antonio Corridor Council was established to promote economic and political unity between the two cities. Census projections estimate that San Antonio–Austin metroplex will experience rapid population growth in the upcoming decades and is positioned to become one of the most populated areas in the entire US by the year 2100.

== Etymology ==
As of 2023, there is no officially designated name for the developing Austin–San Antonio metroplex. The Greater Austin-San Antonio Corridor Council, established in 1984, adopted the nomenclature "Austin–San Antonio." Conversely, alternative sources may refer to it as "San Antonio–Austin." Various nicknames have been proposed by news outlets and social media users for the Austin–San Antonio metroplex. However, none of these monikers have gained significant traction. In 2016, Forbes referred to the region as the "next great American metropolis" and labeled it the "San Antonio–Austin corridor." In 2022, local sources began describing Austin–San Antonio as a "mega-metro".

== History ==
Since 1984, business and political leaders from Austin and San Antonio have convened as part of the Greater Austin-San Antonio Corridor Council. This organization is dedicated to fostering economic and political unity among San Antonio, Austin, and their respective surrounding areas. In 2007, a survey conducted by the San Antonio Business Journal revealed that over half of the respondents expressed the belief that the economies of San Antonio and Austin would merge into a unified market. In 2015, a Texas state demographer, following an analysis of census data in the smaller urban areas situated between Austin and San Antonio, identified the potential emergence of a substantial metropolitan region incorporating both cities, similar to the Dallas–Fort Worth metroplex. This phenomenon was attributed to the growth experienced by smaller towns that were evolving into independent urban cores. Between 2010 and 2015, Austin witnessed a population increase that surpassed the growth observed in Dallas and San Antonio, both of which stand among the top 10 most populated cities in the US.

In 2021, former San Antonio mayor Henry Cisneros published a book titled The Texas Triangle: An Emerging Power in the Global Economy, where he discussed the emerging San Antonio–Austin metroplex. In 2023, the PBS station based in San Antonio premiered a documentary titled San Antonio – Austin: The Emerging Mega-Metro. The documentary featured interviews with the mayors of Austin and San Antonio, alongside other prominent business and political figures. The discussions centered around the emergence of the San Antonio–Austin metroplex. The collective sentiment expressed by those interviewed suggested that the metroplex was "already here", emphasizing the critical need for strategic planning to ensure synergies among the 13 counties comprising the metroplex. The documentary also covers the region's challenges, including water scarcity, transportation, housing, workforce, and environmental impacts.

"We know the area between San Antonio and Austin is growing at a tremendously rapid pace, but what is really happening is the development of a mega-metro that will be one of the biggest economic powerhouses in the world," said the documentary's executive producer in a statement released to the press.

Due to their cultural distinctions, San Antonio and Austin do not function as typical "twin cities." On one hand, San Antonio boasts a larger Hispanic demographic, is older than Austin, has a stronger professional sports culture, and has a substantial presence in the distribution and manufacturing industries. Conversely, Austin has carved out its distinctive identity by excelling in high technology, music, film production, collegiate athletics, higher education, and the arts. Despite their cultural disparities, the cities of San Antonio and Austin have supported each other's growth through collaborative business endeavors through the Greater Austin-San Antonio Corridor Council. Political and business leaders of the Greater Austin-San Antonio Corridor Council have deliberated on various bottlenecks, including constraints in transportation, natural resources (particularly in terms of water supply or lack of more green spaces), and housing affordability.

== Geography ==
Austin is situated in Central Texas, while the San Antonio metro area is positioned between Central and South Texas. Both cities are integral components of the Texas Triangle, a region encompassing the state's five largest cities and housing the majority of its population. The Texas Triangle is defined by the state's four primary urban hubs—Austin, Dallas-Fort Worth, Houston, and San Antonio. Numerous metropolitan and micropolitan statistical regions fall within the confines of the Texas Triangle, including the emerging Austin–San Antonio metroplex. Downtown San Antonio and Downtown Austin are approximately 80 mi (130 km) apart and are connected by the Interstate 35 (I-35) highway corridor.

As of 2023, San Antonio and Austin rank among the top 10 most populated cities in the United States. When accounting for their combined metropolitan regions, which include cities such as Round Rock, San Marcos, and New Braunfels, the San Antonio–Austin metroplex has accumulative population of 5.2 million people. About 3.9 million of them live along the I-35 corridor, in Bexar, Comal, Hays, and Travis Counties. This number surpasses Phoenix–Mesa–Chandler, establishing itself as one of the top 10 most populous metropolitan areas in the United States. According to census projections, the San Antonio–Austin metroplex is anticipated to experience an increase of between 4 million and 7 million people by the year 2030. State demographer Lloyd Potter believes it is likely that the US Census Bureau will include Austin and San Antonio as a combined metropolitan statistical area (MSA) for 2030 census, when the next census is released. By 2050, the population is expected to surpass 8.3 million people. This projected population size would surpass the current populations of both the Dallas–Fort Worth and Greater Houston metro areas.

By the year 2060, Bexar County (Greater San Antonio) is anticipated to surpass a population of 2.6 million, and Travis County (Greater Austin) is projected to exceed 1.7 million. The surrounding counties in the metro area are expected to experience high population growth too. By the year 2100, the area is projected to be among the three most populated metropolitan regions in the entire US.

=== Metropolitan divisions and counties ===
==== Greater Austin divisions ====
The metropolitan statistical area, referred to as Austin–Round Rock–San Marcos or Greater Austin, comprises five (5) counties in the state of Texas, as delineated by the Office of Management and Budget. These counties include Bastrop, Caldwell, Hays, Travis, and Williamson, collectively hosting a population exceeding 2.2 million people. Austin, the capital of Texas, serves as both the county seat and the largest city of Travis County.

Census Area	2020 census	2010 census	2000 census	1990 census
Bastrop	97,216	74,171	57,733	38,263
Caldwell	45,883	38,066	32,194	26,392
Hays	241,067	157,127	97,589	65,614
Travis	1,290,108	1,024,266	812,280	576,407
Williamson	609,017	422,679	249,967	139,551
Greater Austin	2,283,371	1,716,309	1,249,763	846,227

==== Greater San Antonio divisions ====
The metropolitan statistical area, referred to as San Antonio–New Braunfels or Greater San Antonio, comprises eight (8) counties in the state of Texas, as delineated by the Office of Management and Budget. These counties include Atascosa, Bandera, Bexar, Comal, Guadalupe, Kendall, Medina, and Wilson, collectively hosting a population exceeding 2.6 million people. San Antonio is the county seat and largest city of Bexar County.

Census Area	2020 census	2010 census	2000 census	1990 census
Atascosa	48,981	44,911	38,628	30,533
Bandera	20,851	20,485	17,645	10,562
Bexar	2,009,324	1,714,773	1,392,931	1,185,394
Comal	161,501	108,472	78,021	51,832
Guadalupe	172,706	131,533	89,023	64,873
Kendall	44,279	33,410	23,743	14,589
Medina	50,748	46,006	39,204	27,312
Wilson	49,753	42,918	32,408	22,650
Greater San Antonio	2,558,143	2,142,508	1,711,703	1,407,745

== Economy ==
The expansion of the San Antonio–Austin metroplex is largely driven by industrial, residential, and retail developments. The combined gross domestic product (GDP) output is of approximately US$278 billion. Significant growth is evident along the I-35 corridor and the interconnected communities situated between the two cities, particularly the area between New Braunfels (located in the northern part of Greater San Antonio) and San Marcos (situated in the southern part of Greater Austin), the two largest cities between both San Antonio and Austin.

New Braunfels has positioned itself among the fastest-growing cities in the US. As the county seat for Comal County, New Braunfels has witnessed significant population expansion, escalating from slightly under 109,000 residents in 2010 to nearly 157,000 by 2019. This demographic surge has stimulated developments in both commercial and residential sectors within the area. To the north of New Braunfels lies San Marcos, the county seat of Hays County, which similarly experienced substantial job growth throughout the same decade. Between 2008 and 2018, the number of jobs in San Marcos increased by 44%, and its labor force expanded by 45% over the corresponding period. According to state demographers, both San Marcos and New Braunfels are emerging as independent hubs within the San Antonio–Austin metroplex. Several cities and towns along the I-35 corridor possess advantages not found in the core cities of Austin and San Antonio. In San Marcos and New Braunfels, lower property taxes and housing prices serve as incentives for migration to these areas.

Members of the Greater Austin-San Antonio Corridor Council have noted that the suburbs along I-35 are actively preparing for the expected population surge. Their goal is to transition from being mere "bedroom communities" into becoming hubs with their own identity. According to demographers, the growth along the I-35 corridor between Austin and San Antonio is comparable to other "growth corridors," such as the San Jose–San Francisco strip, the Raleigh–Durham area, and the Wasatch Front, which encompasses the Salt Lake City–Provo–Ogden metropolitan area.

Between the years 2000 and 2016, San Antonio maintained a steady trajectory of job growth, demonstrating a rate twice as high as that of New York City and nearly three times more than that of San Francisco and Los Angeles. The sectors experiencing notable job creation included aerospace, cybersecurity, finance, and professional services.

== Transportation ==
The main transportation route connecting the San Antonio–Austin metroplex is I-35 from both north and south. I-35 is recognized as one of the most heavily trafficked highways in Texas and a critical component of both local and regional transportation networks. As of 2023, the stretch of I-35 between San Antonio and Austin witnesses the passage of 100,000 to 150,000 vehicles on a daily basis. A significant portion of these vehicles is occupied by individuals commuting between the two cities on a regular basis. A study conducted by the Capital Area Metropolitan Planning Organization and the Alamo Area Metropolitan Planning Organization projects that by the year 2045, approximately 53% of the population residing between San Antonio and Austin will be situated within a 5 mi (8.0 km) radius of I-35. In addition, the Texas State Highway 130 (SH 130) is a 91 mi (146 km) corridor that serves as an alternate route from I-35 to alleviate traffic congestion between San Antonio and Austin. The two primary hubs situated along this toll highway are Seguin (Greater San Antonio) and Lockhart (Greater Austin).

In 2003, TxDOT initiated the supervision of numerous studies exploring the feasibility of a potential rail line and allocated approximately $28 million for these studies. In 2016, the proposal to establish the Lone Star Rail, a commuter train linking Austin and San Antonio, did not receive approval from the local metropolitan planning organization. Nonetheless, numerous members of the Greater Austin-San Antonio Corridor Council maintain the belief that a commuter train connecting both cities is "necessary and inevitable" for the continued growth and expansion of the metroplex. Supporters of the rail district argued that halting the study and abandoning the rail project would lead to a delay in rail development in the Austin-San Antonio corridor, spanning "at least another generation." Earlier that year, political support for the project collapsed when Union Pacific refused to continue discussions about permitting commuter trains on its existing freight line. This rail line cuts through the central areas of all the pertinent cities in the metro region and had been the subject of study for over two decades.

In 2017, a non-profit organization called the Great Springs Project was formed to protect the Edwards Aquifer and four of its springs that connect through the San Antonio–Austin metroplex. The project's vision involves creating a 100 mi (160 km) network of public hike-and-bike trails.
