= Stockdale High School (Stockdale, Texas) =

Location
- 502 South 4th Street; Stockdale, Texas 78160-6000; United States

Information
- School type: Public high school
- School district: Stockdale Independent School District
- Principal: Cunningham
- Teaching staff: 25.11 (FTE)
- Grades: 9-12
- Enrollment: 274 (2023-2024)
- Student to teacher ratio: 10.91
- Colors: Purple & White
- Athletics conference: UIL Class 3A
- Mascot: Brahma
- Yearbook: The Brahma
- Website: highschool.stockdaleisd.org

Stockdale High School is a public high school located in Stockdale, Texas (USA) and classified as a 3A school by the UIL. It is part of the Stockdale Independent School District located in east central Wilson County. In 2015, the school was rated "Met Standard" by the Texas Education Agency.

== Athletics ==
The Stockdale Brahmas compete in these sports -

- Baseball
- Basketball
- Cross Country
- Football
- Golf
- Powerlifting
- Softball
- Tennis
- Track and Field
- Volleyball

=== State Titles ===
- Volleyball
  - 2024 (3A/D2)
