= Carpenter, Texas =

Unincorporated community in Texas, US

Coordinates: 29°22′42″N 98°11′05″W

Carpenter is a small unincorporated community in western Wilson County, Texas, United States. It lies between the towns of La Vernia and St. Hedwig on Farm to Market Road 1346. The community is part of the San Antonio Metropolitan Statistical Area.

== History ==
Carpenter was named for a local land owner when founded in 1893 as a stop on the San Antonio and Mexican Gulf Railroad. In the early 1900s, the community had a cotton gin, general store and post office, with Joseph Winkler as the postmaster, but the post office was discontinued in 1928. The town steadily declined after the rail line was closed and today only a small cluster of homes remain.
