= Dewees, Texas =

Coordinates: 29°01′14″N 98°10′20″W

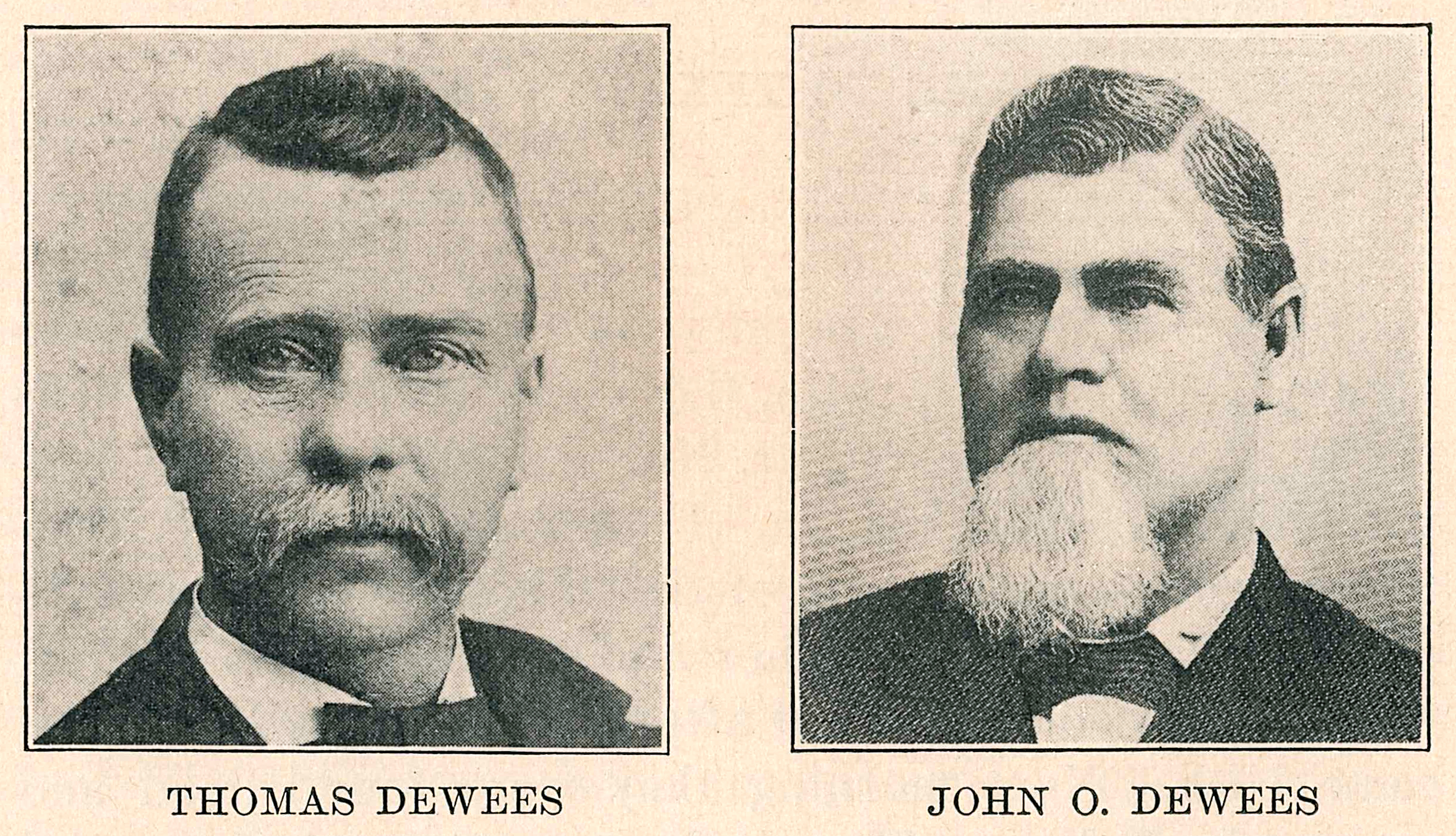
Thomas Dewees (1843–1905) and John O. Dewees (1828–1899), Texas cattlemen, co-founders of Dewees

Dewees is a ghost town in Wilson County, Texas, United States, a few miles southwest of Poth. The town was founded at the end of the Civil War by the brothers John Oatman Dewees and Thomas Dewees, who became very successful cattlemen, delivering tens of thousands of Texas Longhorn cattle annually from their ranching operations in the area.

== School, store, and gin ==
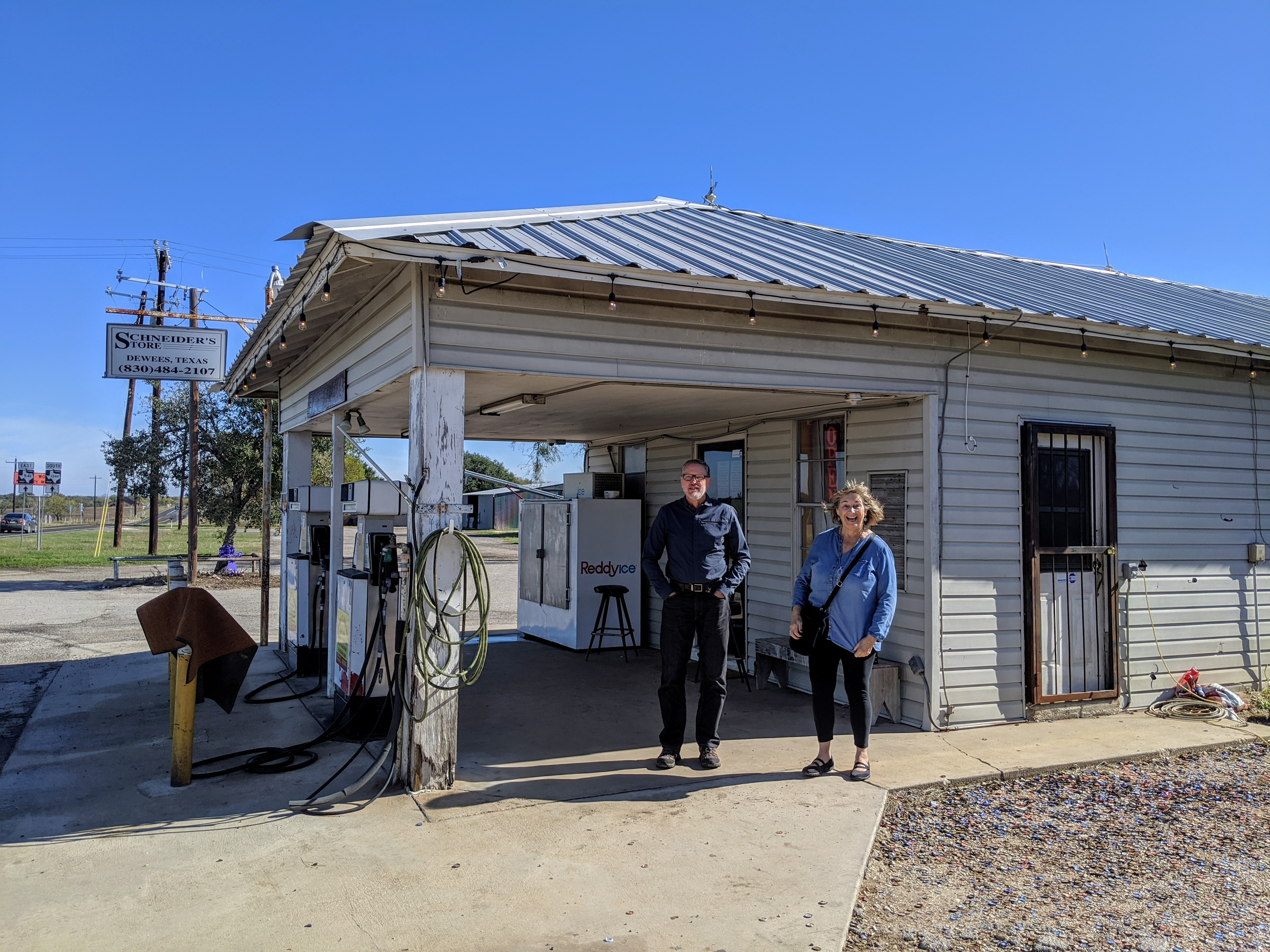
Schneider's Store in Dewees, with visitors, in 2019

Dewees had a school for many years, but there are no visible remains of it. Schneider's Store, on the other hand, remains in operation, for over 85 years (since 1932), and there are a few houses near it.

The store's owner for its first 65 years, "Aunt Helen" Schneider, had a poodle that would start barking at customers at closing time. As of 1998, she had 30 nieces, 17 nephews, 61 great-nieces, 65 great-nephews, 184 great-great-nieces and -nephews, and 37 great-great-great-nieces and -nephews, making a total of 394 people who might properly call her "Aunt Helen".

Alfred and Helen Schneider also operated a cotton gin and Hereford ranching operation until Alfred died in 1967.

== Dewees Remschel House ==
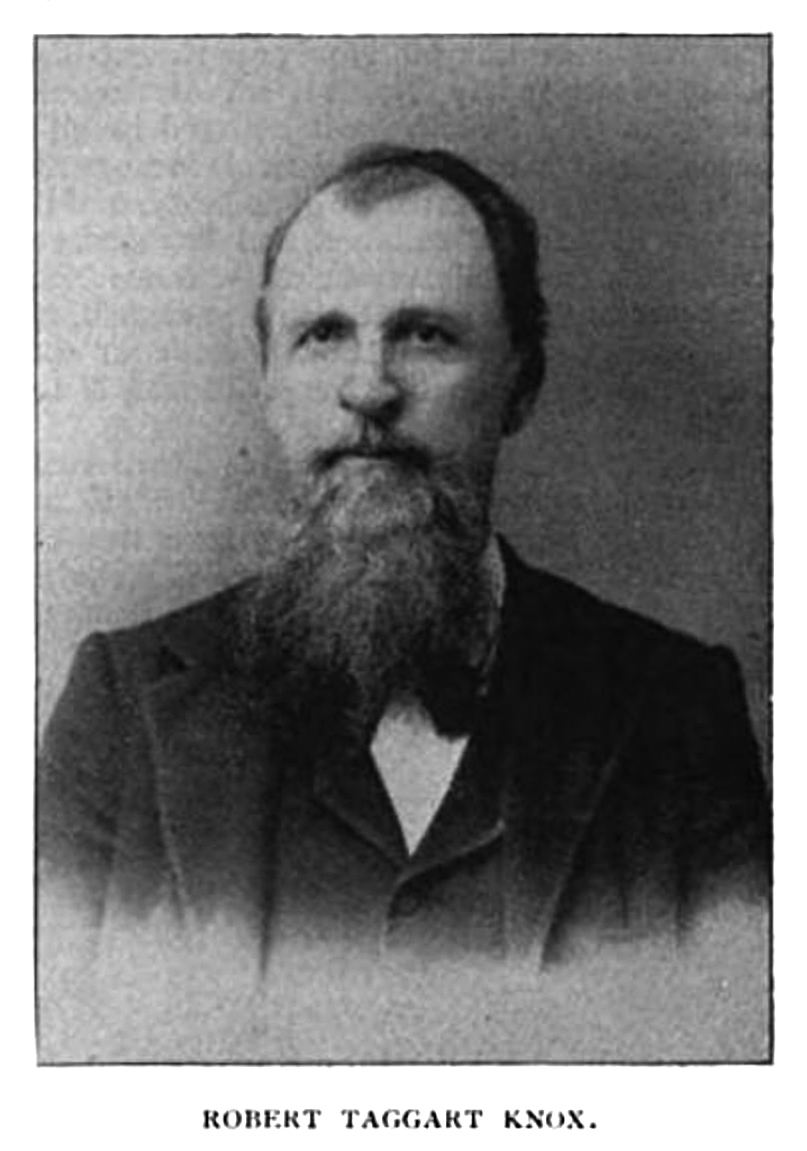
Dr. Robert Taggert Knox (1832–1898) of Gonzales, Texas, built the Dewees Remschel House in Gonzales in the late 1860s.

The Dewees Remschel House is a historic mansion that was originally in Gonzales, Texas, where it was built by Dr. Robert Taggart Knox, sometime in the late 1860s. The house was moved by its owner Claribel Dewees Remschel to her 130-acre ranch near Dewees (at FM 541 and CR 206) in 1983, and was renovated over the next 15 years. It now belongs to the Wilson County Historical Society and operates as a museum and event venue.
