= Saspamco, Texas =

Saspamco
- Unincorporated community
- Location within Texas
- Coordinates: 29°14′04″N 98°17′45″W
- Country: United States
- State: Texas
- County: Wilson County
- Elevation: 479 ft (146 m)

Population (2000)
  - Total: 443
- Time zone: UTC-06 (CST)
  - Summer (DST): UTC-05 (CDT)
- ZIP code: 78112
- GNIS feature ID: 1367786

Saspamco is an unincorporated community in Wilson County, Texas, United States. It is situated approximately 11 miles northwest of Floresville. According to the Handbook of Texas, the community had an estimated population of 443 in 2000.

Saspamco was named after the San Antonio Sewer Pipe Manufacturing Company which began operations around 1901 using the red clay of the area to manufacture tile products.

Saspamco is part of the San Antonio Metropolitan Statistical Area.

== History ==
A post office was opened in 1901, as well as a loading switch with the San Antonio and Aransas Pass Railway. By 1915, the town boasted a population of 125 people as well as two churches, one Catholic and one Baptist. The town enjoyed its heyday in the 1930s, when the Saspamco plant by the same name could produce 120 tons of sewer pipe a day.

In 1917, the State of Texas' special legislature granted funds for the now-defunct Saspamco Independent School District to purchase lands in Bexar County to expand its school system.

By the 1960s, most of the businesses in Saspamco closed, although the pipe company continued operations for a number of years thereafter. Clay pipe was on the decline, as steel pipe and eventually PVC pipe greatly reduced the demand for the heavy and less reliable clay pipe manufactured in the town.

In the mid-1980s, Tyson Foods opened a large poultry hatchery nearby, though this was only open for about 10 years before the facility was relocated elsewhere.

For a number of years, from the late 1960s until the early 1980s, the quarry left from the brick manufacturing plant was used as a landfill by a private owner who used to charge nominal fees for garbage companies to dump their waste there. In the 1980s, the former TNRCC (now called the TCEQ) closed the facility as a landfill because of a lack of a landfill permit, and not having adequate drainage facilities. During this era, the area saw an explosion of both the rodent and the rattlesnake populations. Since then, these populations have returned to normal levels.

== Geography ==
Soil composition primarily sandy loam as cited by the United States Department of Agriculture in its Soil Conservation Service.

== Economy ==
The economy is largely agricultural based. This area is known for its peanut farming as well as grazing land for cattle.

== Sister cities ==
- China Grove, Texas
- Nameless, Texas
- Oatmeal, Texas
