= Stockdale, Texas =

- City
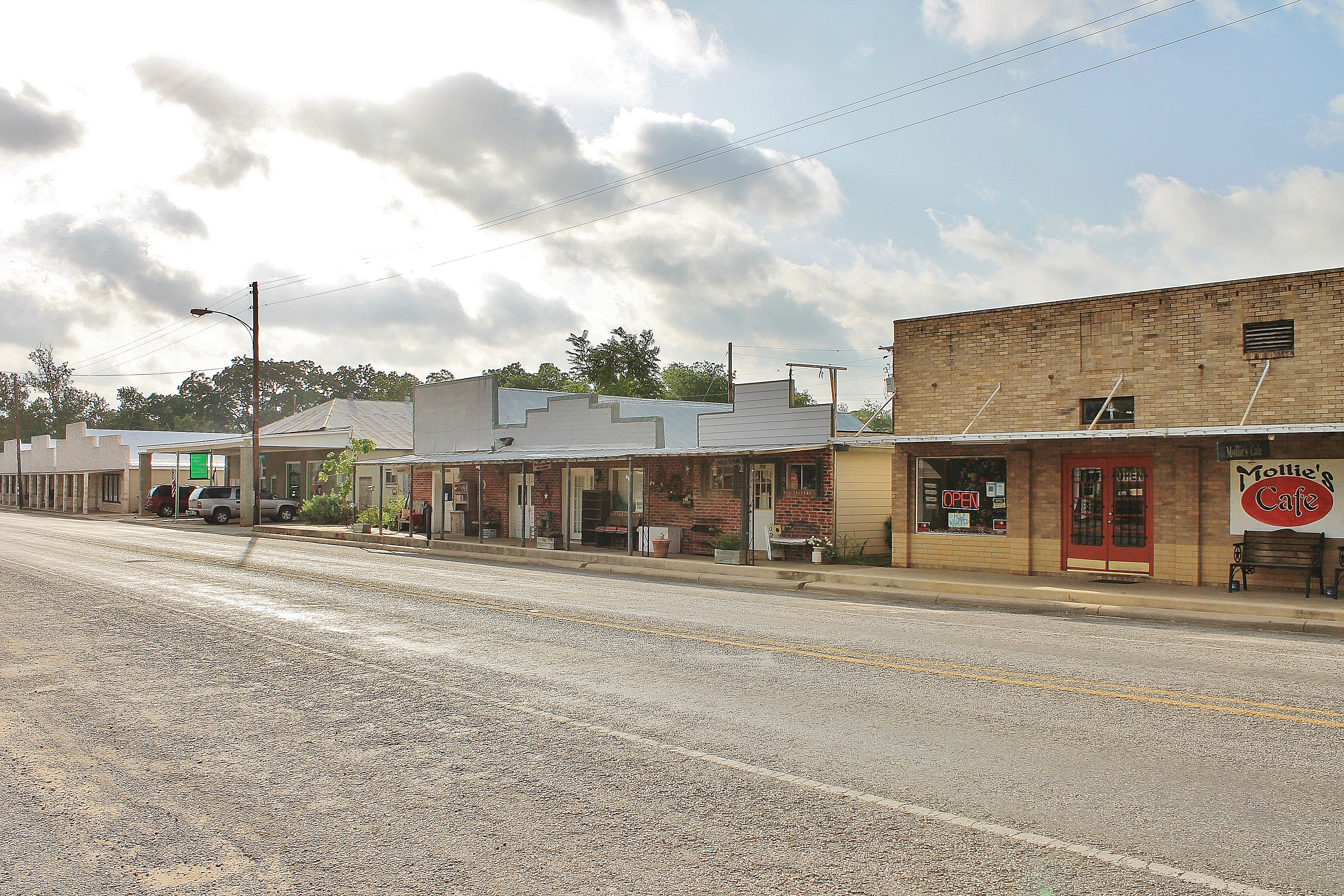
- Motto: "Home of the Watermelon Jubilee"
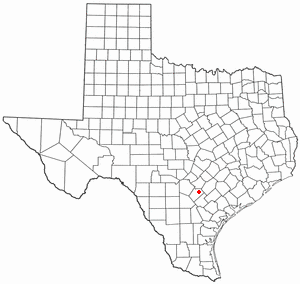
- Location of Stockdale, Texas

- Coordinates: 29°14′40″N 97°57′52″W
- Country: United States
- State: Texas
- County: Wilson

Area
  - Total: 1.69 sq mi (4.37 km^{2})
  - Land: 1.69 sq mi (4.37 km^{2})
  - Water: 0 sq mi (0.00 km^{2})
- Elevation: 427 ft (130 m)

Population (2020)
  - Total: 1,413
  - Density: 977.2/sq mi (377.29/km^{2})
- Time zone: UTC-6 (Central (CST))
  - Summer (DST): UTC-5 (CDT)
- ZIP code: 78160
- Area code: 830
- FIPS code: 48-70376
- GNIS feature ID: 2411986
- Website: Stockdale, Texas

Stockdale is a city in Wilson County, Texas, United States. The population was 1,413 at the 2020 census. It is part of the San Antonio Metropolitan Statistical Area. The town was named for Fletcher S. Stockdale, lieutenant governor when the town was established in 1863. Stockdale was settled by German and Polish immigrants in the late 1800s which caused its population to boom.

== History ==
Previously an area named High Prairie, Free Timber and Bunker's Store, Stockdale was named after Fletcher Stockdale, the lieutenant governor of Texas, when the town was established in 1863. In 1898 the San Antonio and Mexican Gulf Railroad reached Stockdale. The town was incorporated in 1919, and Stockdale's annual Watermelon Jubilee began in 1937.

== Geography ==
Stockdale has a total area of 1.7 square miles (4.4 km^{2}), all land. It is 25 mi (40 km) south of Seguin and 40 mi (64 km) southeast of downtown San Antonio.

=== Climate ===
The climate in this area is characterized by hot, humid summers and generally mild to cool winters. According to the Köppen climate classification system, Stockdale has a humid subtropical climate, Cfa on climate maps.

== Demographics ==
Historical population
Census	Pop.	Note	%±
1880	97		—
1930	696		—
1940	926		33.0%
1950	1,105		19.3%
1960	1,111		0.5%
1970	1,132		1.9%
1980	1,265		11.7%
1990	1,268		0.2%
2000	1,398		10.3%
2010	1,442		3.1%
2020	1,413		−2.0%
U.S. Decennial Census

=== 2020 census ===
As of the 2020 census, Stockdale had a population of 1,413. The median age was 34.8 years. 28.2% of residents were under the age of 18 and 15.6% of residents were 65 years of age or older. For every 100 females there were 99.9 males, and for every 100 females age 18 and over there were 101.6 males age 18 and over.

0.0% of residents lived in urban areas, while 100.0% lived in rural areas.

There were 488 households in Stockdale, of which 40.2% had children under the age of 18 living in them. Of all households, 46.7% were married-couple households, 19.9% were households with a male householder and no spouse or partner present, and 28.5% were households with a female householder and no spouse or partner present. About 25.7% of all households were made up of individuals and 13.5% had someone living alone who was 65 years of age or older.

There were 571 housing units, of which 14.5% were vacant. The homeowner vacancy rate was 2.9% and the rental vacancy rate was 12.5%.

Racial composition as of the 2020 census
Race	Number	Percent
White	884	62.6%
Black or African American	18	1.3%
American Indian and Alaska Native	9	0.6%
Asian	5	0.4%
Native Hawaiian and Other Pacific Islander	0	0.0%
Some other race	177	12.5%
Two or more races	320	22.6%
Hispanic or Latino (of any race)	756	53.5%

=== 2000 census ===
As of the census of 2000, 1,398 people, 497 households, and 337 families resided in the city. The population density was 865.3 inhabitants per square mile (334.1/km^{2}). The 556 housing units averaged 344.2/sq mi (132.5/km^{2}). The racial makeup of the city was 74.54% White, 2.36% African American, 0.21% Native American, 0.14% Asian, 21.03% from other races, and 1.72% from two or more races. Hispanics or Latinos of any race were 45.99% of the population.

Of the 497 households, 34.0% had children under the age of 18 living with them, 53.3% were married couples living together, 10.3% had a female householder with no husband present, and 32.0% were not families. About 28.4% of all households were made up of individuals, and 16.1% had someone living alone who was 65 years of age or older. The average household size was 2.68 and the average family size was 3.33.

In the city, the population was distributed as 26.5% under the age of 18, 8.5% from 18 to 24, 25.6% from 25 to 44, 20.2% from 45 to 64, and 19.2% who were 65 years of age or older. The median age was 37 years. For every 100 females, there were 93.4 males. For every 100 females age 18 and over, there were 86.9 males.

The median income for a household in the city was $30,337, and for a family was $39,667. Males had a median income of $29,583 versus $20,395 for females. The per capita income for the city was $15,102. About 10.8% of families and 14.5% of the population were below the poverty line, including 15.5% of those under age 18 and 20.9% of those age 65 or over.

== Education ==
The City of Stockdale is served by the Stockdale Independent School District and home to the Stockdale High School Brahmas.
