= Grass Pond Colony, Texas =

Coordinates: 29°15′05″N 98°07′46″W

Grass Pond Colony was located at the site of several large natural ponds which remain filled by water year-round due to natural springs. It is located in the northern part of Wilson County, Texas, United States, approximately five miles south of Sutherland Springs.

== Sources ==
- "The Good Old Days: a history of LaVernia" by the Civic Government class of LaVernia High School, 1936–1937 school year."
- "Wilson County Centennial 1860-1960" By the Wilson county library, Centennial program handed out at The 100yr centennial celebration."
- "Segregated schools of Wilson County" Floresville Chronicle Journal May 20, 1971.
- "African Americans in Wilson County Texas", Jamie L. Harris, Lynbrook Books, 2006.
- "Wilson County History", Diane Jimenez, Taylor Publishing Co. 1990

== See also ==
- Doseido Colony, Texas
