= Doseido Colony, Texas =

Coordinates: 29.335°N 98.159°W

Doseido Colony was a small historic settlement which was located in western Wilson County, Texas, United States, one mile north of FM 775, at the intersection of county roads 321 and 361.

== See also ==
- Grass Pond Colony, Texas

== Sources ==
- "The Good Old Days: a history of LaVernia" by the Civic Government class of LaVernia High School, 1936–1937 school year."
- "Wilson County Centennial 1860-1960" By the Wilson county library, Centennial program handed out at The 100yr centennial celebration."
- "Segregated schools of Wilson County" Floresville Chronicle Journal May 20, 1971.
- "African Americans in Wilson County Texas", Jamie L. Harris, Lynbrook Books, 2006.
- "Wilson County History", Diane Jimenez, Taylor Publishing Co. 1990
