= Central Texas =

Geographic region

- Region
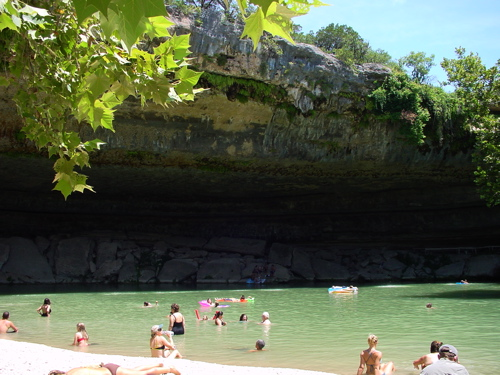
- Hamilton Pool Preserve - one of the many lush areas in Central Texas

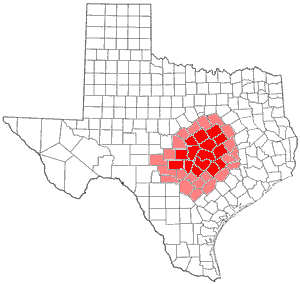
- Central Texas counties in red; counties sometimes included in Central Texas in pink
- Country: United States
- State: Texas

Central Texas is a region in the U.S. state of Texas roughly bordered on the west by San Saba, to the southeast by Bryan-College Station, the south by San Marcos and to the north by Hillsboro. Central Texas overlaps with and includes part of the Texas Hill Country and corresponds to a physiographic section designation within the Edwards Plateau, in a geographic context.

Central Texas includes the metropolitan areas of: Killeen-Temple, Bryan–College Station, Waco and Austin–Round Rock (also part of the Capital region). The Austin–Round Rock and Killeen-Temple-Fort Hood areas are among the fastest-growing metropolitan areas in the state. In the south, the Greater Austin and Greater San Antonio areas are separated from each other by approximately 80 miles (129 km) along I-35. It is anticipated that both regions may form a new metroplex similar to Dallas-Fort Worth. The largest U.S. Army installation in the country, Fort Hood, is located near Killeen.

== Composition ==
The counties (to the right in red) that are almost always included in the Central Texas region are (those bolded below are always part of Central Texas):

- Bastrop
- **Bell**
- Blanco
- Burnet
- **Coryell**
- Gillespie
- Hays
- **Lampasas**
- Lee
- Llano
- **Falls**
- **McLennan**
- **Milam**
- **Travis**
- **Williamson**

Counties (to the right in pink) that are sometimes included in the Central Texas region are:

- Bandera
- Bexar
- Bosque
- Brazos
- Burleson
- Caldwell
- Comal
- Comanche
- Fayette
- Freestone
- Gonzales
- Guadalupe
- Hamilton
- Hill
- Kerr
- Kendall
- Kimble
- Leon
- Limestone
- Madison
- Mason
- Mills
- Robertson
- San Saba
- Washington
- Wilson

== Gallery ==
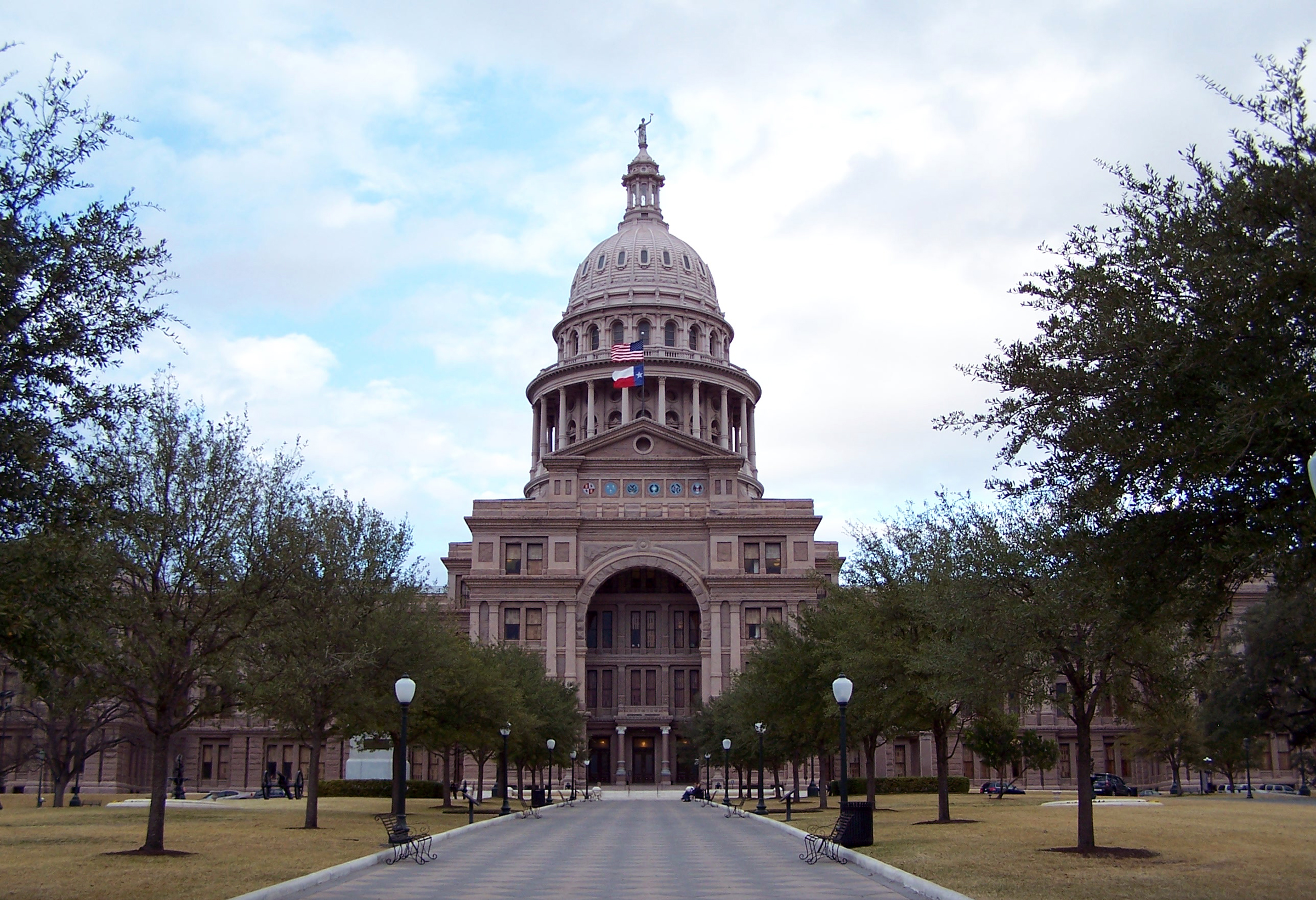
The Texas Capital - Austin

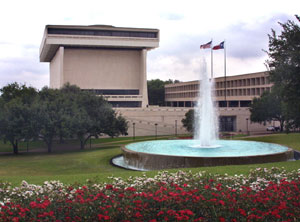
Lyndon B. Johnson Presidential Library - Austin

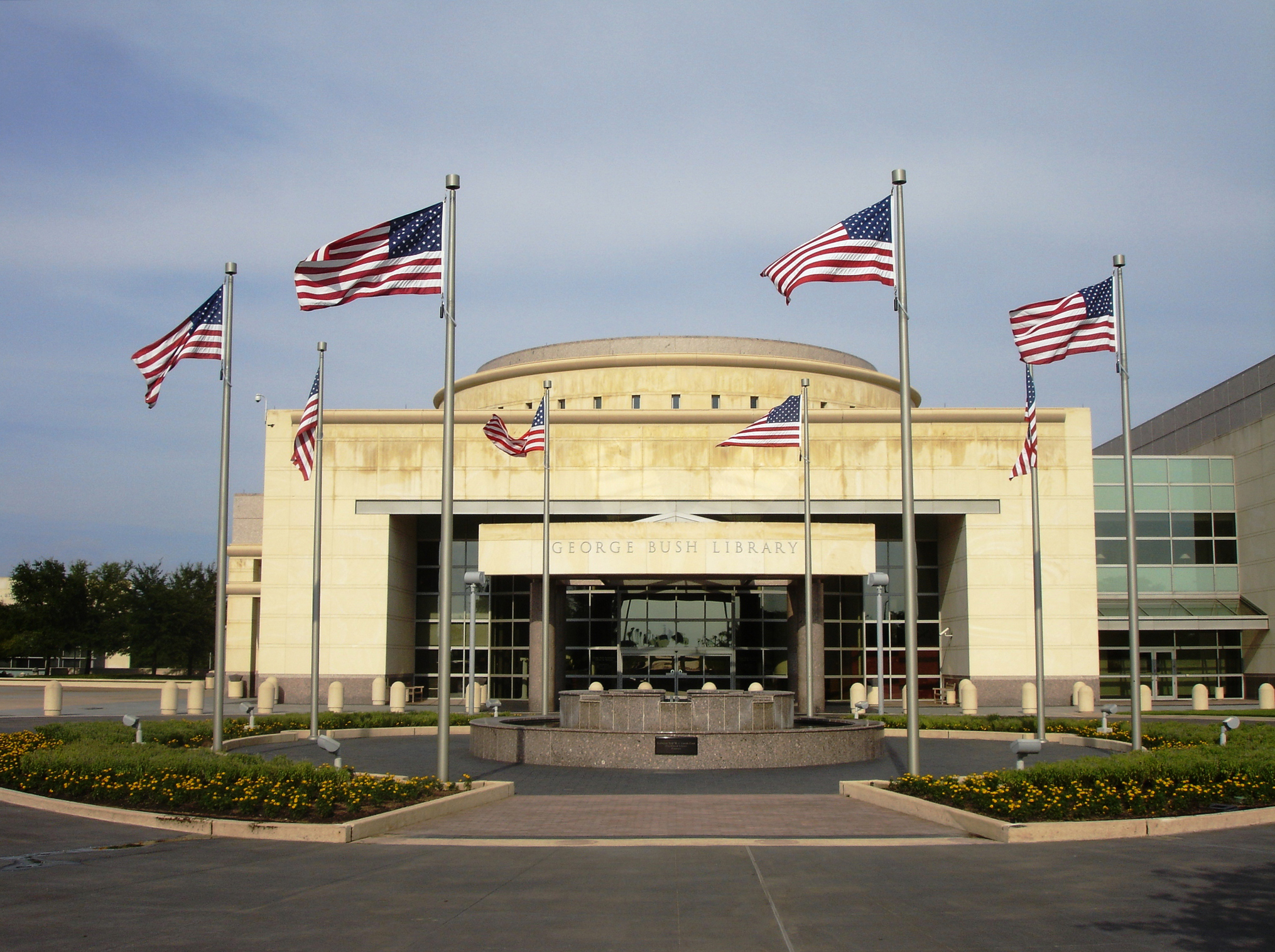
George H.W. Bush Presidential Library - College Station

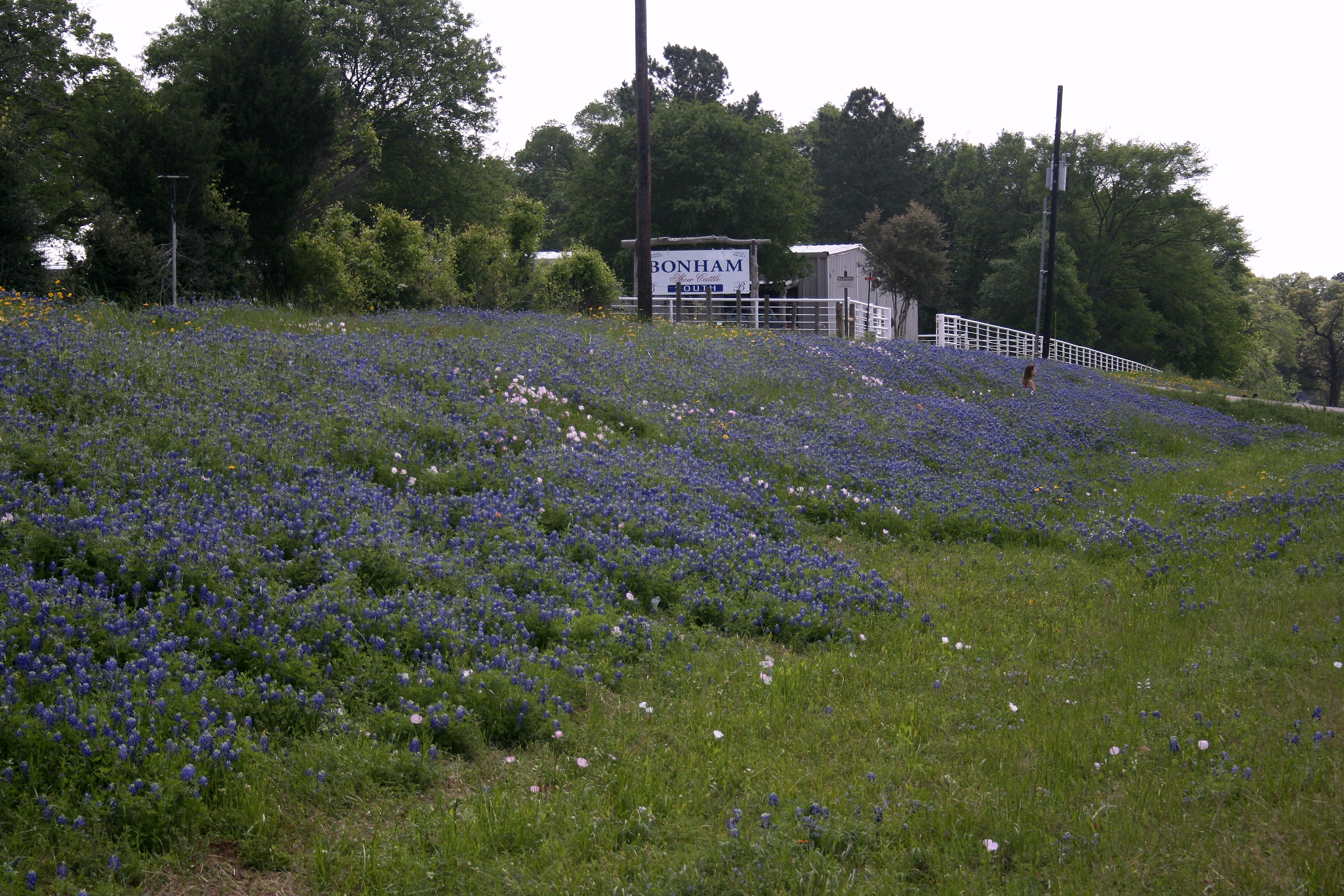
Bluebonnets on Hwy-6 near College Station

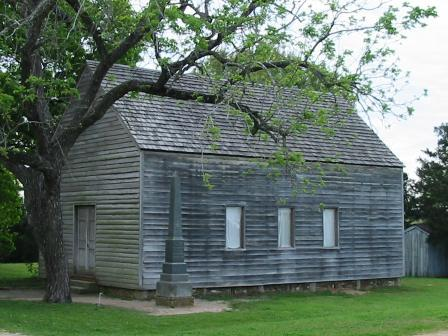
Washington-on-the-Brazos, where the Texas Declaration was signed. - Washington County

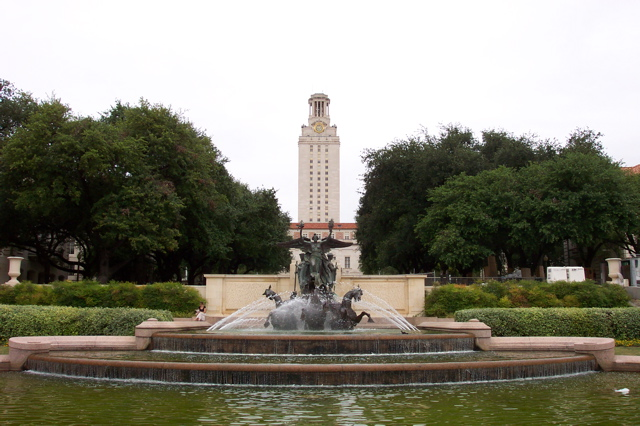
The University of Texas at Austin

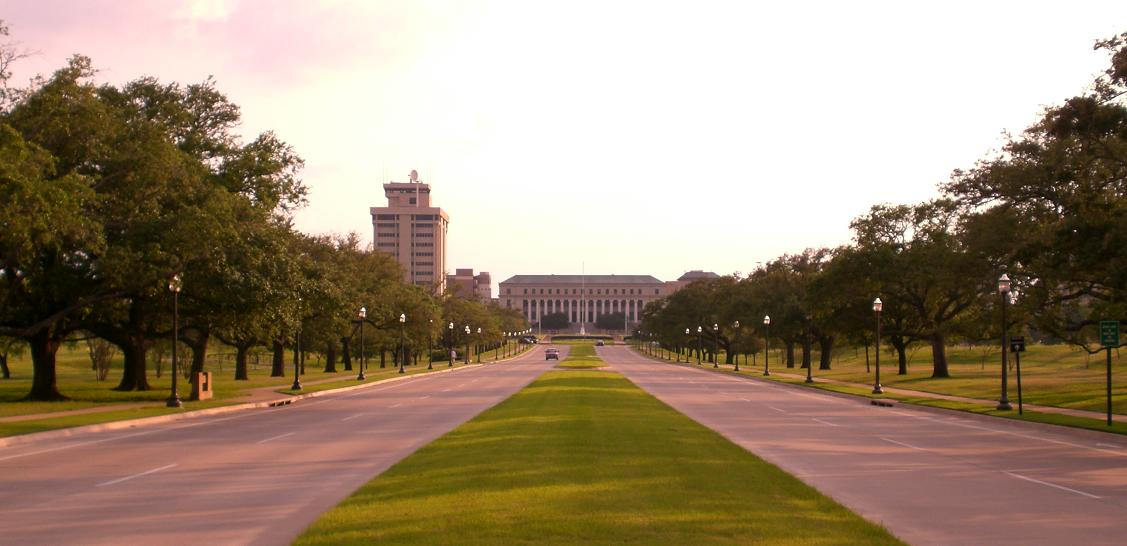
Texas A&M University - College Station

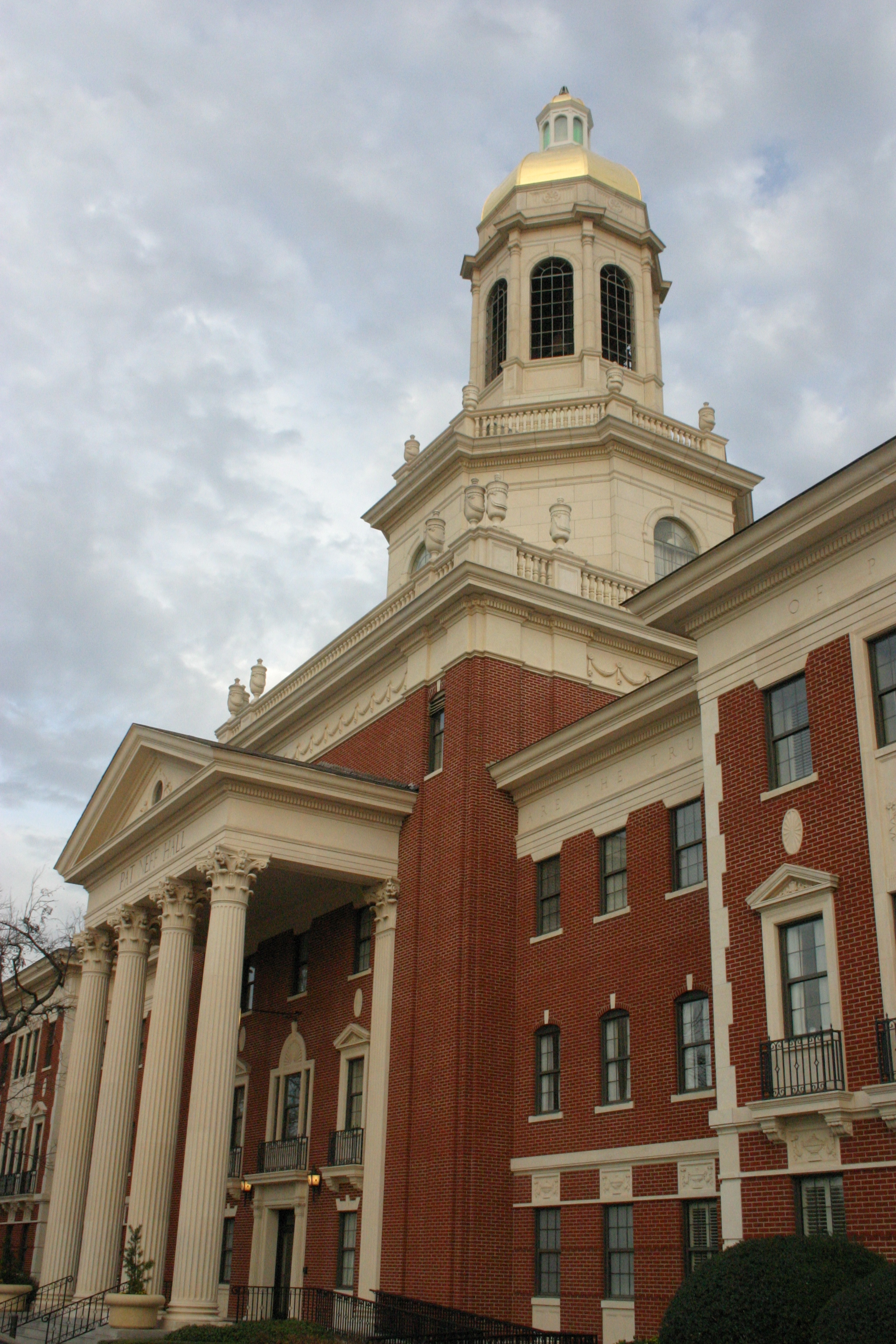
Baylor University - Waco

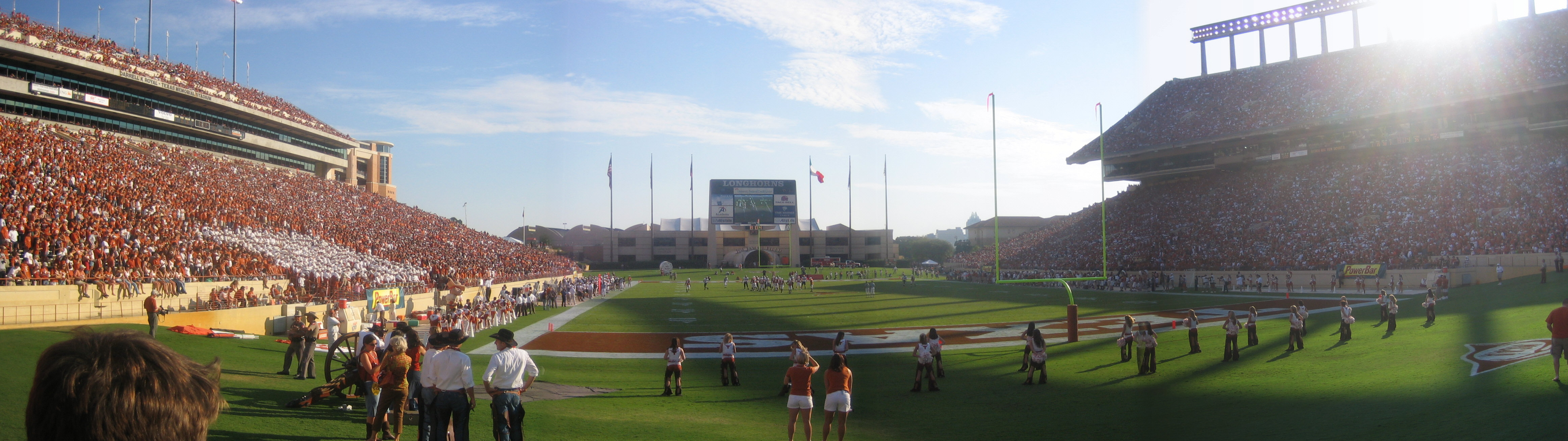
Darrell K Royal–Texas Memorial Stadium - Austin

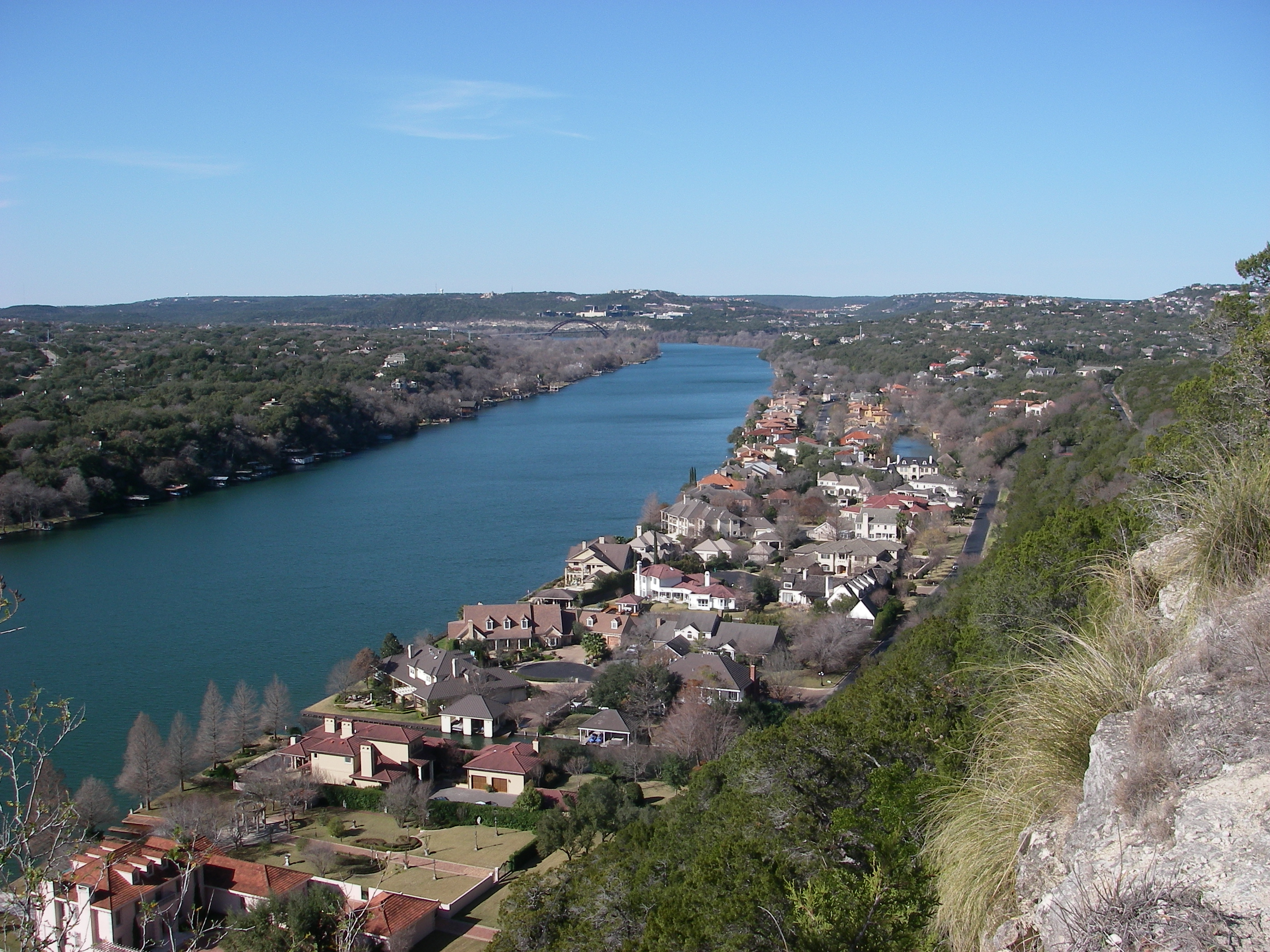
Lake Austin on the Colorado River, as seen from Mount Bonnell

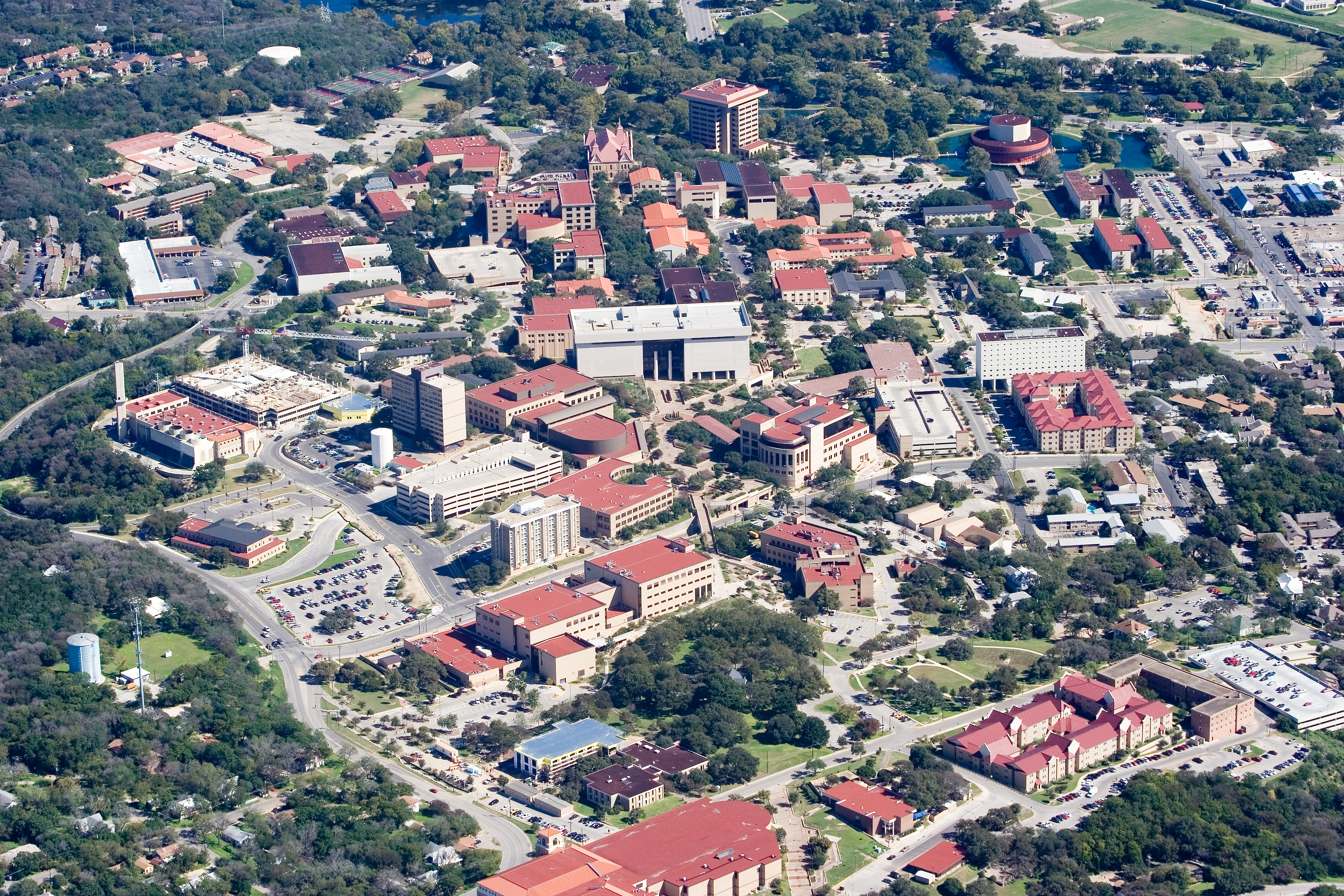
Texas State University - San Marcos

== See also ==
- Edwards Plateau
- July 2025 Central Texas floods
- List of geographical regions in Texas
- Llano Estacado
- Texas Hill Country
