= Stockdale Independent School District =

School district in Texas, United States

Stockdale Independent School District is a public school district based in Stockdale, Texas (USA) and serves students in east central Wilson County. In 2009, the school district was rated "recognized" by the Texas Education Agency.

== Schools ==
- Stockdale High School
- Stockdale Junior High School
- Stockdale Elementary School
