= Calaveras, Texas =

Unincorporated community in Texas, US

Coordinates: 29°13′20″N 98°15′36″W

Calaveras is an American community located in Wilson County, Texas, United States. The population is approximately 100.

Calaveras is southeast of San Antonio.

== History ==
The settlement was originally named "Wright" when it was founded in 1860, in Bexar County. A boundary change in 1869 put it into Wilson County.

In 1885, upon the opening of a post office, the community received its current name. The arrival of the San Antonio and Aransas Pass Railway in 1886 brought prosperity and population growth. In 1900, Calaveras achieved its maximum population of 369. The post office closed in 1925, and after subsequent businesses closing down, the town slowly reduced its population to approximately 100.

== Geography ==
The community is located by the junction of US Route 181 and farm road 3444. The San Antonio River passes south of Calaveras.
