= Kicaster, Texas =

Unincorporated community in Texas, US

Coordinates: 29°18′37″N 98°12′31″W

Kicaster is an unincorporated community in northwestern Wilson County, Texas, United States.
