= Wilson County, Texas =

County in Texas, United States

- County
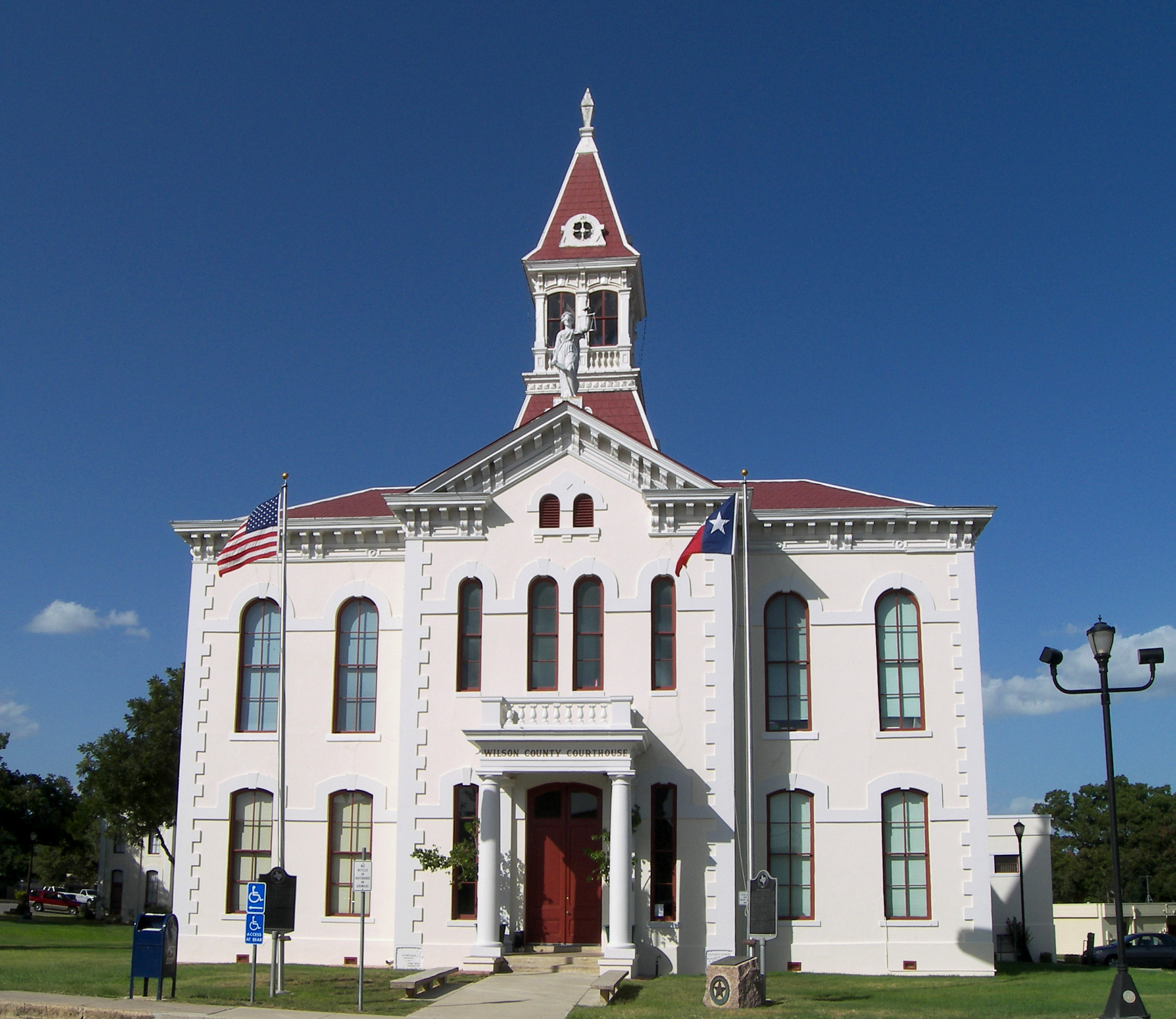
- The Wilson County Courthouse in Floresville. The courthouse was added to the National Register of Historic Places on May 5, 1978.

- Location within the U.S. state of Texas
- Coordinates: 29°10′N 98°05′W
- Country: United States
- State: Texas
- Founded: 1860
- Named for: James Charles Wilson
- Seat: Floresville
- Largest city: Floresville

Area
  - Total: 808 sq mi (2,090 km^{2})
  - Land: 804 sq mi (2,080 km^{2})
  - Water: 4.7 sq mi (12 km^{2}) 0.6%

Population (2020)
  - Total: 49,753
  - Estimate (2025): 56,139 ▲
  - Density: 62/sq mi (24/km^{2})
- Time zone: UTC−6 (Central)
  - Summer (DST): UTC−5 (CDT)
- Congressional district: 15th
- Website: www.co.wilson.tx.us

Wilson County is a county located in the U.S. state of Texas. As of the 2020 census, its population was 49,753. Its county seat is Floresville. The county is named after James Charles Wilson. Wilson County is part of the San Antonio–New Braunfels, Texas, metropolitan statistical area.

== History ==
=== Native Americans ===
Archeological evidence in the Wilson County area reveals early habitation from the paleo-Indians hunter-gatherers period. Later, the area was a hunting range for Tonkawa, Karankawa. Tawakoni, Lipan Apache, and Comanche who lived in the area.

=== Explorations and county established ===
In September 1718 Martín de Alarcón crossed the area on his way to explore the bay of Espíritu Santo. Pedro de Rivera y Villalón crossed the county in 1727 as part of an expedition to inspect the frontier defenses of New Spain. In 1766–67 the Marqués de Rubí included the area in his inspection of the Spanish frontier, and the 1798 explorations of the coast by Francisco Vásquez de Coronado skirted the area.

The first two land grants in the area were to Luis Menchaca and Andrés Hernández, who established ranches circa 1832–1833.

Anglos began arriving in the 1840s, and Southern planters in 1850 and 1860, followed by German and Polish immigrants from other counties.

The last Indian raid in the county occurred in 1855, resulting in the death of an African-American slave by the name of “Lucy”.

Wilson County was formed in 1860 from Bexar County and Karnes County. Sutherland Springs was designated the county seat.

Wilson County voted in favor of secession from the Union, and sent several military units to serve. Wartime hardships were compounded by a three-year drought.

Following the civil war, the county seat was moved to Floresville. The 1872 courthouse was destroyed by fire and replaced in 1884 with a new building designed by Alfred Giles.

Fence Cutting Wars in Texas lasted for approximately five years, 1883–1888. The 40,000-acre (160 km^{2}) ranch of Houston and Dilworth became the focal point in Wilson County. As farmers and ranchers began to compete for precious land and water, cattlemen found it more difficult to feed their herds, prompting cowboys to cut through fences. Texas Governor John Ireland prodded a special assembly to order the fence cutters to cease. In response, the legislature made fence-cutting and pasture-burning crimes punishable with prison time, while at the same time regulating fencing. The practice abated with sporadic incidents of related violence 1888.

The San Antonio and Aransas Pass Railway reached Floresville in 1886. In 1898 the San Antonio and Gulf Railroad was extended to Stockdale.

== Geography ==
According to the U.S. Census Bureau, the county has a total area of 808 square miles (2,090 km^{2}), of which 804 square miles (2,080 km^{2}) are land and 4.7 square miles (12 km^{2}) (0.6%) are covered by water.

=== Major highways ===
- U.S. Highway 87
- U.S. Highway 181
  - Loop 181
- State Highway 97
- State Highway 119
- State Highway 123
- Loop 321

=== Adjacent counties ===
- Guadalupe County (north)
- Gonzales County (northeast)
- Karnes County (southeast)
- Atascosa County (southwest)
- Bexar County (northwest)

== Demographics ==
Historical population
Census	Pop.	Note	%±
1870	2,556		—
1880	7,118		178.5%
1890	10,655		49.7%
1900	13,961		31.0%
1910	17,066		22.2%
1920	17,289		1.3%
1930	17,606		1.8%
1940	17,066		−3.1%
1950	14,672		−14.0%
1960	13,267		−9.6%
1970	13,041		−1.7%
1980	16,756		28.5%
1990	22,650		35.2%
2000	32,408		43.1%
2010	42,918		32.4%
2020	49,753		15.9%
2025 (est.)	56,139	▲	12.8%
U.S. Decennial Census; 1850–2010 2010 2020

=== Racial and ethnic composition ===
Wilson County, Texas – Racial and ethnic composition Note: the US Census treats Hispanic/Latino as an ethnic category. This table excludes Latinos from the racial categories and assigns them to a separate category. Hispanics/Latinos may be of any race.
Race / Ethnicity (NH = Non-Hispanic)	Pop 1980	Pop 1990	Pop 2000	Pop 2010	Pop 2020	% 1980	% 1990	% 2000	% 2010	% 2020
White alone (NH)	10,388	14,273	19,728	25,186	27,877	62.00%	63.02%	60.87%	58.68%	56.03%
Black or African American alone (NH)	154	235	361	644	693	0.92%	1.04%	1.11%	1.50%	1.39%
Native American or Alaska Native alone (NH)	22	30	101	125	148	0.13%	0.13%	0.31%	0.29%	0.30%
Asian alone (NH)	14	17	93	143	229	0.08%	0.08%	0.29%	0.33%	0.46%
Native Hawaiian or Pacific Islander alone (NH)	x	x	12	9	24	x	x	0.04%	0.02%	0.05%
Other race alone (NH)	66	41	22	25	187	0.39%	0.18%	0.07%	0.06%	0.38%
Mixed race or Multiracial (NH)	x	x	257	374	1,363	x	x	0.79%	0.87%	2.74%
Hispanic or Latino (any race)	6,112	8,054	11,834	16,412	19,232	36.48%	35.56%	36.52%	38.24%	38.65%
Total	16,756	22,650	32,408	42,918	49,753	100.00%	100.00%	100.00%	100.00%	100.00%

=== 2020 census ===
As of the 2020 census, the county had a population of 49,753. The median age was 41.3 years. 24.1% of residents were under the age of 18 and 17.2% of residents were 65 years of age or older. For every 100 females there were 100.3 males, and for every 100 females age 18 and over there were 97.5 males age 18 and over.

The racial makeup of the county was 69.3% White, 1.6% Black or African American, 1.0% American Indian and Alaska Native, 0.5% Asian, 0.1% Native Hawaiian and Pacific Islander, 8.8% from some other race, and 18.8% from two or more races. Hispanic or Latino residents of any race comprised 38.7% of the population.

12.7% of residents lived in urban areas, while 87.3% lived in rural areas.

There were 17,419 households in the county, of which 35.8% had children under the age of 18 living in them. Of all households, 63.2% were married-couple households, 14.0% were households with a male householder and no spouse or partner present, and 18.2% were households with a female householder and no spouse or partner present. About 18.1% of all households were made up of individuals and 8.9% had someone living alone who was 65 years of age or older.

There were 18,983 housing units, of which 8.2% were vacant. Among occupied housing units, 83.7% were owner-occupied and 16.3% were renter-occupied. The homeowner vacancy rate was 1.3% and the rental vacancy rate was 9.5%.

=== 2000 census ===
As of the 2000 census, there were 32,408 people, 11,038 households, and 8,830 families residing in the county. The population density was 40 people per square mile (15 people/km^{2}). There were 12,110 housing units at an average density of 15 units per square mile (5.8 units/km^{2}). The racial makeup of the county was 81.19% White, 1.21% Black or African American, 0.58% Native American, 0.30% Asian, 0.04% Pacific Islander, 14.25% from other races, and 2.43% from two or more races. 36.52% of the population were Hispanic or Latino of any race.

There were 11,038 households, out of which 40.00% had children under the age of 18 living with them, 66.50% were married couples living together, 9.20% had a female householder with no husband present, and 20.00% were non-families. 17.10% of all households were made up of individuals, and 7.80% had someone living alone who was 65 years of age or older. The average household size was 2.89 and the average family size was 3.26.

In the county, the population was spread out, with 29.20% under the age of 18, 7.60% from 18 to 24, 28.60% from 25 to 44, 23.20% from 45 to 64, and 11.50% who were 65 years of age or older. The median age was 36 years. For every 100 females, there were 99.70 males. For every 100 females age 18 and over, there were 97.00 males.

The median income for a household in the county was $40,006, and the median income for a family was $45,681. Males had a median income of $31,716 versus $23,582 for females. The per capita income for the county was $17,253. About 9.20% of families and 11.30% of the population were below the poverty line, including 12.40% of those under age 18 and 15.80% of those age 65 or over.

== Communities ==
=== Cities ===
- Elmendorf (mostly in Bexar County)
- Floresville (county seat)
- La Vernia
- Nixon (mostly in Gonzales County)
- Stockdale

=== Towns ===
- Poth

=== Unincorporated communities ===
- Calaveras
- Carpenter
- Kicaster
- Kosciusko
- Pandora
- Saspamco
- Sutherland Springs
- Union

=== Ghost towns ===
- Dewees
- Doseido Colony
- Grass Pond Colony
- Sandy Hills

== Education ==
School districts include:

- Falls City Independent School District
- Floresville Independent School District
- La Vernia Independent School District
- Nixon-Smiley Consolidated Independent School District
- Poth Independent School District
- Stockdale Independent School District

All of the county is in the service area of Alamo Community College District.

== Notable people ==
- John Connally, governor of Texas and U.S. Secretary of the Navy and Treasury
- Merrill Connally, an actor and a county judge
- Wayne Connally, a member of both houses of the Texas State Legislature
- Frank Hamer, Texas Ranger
- Stephen Willeford, civilian who intervened during the Sutherland Springs church shooting

== Gallery ==
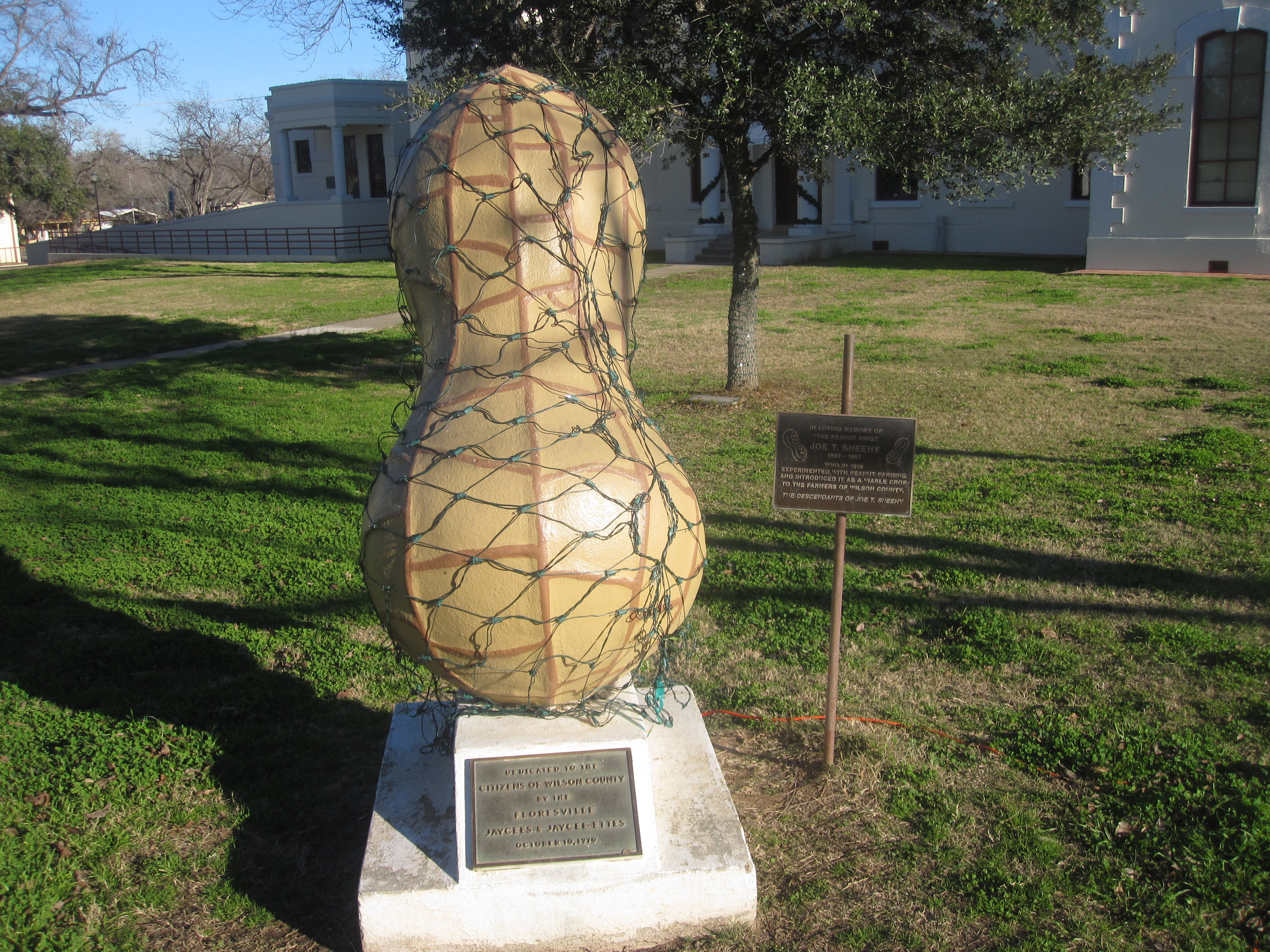
The "Peanut Marker" at the Wilson County Courthouse lawn commemorates the life of Joe T. Sheehy (1886–1967), who introduced peanut farming to the area in 1916.

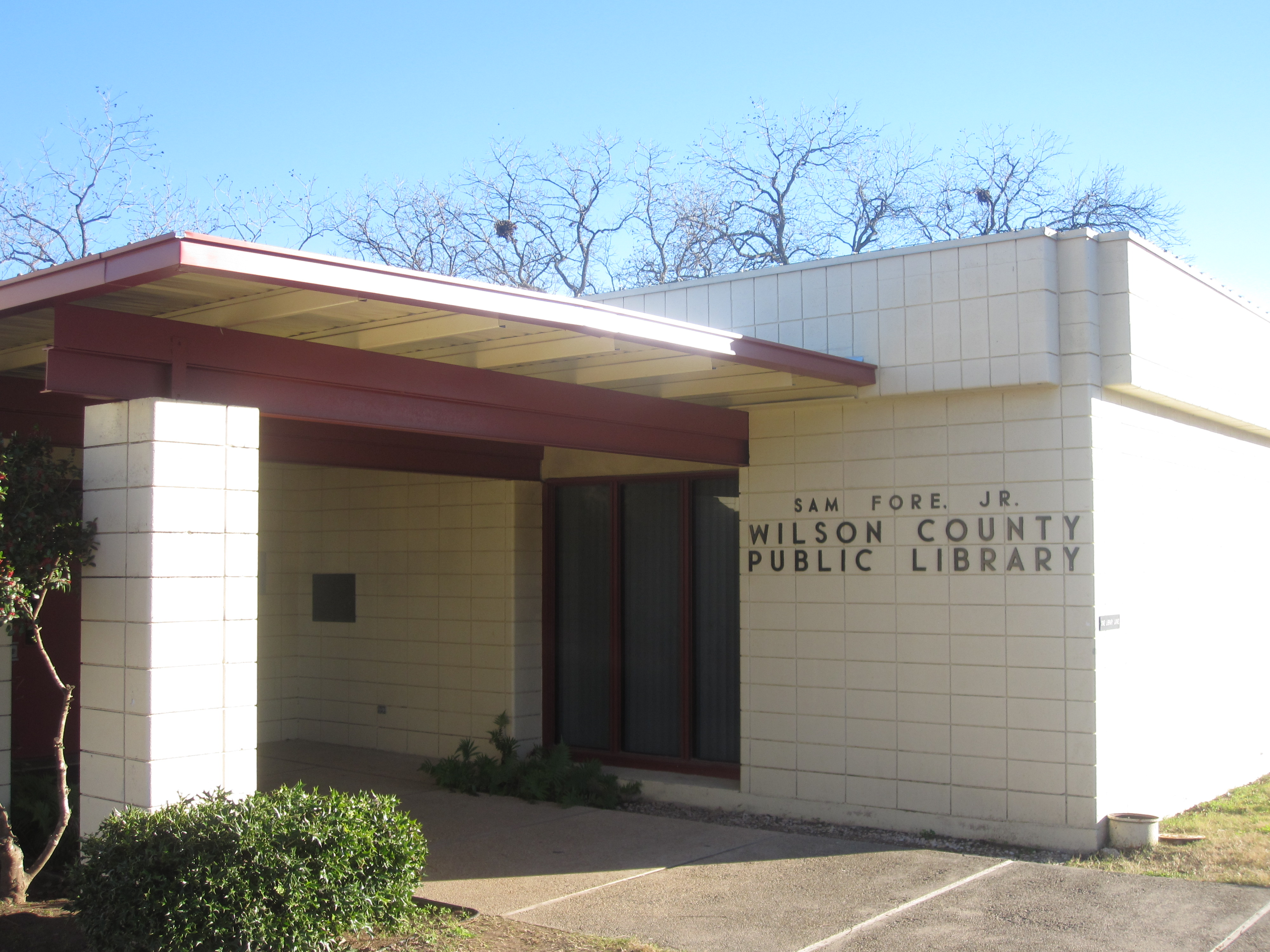
The Wilson County Public Library near the courthouse.

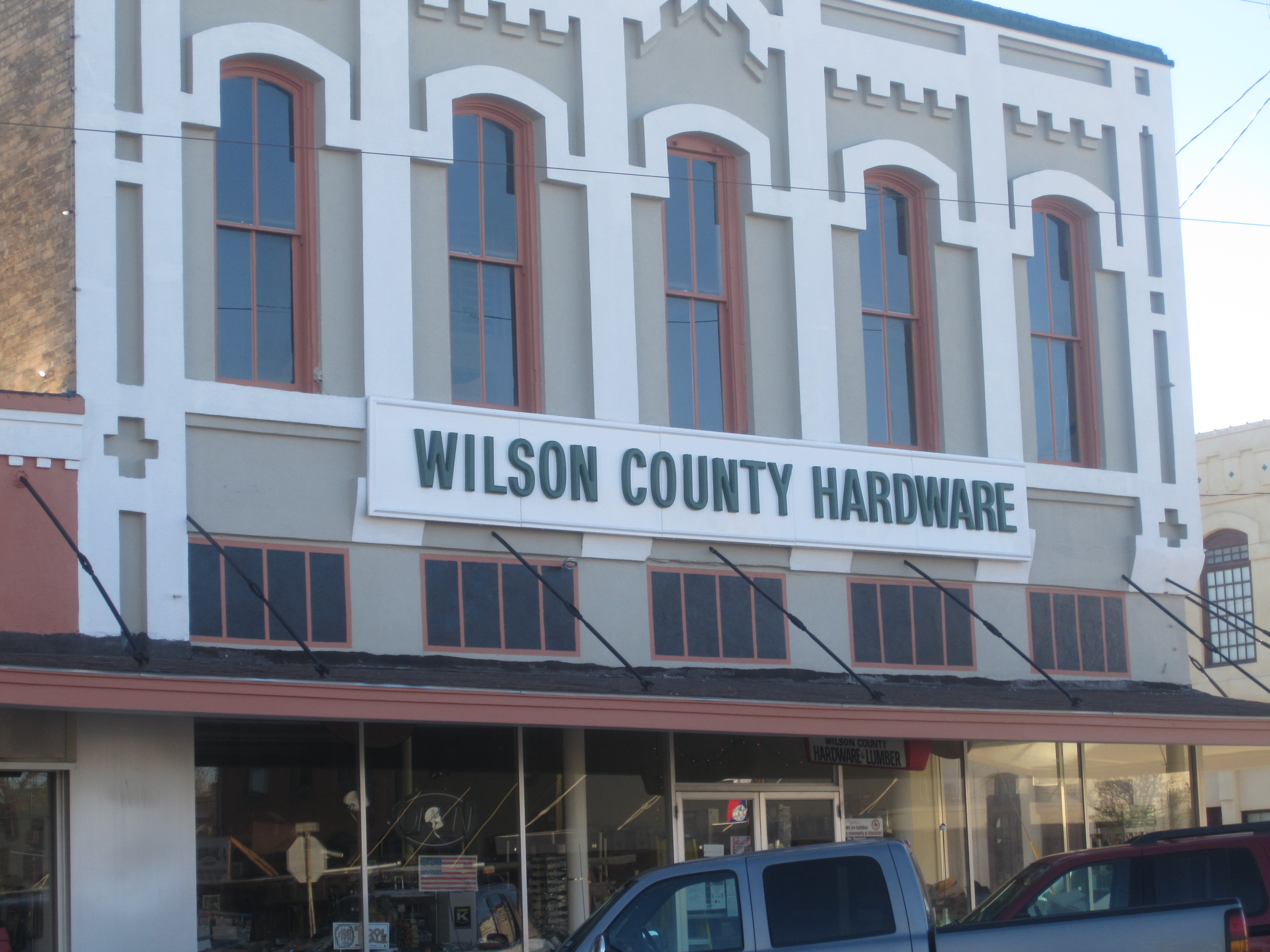
The Wilson County Hardware store in Floresville.

== Politics ==
Wilson County is a strongly Republican county in presidential elections. It last voted for a Democrat in 1976, when it supported Georgia's Jimmy Carter. More recently, in 2020, it gave a quarter of its vote to Democratic candidate Joe Biden. The last time a Democratic candidate won 35% or more of Wilson County's vote was in 1996.

United States presidential election results for Wilson County, Texas
Year	Republican		Democratic		Third party(ies)	
Year	No.	%	No.	%	No.	%
1912	95	9.18%	778	75.17%	162	15.65%
1916	346	27.64%	869	69.41%	37	2.96%
1920	820	46.09%	753	42.33%	206	11.58%
1924	495	20.17%	1,633	66.54%	326	13.28%
1928	622	29.33%	1,499	70.67%	0	0.00%
1932	174	6.66%	2,435	93.22%	3	0.11%
1936	286	9.99%	2,573	89.84%	5	0.17%
1940	605	18.01%	2,750	81.87%	4	0.12%
1944	676	19.13%	2,666	75.46%	191	5.41%
1948	593	19.64%	2,313	76.59%	114	3.77%
1952	1,823	45.40%	2,187	54.47%	5	0.12%
1956	1,519	41.30%	2,149	58.43%	10	0.27%
1960	1,248	30.02%	2,905	69.88%	4	0.10%
1964	718	17.12%	3,472	82.77%	5	0.12%
1968	1,321	31.46%	2,336	55.63%	542	12.91%
1972	2,953	58.68%	2,072	41.18%	7	0.14%
1976	1,926	32.63%	3,973	67.32%	3	0.05%
1980	3,443	51.91%	3,097	46.70%	92	1.39%
1984	4,588	61.72%	2,829	38.05%	17	0.23%
1988	4,436	52.65%	3,953	46.92%	36	0.43%
1992	3,766	39.13%	3,711	38.56%	2,148	22.32%
1996	4,530	49.96%	3,713	40.95%	824	9.09%
2000	7,509	64.19%	3,997	34.17%	192	1.64%
2004	10,400	69.87%	4,409	29.62%	76	0.51%
2008	10,904	66.63%	5,362	32.76%	100	0.61%
2012	12,218	71.01%	4,821	28.02%	166	0.96%
2016	13,998	72.17%	4,790	24.70%	607	3.13%
2020	18,463	73.76%	6,350	25.37%	219	0.87%
2024	20,894	76.60%	6,247	22.90%	134	0.49%

United States Senate election results for Wilson County, Texas1
Year	Republican		Democratic		Third party(ies)	
Year	No.	%	No.	%	No.	%
2024	19,783	72.91%	6,802	25.07%	548	2.02%

United States Senate election results for Wilson County, Texas2
Year	Republican		Democratic		Third party(ies)	
Year	No.	%	No.	%	No.	%
2020	18,327	74.21%	5,943	24.06%	427	1.73%

Texas Gubernatorial election results for Wilson County
Year	Republican		Democratic		Third party(ies)	
Year	No.	%	No.	%	No.	%
2022	14,952	76.81%	4,317	22.18%	197	1.01%

== See also ==
- List of museums in South Texas
- National Register of Historic Places listings in Wilson County, Texas
- Recorded Texas Historic Landmarks in Wilson County
- Wilson County Courthouse and Jail
