= Cottonwood Creek =

Cottonwood Creek may refer to:

== United States ==
=== California ===
- Cottonwood Creek (Encinitas)
- Cottonwood Creek (Inyo County, California)
- Cottonwood Creek (Kern County)
- Cottonwood Creek (Sacramento River tributary)
- Cottonwood Creek (San Diego County)
- Cottonwood Creek (San Luis Creek tributary)

=== Missouri ===
- Cottonwood Creek (Little Tabo Creek tributary)
- Cottonwood Creek (Wakenda Creek tributary)

=== Elsewhere ===
- Cottonwood Creek (Verdigre Creek tributary), Nebraska
- Cottonwood Creek (Cimarron River tributary), Oklahoma
- Cottonwood Creek (Guadalupe County), Texas

== See also ==
- Cottonwood Creek Archeological Site (disambiguation)
- Cottonwood Creek Bridge (disambiguation)
- Cottonwood Creek Ranch Airport, Malheur County, Oregon
