= Elm Creek (Guadalupe County) =

Elm Creek is the name of two separate streams that rise in Guadalupe County southwest of Seguin in South Central Texas, United States. The western Elm Creek runs approximately 14 miles from its source about 8.6 miles southwest of Seguin in southwestern Guadalupe County (in the Texas Prairielands), to its confluence with Cibolo Creek, two miles east of La Vernia in Wilson County. The eastern Elm Creek originates 9.4 miles southwest of Seguin, and proceeds southeast through Guadalupe County, where it discharges into Cottonwood Creek, which itself flows into the Guadalupe River.

== Elm Creek (West) ==
Elm Creek (West)

Location
- Country: United States
- State: Texas

Physical characteristics
- Source
  - location: Seguin, Texas
  - coordinates: 29°30′30″N 98°05′22″W
- Mouth: Cibolo Creek
  - location: La Vernia, Texas
  - coordinates: 29°21′27″N 98°04′59″W
  - elevation: 125 m (410 ft)

The western Elm Creek runs approximately 14 miles from its source about 8.6 miles southwest of Seguin in southwestern Guadalupe County (in the Texas Prairielands), to its confluence with the Cibolo Creek, two miles east of La Vernia in Wilson County. The creek serves as a tributary of the Cibolo Creek and forms its watershed southwest of Seguin, Texas, within the larger mid Guadalupe River Basin and proceeds southwest through New Berlin, Texas and onward to La Vernia.

=== Fauna ===
A wide variety of fish and other wildlife are known to occupy the region. The creek passes through flat to rolling terrain with local shallow depressions, that are surfaced by clay and sandy loams that support water-tolerant hardwoods, honey mesquite, conifers and natural grasses including "Texas spur".

== Elm Creek (East) ==
Elm Creek (East)

Location
- Country: United States
- State: Texas

Physical characteristics
- Source
  - location: Seguin, Texas
  - coordinates: 29°30′26″N 98°01′58″W
- Mouth: Cottonwood Creek (Guadalupe County)
  - location: Seguin, Texas
  - coordinates: 29°29′48″N 97°58′22″W
  - elevation: 148 m (486 ft)

The eastern Elm Creek also forms an eastward flow. Originating 9.4 miles southwest of Seguin, the creek forms within the larger mid Guadalupe River Basin and proceeds southeast through Guadalupe County. It discharges into the Cottonwood Creek near the Thomas Springs, which forms it mouth at the Guadalupe River near Seguin.

== See also ==
- List of rivers of Texas
