= Cottonwood Creek Bridge =

Cottonwood Creek Bridge may refer to:

- Cottonwood Creek Bridge (Colorado Springs, Colorado)
- Cottonwood Creek Bridge (Ismay, Montana)

== See also ==
- Cottonwood Creek (disambiguation)
- Cottonwood Creek Archeological Site (disambiguation)
- Cottonwood Creek Ranch Airport, Malheur County, Oregon
