= 2009 Baylor Bears football team =

American college football season

2009 Baylor Bears football
- Conference: Big 12 Conference
- South Division
- Record: 4–8 (1–7 Big 12)
- Head coach: Art Briles (2nd season)
- Co-offensive coordinators: Randy Clements (2nd season); Philip Montgomery (2nd season)
- Offensive scheme: Veer and shoot
- Defensive coordinator: Brian Norwood (2nd season)
- Base defense: 4–3
- Captain: Game captains
- Home stadium: Floyd Casey Stadium

2009 Big 12 Conference football standings
| | Conf. | | | Overall |
| Team | W | | L | W | | L |
|---|---|---|---|---|---|---|
North Division
| No. 14 Nebraska x | 6 | – | 2 | 10 | – | 4 |
| Missouri | 4 | – | 4 | 8 | – | 5 |
| Kansas State | 4 | – | 4 | 6 | – | 6 |
| Iowa State | 3 | – | 5 | 7 | – | 6 |
| Colorado | 2 | – | 6 | 3 | – | 9 |
| Kansas | 1 | – | 7 | 5 | – | 7 |
South Division
| No. 2 Texas x$ | 8 | – | 0 | 13 | – | 1 |
| Oklahoma State | 6 | – | 2 | 9 | – | 4 |
| No. 21 Texas Tech | 5 | – | 3 | 9 | – | 4 |
| Oklahoma | 5 | – | 3 | 8 | – | 5 |
| Texas A&M | 3 | – | 5 | 6 | – | 7 |
| Baylor | 1 | – | 7 | 4 | – | 8 |
Championship: Texas 13, Nebraska 12
$ – BCS representative as conference champion; x – Division champion/co-champions; Rankings from AP Poll

The 2009 Baylor Bears football team represented Baylor University in the 2009 NCAA Division I FBS football season. The team was coached by Art Briles. The Bears played their home games at Floyd Casey Stadium in Waco, Texas. Baylor finished the season with a record of 4–8 and 1–7 in Big 12 play.

== Before the season ==
=== Program history ===
The Baylor Bears football program finished 2008 with a 4–8 record and a 521–523–43 (0.499) all-time record, marking the first time in decades that Baylor's overall record was losing. The program has not won its conference or attended a bowl game since 1994, when it both won the Southwest Conference (a five-way tie with Rice, Texas, TCU and Texas Tech due to Texas A&M being on NCAA probation and thus ineligible to win the conference title) and played in the 1994 Alamo Bowl; it has not had a winning season record since 1995. The Bears are currently the only Big 12 team to not have made a bowl game since the Big 12's inception, and the team has gone the longest of any team in a BCS conference without a bowl game appearance (Duke Blue Devils last played in a bowl game two days later in the 1995 Hall of Fame Bowl)

=== Recruiting ===
- defensive recruiting coordinator: Kim McCloud
- offensive recruiting coordinator: Kendal Briles

=== Predictions ===
ESPN analyst Tim Griffin criticized Baylor's decision to move its 2009 home game against Texas Tech to the Cowboys Stadium, a more neutral and media-friendly location.

== Facilities ==
In fall 2008, two new facilities, the Highers Athletic Complex and the Simpson Athletics and Academic Center, were completed. The 2009 football season is the first in which the two facilities are available for use year-round. With five consecutive record-breaking fund-raising years for the Baylor Bear Foundation and the "Above and Beyond" and "Victory with Integrity" Board of Regents campaigns, the Highers Athletic Complex and Simpson center were built and Grant Teaff Plaza and club seating were improved, in addition to various other non-football construction and improvements.

=== Highers Athletic Complex ===
The Alwin O. and Dorothy Highers Athletic Complex is a set of three full-size practice football fields, two of natural turf and the third of artificial turf. Located on the main Baylor Campus next to the Baylor Marina, the Highers Athletic Complex is now the main location of football practice. Its location is much closer than that of Floyd Casey Stadium, the current home stadium of Baylor and previous practice location.

Construction began in November 2008 for the Jay and Jenny Allison Indoor Practice Facility. The final facility of the Highers Athletic Complex was completed in August 2009 and offers an 80-yard synthetic turf field with ten-yard end zones. At an estimated $11 million cost, the facility provides Baylor its first indoor practices ever, allowing for practice in most weather, including extreme heat, cold, and rain.

=== Simpson Athletic and Academic Center ===
The Simpson Athletic and Academic Center is located adjacent to the Highers Athletic Complex and Baylor Marina. The Simpson Center has the main athletics training room and equipment room for most Baylor athletes, the football locker room and weight room, football coaches' offices, football meeting rooms, academic center for all student-athletes, and the Baylor Athletic Department administrative offices. In 2008, for the third straight year, Baylor University had the highest NCAA Graduation Success Rate in the Big 12 Conference.

=== Floyd Casey Stadium ===
Floyd Casey Stadium, located about four miles from the Baylor University campus, is the site of the Baylor Bears' home games. The stadium, built in 1950, has an official capacity of 50,000 and has an artificial turf field, fixed aluminum bleachers, and the Big 12's largest locker room.

== Coaching ==
Art Briles remained at Baylor as head coach for his second season there, following four seasons as head coach at the University of Houston and other previous coaching jobs at Texas Tech and various high schools in Texas. As a head coach at Baylor, Briles has a 4–8 record, and a career head coach record of 38–36. In the 2008 season, all Baylor victories were achieved with the opponent scoring 21 points or fewer, and all Baylor losses taken when the opponent scored more than 21 points.

Randy Clements and Philip Montgomery are the offensive co-coordinators, Brian Norwood is the defensive coordinator, and Dino Babers is the Special Teams coordinator. Colin Shillinglaw is the 2009 director of football operations.

Baylor Bears Position Coaching
| Coach | Position |
|---|---|
| Randy Clements | offensive line |
| Philip Montgomery | running backs |
| Dino Babers | wide receivers |
| Kim McCloud | defensive backs |
| Kendal Briles | inside receivers |
| Chris Achuff | defensive tackles |
| Larry Hoefer | linebackers |
| Theo Young | defensive ends |

== Team ==
=== Roster ===
Note: the following is the preseason roster and has been since changed

2009 Baylor Bears football roster
| Number | First | Last | Position | Height (feet) | Weight (lbs) | Class | Redshirt? | EXP | Hometown | State or Province | High School | Last College(s) |
|---|---|---|---|---|---|---|---|---|---|---|---|---|
| 1 | Earl | Patin | LB | 6'2" | 225 | Junior | | 2L | Baton Rouge | Louisiana | Southern University Laboratory School | |
| 1 | Kendall | Wright | IR | 5'11" | 185 | Sophomore | | 1L | Pittsburg | Texas | Pittsburg High School | |
| 2 | Romie | Blaylock | CB | 5'10" | 170 | Sophomore | | 1L | Cedar Hill | Texas | Cedar Hill High School | |
| 2 | Terrance | Williams | WR | 6'2" | 190 | Freshman | Yes | SQ | Dallas | Texas | W. T. White High School | |
| 3 | Antareis | Bryan | CB | 6'2" | 190 | Junior | | 2L | Dallas | Texas | David W. Carter High School | |
| 3 | Ernest | Smith | IR | 6'3" | 200 | Senior | | 3L | New Orleans | Louisiana | Edna Karr School and John Tyler High School | |
| 4 | David | Gettis | WR | 6'4" | 215 | Senior | | 3L | Los Angeles | California | Susan Miller Dorsey High School | |
| 4 | Jeremy | Williams | S | 5'11" | 210 | Senior | | 3L | Dallas | Texas | David W. Carter High School | |
| 5 | Mikail | Baker | DB | 6'0" | 205 | Senior | | 3L | Dallas | Texas | Skyline High School | |
| 5 | Skyler | Scott | WR | 6'3" | 195 | Freshman | | HS | Lancaster | Texas | Lancaster High School | |
| 6 | Antonio | Jones | LB | 6'2" | 235 | Senior | | 3L | Dallas | Texas | Lincoln High School | |
| 6 | Blake | Szymanski | QB | 6'4" | 210 | Senior | | 3L | Wichita Falls | Texas | S. H. Rider High School | |
| 7 | Antonio | Johnson | LB | 6'0" | 210 | Junior | | 2L | Waco | Texas | Waco High School | |
| 7 | Darius | Jones | IR | 6'0" | 180 | Freshman | | HS | Marshall | Texas | Marshall High School | |
| 8 | Tim | Atchison | FS | 6'1" | 205 | Junior | | 2L | Copperas Cove | Texas | Copperas Cove High School | |
| 8 | Glasco | Martin | RB | 6'1" | 200 | Freshman | | HS | Round Rock | Texas | Stony Point High School | |
| 9 | Jameon | Hardeman | DE | 6'1" | 230 | Junior | | 1L | Dallas | Texas | Justin F. Kimball High School | |
| 9 | Brad | Taylor | TE | 6'3" | 235 | Junior | | 2L | Madisonville | Texas | Madisonville High School | |
| 10 | Robert III | Griffin | QB | 6'3" | 210 | Sophomore | | 1L | Copperas Cove | Texas | Copperas Cove High School | |
| 10 | Gary, Jr. | Mason | DE | 6'4" | 255 | Freshman | Yes | SQ | Waxahachie | Texas | Waxahachie High School | |
| 11 | Nick | Florence | QB | 6'1" | 190 | Freshman | | HS | Garland | Texas | South Garland High School | |
| 11 | Phil | Taylor | DT | 6'4" | 355 | Junior | | TR | Clinton | Maryland | Gwynn Park High School | Penn State |
| 12 | Josh | Gordon | WR | 6'4" | 210 | Freshman | | HS | Houston | Texas | Lamar High School | |
| 12 | T.J. | Scranton | S | 5'11" | 190 | Senior | | 1L | Hitchcock | Texas | Hitchcock High School | Kilgore College |
| 13 | Tracy | Robertson | DL | 6'4" | 260 | Sophomore | | 1L | Houston | Texas | Lamar High School | |
| 13 | Brody | Trahan | QB | 6'1" | 210 | Freshman | | HS | Dickinson | Texas | Dickinson High School | |
| 14 | Justin | Akers | TE | 6'4" | 255 | Senior | | 3L | Deer Park | Texas | Deer Park High School | |
| 14 | Byron | Landor | S | 6'1" | 210 | Junior | | JC | Lake Charles | Louisiana | Washington-Marion Magnet High School | Blinn College |
| 15 | Krys | Buerck | WR | 5'11" | 180 | Junior | | 2L | Mesquite | Texas | Mesquite High School | |
| 15 | Chris | McAllister | LB | 6'2" | 225 | Freshman | | HS | Converse | Texas | Judson High School | |
| 16 | Tyler | DeLoach | QB | 6'4" | 190 | Junior | | SQ | Coppell | Texas | Coppell High School | |
| 17 | Mike | Hicks | S | 5'11" | 180 | Freshman | | HS | China Spring | Texas | China Spring High School | |
| 17 | Willie | Jefferson | WR | 6'6" | 210 | Freshman | | HS | Beaumont | Texas | Clifton J. Ozen Magnet High School | |
| 18 | Tevin | Elliot | LB | 6'3" | 225 | Freshman | | HS | Mount Pleasant | Texas | Mount Pleasant High School | |
| 18 | Lanear | Sampson | WR | 6'0" | 200 | Freshman | Yes | SQ | Mesquite | Texas | North Mesquite High School | |
| 19 | Jeremy | Sanders | LB | 6'2" | 210 | Senior | | 1L | Marlin | Texas | Marlin High School | Navarro College |
| 19 | Sam | Sledge | BS | 6'2" | 265 | Senior | | 3L | Midland | Texas | Robert E. Lee High School | |
| 20 | Jerod | Monk | TE | 6'5" | 245 | Freshman | | HS | Wylie | Texas | Wylie High School | |
| 20 | Clifton | Odom | CB | 5'11" | 195 | Junior | | 2L | Arlington | Texas | James Martin High School | |
| 21 | Jordan | Lake | FS | 6'1" | 215 | Senior | | 3L | Houston | Texas | Memorial High School | |
| 21 | Jarred | Salubi | RB | 5'10" | 200 | Freshman | Yes | SQ | Waco | Texas | Waco High School | |
| 22 | Ahmad | Jenkins | CB | 5'11" | 180 | Sophomore | | SQ | Trinidad | Texas | Trinidad High School | |
| 22 | Michael | Valdez | S | 5'10" | 185 | Freshman | | HS | Humble | Texas | Atascocita High School | |
| 23 | Justin | Fenty | IR | 5'9" | 175 | Senior | | 3L | Denton | Texas | Billy Ryan High School | |
| 23 | Anthony | Moore | S | 6'3" | 205 | Freshman | | HS | Converse | Texas | Judson High School | |
| 24 | Terrance | Ganaway | RB | 6'0" | 245 | Sophomore | | JC | DeKalb | Texas | DeKalb High School | Houston and Texarkana College |
| 25 | Reid | Fitzgerald | S | 6'0" | 195 | Freshman | | HS | Argyle | Texas | Liberty Christian School | |
| 25 | Chris | Smith | S | 5'11" | 195 | Freshman | | HS | Houston | Texas | Houston Christian High School | |
| 26 | Rodney | Chadwick | LB | 6'1" | 225 | Freshman | Yes | SQ | Carthage | Texas | Carthage High School | |
| 26 | Travis | McClain | WR | 6'1" | 190 | Sophomore | | SQ | Weatherford | Texas | Weatherford High School | |
| 27 | Dominique | Criss | CB | 5'10" | 195 | Junior | | 2L | Arlington | Texas | Bowie High School | |
| 27 | Bryan | Swindoll | TE | 6'2" | 230 | Sophomore | | SQ | Miami | Florida | Westminster Christian School | |
| 28 | Caleb | McEachern | RB | 5'9" | 210 | Freshman | Yes | SQ | Midlothian | Texas | Midlothian High School | |
| 29 | Logan | Lanier | LB | 5'10" | 200 | Freshman | | HS | Nacogdoches | Texas | Nacogdoches High School | |
| 29 | Andre | Pierce | RB | 5'10" | 195 | Junior | | SQ | Mesquite | Texas | Rowlett High School | |
| 30 | Evan | Hearn | WR | 5'9" | 195 | Junior | | TR | Plainview | Texas | Plainview High School | McMurray |
| 30 | Jenner | Jones | LB | 6'2" | 220 | Freshman | Yes | SQ | Lexington | Texas | Lexington High School | |
| 32 | Jay | Finley | RB | 5'11" | 205 | Junior | | 2L | Corsicana | Texas | Corsicana High School | |
| 33 | Tyler | Pratt | CB | 6'0" | 190 | Freshman | Yes | SQ | Houston | Texas | Cypress Falls High School | |
| 34 | JR | Villaobos | LB | 5'10" | 205 | Junior | Yes | SQ | Marion | Texas | Marion High School | |
| 35 | Denerick | Demby | S | 6'1" | 180 | Freshman | | HS | Spring | Texas | Westfield High School | |
| 36 | Chris | Francis | LB | 6'0" | 235 | Junior | | 2L | Cedar Hill | Texas | Cedar Hill High School | |
| 37 | Elliot | Coffey | LB | 6'0" | 220 | Sophomore | | 1L | Sugar Land | Texas | William P. Clements High School | |
| 38 | Derek | Epperson | P | 6'3" | 235 | Junior | | 2L | Southlake | Texas | Keller High School | |
| 39 | Chance | Casey | CB | 5'11" | 170 | Freshman | | HS | Crosby | Texas | Crosby High School | |
| 40 | Ben | Parks | PK | 6'2" | 200 | Sophomore | | 1L | Argyle | Texas | Argyle High School | |
| 41 | Kolton | Lye | PK | 6'0" | 165 | Freshman | | HS | Austin | Texas | Westlake High School | |
| 41 | Joe | Pawelek | LB | 6'2" | 240 | Senior | | 3L | San Antonio | Texas | Smithson Valley High School | |
| 42 | Chris | Winkler | PK | 5'8" | 160 | Freshman | | HS | Temple | Texas | Temple High School | |
| 43 | Aaron | Jones | PK | 6'4" | 170 | Freshman | | HS | Crowley | Texas | Crowley High School | |
| 43 | Reggie | Rice | LB | 5'11" | 230 | Junior | | TR | Houston | Texas | Eisenhower High School | N.M. Military Academy |
| 44 | Josh | Lewis | LB | 6'0" | 220 | Freshman | | HS | Plano | Texas | Prestonwood Christian Academy | |
| 45 | Andrew | Judy | BS | 6'1" | 235 | Senior | | 1L | Crawford | Texas | Crawford High School | Mary Hardin-Baylor |
| 46 | Erik | Piorkowski | LB | 6'2" | 220 | Sophomore | | TR | Lake St. Louis | Missouri | Wentzville Holt High School | Northern Iowa |
| 47 | LeQuince | McCall | LB | 6'2" | 200 | Freshman | | HS | San Antonio | Texas | Ronald Reagan High School | |
| 48 | Erik | Wolfe | TE | 6'2" | 230 | Freshman | | HS | The Woodlands | Texas | The Woodlands High School | |
| 49 | Kaeron | Johnson | DT | 6'1" | 285 | Freshman | Yes | SQ | Cuero | Texas | Cuero High School | |
| 52 | Blake | Simpson | LS | 5'10" | 230 | Freshman | Yes | SQ | Fort Worth | Texas | All Saints Episcopal School | |
| 53 | Stefan | Huber | OG | 6'5" | 270 | Freshman | | HS | Nederland | Texas | Nederland High School | |
| 54 | Carter | Brunelle | LS | 6'2" | 230 | Senior | | 1L | Duluth | Georgia | Wesleyan School | |
| 55 | J.D. | Walton | C | 6'3" | 305 | Senior | | 2L | Allen | Texas | Allen High School | Arizona State |
| 56 | Jared | Edwards | DE | 6'4" | 255 | Freshman | Yes | SQ | Mansfield | Texas | Mansfield High School | |
| 57 | Matt | Singletary | DE | 6'3" | 250 | Sophomore | | SQ | San Jose | California | Valley Christian High School | |
| 58 | Chance | Reinhardt | DE | 6'4" | 225 | Freshman | | HS | San Antonio | Texas | St. Anthony Catholic High School | |
| 59 | Danny | Watkins | OT | 6'4" | 310 | Junior | | JC | Kelowna | British Columbia | Mount Boucherie Secondary | Butte College |
| 61 | James | Barnard | OG | 6'4" | 300 | Senior | | 2L | Overland Park | Kansas | Shawnee Mission South High School | Coffeyville Community College |
| 62 | Cameron | Lyons | OL | 6'2" | 275 | Freshman | | HS | Cypress | Texas | Cypress Woods High School | |
| 63 | John | Jones | OG | 6'4" | 300 | Sophomore | | 1L | Cedar Hill | Texas | Cedar Hill High School | |
| 64 | Alex | Bonilla | OL | 6'2" | 280 | Freshman | Yes | SQ | Abilene | Texas | Cooper High School | |
| 65 | Zach | Northern | OL | 6'2" | 265 | Freshman | | HS | Hewitt | Texas | Midway High School | |
| 66 | Hunter | Hightower | C | 6'5" | 275 | Sophomore | | SQ | Richardson | Texas | J. J. Pearce High School | |
| 67 | Joe | Korbel | OT | 6'6" | 265 | Sophomore | | 1L | San Antonio | Texas | Churchill High School | |
| 68 | Cyril | Richardson | OT | 6'6" | 305 | Freshman | | HS | Fort Worth | Texas | North Crowley High School | |
| 70 | Jake | Jackson | OL | 6'3" | 290 | Freshman | Yes | SQ | Southlake | Texas | Carroll Senior High School | |
| 71 | Cameron | Kaufhold | OL | 6'4" | 295 | Freshman | Yes | SQ | Friendswood | Texas | Friendswood High School | |
| 73 | Jeramie | Roberts | OG | 6'4" | 315 | Freshman | | HS | Garland | Texas | South Garland High School | |
| 74 | Philip | Blake | OG | 6'3" | 275 | Sophomore | | JC | Brampton | Ontario | Champlain Regional Prep | Tyler Junior College |
| 75 | Jordan | Hearvey | OT | 6'5" | 270 | Senior | | 2L | Richardson | Texas | Richardson High School | |
| 76 | Ivory | Wade | OG | 6'5" | 315 | Freshman | | HS | Dickinson | Texas | Dickinson High School | |
| 77 | Taylor | Douthit | OL | 6'0" | 285 | Freshman | Yes | SQ | McKinney | Texas | McKinney North High School | |
| 78 | Chris | Griesenbeck | OG | 6'6" | 275 | Senior | | 2L | San Antonio | Texas | Robert E. Lee High School | |
| 82 | Lucas | Allison | WR | 6'3" | 190 | Freshman | | HS | Frisco | Texas | Legacy Christian Academy | |
| 83 | Logan | Allison | IR | 5'11" | 175 | Freshman | | HS | Frisco | Texas | Legacy Christian Academy | |
| 84 | Dary | Stone | PK | 6'1" | 175 | Senior | | SQ | Dallas | Texas | Trinity Christian Academy | |
| 85 | Stacy | Williams | WR | 5'11" | 185 | Sophomore | | SQ | Houston | Texas | Jack Yates Senior High School | |
| 86 | Andrew | Sumpter | WR | 6'2" | 200 | Sophomore | | SQ | Flower Mound | Texas | Flower Mound High School | |
| 88 | Jason | Lamb | DT | 6'5" | 275 | Senior | | 3L | Richardson | Texas | Lloyd V. Berkner High School | |
| 88 | Andrew | Sowder | TE | 6'3" | 230 | Sophomore | | SQ | Shallowater | Texas | Shallowater High School | |
| 89 | Thomas | Draper | WR | 6'2" | 185 | Freshman | Yes | SQ | Dallas | Texas | Highland Park High School | |
| 90 | Nicolas | Jean-Baptiste | NT | 6'1" | 310 | Sophomore | | 1L | Stafford | Texas | Strake Jesuit College Preparatory | |
| 91 | Kelvin | Palmer | DE | 6'5" | 285 | Freshman | | HS | Dallas | Texas | W. H. Adamson High School | |
| 92 | Kevin | Park | DE | 6'4" | 235 | Freshman | | HS | Austin | Texas | David Crockett High School | |
| 93 | Daniel | Follis | DE | 6'5" | 210 | Freshman | | HS | Springfield | Missouri | Kickapoo High School | |
| 94 | Chris | Buford | DT | 6'5" | 270 | Junior | | 2L | Arlington | Texas | Bowie High School | |
| 95 | Courtney | Green | DT | 6'3" | 265 | Sophomore | | 1L | Corsicana | Texas | Corsicana High School | |
| 96 | Zac | Scotton | DE | 6'7" | 260 | Sophomore | | 1L | Houston | Texas | Cypress Creek High School | |
| 97 | Trey | Bryant | NT | 6'2" | 315 | Senior | | 3L | Dallas | Texas | Lloyd V. Berkner High School | |
| 98 | Terrance | Lloyd | DE | 6'4" | 230 | Freshman | | HS | Houston | Texas | Stratford High School | |
| 99 | Casey | Cooper | LS | 6'1" | 220 | Senior | | 1L | Abbott | Texas | Abbott High School | Alabama |

== Schedule ==
| Date | Time | Opponent | Site | TV | Result | Attendance |
|---|---|---|---|---|---|---|
| September 5 | 2:30 p.m. | at Wake Forest* | BB&T Field; Winston-Salem, North Carolina | ABC | W 24–21 | 27,905 |
| September 19 | 4:00 p.m. | Connecticut* | Floyd Casey Stadium; Waco, TX | | L 22–30 | 40,147 |
| September 26 | 6:00 p.m. | Northwestern State* | Floyd Casey Stadium; Waco, TX | | W 68–13 | 36,452 |
| October 3 | 6:00 p.m. | Kent State* | Floyd Casey Stadium; Waco, TX | FSN | W 31–15 | 27,047 |
| October 10 | 2:30 p.m. | at No. 21 Oklahoma | Gaylord Family Oklahoma Memorial Stadium; Norman, OK | ABC | L 7–33 | 84,478 |
| October 17 | 6:00 p.m. | at Iowa State | Jack Trice Stadium; Ames, IA | | L 10–24 | 42,253 |
| October 24 | 11:30 a.m. | No. 12 Oklahoma State^{†} | Floyd Casey Stadium; Waco, TX | Versus | L 7–34 | 38,117 |
| October 31 | 11:30 a.m. | Nebraska | Floyd Casey Stadium; Waco, TX | Versus | L 10–20 | 31,702 |
| November 7 | 1:00 p.m. | at Missouri | Faurot Field; Columbia, MO | | W 40–32 | 65,298 |
| November 14 | 11:00 a.m. | No. 3 Texas | Floyd Casey Stadium; Waco, TX (rivalry) | FSN | L 14–47 | 44,372 |
| November 21 | 2:30 p.m. | at Texas A&M | Kyle Field; College Station, Texas (Battle of the Brazos) | | L 3–38 | 82,106 |
| November 28 | 5:00 p.m. | vs. Texas Tech | Cowboys Stadium; Arlington, TX (Texas Farm Bureau Insurance Shootout) | FSN | L 13–20 | 71,964 |
*Non-conference game; ^{†}Homecoming; Rankings from Coaches' Poll released prior to the game; All times are in Central time

== Game summaries ==
=== Wake Forest ===
| | 1 | 2 | 3 | 4 | Total |
|---|---|---|---|---|---|
| Baylor | 10 | 0 | 14 | 0 | 24 |
| Wake Forest | 0 | 7 | 7 | 7 | 21 |

Baylor University entered their season opener as underdogs by two to three points; the game score over-under given by various bookmakers ranged from 51.5 to 54 points. Never trailing at any point in the game, Baylor won on the road, 24–21 (for a combined score of 45), for the first time in the ten games since 22 September 2007. The game also was Baylor's first win in a season opener since 2005, four years prior; Baylor had lost 13 straight road season openers, dating back to 1965. Following the game, Baylor received 17 votes in the AP Poll for week 2, giving the Bears an unofficial #40 rank, and 15 votes in the week 3 poll, for an unofficial #38 ranking. The Coaches' Polls awarded Baylor 2 votes in week 2, for an unofficial #47 rank, and no votes in week 3. Several Baylor players received honors. Baylor had the highest net average punting yardage (46.0 yards per punt) in the Football Bowl Subdivision (FBS) after weeks 1 and 2. In addition, Baylor had the second-highest turnover margin (3.0) in the FBS after week 2, behind Arizona State. Baylor's defense was ranked 37th nationally using the pass efficiency defense rating, and 36th nationally in total defense.

==== Series history ====
Baylor's 2009 game at Wake Forest's BB&T Field in Winston-Salem, North Carolina, is the first away game in the Baylor-Wake Forest series and sixth overall; including the 2009 game, the past four games in the series have been the season openers for both teams. Baylor first played Wake Forest on 1 January 1949, at the 1948 postseason Dixie Bowl in Birmingham, Alabama; Baylor's first bowl game and Wake Forest's second ended in a 20–7 victory. Baylor hosted Wake Forest for the 17 November 1951 game, in which #10 Baylor won 42–0; this remains Baylor's largest margin of victory in a shutout ever, and the last shutout in a season opener victory. In the 20 September 1952 game, Baylor won at home again, 17–14. Baylor again welcomed Wake Forest on 23 September 1961 and won 31–0. On 28 August 2008, Baylor hosted Wake forest for the first time in over 40 years; Wake Forest won for the first time in series history, 41–13.

=== Connecticut ===
| | 1 | 2 | 3 | 4 | Total |
|---|---|---|---|---|---|
| Connecticut | 3 | 10 | 14 | 3 | 30 |
| Baylor | 7 | 0 | 7 | 8 | 22 |

For the Bears' second game, they hosted Connecticut at Floyd Casey Stadium during Baylor's Parents Weekend. Various bookmakers gave Baylor a ten- to eleven-point advantage for the game, with the over-under within 44 to 45.5 combined points, and sports pundits were divided on which team would win.

==== Series history ====
Baylor had only played Connecticut once before, in the preceding 2008 season. In that 19 September 2008 game at Rentschler Field in East Hartford, Connecticut, the Huskies won by a narrow 31–28 points. The game was Baylor's first away game of the season.

=== Northwestern State ===
| | 1 | 2 | 3 | 4 | Total |
|---|---|---|---|---|---|
| Northwestern State | 7 | 3 | 0 | 3 | 13 |
| Baylor | 14 | 27 | 27 | 0 | 68 |

Baylor held its second home game and third overall at home, hosting the Northwestern State Demons. Baylor received the ball first, but a fourth-down rushing attempt failed, and the Demons recovered the ball, eventually resulting in a touchdown. Baylor responded with four consecutive touchdowns before Northwestern State could finally score again, with a field goal; the Bears finished the first half with two more touchdowns. Quarterback Robert Griffin III did not return for the second half due to an injury that required season-ending surgery, but Blake Szymanski still helped the Bears to four more touchdown passes before initiating the quarterback kneel in the fourth quarter to prevent Baylor from scoring further; the Demons managed one field goal in each of the third and fourth quarters. Baylor's score was the team's largest since its 68–0 shutout of the Blackland Army Air Field football team in 1942; the 55-point margin of victory was Baylor's largest since the 20 October 1979 55–0 result in the away game against the Army Black Knights.

==== Series history ====
Baylor has played and beaten Northwestern State, of the Football Championship Subdivision, twice before. On 9 September 2006, Baylor hosted Northwestern State and won 47–10. On 6 September 2008, Baylor hosted again and won 51–6 in Robert Griffin III's first game as starting quarterback; the score was the largest margin of victory for Baylor since the 24 November 2001 home game against Southern Illinois University, also of the FCS.

=== Kent State ===
| | 1 | 2 | 3 | 4 | Total |
|---|---|---|---|---|---|
| Kent State | 7 | 0 | 6 | 2 | 15 |
| Baylor | 7 | 14 | 7 | 3 | 31 |

The general bookmaker consensus for this game was a Baylor win by at least 20 points, with a combined score of about 50. The Bears opened up the game worried about how their season would progress without Robert Griffin III. Third string quarterback Nick Florence showed himself capable of maintaining Baylor dominance of the Mid-American Conference as he passed 20-27 without an interception, only getting sacked twice throughout the whole game, and rushing for two touchdowns.

==== Series history ====
Baylor has never played a football game against Kent State until this season.

=== Oklahoma ===
| | 1 | 2 | 3 | 4 | Total |
|---|---|---|---|---|---|
| Baylor | 0 | 7 | 0 | 0 | 7 |
| Oklahoma | 0 | 14 | 9 | 10 | 33 |

Baylor entered Oklahoma Memorial Stadium seeking their first-ever win against Oklahoma, with the nation's longest current home game winning streak (at 26 games), and their first win since 2004 against a ranked opponent. Uncertainty about the outcome of the game was expressed by many, due largely to the fact that 2008 Heisman Trophy winner Sam Bradford was not certain to lead Oklahoma against Baylor following a shoulder injury that left him out of earlier games. A few days before the game, though, Bradford was confirmed as starting quarterback for the game; bookmakers listed Oklahoma as the obvious favorite, with the spread at least 25 points and a combined score over/under of about 54. Despite a strong showing from the Baylor defense, keeping Oklahoma scoreless until midway through the second quarter, the offense, led by third string Nick Florence, was just as unable to score. After Oklahoma made two touchdowns to bring the game to 14–0, Baylor was able to act as well, responding with a touchdown of their own. In the second half, Oklahoma consistently moved the ball down the field, but was held by Baylor's defense to four field goals, before finally scoring a touchdown late in the fourth quarter. Blake Szymanski, Baylor's second-string quarterback, led the Bears' final drive; despite a 42-yard pass from Szymanski to David Gettis, Baylor did not score due to an end zone interception.

==== Series history ====
Baylor has played Oklahoma eighteen times, with thirteen games in Big 12 play. The Bears have never defeated the Sooners, making Oklahoma the only opponent Baylor has faced at least five times and never beaten. The closest recent game was in 2005, when the Sooners won 37–30 in a double-overtime game.

Baylor-Oklahoma Series
| Date | Location | Winner | Score | TV |
|---|---|---|---|---|
| October 26, 1901 | Waco | Oklahoma | 17–6 | |
| September 15, 1973 | Waco | Oklahoma | 42–14 | |
| September 14, 1974 | Norman | Oklahoma | 28–11 | |
| September 22, 1984 | Norman | Oklahoma | 34–15 | |
| September 9, 1989 | Norman | Oklahoma | 33–7 | |
| October 19, 1996 | Waco | Oklahoma | 28–24 | |
| October 18, 1997 | Norman | Oklahoma | 24–23 | FSN |
| November 14, 1998 | Waco | Oklahoma | 28–16 | |
| September 18, 1999 | Norman | Oklahoma | 41–10 | FSN |
| November 4, 2000 | Waco | Oklahoma | 56–7 | |
| October 20, 2001 | Norman | Oklahoma | 33–17 | |
| November 16, 2002 | Waco | Oklahoma | 49–9 | |
| November 15, 2003 | Norman | Oklahoma | 41–3 | |
| November 20, 2004 | Waco | Oklahoma | 35–0 | FSN |
| October 22, 2005 | Norman | Oklahoma | 37–30 | FSN |
| November 18, 2006 | Waco | Oklahoma | 36–10 | FSN |
| November 10, 2007 | Norman | Oklahoma | 52–21 | FSN |
| October 4, 2008 | Waco | Oklahoma | 49–17 | FSN |

=== Iowa State ===
| | 1 | 2 | 3 | 4 | Total |
|---|---|---|---|---|---|
| Baylor | 3 | 0 | 0 | 7 | 10 |
| Iowa State | 0 | 14 | 10 | 0 | 24 |

Baylor meets Iowa State for a game that will break a losing streak for one of the teams. Baylor has lost twelve consecutive Big 12 road games dating back to 2006, and Iowa State has lost eleven straight Big 12 games, including a loss to Baylor at Floyd Casey Stadium in 2008 (Iowa State also has lost fifteen consecutive Big 12 road games, dating back to 2005). For Iowa State, the game is particularly important, as it aims for its first Homecoming game victory since 2005.

Sports betting websites gave Iowa State a narrow 1.5-point advantage, with an over/under between 50 and 55.

Despite scoring first with a field goal, Baylor was kept out of the endzone for nearly the whole game, finally scoring a touchdown in the final minute of play. Iowa State University, dominant throughout the entire game, secured their first conference win since 2007. Starting quarterback Blake Szymanski threw three interceptions, the most by a Baylor player since the 2007 game against Texas.

==== Series history ====
Baylor and Iowa State have met eight times, splitting victories equally between them. Baylor has won their last two meetings; in 2008, the Bears won one their two conference games against Iowa State, 38–10.

Baylor-Iowa State Series
| Date | Location | Winner | Score | TV |
|---|---|---|---|---|
| September 17, 1988 | Ames | Baylor | 35–0 | Raycom Sports |
| October 26, 1996 | Waco | Baylor | 49–21 | |
| October 25, 1997 | Ames | Iowa State | 24–17 | |
| September 30, 2000 | Waco | Iowa State | 31–17 | |
| September 29, 2001 | Ames | Iowa State | 41–0 | |
| October 23, 2004 | Waco | Iowa State | 26–25 | |
| October 8, 2005 | Ames | Baylor | 23–13 | |
| October 11, 2008 | Waco | Baylor | 38–10 | Fox College Sports |

=== Oklahoma State ===
| | 1 | 2 | 3 | 4 | Total |
|---|---|---|---|---|---|
| Oklahoma State | 10 | 7 | 10 | 7 | 34 |
| Baylor | 0 | 0 | 0 | 7 | 7 |

Having lost its last nineteen games against ranked opponents, Baylor was hoping for a Homecoming miracle to beat #12 Oklahoma State. Unfortunately, Oklahoma State, facing major injuries like Baylor, was preparing for its showdown with the Texas Longhorns for the Big 12 South leadership, and used Baylor to do it. OSU quarterback set a team record with his 85 percent completion rate, and Baylor scored its first points, a touchdown and successful try, in the fourth quarter. Statistically, the teams' efforts were similar, except in OSU's much better ability to rush the ball, and its better kickoff yardage.

=== Nebraska ===
| | 1 | 2 | 3 | 4 | Total |
|---|---|---|---|---|---|
| Nebraska | 10 | 10 | 0 | 0 | 20 |
| Baylor | 0 | 0 | 10 | 0 | 10 |

=== Missouri ===
| | 1 | 2 | 3 | 4 | Total |
|---|---|---|---|---|---|
| Baylor | 9 | 7 | 10 | 14 | 40 |
| Missouri | 7 | 20 | 2 | 3 | 32 |

=== Texas ===
| | 1 | 2 | 3 | 4 | Total |
|---|---|---|---|---|---|
| Texas | 14 | 26 | 0 | 7 | 47 |
| Baylor | 0 | 0 | 0 | 14 | 14 |

=== Texas A&M ===
| | 1 | 2 | 3 | 4 | Total |
|---|---|---|---|---|---|
| Baylor | 3 | 0 | 0 | 0 | 3 |
| Texas A&M | 14 | 7 | 3 | 14 | 38 |

=== Texas Tech ===
| | 1 | 2 | 3 | 4 | Total |
|---|---|---|---|---|---|
| Texas Tech | 0 | 3 | 14 | 2 | 19 |
| Baylor | 3 | 7 | 3 | 0 | 13 |
