= Santa Clara, Texas =

- City
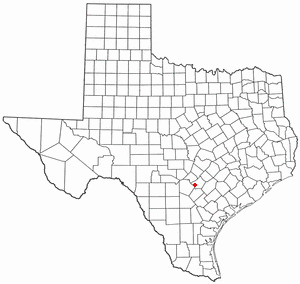
- Location of Santa Clara, Texas

- Coordinates: 29°35′48″N 98°08′24″W
- Country: United States
- State: Texas
- County: Guadalupe

Area
  - Total: 2.15 sq mi (5.58 km^{2})
  - Land: 2.15 sq mi (5.58 km^{2})
  - Water: 0 sq mi (0.00 km^{2})
- Elevation: 702 ft (214 m)

Population (2020)
  - Total: 778
  - Density: 361/sq mi (139/km^{2})
- Time zone: UTC-6 (Central (CST))
  - Summer (DST): UTC-5 (CDT)
- FIPS code: 48-65690
- GNIS feature ID: 2411817
- Website: www.santaclaratx.gov

Santa Clara is a city in Guadalupe County, Texas, United States. The population was 778 at the 2020 census, up from 725 at the 2010 census. It is part of the San Antonio Metropolitan Statistical Area.

Santa Clara was incorporated as a city in May 1999.

== Geography ==
Santa Clara is located in western Guadalupe County. It is west and north of Marion and east of Cibolo. Seguin, the county seat, is 13 miles (21 km) to the east, and downtown San Antonio is 25 miles (40 km) to the southwest.

According to the United States Census Bureau, Santa Clara has a total area of 2.4 square miles (6.3 km^{2}), all land.

== Demographics ==
Historical population
Census	Pop.	Note	%±
2000	889		—
2010	725		−18.4%
2020	778		7.3%
U.S. Decennial Census; 2020 Census

=== 2020 census ===
As of the 2020 census, Santa Clara had a population of 778. The median age was 48.0 years. 18.6% of residents were under the age of 18 and 21.2% of residents were 65 years of age or older. For every 100 females there were 100.0 males, and for every 100 females age 18 and over there were 97.2 males.

0.0% of residents lived in urban areas, while 100.0% lived in rural areas.

There were 286 households in Santa Clara, of which 28.7% had children under the age of 18 living in them. Of all households, 68.5% were married-couple households, 12.2% were households with a male householder and no spouse or partner present, and 16.1% were households with a female householder and no spouse or partner present. About 14.6% of all households were made up of individuals and 5.9% had someone living alone who was 65 years of age or older.

There were 300 housing units, of which 4.7% were vacant. The homeowner vacancy rate was 1.9% and the rental vacancy rate was 0.0%.

Racial composition as of the 2020 census
Race	Number	Percent
White	591	76.0%
Black or African American	8	1.0%
American Indian and Alaska Native	1	0.1%
Asian	2	0.3%
Native Hawaiian and Other Pacific Islander	1	0.1%
Some other race	37	4.8%
Two or more races	138	17.7%
Hispanic or Latino (of any race)	196	25.2%

=== 2000 census ===
As of the 2000 census, there were 889 people, 297 households, and 247 families residing in the city. The population density was 428.0 inhabitants per square mile (165.3/km^{2}). There were 310 housing units at an average density of 149.2 per square mile (57.6/km^{2}). The racial makeup of the city was 90.21% White, 1.35% African American, 0.67% Native American, 0.11% Asian, 0.11% Pacific Islander, 5.62% from other races, and 1.91% from two or more races. Hispanic or Latino of any race were 13.16% of the population.

There were 297 households, out of which 43.4% had children under the age of 18 living with them, 74.7% were married couples living together, 5.7% had a female householder with no husband present, and 16.5% were non-families. 12.1% of all households were made up of individuals, and 4.0% had someone living alone who was 65 years of age or older. The average household size was 2.99 and the average family size was 3.27.

In the city, the population was spread out, with 28.6% under the age of 18, 8.2% from 18 to 24, 28.1% from 25 to 44, 26.3% from 45 to 64, and 8.8% who were 65 years of age or older. The median age was 37 years. For every 100 females, there were 102.0 males. For every 100 females age 18 and over, there were 95.4 males.

The median income for a household in the city was $51,250, and the median income for a family was $54,500. Males had a median income of $36,447 versus $27,313 for females. The per capita income for the city was $31,971. About 1.8% of families and 7.9% of the population were below the poverty line, including 15.0% of those under age 18 and none of those age 65 or over.

== Education ==
Santa Clara is served by the Marion Independent School District.
