= Marion High School (Texas) =

Location
- 504 Bulldog; Marion, Texas 78124-0189; United States
- Coordinates: 29.5671°N 98.1412°W

Information
- School type: Public high school
- School district: Marion Independent School District
- Principal: Elizardo Hernandez
- Teaching staff: 38.22 (FTE)
- Grades: 9-12
- Enrollment: 478 (2023-2024)
- Student to teacher ratio: 12.51
- Colors: Green & White
- Athletics conference: UIL Class AAA
- Mascot: Bulldog
- Website: Marion High School website

Marion High School is a public high school located in Marion, Texas (USA). It is part of the Marion Independent School District located in west central Guadalupe County and classified as a 3A school by the UIL. In 2015, the school was rated "Met Standard" by the Texas Education Agency.

== Athletics ==
The Marion Bulldogs compete in cross country, volleyball, football, basketball, golf, tennis, track, softball and baseball.

=== State titles ===
- Girls Cross Country -
  - 1989(2A)
- Girls Basketball -
  - 1993(2A)
- One Act Play -
  - 1989(2A)

=== State finals appearances ===
- Girls Basketball -
  - 1990(2A)
