= Alum, Texas =

Alum
- Ghost town
- Location within Texas
- Country: United States
- State: Texas
- County: Wilson County
- Settled: before 1900
- Named for: nearby Alum Creek

Alum is a ghost town in Wilson County, in the U.S. state of Texas.

== History ==
The first settlement was made at Alum before 1900. The community took its name from nearby Alum Creek. The town had dwindled to a few houses in the 1990s, and was abandoned before 2000.
