= Zuehl, Texas =

- Census-designated place
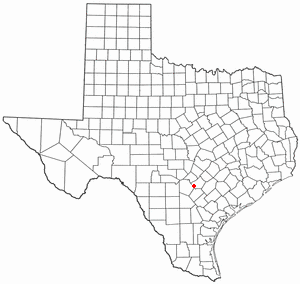
- Location of Zuehl, Texas

- Coordinates: 29°29′30″N 98°09′02″W
- Country: United States
- State: Texas
- County: Guadalupe

Area
  - Total: 7.0 sq mi (18.2 km^{2})
  - Land: 7.0 sq mi (18.2 km^{2})
  - Water: 0 sq mi (0.0 km^{2})
- Elevation: 587 ft (179 m)

Population (2020)
  - Total: 399
  - Density: 56.8/sq mi (21.9/km^{2})
- Time zone: UTC-6 (Central (CST))
  - Summer (DST): UTC-5 (CDT)
- FIPS code: 48-80836
- GNIS feature ID: 2409648

Zuehl (/ziːl/ zeel) is an unincorporated area and census-designated place in western Guadalupe County, Texas, United States. It is part of the San Antonio Metropolitan Statistical Area. Located on Cibolo Creek, it lies 13 miles (21 km) southwest of Seguin. The population was 399 at the 2020 census.

Once known as "Perryman's Crossing", it was a crossing on the Wood Road, an early road between Gonzales and San Antonio. Wilhelm Zuehl bought the land in 1870 and two years later opened a store, from which the community took its name.

== Geography ==
Zuehl is located on the western edge of Guadalupe County. The western border of the CDP follows Cibolo Creek, which is also the Bexar County line. Zuehl is bordered to the north by the city of Cibolo and to the east by New Berlin. Interstate 10 runs just north of the northern border of Zuehl, within Cibolo, and with access from Exit 595. I-10 leads east 13 miles (21 km) to Seguin, the Guadalupe County seat, and west 21 miles (34 km) to San Antonio.

According to the United States Census Bureau, the Zuehl CDP has a total area of 7.0 square miles (18.2 km^{2}), all land.

== Demographics ==
Historical population
Census	Pop.	Note	%±
2000	346		—
2010	376		8.7%
2020	399		6.1%
U.S. Decennial Census; 1850–1900 1910; 1920 1930 1940; 1950 1960 1970; 1980 1990 2000; 2010 2020

Zuehl first appeared as a census designated place in the 2000 U.S. census.

=== 2020 census ===
Zuehl CDP, Texas – Racial and ethnic composition Note: the US Census treats Hispanic/Latino as an ethnic category. This table excludes Latinos from the racial categories and assigns them to a separate category. Hispanics/Latinos may be of any race.
Race / Ethnicity (NH = Non-Hispanic)	Pop 2000	Pop 2010	Pop 2020	% 2000	% 2010	% 2020
White alone (NH)	311	319	302	89.88%	84.84%	75.69%
Black or African American alone (NH)	0	0	1	0.00%	0.00%	0.25%
Native American or Alaska Native alone (NH)	2	1	2	0.58%	0.27%	0.50%
Asian alone (NH)	2	5	5	0.58%	1.33%	1.25%
Native Hawaiian or Pacific Islander alone (NH)	0	0	0	0.00%	0.00%	0.00%
Other race alone (NH)	0	0	0	0.00%	0.00%	0.00%
Mixed race or Multiracial (NH)	1	5	15	0.29%	1.33%	3.76%
Hispanic or Latino (any race)	30	46	74	8.67%	12.23%	18.55%
Total	346	376	399	100.00%	100.00%	100.00%

=== 2000 census ===
As of the census of 2000, there were 346 people, 128 households, and 103 families residing in the CDP. The population density was 48.6 inhabitants per square mile (18.8/km^{2}). There were 140 housing units at an average density of 19.7/sq mi (7.6/km^{2}). The racial makeup of the CDP was 94.80% White, 0.58% Native American, 0.58% Asian, 2.60% from other races, and 1.45% from two or more races. Hispanic or Latino of any race were 8.67% of the population.

There were 128 households, out of which 30.5% had children under the age of 18 living with them, 70.3% were married couples living together, 7.8% had a female householder with no husband present, and 19.5% were non-families. 17.2% of all households were made up of individuals, and 4.7% had someone living alone who was 65 years of age or older. The average household size was 2.70 and the average family size was 2.98.

In the CDP, the population was spread out, with 22.8% under the age of 18, 8.4% from 18 to 24, 25.4% from 25 to 44, 29.5% from 45 to 64, and 13.9% who were 65 years of age or older. The median age was 41 years. For every 100 females, there were 108.4 males. For every 100 females age 18 and over, there were 107.0 males.

The median income for a household in the CDP was $37,292, and the median income for a family was $51,250. Males had a median income of $27,083 versus $37,431 for females. The per capita income for the CDP was $33,840. About 8.6% of families and 6.3% of the population were below the poverty line, including none of those under the age of eighteen or sixty-five or over.

== Education ==
Zuehl is served by the Marion Independent School District.
