= Bracken, Texas =

- Unincorporated community
- Location within Texas Location within the United States
- Coordinates: 29°36′36″N 98°19′16″W
- Country: United States
- State: Texas
- County: Comal
- Elevation: 801 ft (244 m)
- Time zone: UTC-6 (Central (CST))
  - Summer (DST): UTC-5 (CDT)
- Area code: 830
- GNIS feature ID: 1331170

Bracken is an unincorporated community in Comal County, Texas, United States. According to the Handbook of Texas, the community had a population of 76 in 2000. Bracken is in the Texas German belt region, this region was settled primarily by German emigrants in the mid 1800s. It is included in the Greater San Antonio area.

== History ==
William Bracken, who bought land in the region in 1849, is the reason behind the name Bracken. In honor of James G. Davenport, who settled there in 1868, the townsite on the new railroad was given the name Davenport. Residents petitioned for a post office as the community grew and a gin and stores were built. Since there was already a Davenport post office in the state, the name was changed from Davenport to Bracken in 1883. The population was listed as 50 in 1940 when the post office was closed. In the 1970s, Bracken's population leveled down to roughly 75. It was still 75 in 1990 and 76 in 2000.

William Bracken purchased 1,114 acres (4.51 km^{2}) of land after receiving a grant from Governor Peter Hansborough Bell. Following the completion of the railroad in 1890, a depot was built as well as a ticket stand. Soon, saloons lined the town's seven blocks, which expanded to thirteen near the turn of the century. Stores and other businesses including a blacksmith, cotton gin, and lumberyard sprung up as well, contributing to the booming railroad economy. A dance hall, notorious for fights, was the center of entertainment until 1915 when a bowling alley was opened. After the passage of the Eighteenth Amendment to the United States Constitution implementing Prohibition, the town suffered a steep decline. Businesses left town and the general store burned to the ground.

== Geography ==
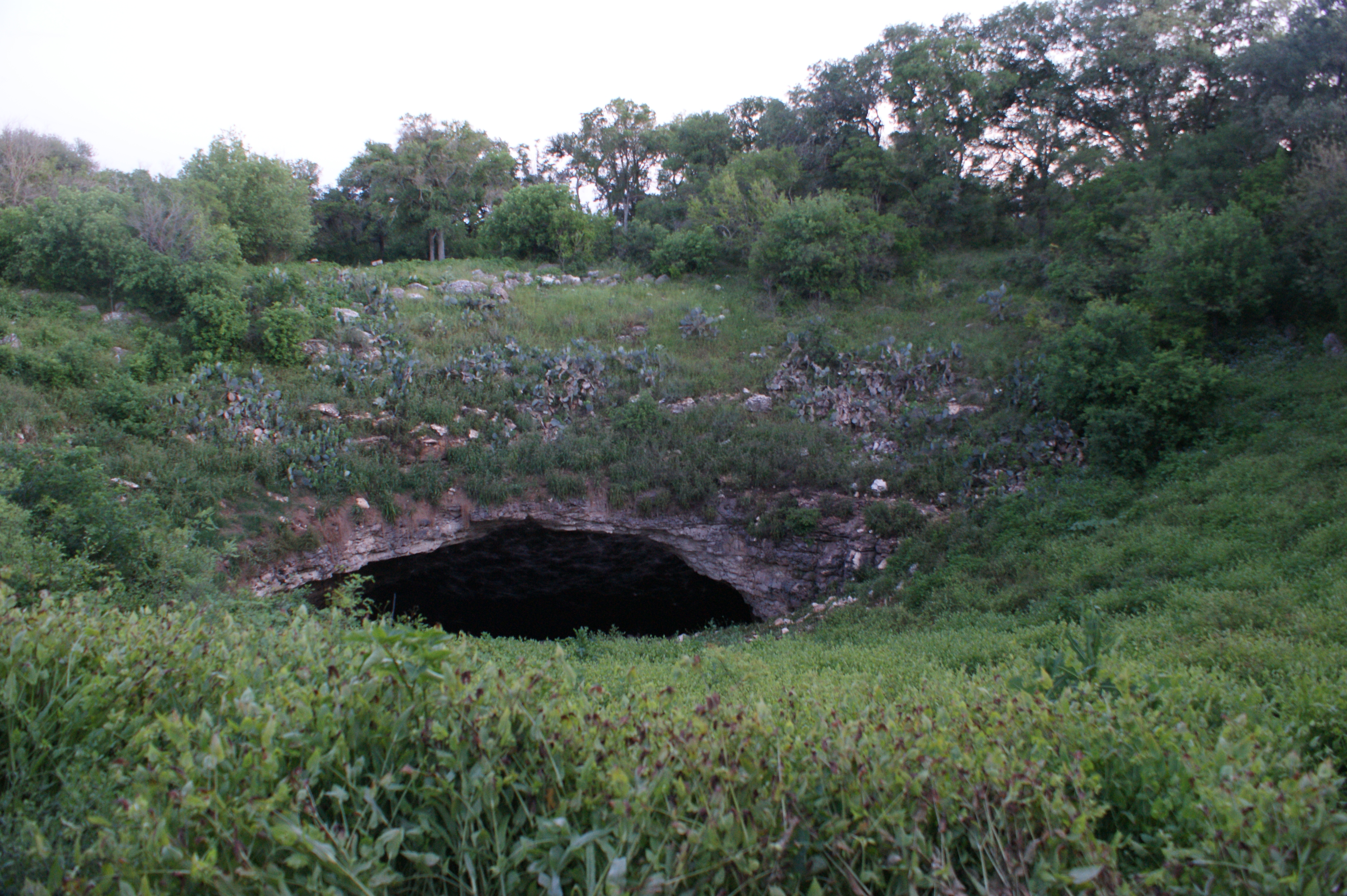
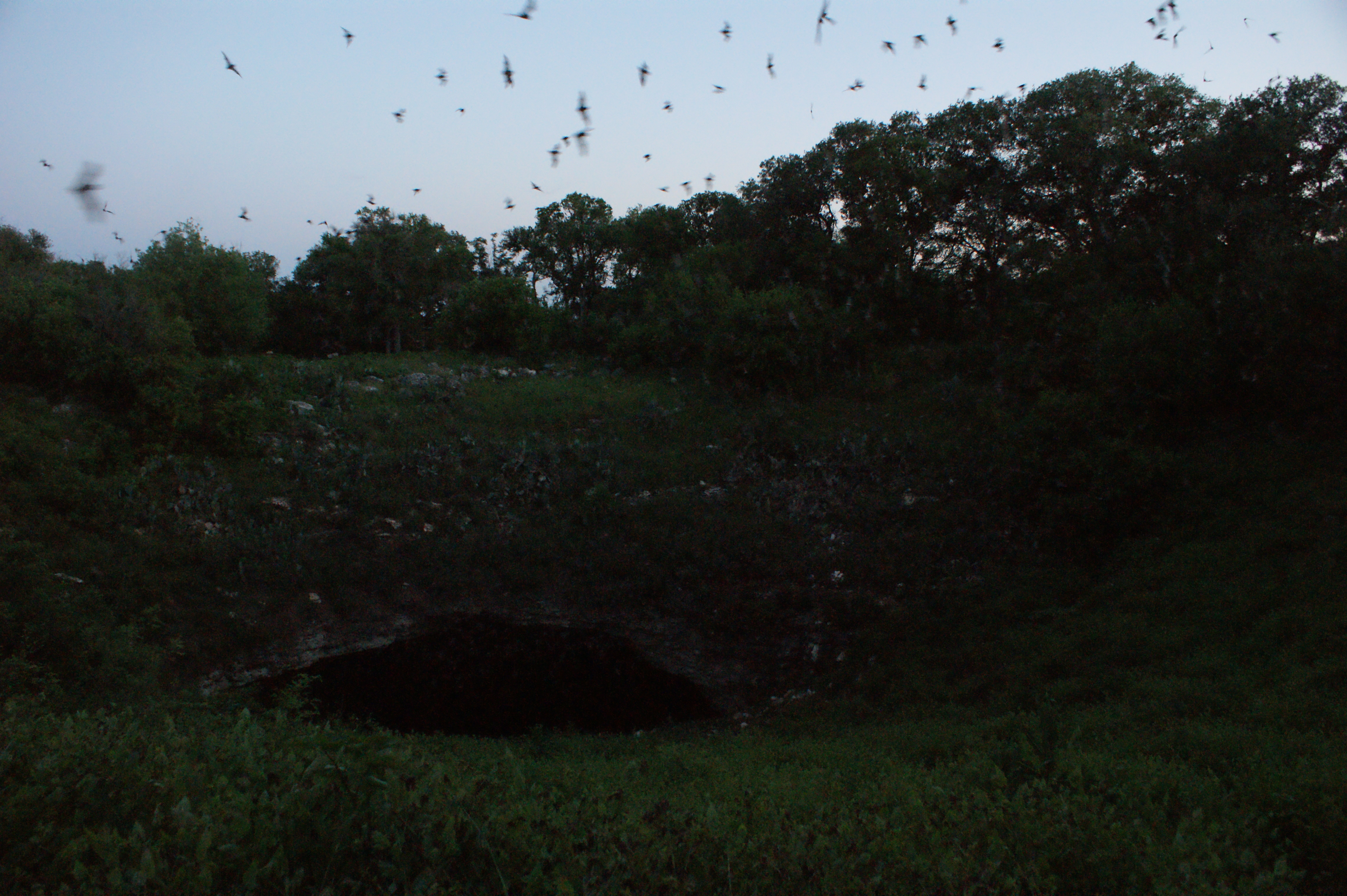
Bracken Bat Cave by day and night

Bracken is located on the International-Great Northern Railroad, 13.5 mi (21.7 km) southwest of New Braunfels in southern Comal County. It is considered a part of the Texas Hill Country and lies on the eastern bank of Cibolo Creek. It is on the former Farm to Market Road 1337 and Farm to Market Road 2252.

Bracken Cave is found near the town and is notable for housing the largest collection of Mexican free-tailed bats in the world, numbering 20 million in habitation during spring migration. As a result, the cave also holds the record for the largest known concentration of mammals in the world. These bats have ventured to the cave for 10,000 years, helping the local agrarian economy by controlling the insect population.

== Education ==
Following World War II, Davenport School, which educated the town's children, was consolidated with schools in Solms and Danville to create Comal Elementary School. Today, the community is served by the Comal Independent School District. It is zoned for Garden Ridge Elementary School, Danville Middle School, and Davenport High School.
