= Boerne City Lake =

Lake in Texas

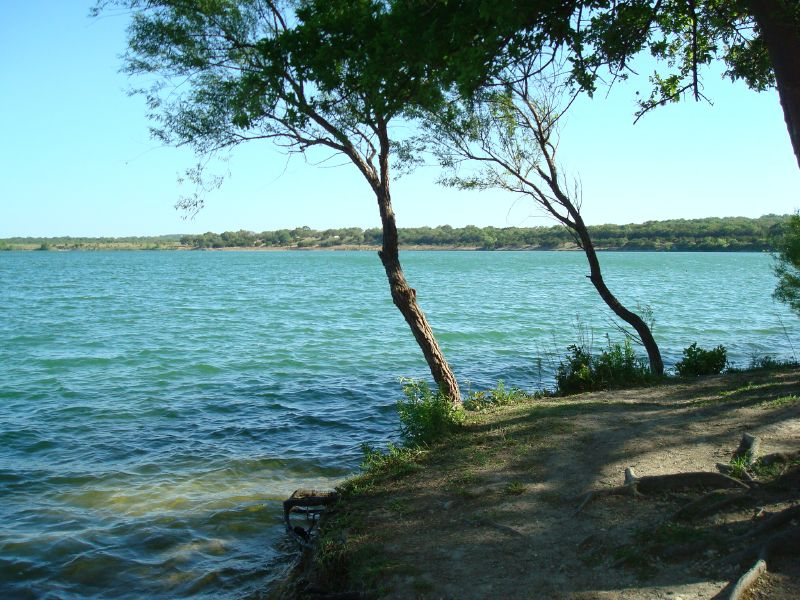
- Boerne City Lake
- Interactive map of Boerne City Lake
- Coordinates: 29°49′28″N 98°46′23″W

Boerne City Lake is a reservoir located in Boerne, Texas. The lake is situated west of U.S. Route 87. An unnamed dam impounds the water of Cibolo Creek on the northwest side of the city. The City of Boerne built the dam following approval granted by the Texas Water Commission in 1972 for flood control and municipal water supply. Boerne City Lake covers roughly 100 acres (40 ha) of water and reaches a maximum depth of about 42 feet (13 m) at full pool capacity. Available activities on the lake include swimming, kayaking, paddleboarding, and fishing.
