= Cibolo Creek =

Stream in South Central Texas

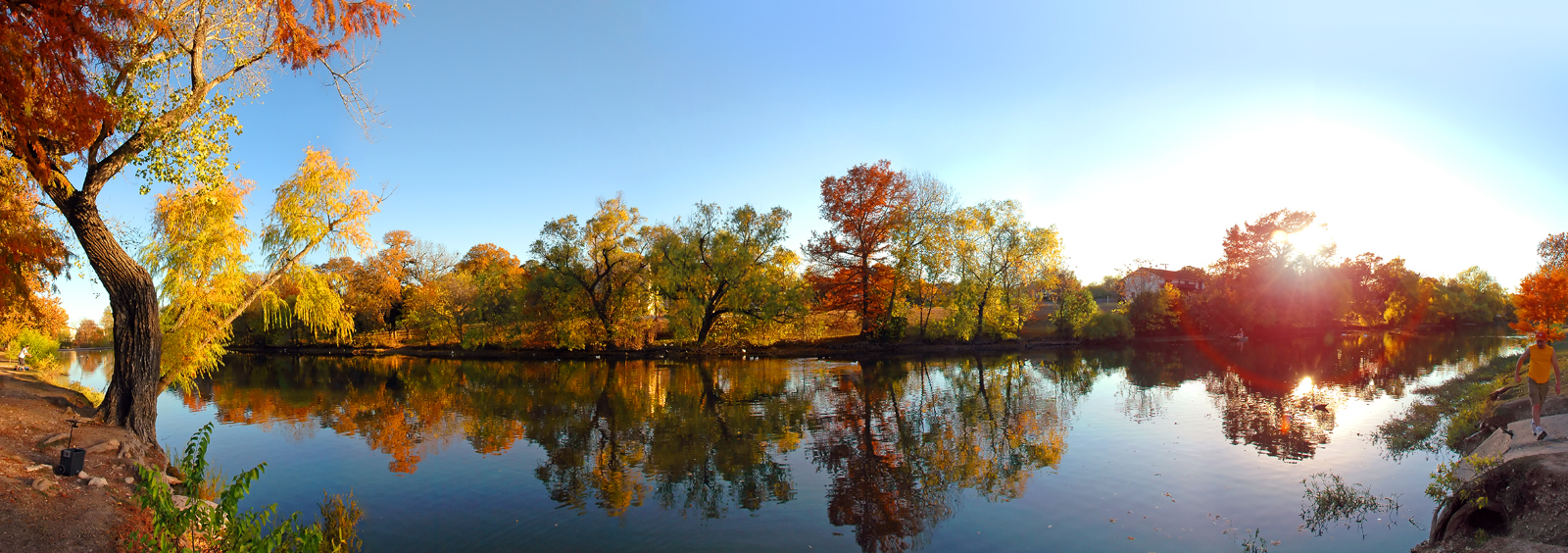
- Cibolo Creek in Boerne

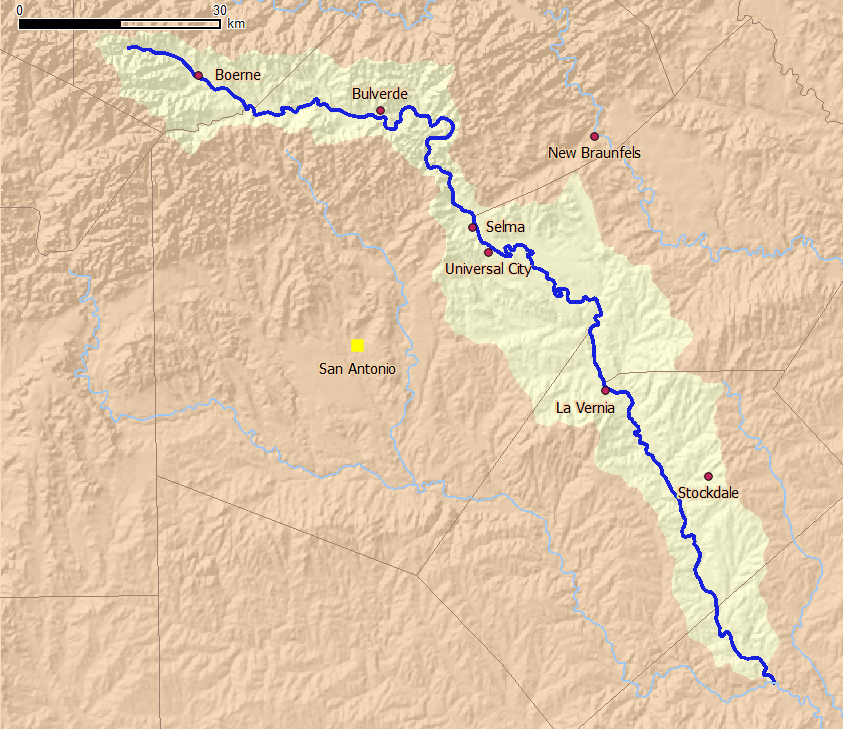
- Map of the Cibolo Creek watershed

Location
- Country: United States
- State: Texas

Physical characteristics
- Source: Turkey Knob
  - location: Boerne, Texas
  - coordinates: 29°50′18″N 98°53′10″W
  - elevation: 623 m (2,044 ft)
- Mouth: San Antonio River
  - location: Helena, Texas
  - coordinates: 28°57′11″N 97°52′24″W
  - elevation: 93 m (305 ft)
- Length: 154.497 km (96.000 mi)

Cibolo Creek (/ˈsɪbəˌloʊ/) is a stream in South Central Texas that runs approximately 96 miles (154 km) from its source at Turkey Knob (in the Texas Hill Country) near Boerne, Texas, to its confluence with the San Antonio River in Karnes County. The creek is a tributary of the San Antonio River, at the easternmost part of its watershed.

The stream is used for both recreational and cartographic purposes, serving as the eastern boundary of Bexar County, Texas. A wide variety of fish and other wildlife are known to occupy the waters, and several parks have been established along its banks, including Cibolo Nature Center, Boerne City Park and Jackson Nature Center. Additionally, numerous human settlements have been founded on the creek, such as Boerne, Fair Oaks Ranch, San Antonio, Bulverde, Bracken, Selma, Schertz, Universal City, Cibolo, Zuehl, New Berlin, La Vernia, Cestohowa, Kosciusko, Sutherland Springs and Panna Maria.

== Course ==
Cibolo Creek rises in the Texas Hill Country northwest of Boerne in Kendall County, Texas. Every second, approximately 30 cubic feet (850 L) of water pass through on its southeastern journey to the San Antonio River. It has been judged as a "scenic" and "picturesque" stream, especially in the upper reaches, as steady flows travel through deep canyons and rocky flats to form falls. Just ahead of its entry into Boerne, the stream is dammed to form Boerne City Lake, which provides drinking water for the town's residents. In Boerne, the creek flows through the center of town before reaching the Cibolo Nature Center, noted for its shores lined with bald cypress trees. East of the nature center, the Cibolo Canyonlands begin, which features even deeper canyons and direct groundwater recharge. Part of this area is protected by the University of Texas at San Antonio for environmental research purposes.

Further downstream, the creek passes through Fair Oaks Ranch and Bulverde. The steady flow begins to dissipate in certain areas as it approaches Camp Bullis in northern San Antonio, leaving dry patches that reveal a rocky bottom. Such dry patches continue as it heads east, forming the boundary between Bexar and Comal Counties. Steady flows pick up on the boundary between Bexar and Guadalupe Counties, passing through Randolph Air Force Base.

At its lower reaches, the terrain grows flatter and less rocky, supporting oak, mesquite and juniper. As it meanders through Wilson and Karnes Counties, passing Zuehl, New Berlin, La Vernia, Sutherland Springs, and Cestohowa, Cibolo Creek meets with the San Antonio River near the ghost town of Helena.

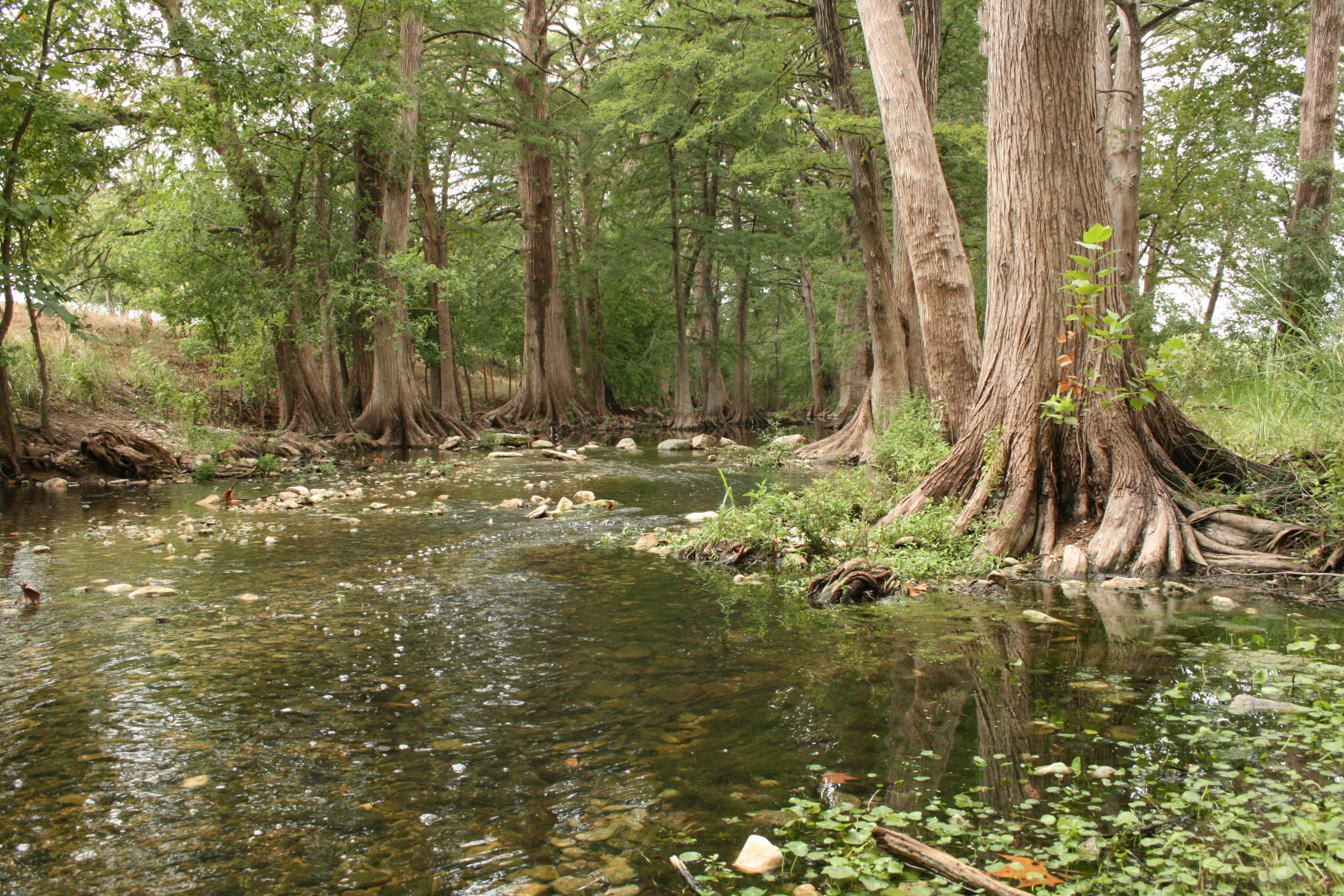
Cibolo Creek at Cibolo Nature Center

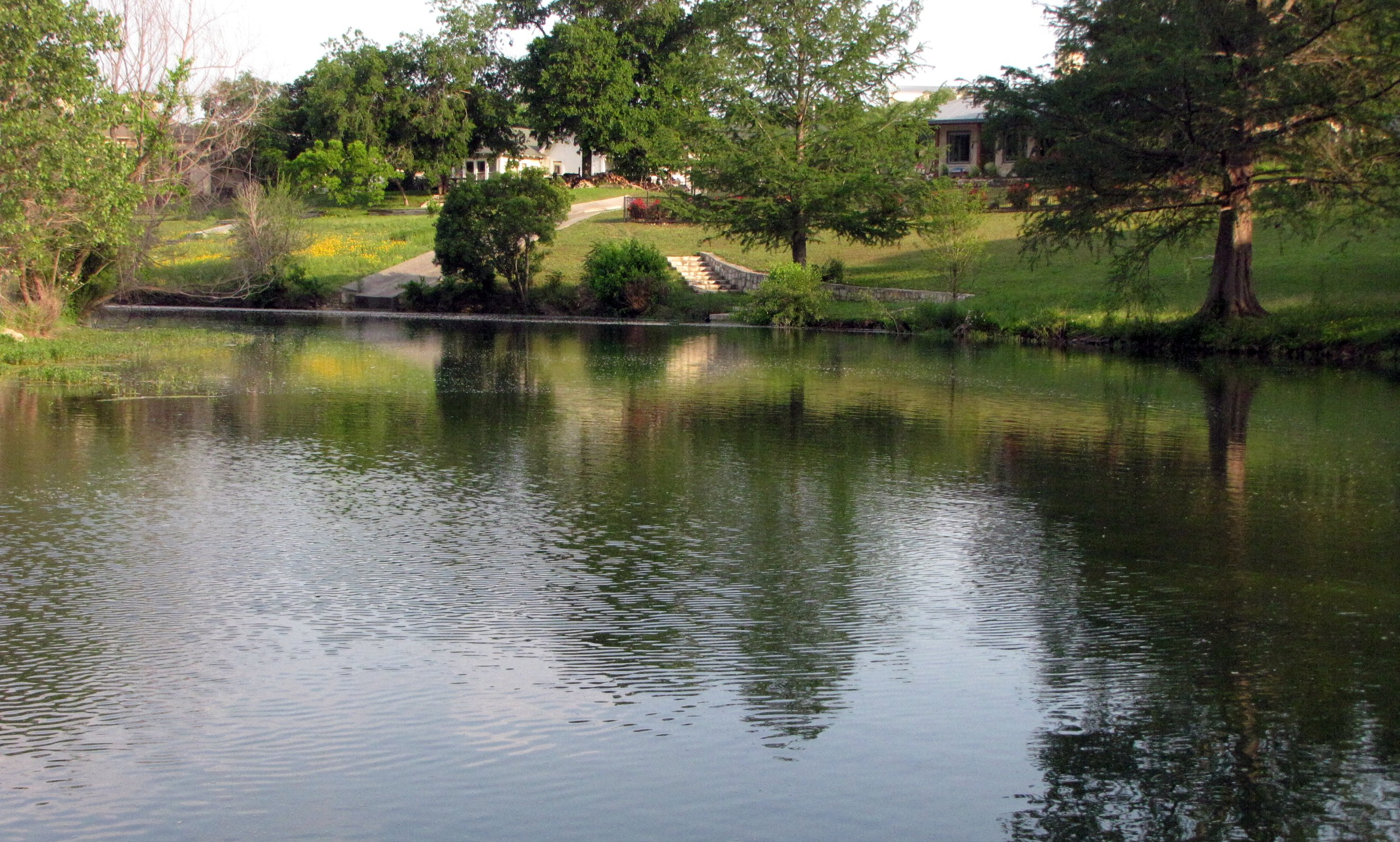
Cibolo Creek in Boerne, Texas

Cibolo Creek in Universal City, Texas

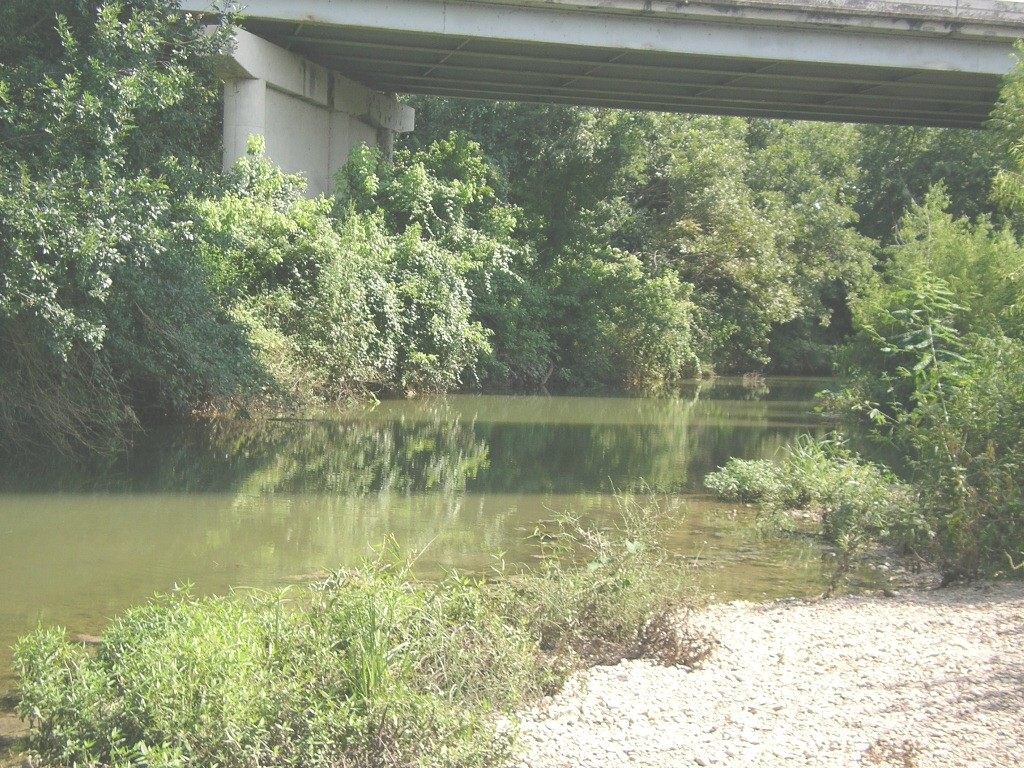
Cibolo Creek at IH-10 near Zuehl, Texas

== Watershed ==
Video essay of Cibolo Creek

The drainage basin of Cibolo Creek is located in the lower reaches of the Cretaceous Glen Rose Formation along the southeastern edge of the Edwards Plateau. Many springs located in the upper and middle reaches of the watershed engage in karst activity in the limestone prevalent below the surface, forming such caves as Cascade Caverns and Natural Bridge Caverns. An exchange occurs between the stream and these numerous underground springs that serve as a recharge for the Edwards-Trinity aquifer system. This system provides drinking water for millions of people in the surrounding area. Near the recharge zone, distributaries of the creek have carved deep canyons in the landscape of the Texas Hill Country, forming what is known as the Cibolo Canyonlands. The Cibolo Nature Center claims 1,300 acres (5.3 km^{2}; 2.0 sq mi) of the watershed, to protect the water quality from the hazards of rapid development and population growth.

Several streams serve as distributaries and tributaries of Cibolo Creek, and are included in the watershed. Balcones Creek, a 13 miles (21 km) long stream that rises in Bandera County and acts as the boundary between Bexar and Kendall Counties, is a main tributary of Cibolo Creek that converges at the meeting of Bexar, Kendall and Bandera Counties. Tributaries in the lower watershed include Martinez Creek, a 16 miles (26 km) long stream with a Mesquite tree-supporting bed of clay and sandy loam, located near Windcrest in eastern Bexar County; and Santa Clara Creek, 19.5 miles (31.4 km) long and Elm Creek, 14 miles (23 km) long, both streams in Guadalupe County near New Berlin that supports conifers along their shores. Additional tributaries include Alum Creek, and Elm Creek.

== History ==
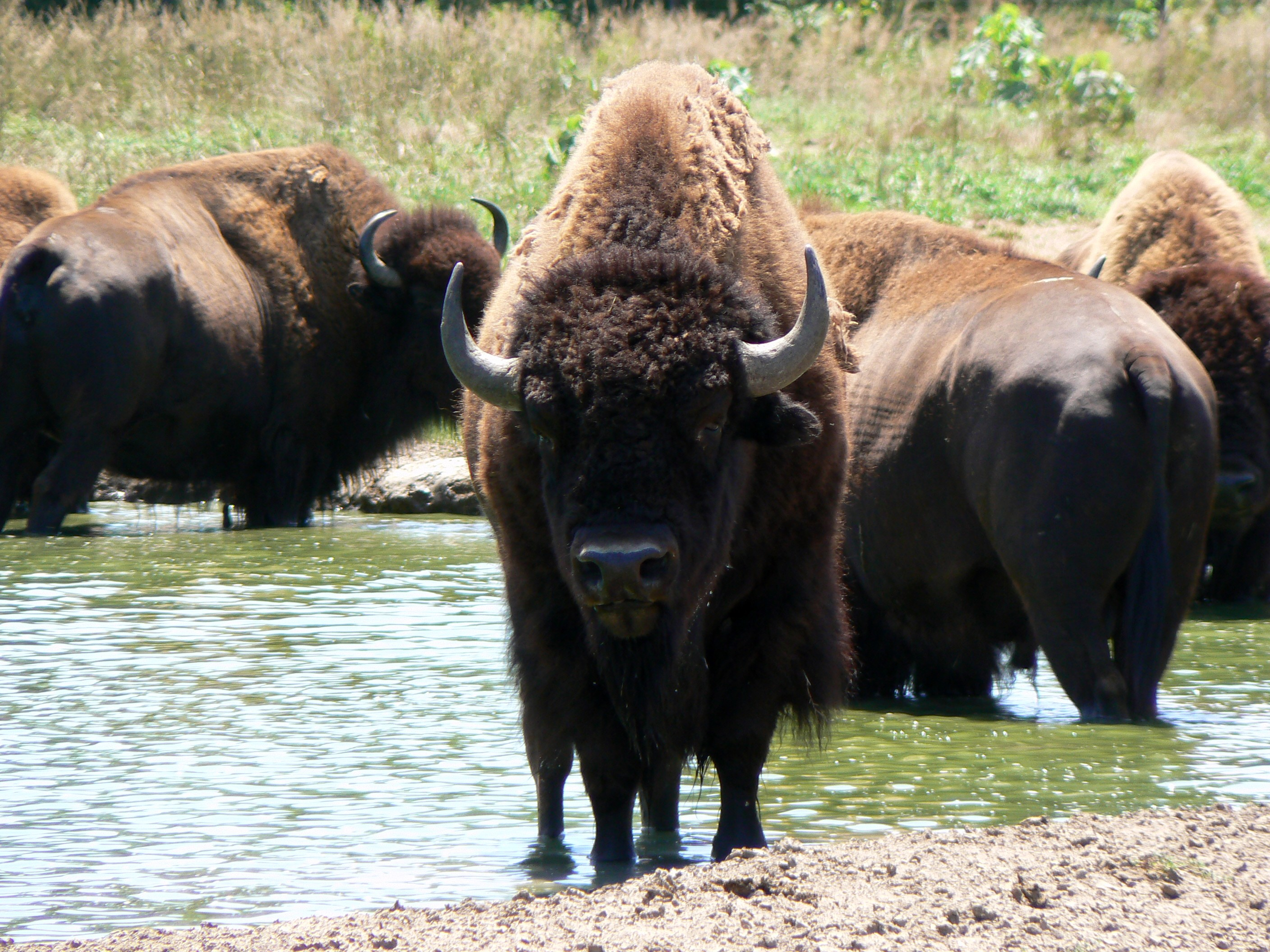
The American bison, from which the name Cibolo is derived

Prior to European settlement, Cibolo Creek was referred to as Xoloton by the Coahuiltecan Indians. The Tonkawa called it Bata Coniquiyoqui, as noted by Father Damian Massanet, who referred to the creek as Santa Crecencia in 1691. It is thought that Coahuila Governor Alonso de Leon had one of the earliest encounters with the creek in 1689 while on the first Spanish entrada to explore the French-claimed lands believed to lie beyond the Nueces River. Records suggest a camp was set up on the creek, identified as Arroyo del Leon, coined from the discovery of a dead mountain lion along the banks. Explorer Domingo Terán de los Ríos named the creek San Ygnacio de Loyola in 1691 during an expedition and Domingo Ramón referred to it as San Xavier in 1716. The first known use of the term Cibolo came from Marqués de San Miguel de Aguayo who identified the stream as Río Cibolo, or Cibolo River, in 1721. Cibolo is a Spanish and Native American term for American bison (buffalo), which used to inhabit the area. The Native Americans are believed to have used the steeply banked bluffs along the creek as hunting grounds, chasing herds of buffalo into the bed where the creatures would fall to their deaths.

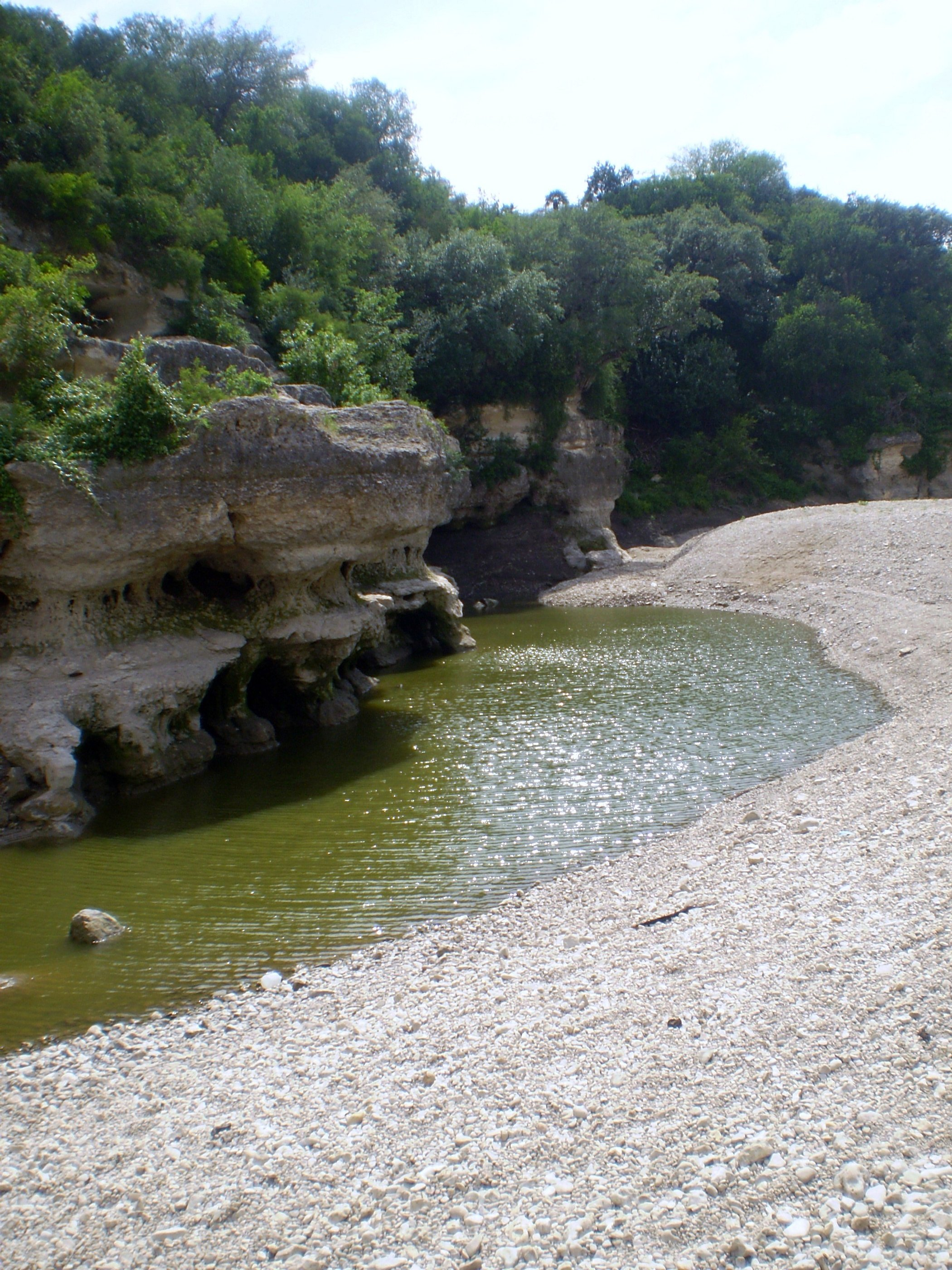
Steep banks, such as these in Universal City are believed to have been used by Native Americans to hunt buffalo.

Marqués de Rubí included Cibolo Creek in his 1768 list of potential sites for posts to solidify the Spanish hold on Texas, and a fort called El Fuerte de Santa Cruz del Cíbolo, built along the banks of Cibolo Creek in 1734 to protect livestock from Apache Indian attacks, was resurrected in 1771. However, the fort near Cestohowa was destroyed without a trace in 1782. and eventually the Spanish lost the creek and Texas following the Mexican Revolution. During the Texas Revolution, the creek was the site of two separate skirmishes. First, in October 1835, at the beginning of the war, Captain Ben Milam was dispatched by Stephen F. Austin to survey the unfamiliar territory toward Cibolo Creek. Milam set up camp and soon discovered the tracks of a Mexican force of about a hundred cavalrymen. Austin sent additional scouts, and one group was confronted by about ten advancing Mexican patrols. The group's lieutenant led an offensive against the patrols, and forced the Mexicans to retreat to San Antonio, allowing the Texans to march to Salado Creek. One Austin aide remarked: "this little skirmish...had a happy effect in the army...[and] was regarded as a favorable omen." The second skirmish occurred in April 1836, outside Camp Houston, a post established by Juan Seguín on the creek banks near present-day Stockdale. Seguín set the post after being ordered to withdraw from San Antonio, with a regiment that severely lacked resources, including clothing and horses. During an exploration of the creek to find wild horses, Seguín and six men met some hostile Tonkawas. In a brief skirmish, two of the Native Americans were killed, allowing Seguín and his men to return to camp with two additional horses.

Also in 1836 at the time of the Battle of the Alamo, during the Texas Revolution, the creek was the site of the temporary camps of the Alamo relief forces. On February 28, Juan Seguin and his reorganized relief forces, waiting on the Cibolo Creek, encountered Fannin's advance from Goliad led by Francis L. DeSauque and John Chenoweth, while near the Cibolo. On February 29, the relief forces from Gonzales traveling with the Gonzales Company of Mounted Volunteers arrived at the Cibolo and entered the Alamo the next day. On March 7, Gonzales relief force and former Alamo commander, James C. Neill with Edward Burleson gathered 50 men and headed for the Alamo. They reached the Cibolo and were heading for the Alamo but were repulsed by Mexican cavalry.

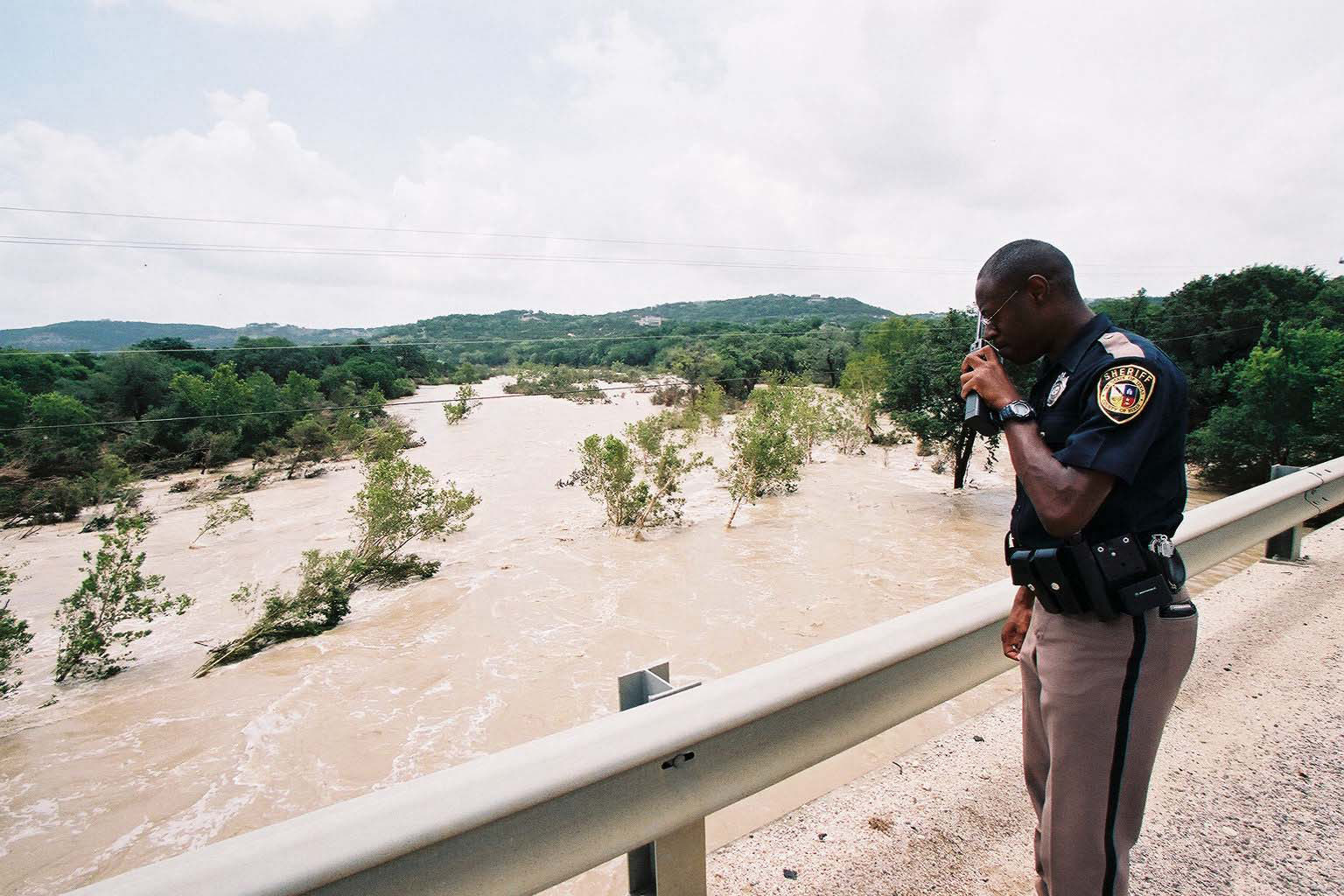
A police deputy stands before a flooded Cibolo Creek in July 2002.

In the late 1840s and early 1850s, the communities of Selma, Sutherland Springs, Boerne, La Vernia, and Bulverde were established along the creek. Later on, Cibolo Schertz, and Universal City were founded. These settlements dealt with torrential floods that cost many their homes and lives in later years. The destruction was prominently witnessed during the October 1998 Central Texas floods, and four years later during the flood of July 2002. The San Antonio River Authority authorized $114,599 to help clean debris from the creek in 2003, hoping to improve water quality. Above-average levels of bacteria have been found in certain areas of the creek, leading to such initiatives as the Upper Cibolo Watershed Protection plan, which began in 2010. Another plan to create a Cibolo Reservoir near Stockdale aimed to control flooding and provide fresh water met fierce opposition from local citizens concerned about the destruction of historic sites along the creek, and the loss of taxable land.

== Recreation ==
Several areas along the creek have been established for recreational use. Boerne City Park provides trails for hiking, nature walks and horseback riding, and is a part of the larger Cibolo Nature Center. Camp Bullis, a military training ground found along the stream in north Bexar County, allows hunting for deer and other game, as well as separate locations for archery and fishing. An 18-mile (29 km) section of the creek, between Oak Village North and Luxello, is classified as a class two whitewater flow. The area is a popular camping destination, and is ideal for whitewater rafting and kayaking. Additional locations include Universal City Cibolo Creek Preserve area, where a frisbee golf course has been established for play. Between Stockdale and Floresville, Cibolo Creek forms the eastern boundary of Jackson Nature Park, a 50-acre (200,000 m^{2}) public park owned by Wilson County and operated by the San Antonio River Authority. The park offers a looped trail network showcasing south-central Texas plants, animals, and geology.

Several locations are available for fishing. According to Texas Parks and Wildlife, the following fish have been caught in the stream: largemouth bass, bluegill, channel catfish, Rio Grande cichlid, longnose gar, green sunfish, sunfish hybrid, redbreast sunfish, and redear sunfish.

== Climate ==
The climate in this area is characterized by hot, humid summers and generally mild to cool winters. According to the Köppen Climate Classification system, Cibolo Creek has a humid subtropical climate, abbreviated "Cfa" on climate maps.

== See also ==
- List of rivers of Texas

== Bibliography ==
- Bandelier, Adolph (1890). Hemenway southwestern archaeological expedition: Contributions to the history of the southwestern portion of the United States. J. Wilson and son.
- Daniel, Stephen Hartley (2004). Texas Whitewater. United States: Self-published.
- Foster, William (1995). Spanish expeditions into Texas, 1689-1768. Austin, Texas: University of Texas Press. ISBN 0-292-72489-6.
- Hardin, Stephen L. (1994). Texian Iliad: A Military History of the Texas Revolution. Austin, Texas: University of Texas Press. ISBN 0-292-73086-1.
- Moore, Stephen (2002). Savage Frontier: Rangers, Riflemen, and Indian Wars in Texas. Vol. 1. Denton, Texas: University of North Texas Press. p. 242. ISBN 978-1-57441-235-2.
- Morgenthaler, Jefferson (October 3, 2005). Boerne: Settlement on the Cibolo. Great Texas Books. ISBN 978-1-932801-08-8.
- Tarpley, Fred (1980). 1001 Texas Place Names. Austin, Texas: University of Texas Press. ISBN 0-292-76016-7.
