= October 1998 Central Texas floods =

Flood event in Texas

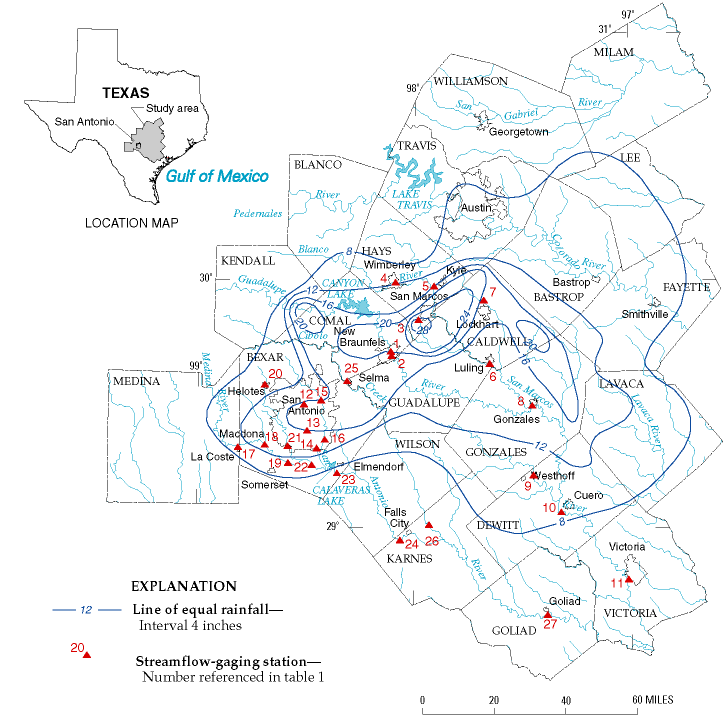
- Estimated rainfall totals from the United States Geological Survey.
- Location: South Texas, Southeast Texas

Meteorological history
- Date: October 17, 1998

Overall effects
- Fatalities: 31
- Damage: $750 million

The October 1998 Texas Flooding was a flood event that occurred across parts of South Texas and Southeast Texas on the weekend of October 17 and October 18, 1998. The storm that caused it was one of the costliest in the recorded meteorological history of the United States, bringing rainfall of over 20 inches (510 mm) to some parts of Southeast Texas and causing over US$750 million in damages. 31 people were killed as a result of the storm, mostly from drowning.

== Meteorological synopsis ==
The storm was created when a very strong upper-level trough approached from the Western United States and collided with very warm, moist air which had been sitting over Southern Texas for the past few days. This caused dew points in the area to be in the mid 70s that weekend. Also, an area of very warm and moist air was present nearby due to Hurricane Madeline, which was sitting off the west coast of Mexico. On October 16, the storm was being forecast by the National Weather Service to produce a significant amount of rain, and was only missing one ingredient for it to be a disastrous storm. The missing ingredient was a cold front, and one was moving steadily across the Western United States. Forecasters predicted that if this were to arrive at the same time as the rain, there would be heavy rain and possibly flooding. At 3:30 AM Central Standard Time, the National Weather Service in New Braunfels, Texas issued a flash flood watch for all counties in South, South-Central, and Southeast Texas.

Between the hours of midnight and 4 A.M. on October 17, 1998, small clusters of rain showers and thunderstorms began to form over Southern Texas very far ahead of the approaching cold front. For the next few hours, storms did not organize much into powerful clusters until the convection formed over the northern part of Bexar County, Texas, which included the city of San Antonio. After this formation, the storms rapidly increased in formation and power until the cold front arrived. The convection spread very quickly into other counties after this intensification. These counties included Travis, which included the city of Austin, Texas. The cold front would soon arrive to the area, bringing torrential rains.

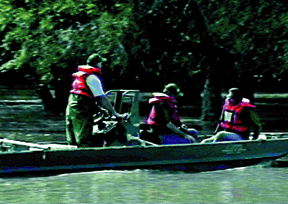
Rescuers cross a flooded road in a following the rain event.

The cold front arrived in Southern and Southeastern Texas on the evening of Saturday, October 17, 1998. This caused the storm to rapidly intensify until the torrential downpours began over the entire area. This started to flood many rivers and other bodies of water in the area, including the San Marcos River, the Guadalupe River, Canyon Lake, and the Medina River. The rainfall caused widespread flash flooding across the urban area of San Antonio and the city of Austin. Heavy rains continued for the entire day of October 18, 1998, and eventually tapered off and moved away to the coast and soon offshore. It caused major flooding in seven different river basins, and drained nearly 10,000 square miles (26,000 km^{2}). The rain caused record rain totals in fifteen bodies of water, as recorded by the United States Geological Survey.

== Impact ==
The flood event impacted many areas, mostly in Southern Texas. Also affected were Southeast Texas and South Central Texas, and there was minor flooding along the coast of the state.

=== Central Texas ===
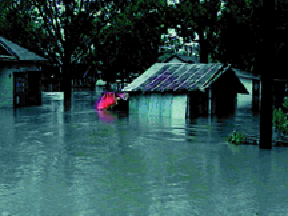
Flood damage in Southern Texas

The greatest impact was in Southern Texas, which included the urban areas of San Antonio and Austin, and all of their surrounding suburbs. The counties with the most significant rainfall, damage, and fatalities were Travis County, Bexar County, Guadalupe County, and Caldwell County. This area included both the cities of San Antonio and Austin. In a small area in Caldwell County, there was 29 inches (740 mm) of rain estimated by the United States Geological Survey. This included the area of Luling, Texas, which was badly flooded by the storm due to its close proximity to the San Marcos River. Most of the county picked up an estimated 20–30 inches of rain, including San Marcos, Texas, New Braunfels, Texas, and Kyle, Texas.

== Fatalities ==
31 people were killed as a result of the flooding across nine different counties and 24 separate incidents in South, Southeast, and South-Central Texas. 29 of these deaths were caused directly from the storm, and two were caused indirectly. Of the 31 deaths, 24 (or 77%) were caused by drowning. Of the deaths caused by drowning, 22 of them were caused by a driver driving their vehicle into high water on a road flooded by the torrential downpours. There were 16 different incidents when these types of deaths occurred, four of them involving in multiple deaths. 63% of these incidents involved a truck, van, or sport utility vehicle. Other deaths included three cardiac arrests, three incidents of multiple trauma, and one death caused by hypothermia after being submerged in the water.

== Flooding data ==
Source: Kelly 1999, pp. A1–A2

Water body	Location	Peak water height (feet)	Notes
Cypress Creek	Hockley, Texas	63.51	Highest creek stage since 1960.
Onion Creek	Driftwood, Texas	24.91	Highest creek stage since records began.
Sandy Creek	Leander, Texas	24.91	Highest creek stage since records began.
Plum Creek	Luling, Texas	32.70	Highest Creek stage since records began in 1915.
Guadalupe River	New Braunfels, Texas	35.08	
Guadalupe River	Seguin, Texas	36.80	Highest previous record 35.5 feet in 1935.
Guadalupe River	Gonzales, Texas	50.44	Highest river stage since records began in 1905.
Guadalupe River	Cuero, Texas	49.80	Highest river stage since records began before 1900.
Guadalupe River	Victoria, Texas	49.80	Highest river stage since records began before 1840.
San Antonio River	San Antonio, Texas	12.43	Highest river stage since records began.
San Antonio River (Loop 410)	San Antonio, Texas	36.15	Highest river stage since records began.
Salado Creek	San Antonio, Texas	23.00	Highest creek stage since records began.
Leon Creek	San Antonio, Texas	28.52	Highest creek stage since records began.
San Antonio River	Elmendorf, Texas	64.20	Highest river stage since records began.
Cibolo Creek	Selma, Texas	35.40	Highest creek stage since records began.
Cibolo Creek	Falls City, Texas	40.00	Highest creek stage since records began.

== See also ==
- 1997 Red River flood
- Floods in the United States: 1901-2000
- Great Mississippi Flood of 1927
- Hurricane Madeline (1998)
- July 2025 Central Texas floods

== Bibliography ==
- Kelly, John J. Jr, ed. (February 1999). "South Texas Floods, October 17–22, 1998" (PDF). Service Assessment. Silver Spring, Maryland: National Oceanic and Atmospheric Administration, US Dpt of Commerce.
