= Cottonwood Creek (Wakenda Creek tributary) =

Stream in the American state of Missouri

Coordinates: 39.4519586°N 93.8229924°W

Cottonwood Creek is a stream in Ray County in the U.S. state of Missouri. It is a tributary of Wakenda Creek.

Cottonwood Creek was so named on account of cottonwood timber in the area.

== See also ==
- List of rivers of Missouri
