= Alum Creek (Cibolo Creek tributary) =

Stream in Wilson County, Texas, U.S.

Coordinates: 29°15′13″N 98°01′26″W

Alum Creek is a stream in Wilson County, Texas, in the United States. It is a tributary of Cibolo Creek.

Alum Creek was so named on account of the foul taste naturally occurring alum imparted in its water.

== See also ==
- List of rivers of Texas
