= Cottonwood Creek (Guadalupe County) =

Location
- Country: United States
- State: Texas

Physical characteristics
- Source
  - location: New Berlin, Texas
  - coordinates: 29°27′26″N 98°00′51″W
- Mouth: Guadalupe River
  - location: Seguin, Texas
  - coordinates: 29°31′37″N 97°56′12″W
  - elevation: 135 m (443 ft)

Cottonwood Creek is a stream in South Central Texas, United States that runs approximately 9 miles from its source five miles east of New Berlin, Texas (in the Texas Prairielands), to its confluence with the Guadalupe River in Guadalupe County, Texas, four miles southeast of Seguin. The creek serves as a tributary of the Guadalupe River and forms its watershed near Seguin, Texas. There is a separate Cottonwood Creek that flows through northern Guadalupe County before discharging into the San Marcos River above Kingsbury.

== History ==
Evidence of human use of Cottonwood Creek dates back over 11,000 years. To the early settlers around Seguin, the Cottonwood was first known as Shawnee Creek. In the early 1800s a tribe of friendly Shawnee lived near the settlement of Gonzales. They often traveled up the Guadalupe River in search of fresh game. While hunting near Seguin, they encountered a large band of their enemies, the Comanche. Upon sight a battled ensued and the Shawnee suffered greatly with two chiefs being killed. The Shawnee carried their chiefs to the mouth of Cottonwood Creek and buried them at a point that fronts the river. They returned to their homes and told the story of the battle to their allies in Gonzales. From this point, the Creek was known to the early settlers as Shawnee Creek.

== Recreation ==
Today, this magnificent watershed offers unlimited opportunities for primitive recreation, angling, and hunting. Nolte Island Recreation Area, a man-made island, fronts Cottonwood Creek near its mouth and is a popular destination for community gatherings. Pavilions are available for rent by the public for special occasions.

== Fauna ==
A wide variety of fish and other wildlife are known to occupy the region. The creek passes through rolling prairie that is surfaced by clay loams which support honey mesquite, wild orange, texana plum and natural grasses including "Texas spur".

== See also ==
- List of rivers of Texas
