= Marion Independent School District (Texas) =

School district in Texas

Address
- 211 West Otto Street Marion, Texas, 78124; United States

District information
- Type: Public
- Grades: PreK–12
- NCES District ID: 4829100

Students and staff
- Students: 1,483
- Teachers: 116.37 (FTE)
- Staff: 84.83 (FTE)
- Student–teacher ratio: 12.74

Other information
- Website: www.marionisd.net

Marion Independent School District is a public school district based in Marion, Texas (USA).

In addition to Marion, the district also serves the cities of Santa Clara and New Berlin as well as the community of Zuehl.

In 2009, the school district was rated "academically acceptable" by the Texas Education Agency.

== Schools ==
- Marion High School
- Marion Middle School
- Norma Krueger Elementary
