= Cottonwood Creek Bridge (Ismay, Montana) =

- U.S. National Register of Historic Places
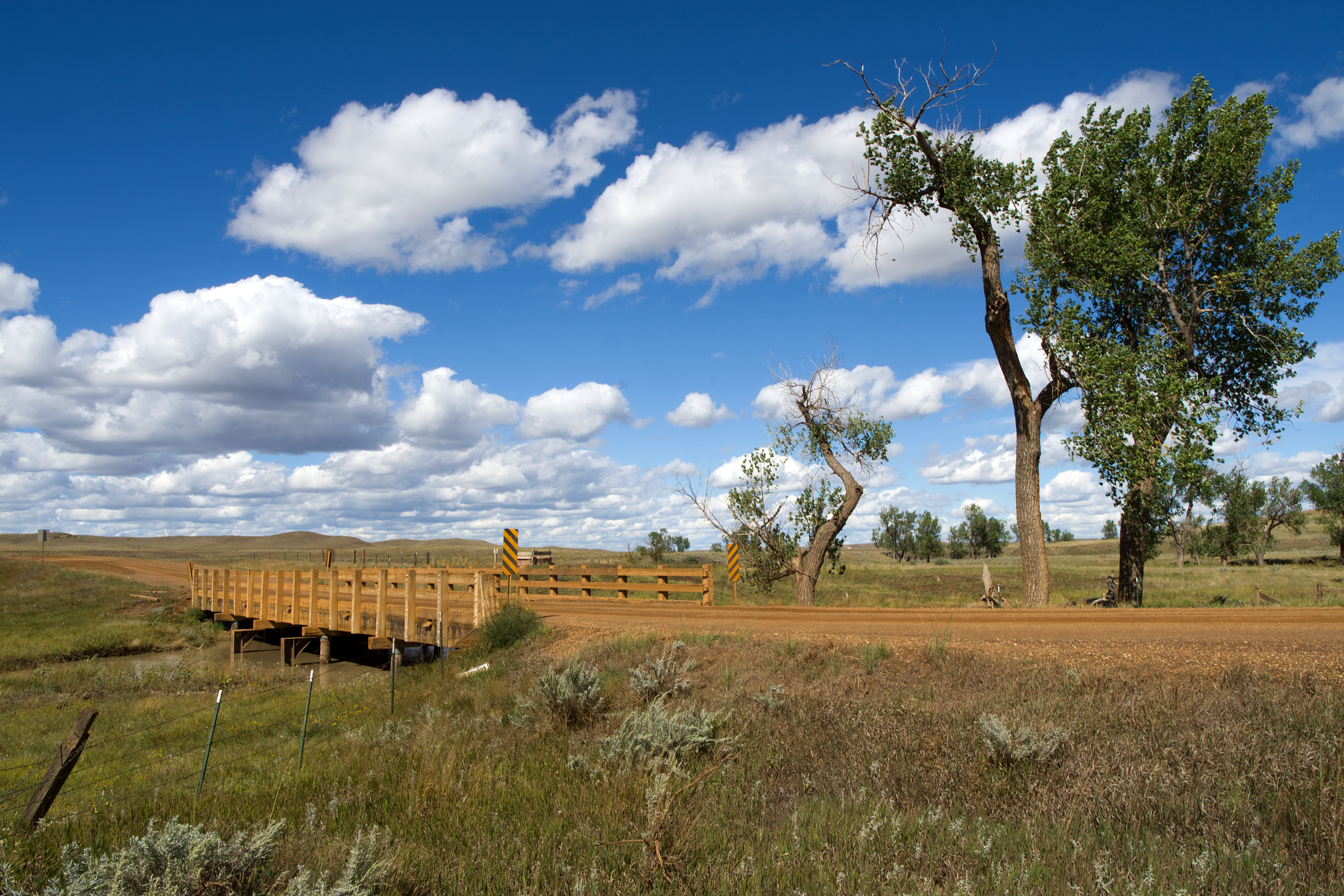
- Bridge in September 2016

- Location within Montana Location within the United States
- Location: Milepost 2.2 on Montana Secondary Highway 320 (Ismay Road), Fallon County, Montana, near Ismay
- Coordinates: 46.456637°N 104.788596°W
- Area: 1 acre (0.40 ha)
- Built by: Emil Prahl and Henry Sawtell
- Architect: Montana Highway Department
- MPS: Montana's Historic Timber Stringer Bridges, 1915-1960
- NRHP reference No.: 14000079
- Added to NRHP: March 14, 2015

The Cottonwood Creek Bridge is a bridge in Fallon County, Montana near the town of Ismay, built in 1934. It was listed on the National Register of Historic Places in 2014. From 1926 to 1941, at least 1,242 timber stringer bridges were built in Montana; this is one of very few intact surviving bridges.

It was listed as part of a statewide study of timber stringer bridges.

It was built by Emil Prahl and Henry Sawtell, both of Miles City, to the standardized plans provided by the Montana Highway Department, a predecessor agency to the Montana Department of Transportation. It is a five-span continuous treated timber stringer bridge which is 95 feet (29 m) long and 20 feet (6.1 m) wide with a roadway width of 19 feet (5.8 m). Its ends are supported by timber abutments and wingwalls braced with wood pilings. The spans are between four sets of treated timber pile bents made of Douglas fir.
