= Cottonwood Creek (Little Tabo Creek tributary) =

Stream in the U.S. state of Missouri

Coordinates: 39.1705702°N 93.6991060°W

Cottonwood Creek is a stream in Lafayette County in the U.S. state of Missouri. It is a tributary of Little Tabo Creek.

Cottonwood Creek was named for the cottonwood timber near its course.

== See also ==
- List of rivers of Missouri
