= Cottonwood Creek Archeological Site =

Cottonwood Creek Archeological Site may refer to:

- Cottonwood Creek Archeological Site (Homer, Alaska), listed on the National Register of Historic Places in Kenai Peninsula Borough, Alaska
- Cottonwood Creek Archeological Site (Belgrade, Nebraska), listed on the National Register of Historic Places in Nance County, Nebraska
