= New Berlin, Texas =

- City
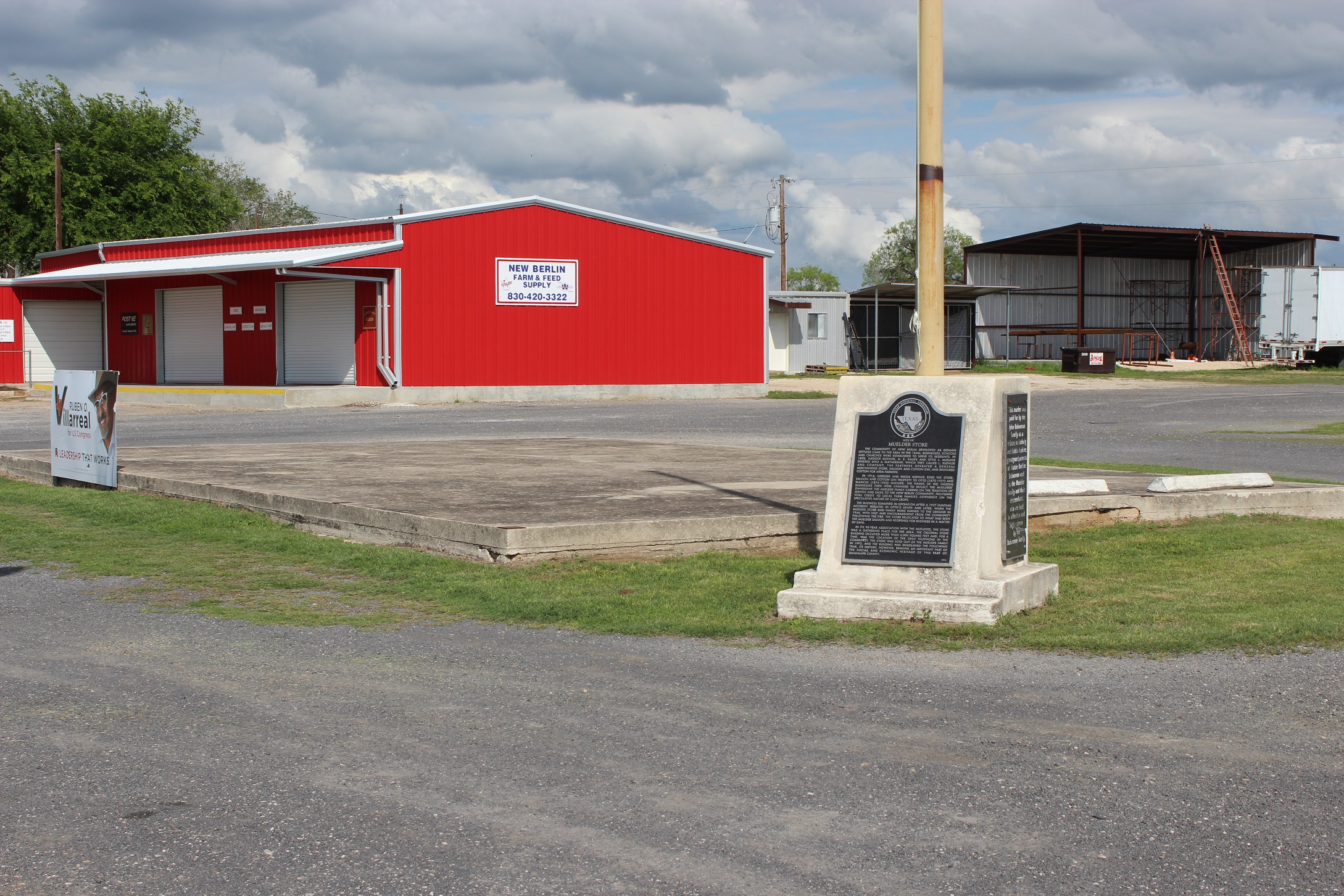

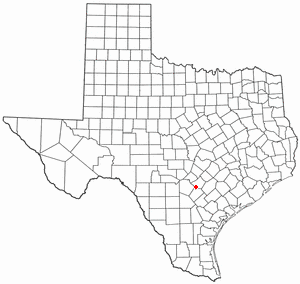
- Location of New Berlin, Texas

- Coordinates: 29°29′21″N 98°07′10″W
- Country: United States
- State: Texas
- County: Guadalupe

Area
  - Total: 9.63 sq mi (24.94 km^{2})
  - Land: 9.63 sq mi (24.94 km^{2})
  - Water: 0 sq mi (0.00 km^{2})
- Elevation: 584 ft (178 m)

Population (2020)
  - Total: 656
  - Density: 65/sq mi (25.1/km^{2})
- Time zone: UTC-6 (Central (CST))
  - Summer (DST): UTC-5 (CDT)
- FIPS code: 48-50796
- GNIS feature ID: 2411226
- Website: newberlintx.gov

New Berlin (/ˈbɜːrlɪn/ BUR-lin) is a city in Guadalupe County, Texas, United States. As of the 2020 census, New Berlin had a population of 656. New Berlin is a German-Texan town settled by German emigrants in the 1800s as a farming community. New Berlin is named after Berlin, Germany and boasts many residents being descendants of the original German founders.

== Geography ==
New Berlin is located in southwestern Guadalupe County to the east of Cibolo Creek. It is 13 miles (21 km) southwest of Seguin, the county seat, and 27 miles (43 km) east of downtown San Antonio.

According to the United States Census Bureau, New Berlin has a total area of 4.8 square miles (12.4 km^{2}), all land.

== History ==
New Berlin was founded in 1868 by German immigrants who came to the area. It was named after the German capital, Berlin. Carl August Edward "Ed" Tewes is considered the founding father. Sutherland Springs Church shooter Devin Kelley shot himself near the city after massacring 26 victims and being pursued by two armed townspeople. Historic Brietzke Station is now a barbecue restaurant.

== Demographics ==
Historical population
Census	Pop.	Note	%±
1980	253		—
1990	188		−25.7%
2000	467		148.4%
2010	511		9.4%
2020	656		28.4%
U.S. Decennial Census

=== 2020 census ===
As of the 2020 census, New Berlin had a population of 656. The median age was 50.7 years. 16.9% of residents were under the age of 18 and 27.3% of residents were 65 years of age or older. For every 100 females there were 98.2 males, and for every 100 females age 18 and over there were 98.2 males age 18 and over.

0.0% of residents lived in urban areas, while 100.0% lived in rural areas.

There were 264 households in New Berlin, of which 28.0% had children under the age of 18 living in them. Of all households, 65.2% were married-couple households, 15.2% were households with a male householder and no spouse or partner present, and 16.3% were households with a female householder and no spouse or partner present. About 19.3% of all households were made up of individuals and 13.6% had someone living alone who was 65 years of age or older.

There were 280 housing units, of which 5.7% were vacant. The homeowner vacancy rate was 0.0% and the rental vacancy rate was 0.0%.

Racial composition as of the 2020 census
Race	Number	Percent
White	576	87.8%
Black or African American	5	0.8%
American Indian and Alaska Native	8	1.2%
Asian	1	0.2%
Native Hawaiian and Other Pacific Islander	0	0.0%
Some other race	14	2.1%
Two or more races	52	7.9%
Hispanic or Latino (of any race)	73	11.1%

=== 2000 census ===
As of the census of 2000, there were 467 people, 167 households, and 135 families residing in the city. The population density was 164.1 inhabitants per square mile (63.4/km^{2}). There were 178 housing units at an average density of 62.6 per square mile (24.2/km^{2}). The racial makeup of the city was 98.07% White, 0.64% Native American, 0.86% from other races, and 0.43% from two or more races. Hispanic or Latino of any race were 7.28% of the population.

There were 167 households, out of which 42.5% had children under the age of 18 living with them, 70.1% were married couples living together, 8.4% had a female householder with no husband present, and 18.6% were non-families. 18.0% of all households were made up of individuals, and 8.4% had someone living alone who was 65 years of age or older. The average household size was 2.80 and the average family size was 3.16.

In the city, the population was spread out, with 29.1% under the age of 18, 5.6% from 18 to 24, 30.8% from 25 to 44, 22.5% from 45 to 64, and 12.0% who were 65 years of age or older. The median age was 37 years. For every 100 females, there were 93.8 males. For every 100 females age 18 and over, there were 99.4 males.

The median income for a household in the city was $52,250, and the median income for a family was $66,607. Males had a median income of $40,521 versus $29,688 for females. The per capita income for the city was $22,779. About 2.1% of families and 4.0% of the population were below the poverty line, including none of those under age 18 and 12.0% of those age 65 or over.

== Education ==
New Berlin is served by the Marion Independent School District.
