= Marion, Texas =

- City
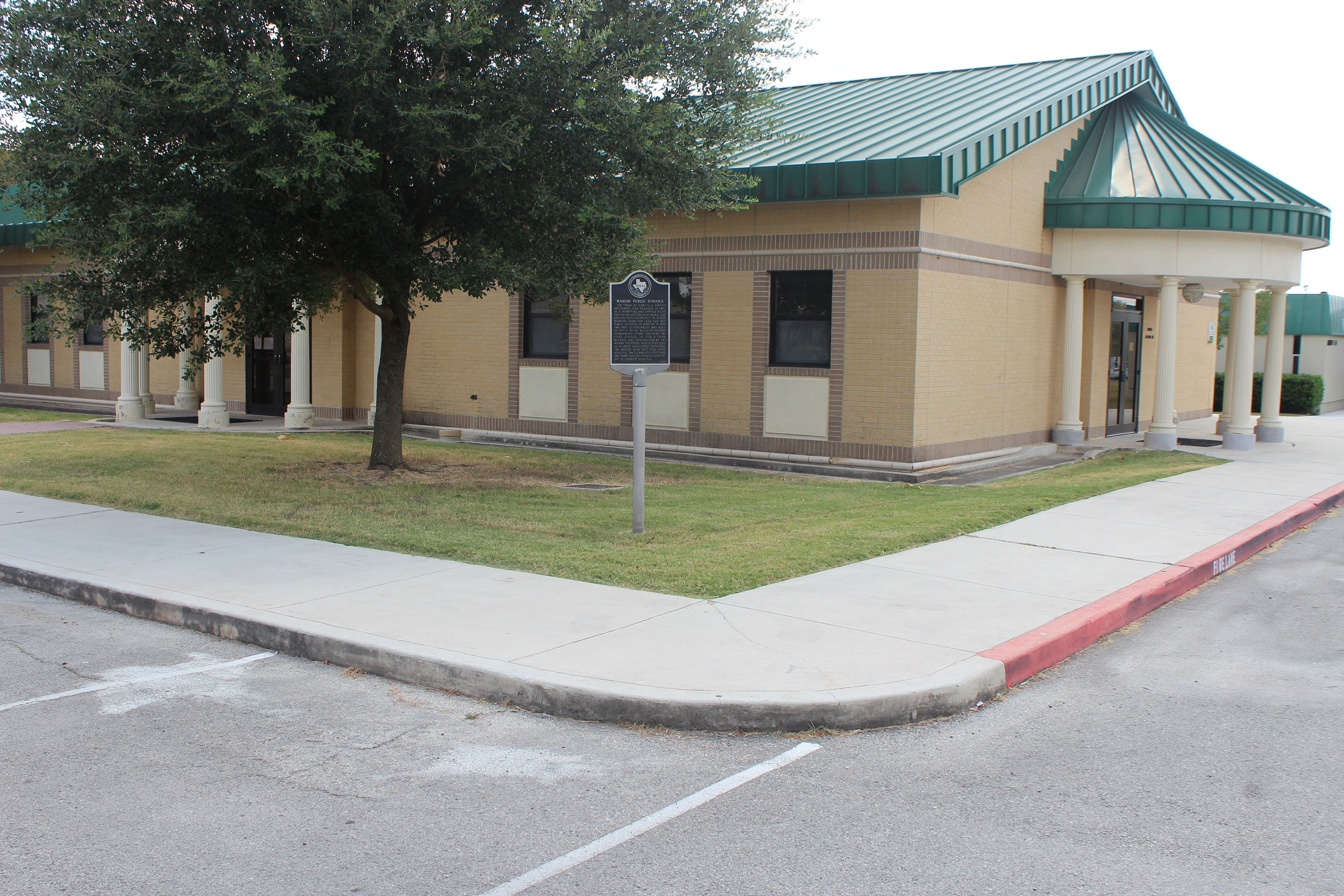
- Marion public library

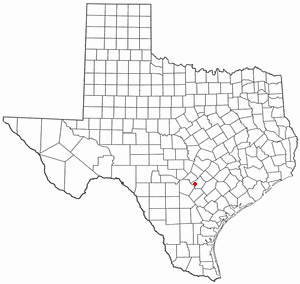
- Location of Marion, Texas

- Coordinates: 29°34′21″N 98°08′35″W
- Country: United States
- State: Texas
- County: Guadalupe

Area
  - Total: 0.78 sq mi (2.02 km^{2})
  - Land: 0.78 sq mi (2.02 km^{2})
  - Water: 0 sq mi (0.00 km^{2})
- Elevation: 650 ft (200 m)

Population (2020)
  - Total: 1,034
  - Density: 1,589/sq mi (613.5/km^{2})
- Time zone: UTC-6 (Central (CST))
  - Summer (DST): UTC-5 (CDT)
- ZIP code: 78124
- Area code: 830
- FIPS code: 48-46692
- GNIS feature ID: 2411036
- Website: cityofmariontx.org

Marion is a city in Guadalupe County, Texas, United States. The town was incorporated by 1941. The population was 1,034 at the 2020 census. It is part of the San Antonio Metropolitan Statistical Area.

== History ==
The town is named after Marion Dove, whose grandfather, Joshua W. Young, owned a plantation that the Galveston, Harrisburg and San Antonio Railway passed through in 1877.

== Geography ==
Farm to Market Road 78 passes through the center of town, leading west 26 miles (42 km) to San Antonio and east 12 miles (19 km) to Seguin, the Guadalupe County seat.

According to the United States Census Bureau, Marion has a total area of 0.77 square miles (2.0 km^{2}), all land.

Marion is a small town that has a 3A school (mascot is the Marion Bulldogs) and a few businesses, including a hardware store, meat market, gas stations and several restaurants.

== Demographics ==
Historical population
Census	Pop.	Note	%±
1880	90		—
1940	373		—
1950	439		17.7%
1960	557		26.9%
1970	655		17.6%
1980	674		2.9%
1990	984		46.0%
2000	1,099		11.7%
2010	1,066		−3.0%
2020	1,034		−3.0%
U.S. Decennial Census

=== 2020 census ===
As of the 2020 census, there were 1,034 people, 396 households, and 255 families residing in the city.

The median age was 40.0 years. 23.6% of residents were under the age of 18 and 17.8% of residents were 65 years of age or older. For every 100 females there were 95.5 males, and for every 100 females age 18 and over there were 93.6 males age 18 and over.

0.0% of residents lived in urban areas, while 100.0% lived in rural areas.

There were 396 households in Marion, of which 39.4% had children under the age of 18 living in them. Of all households, 43.2% were married-couple households, 18.9% were households with a male householder and no spouse or partner present, and 30.8% were households with a female householder and no spouse or partner present. About 23.0% of all households were made up of individuals and 9.8% had someone living alone who was 65 years of age or older.

There were 439 housing units, of which 9.8% were vacant. The homeowner vacancy rate was 2.0% and the rental vacancy rate was 5.5%.

Racial composition as of the 2020 census
Race	Number	Percent
White	609	58.9%
Black or African American	53	5.1%
American Indian and Alaska Native	3	0.3%
Asian	5	0.5%
Native Hawaiian and Other Pacific Islander	1	0.1%
Some other race	147	14.2%
Two or more races	216	20.9%
Hispanic or Latino (of any race)	481	46.5%

=== 2000 census ===
As of the census of 2000, there were 1,099 people in the city. The population density was 1,544.0 inhabitants per square mile (596.1/km^{2}). There were 393 housing units at an average density of 561.4 per square mile (216.8/km^{2}). The racial makeup of the city was 74.25% White, 6.01% African American, 1.09% Native American, 1.09% Asian, 16.01% from other races, and 1.55% from two or more races. Hispanic or Latino of any race were 37.22% of the population.

There were 393 households, out of which 43.7% had children under the age of 18 living with them, 59.6% were married couples living together, 18.1% had a female householder with no husband present, and 19.4% were non-families. 17.5% of all households were made up of individuals, and 6.7% had someone living alone who was 65 years of age or older. The average household size was 2.95 and the average family size was 3.32 which can be directly compared to the US's average household size of 2.59 and average family size of 3.14.

In the city, the population was spread out, with 30.9% under the age of 18, 7.8% from 18 to 24, 29.8% from 25 to 44, 20.4% from 45 to 64, and 11.1% who were 65 years of age or older. The median age was 34 years. For every 100 females, there were 96.3 males. For every 100 females age 18 and over, there were 84.7 males.

The median income for a household in the city was $36,635, and the median income for a family was $40,625. Males had a median income of $27,125 versus $21,771 for females. The per capita income for the city was $13,302. About 7.0% of families and 8.4% of the population were below the poverty line, including 9.7% of those under age 18 and 13.8% of those age 65 or over.

== Education ==
The city is served by the Marion Independent School District. A small portion is served by the Schertz-Cibolo-Universal City Independent School District.
