= Regulator–Moderator War =

19th-century feud in East Texas

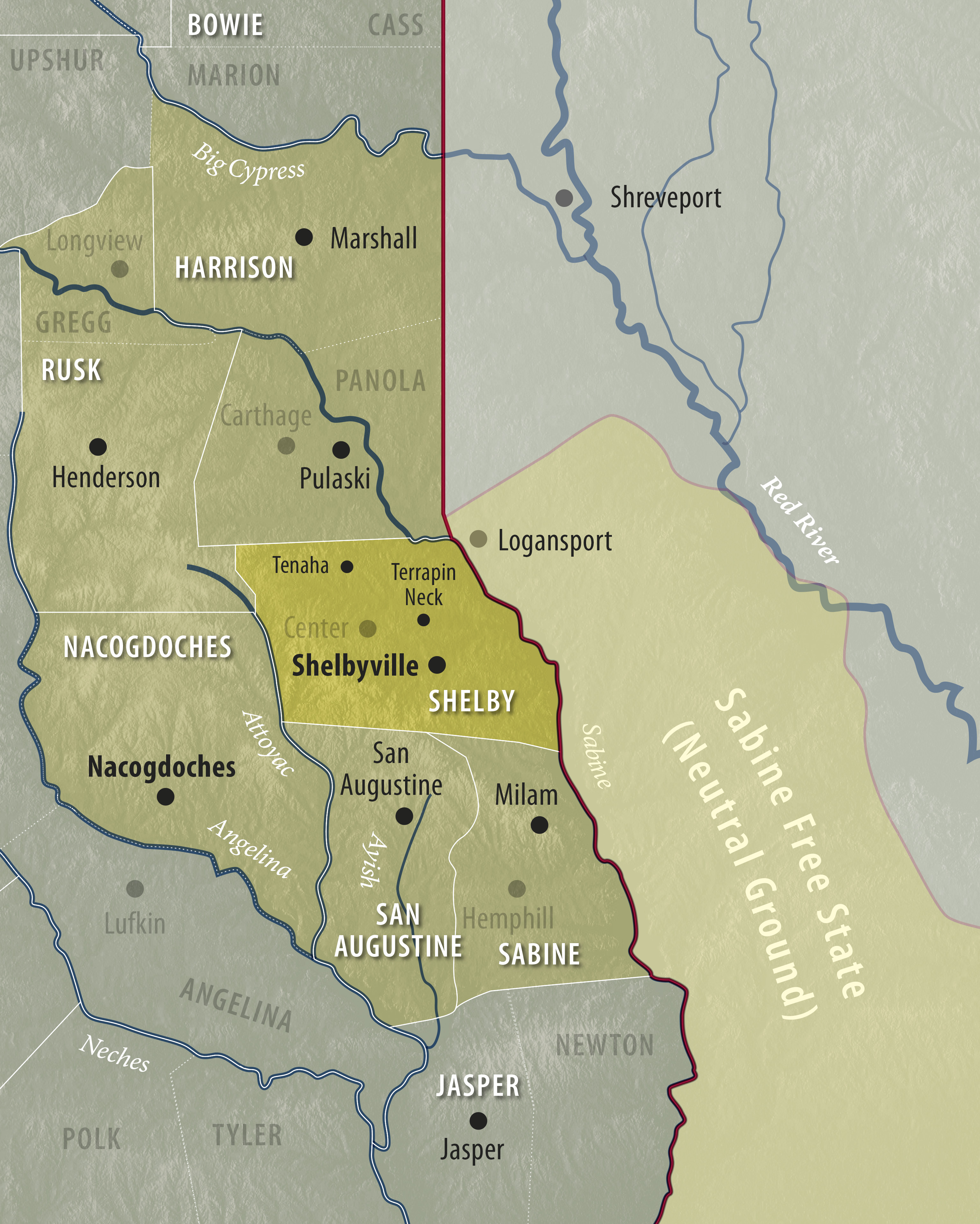
- Location
Date	1839–1844
Location	Shelby County and Harrison County, Republic of Texas 32°53′29″N 94°25′17″W
Result	Rebellion suppressed

Belligerents
Regulators	Moderators	Republic of Texas

Commanders and leaders
Charles W. Jackson †; Charles W. Moorman	Edward Merchant; John M. Bradley; James J. Cravens	(Texas) Sam Houston (Texas) John J. Kennedy

Casualties and losses
- 52 killed total 40 killed during the feud 12 more killed in the aftermath
- Location within Texas

The 1839–1844 Regulator–Moderator War, or the Shelby County War, was a nineteenth-century feud in East Texas during the Republic of Texas years between rival factions. The war started out as a dispute of land ownership before becoming a violent conflict for control of the local economy. Soon raids, livestock thievery and murders erupted in the region and took the lives of over forty men.

== Background ==
The United States and Spain ignored a strip of land between Spanish Texas and the Louisiana Territory (in what is now the U.S. state of Louisiana), because they were unable to agree on the boundary and did not want to go to war over it. The area, known as the Sabine Free State or the Neutral Ground, developed into a lawless patch that neither country controlled. The lawlessness spilled over into the adjacent portion of East Texas, still under Spanish control. Even after Spain and the United States signed the Adams–Onís Treaty (1819) and Mexico gained its independence (1821), little changed in regards to the region. After Texas won its independence from Mexico, the land remained wild and lawless.

== War ==
The Regulator–Moderator War was a land feud in Harrison and Shelby counties in East Texas from 1839 to 1844. The feud eventually involved Nacogdoches, San Augustine, and other East Texas counties.

The main leaders were Charles W. Jackson and Charles W. Moorman for the Regulators and Edward Merchant, John M. Bradley, and James J. Cravens for the Moderators. Their differences date back to land frauds, cattle rustling, barn burners, and revenge killings. Dozens had been killed over the years.

The conflict began over fraud, cattle rustling, and land swindling in the Neutral Ground, the lawless area in Louisiana between the American border and Mexican Texas. This conflict reached a boiling point after Charles W. Jackson, a former Mississippi riverboat captain and a fugitive from Louisiana justice, shot Joseph Goodbread at Shelbyville in 1840. Jackson soon organized a militia he named the Regulators to prevent "cattle rustling." In turn, the Moderators were organized by Edward Merchant to moderate the Regulators. When Charles Jackson went on trial on July 12, 1841, before Judge John M. Hansford, a friend of the Moderators and Goodbread, the Regulators intimidated the court so much that the trial could not proceed.

Open hostilities broke out, resulting in killings and house burnings. Jackson and a companion were later ambushed and killed by the Moderators, and Charles Moorman replaced Jackson as leader of the Shelby County Regulators. Moorman, who may have been wanted for forgery in Mississippi, led a party to avenge Jackson and Lauer. They surprised the assassins 25 miles (40 km) north of Crockett. The McFaddens were tried in Shelbyville in October 1841 for the Jackson-Lauer killing and were hanged with the exception of the youngest brother.

In the summer of 1844, the Moderators met at Bells Springs and renamed themselves the Reformers. They excluded Bradley and elected James J. Cravens as their leader. They determined to occupy Shelbyville. Republic of Texas president Sam Houston grew tired of the lawless fighting and attempted to settle the matter. He sent George W. Terrell to investigate the mayhem. Terrell wrote to Houston, "It really appears to me as if society were about to dissolve itself into its original elements."

On 14 August 1844 Houston ordered Travis G. Broocks and Alexander Horton to lead 500 militia into East Texas and make peace between the factions. Broocks was immediately arrested and held, but soon released. Exasperated, Houston rode to East Texas and set up headquarters the last two weeks in August at San Augustine to take charge. Though there was resistance between the two sides, through his diplomacy of fairness and even-handedness Houston was able to get the factions to sign a peace treaty. The feuding groups signed a truce on July 24, 1844, which protected "good and unoffending citizens."

== Aftermath ==
Texas history states that the feud officially ended in the year 1844 after the leaders were captured by the Texas government, but many more acts of violence and killings between the two factions continued for several years. In 1847 for example, a Moderator partisan named Wilkerson held a wedding party for his daughter and invited some of the Regulators. Unbeknownst to the latter, the refreshments that were served to them were poisoned, and after the party, over 60 of them got sick and about 10 of them died. The gruesome act led the Regulators to retaliate; capturing and lynching Wilkerson afterwards. It was only the Mexican–American War that would make the two set aside their differences, when they joined Captain L. H. Mobitt's company.

Harrison County Sheriff John J. Kennedy and County Judge Joseph U. Fields helped end the conflict siding with the law and order party. The Regulator leader Charles W. Moorman was eventually assassinated in 1850.

== See also ==
- Early–Hasley feud
- List of feuds in the United States
- Reese–Townsend feud
- Sutton–Taylor feud
