= TSP =

TSP or tsp may refer to:

== Medicine ==
- Tropical spastic paraparesis, weakness due to T-lymphotropic virus infection

== Science and technology ==
- Team software process, for producing software
- Telecommunications service provider
- .tsp, for telephony service provider, file extension for a Microsoft API
- Thiele/Small parameters, of a loudspeaker driver
- Thrombospondin, protein
- Time stamp protocol in cryptography
- Titanium sublimation pump, a type of vacuum pump
- Trailer stability program on Opel vehicles
- Transit signal priority, for buses
- Travelling salesman problem, optimization problem
- Trimethylsilyl-2,2,3,3-tetradeuteropropionic acid, derivative of tetramethylsilane
- Trisodium phosphate, cleaning agent
- TSP (econometrics software), programming language
- Tunnel Setup Protocol, in networking
- Time Synchronization Protocol, see timed
- Type Set Page, in E-publishing

== Food and cooking ==
- Teaspoonful, abbreviation
- Textured soy protein

== Governmental ==
- Taconic State Parkway, New York State, USA
- Telecommunications Service Priority in an emergency, USA
- Texas Student Publications, USA
- Texas Special Police
- Texas State Police
- Threatened Species Protection Act 1995, Tasmania, Australia
- Thrift Savings Plan, USA
- Trust service provider

== Internationally ==
- Tajikistan Support Project, supporting healthcare
- Texas Star Party for astronomers
- TSP, IATA airport code for Tehachapi Municipal Airport, California, USA
- TSP, MTR station code for Tuen Mun Swimming Pool stop, Hong Kong

== Political parties ==
- National Harmony Party (Tautas Saskaņas partija), former party in Latvia
- Taiwan Solidarity Party
- Taiwan Statebuilding Party
- Tautua Samoa Party, Samoa
- Third Society Party, Taiwan

== Other ==
- The Stanley Parable, a 2013 video game developed by Galactic Cafe
- Toronto St. Patricks, an early name for the Toronto Maple Leafs of the National Hockey League
