= Union, Texas =

Populated place in Wilson County, Texas

- Unincorporated community
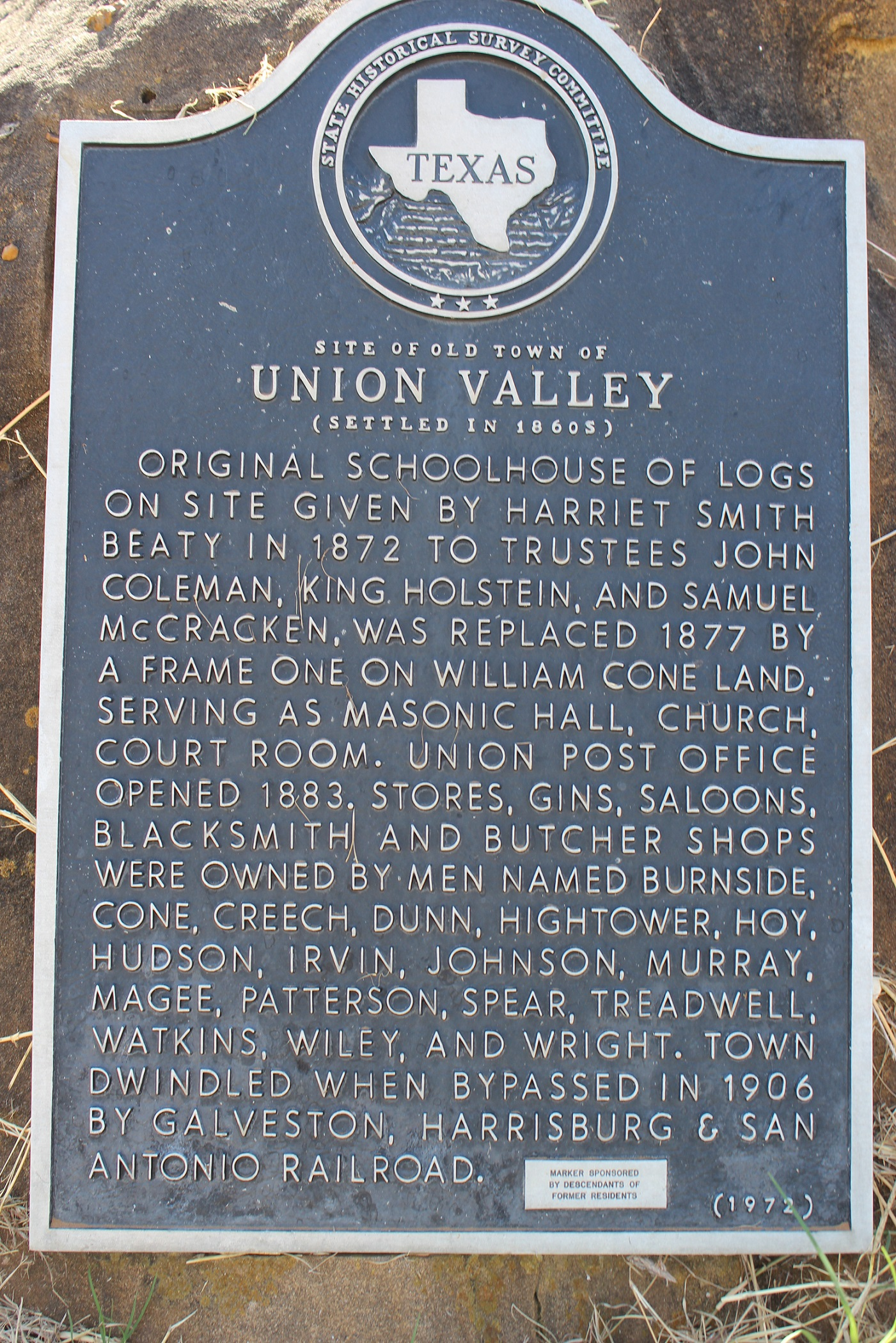
- Historic marker at the original site of the Union Valley school house, established 1872
- Interactive map of Union, Texas
- Coordinates: 29°19′14″N 97°50′42″W
- Country: United States
- State: Texas
- County: Wilson

Population
  - Total: 22 (2,000)

Union is a populated place in Wilson County, Texas, United States. The area is named for the local ghost town that was originally named "Union Valley." Today, the extant community of Union is located on FM Road 1681, about 56 miles southeast of San Antonio. The cemetery—still visible—used by the town's early inhabitants, contains the grave of Jane Bowen, the wife of outlaw John Wesley Hardin.

== History ==
The rural community was settled shortly before the start of the Civil War, and following that conflict grew up as Union Valley. In 1872 the settlement received the gift of a log school house and land from Harriet Smith Beaty, which was replaced with a framed structure in 1878. Union Valley was given a post office in 1883. By 1893, the town had a population of 300 and supported three general stores, a Methodist church, a mill, a saloon, the school, and a blacksmith. The two-room schoolhouse had an enrollment of 65 in 1903.

Union Valley was located very close to the nearby towns of Albuquerque and Nockenut. These towns ran along the Wilson County—Gonzales County line. At night, the lights from the three towns were visible to one another. Albuquerque and Nockenut are considered ghost towns as of 2020, and Union is a rural, spread out community with few families left.

The Union Valley cemetery is located five miles northwest of Nixon, off of FM 1681, between the Union Valley and the Albuquerque sites. The Mound Creek cemetery, north of Union near Nockenut, contains the grave site of John Wesley Hardin's first wife, Jane Bowen.

=== Name change ===
The post office name was changed in 1900 to the simpler "Union", and that is what the area is known as today. In 1906, when the Galveston, Harrisburg, & San Antonio Railroad by-passed the town, Union went into decline. The post office closed in 1915. In 2000, the community comprised 22 residents.

== Legacy ==
There are two historical markers referring to Union Valley at the site of the original town, located today on private property off Texas farm-to-market highway FM 1681.
