= Boyce–Sneed feud =

Conflict in early 20th-century Texas between two wealthy cattlemen

- Date: 1911–1912
- Location: Texas, United States
- Deaths: 7

The Boyce–Sneed feud was a conflict in early twentieth-century Texas between two wealthy cattlemen: John Beal Sneed (December 30, 1877 – April 22, 1960) and Albert Boyce Jr. (d. September 14, 1912). It began in late 1911, when Lenora (Lena) Snyder Sneed left her husband, John, for a relationship with Boyce. Sneed sought revenge for the sake of his honor and his home, which resulted in the deaths of seven men within the year.

== Background ==
The Sneeds were a wealthy family of cattle ranchers who lived in the Fort Worth, Texas, area. By 1911, the Sneeds had been married for over ten years and had two daughters.

In October 1911, after his wife informed him that she had been involved in a relationship with Boyce and wanted a divorce, Sneed had her placed in an asylum. (A diagnosis of "moral insanity" was a common practice for adulterous women at the time.) However, in the month following her incarceration, Boyce "rescued" her, and the two fled to Winnipeg, Canada.

Sneed's response to his wife's "kidnapping" by Boyce triggered a "bizarre series of events that symbolized the tenacity of frontier justice in west Texas in the early twentieth century." Initially, Sneed informed the police and succeeded in having Boyce and Mrs. Sneed arrested. She was released into the custody of her father, Tom Snyder, who owned a ranch in New Mexico Territory, but she later returned to Fort Worth to be with her husband. Sneed hoped to see Boyce sent to prison on charges of kidnapping. However, after the charges were dropped, he decided to take the law into his own hands.

== The feud ==
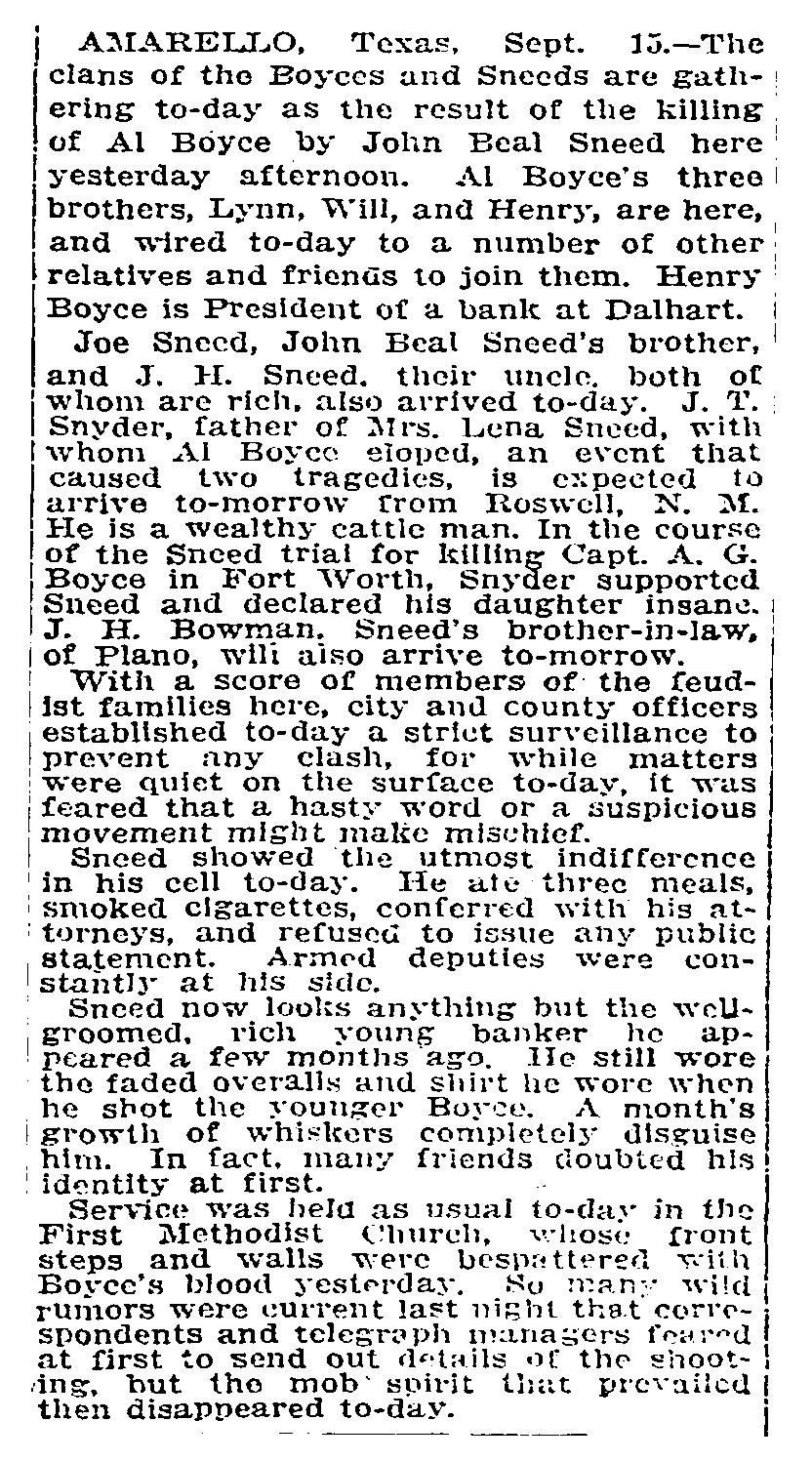
Boyce–Sneed feud, New York Times (1912)

The first death in the conflict occurred on January 13, 1912, when John B. Sneed killed Boyce's father, Albert Boyce Sr., who was a banker and a former manager of the XIT Ranch. Boyce Sr. was unarmed, and Sneed shot him in the back while they were standing inside the lobby of Fort Worth's Metropolitan Hotel. During the ensuing trial, Sneed alleged that Boyce Sr. had assisted his son in "breaking up [his] home." The trial was sensationalized by newspapers as "the greatest legal battle ever fought in Texas Courts."

Sneed's well-paid legal team managed to secure a mistrial. After the mistrial was announced, an angry mob attacked the courthouse, but was repulsed. An article written by Thomas H. Thompson for The New Handbook of Texas states: "Four men were killed outside the courthouse, and women fought with hatpins in the courthouse halls and even in the courtroom."

More violence

On March 6, 1912, Sneed's father, Joseph, was shot in the back and killed by a tenant farmer, R. O. Hillard, as he was walking down a street in Georgetown, Texas. According to Bartee Haile, a Texas historian, immediately after shooting the elder Sneed, Hillard committed suicide. In his pocket was found a letter that said; "My mind has failed me. J.T. Sneed is the cause of it. I am going to take revenge this way and then go to the asylum."

Sneed thought the Boyce family had something to do with his father's death. When Boyce Jr. returned to Amarillo, Texas, later that year, Sneed was waiting in disguise. On September 14, 1912, Sneed attacked Boyce in front of the Polk Street Methodist Church, shooting him three times with a shotgun. Boyce was killed before he could defend himself. Sneed then walked to the courthouse and surrendered to the Potter County sheriff. One of the witnesses who watched as Sneed surrendered was the young school teacher Georgia O'Keeffe.

On the day after Boyce's death, friends and relatives of both factions began assembling in Amarillo. It seemed as though more bloodshed would ensue, but the would-be combatants dispersed after Sneed posted bail.

Trials

Sneed was retried for killing Boyce Sr. before also being tried for killing the latter's son. He was acquitted both times, with the juries declaring the shootings justifiable homicides. Sneed became somewhat of a folk hero among Texans, but newspaper reporters from outside of the state regarded the shootings as cold-blooded murder. When reporters demanded a reason for the acquittal in the murder of Albert Boyce Jr., the jury foreman, James D. Crane, responded by saying; "The best answer is because this is Texas. We believe [that] in Texas a man has the right and the obligation to safeguard the honor of his home, even if he must kill the person responsible."

== Aftermath ==
After the trials, the Sneeds moved to Paducah, Texas, where they owned a ranch and a cotton farm. Mr. Sneed was also involved in land speculation. In October 1922, he was found guilty in a federal court of having bribed a juror who had been involved in one of his land deals. Sneed was sentenced to two years at Leavenworth, Kansas, by Judge James C. Wilson.

While in prison, Sneed's son-in-law, Wood Barton, was killed by a grocer, C. B. Berry, over a $28 debt. Although arrested, Berry was eventually acquitted. After Sneed was released from prison, he sought to avenge his daughter's loss of her husband. During two separate encounters in the streets of Paducah, separated by several months, Sneed and Berry shot each other numerous times. None of the wounds proved fatal. In early 1924, in yet another instance of frontier justice, both men were acquitted of having shot the other.

The Sneeds left Paducah and moved to Dallas, where they invested in an oilfield – they remained in Dallas for the next thirty years. Sneed died of cancer on April 22, 1960; His wife, Lena, died six years later, on March 6, 1966. They are interred side by side at Hillcrest Cemetery in Dallas.

== See also ==
- List of feuds in the United States
