= Early–Hasley feud =

The Early–Hasley Feud (1865–1869) was a family feud that took place immediately following the Civil War, in Bell County, Texas. The two main antagonists were John Early and Samual Hasley.

== Background ==
The Early and Hasley families seemingly had no problems prior to the outbreak of the Civil War. However, while most of the Hasley men were off at war fighting with the Confederate forces, John Early served in the Texas Home Guard, which had been formed to protect the home-front while younger men were away fighting. By most accounts, Early abused this power, often using his authority to take advantage of people. One of those he abused was an old man named Drew Hasley, the father of Samual.

== Escalation ==
When Hasley's son, Samual, returned home after the end of the war, he became enraged after hearing of the abuse his father had suffered. To make matters worse, Early had begun to ally himself with the Reconstruction forces, which were then occupying Texas. When the younger Hasley made it known he was looking for Early, the latter went into hiding. When it was necessary for him to venture out, Early would constantly stay in the company of the soldiers he'd befriended.

The feud was relatively low in violence, with opposing parties mostly stealing from one another. The Early and Hasley factions were, however, involved in several shootouts, resulting in two deaths. The first victim of the feud was outlaw and Hasley supporter, Jim McRae, who was killed in mid-1869. The other victim was an Early supporter, Dr. Calvin Clark, who was pursued into Arkansas and killed by Hasley later that same year. Following the killing of Dr. Clark, the feud fizzled out.

Hasley continued living in the area, and became involved in numerous outlaw acts in defiance of the occupying Reconstructionist forces. In the fall of 1889, while in Belton, town Deputy Marshal William "Cap" Light confronted Hasley over a disturbance Hasley was causing while drunk. Light ordered him to go home and sober up. Instead, Hasley mounted a horse, and rode it up on the sidewalk. Light attempted to arrest him, and Hasley pulled his pistol. Light shot Hasley, killing him.

== See also ==
- List of feuds in the United States
