= Pisgah, Texas =

Ghost town located in Texas, US

Pisgah
- Ghost town
- Location in Texas
- Coordinates: 31.88321590°N 96.49081660°W
- Country: United States
- State: Texas
- County: Navarro

Pisgah is a ghost town in Navarro County, Texas, United States.

== History ==
The area of Pisgah was first settled in the late 1840s. The Pisgah post office was established in 1891, but closed the following year. By 1900, the town included a school, a church, and several shops and industries. The school was merged into the Richland school following World War II. Except for the cemetery and a few houses, Pisgah had largely disappeared by the mid-1960s.

John Wesley Hardin taught school there for a short time in the 1860s while on the run from the law. He claimed while there he shot a man's eye out just to win a bottle of whiskey in a bet. Hardin also wrote that his cousin, "Simp" Dixon, and he encountered a group of soldiers in the area, and each killed one before they fled the area.
