= Reese–Townsend feud =

The Reese–Townsend Feud, also called the Colorado County Feud, lasted from 1898 to 1907 and was a politically motivated feud taking place in the closing days of the Old West, in Columbus, Texas, and other parts of Colorado County. Legendary Texas Ranger Captain Bill McDonald was dispatched to Columbus to restore order.

== Background and violence ==
The feud was a culmination of several factors, but mostly resulted due to the local Sheriffs race that placed incumbent Sam Reese against former Deputy Larkin Hope. Former state senator Marcus Townsend, who had been the deciding factor for the past nine sheriffs due to his political connections, had pulled his support away from Sheriff Reese, throwing in behind Hope. This led to tensions between those in support of Reese, and the Townsend faction.

Townsend's support of Hope all but insured his victory. However, on August 3, 1898, Constable Larkin Hope was shot and killed by an unknown assailant in downtown Columbus. Jim Coleman, a close friend to Sheriff Reese's sons Walter and Herbert, was the initial suspect. Townsend immediately chose another candidate, Will Burford, who with Townsend's support won an easy victory, becoming the newly elected Sheriff of Colorado County.

However, the previous tensions were anything but over. On March 16, 1899, Marcus Townsend, Will Clements, and Marion Hope, brother of the dead Larkin Hope, engaged Sam Reese and his supporters in a gunfight in downtown Columbus, during which Reese's supporters fled, resulting in Reese being shot and killed. Bystander Charles Boehme was also killed, and a boy named Johnny Williams was wounded. Although evidence and witness statements indicated that Reese provoked the gunfight, his sons vowed they would seek revenge. On May 17, 1899, January 15, 1900, July 31, 1900, June 30, 1906, and May 17, 1907, five more separate gunfights took place in Columbus, resulting in Dick Reese, brother to Sam, Sheriff Burford's son Arthur, Will Clements brother Hiram and Jim Coleman being killed. Dick Gant, another bystander, was also killed during one of the gunfights, and numerous bystanders and participants were wounded.

== Feuds end, aftermath ==
The shooters during all those fights were Mark Townsend, Jim Townsend, Step Yates, Will Clements, Walter Reese, Joe Lessing, Frank Burford, and Marion Hope, which ironically were all related by either blood or marriage, despite their hatred of one another. The citizens appealed to the city council to re-establish the office of Town Marshal, abolished some years earlier. However, the council refused. Texas Rangers were dispatched, to include James Brooks, which effectively ended the violence in 1907.

Despite each being unrelated to the feud itself, two of the main participants did die in later gunbattles. Marion Hope died in a vehicle accident in 1911. That same year, Will Clements was shot from ambush in Matagorda County, Texas by a man with whom he had had an altercation a few days earlier. Jim Townsend was also killed in 1911, in a gun battle with a saloon keeper in Louise, Texas. Herbert Reese was killed in 1912, when a gun he was cleaning in his Columbus home accidentally discharged. Walter Reese died in an automobile accident in El Paso, Texas in 1919.

== See also ==
- List of feuds in the United States
