= John J. Kennedy (Republic of Texas politician) =

American politician

- Nickname: "Colonel"
- Born: c. 1813
- Died: 1880 (aged 66–67) Hallsville, Texas
- Buried: Hallsville, Texas
- Allegiance: United States of America; Republic of Texas; Confederate States of America
- Branch: United States Army (Republic of Texas) Texan Army; Confederate States Army
- Service years: 1832–1836 (USA); 1836–1846 (Republic of Texas); 1861–1865 (CSA)
- Rank: First Lieutenant (USA); Captain (CSA)
- Commands: Company K, "Clough Rangers" (Republic of Texas) 17th Texas Cavalry
- Conflicts: Black Hawk War; Second Seminole War; Regulator-Moderator War; American Civil War: Battle of Arkansas Post
- Other work: Sheriff of Harrison County, Texas

John Joseph Kennedy (c. 1813–1880) was a Scotch-Irish American lawyer and sheriff of Harrison County, Texas that helped end the Regulator-Moderator War in East Texas. He was an artillery officer in the United States Army and a cavalry captain for the Confederate States of America during the American Civil War. Kennedy was also a Freemason and member of Marshall Lodge #22.

== Biography ==
He served as a first lieutenant in the United States Army under General Abraham Eustis in the Black Hawk War and Second Seminole War. In 1836 he immigrated to the Republic of Texas, receiving a 1,240-acre land grant from Anson Jones. He and his brother-in-law, Joseph Upton Fields, ended the Regulator-Moderator War while he was sheriff of Harrison County, Texas. Kennedy was also a Harrison County commissioner.

Kennedy ran for the Texas Senate campaigning against the Compromise of 1850. He was initially declared the winner, but then was defeated. According to the 1860 United States census Kennedy owned 21 slaves, making him a planter.

During the American Civil War Kennedy served as Captain of Company K, 17th Texas Cavalry, also named Clough Rangers. He fought in the Battle of Arkansas Post where he evaded capture.

== Sources ==
- B. B. Paddock, History and Biographical Record of North and West Texas, 1906
