= Albuquerque, Texas =

Old West settlement in Texas, U.S.

Coordinates: 29°20′54″N 97°50′34″W

- Ghost town of Wilson County, Texas
- 1857–1912
- Status: Abandoned, non-extant
- Government
  - Type: Mayor
- Founders
  - 1857: S. McCracken; H. Hastings
- Historical era: Old West
  - Established: 1857
  - Killing of Texas Special Policeman Pvt. Green by J. W. Hardin: October 1871
  - Hardin's assassination of Sheriff Jack Helm: May 17, 1873
  - Disestablished: 1912
- Today part of: Gonzales County, Texas

Albuquerque was a settlement established in 1857 by Samuel McCracken and Henry Hastings in what they thought was Wilson County. Its population grew, and following the Civil War, the town boasted a mercantile store, saloon, blacksmith shop, cotton gin, and an elementary school. Its U.S. post office opened in 1870. Albuquerque, which was actually found to be in Gonzales County, is today a ghost town.

== History ==
Henry Hastings and Samuel McCracken, two brothers-in-law from Mississippi, were the town's first residents, settling the area "located on the Clear Fork of Sandies Creek" in 1857. The town was originally thought to be in Wilson County, but was found to actually be in Gonzales County by a 1914 resurvey of county lines. Official recognition of Albuquerque occurred in 1870 with the opening of the post office. The McCracken family established a boarding house and blacksmith shop, and the town also had a store and saloon. An elementary school operated during the 1870s and into the 1880s. The name of the town came about from the return to the area of several members of the New Mexico Campaign, which had been led by General Henry Hopkins Sibley, following the civil war.

=== John Wesley Hardin's killings ===
The area was the site of two killings by the outlaw John Wesley Hardin.

The first of Hardin's fatal actions in town was the killing of a black Texas Special Policeman, Private Parramore Green. The killing occurred in October 1871 when Green, and a Private John Lackey, confronted Hardin at the mercantile store in Albuquerque with the intent to arrest him. In the ensuing gunfight, Green was killed, and Lackey was left seriously wounded. Hardin made good his escape and soon left the area, joining a cattle drive going up the Chisholm Trail.

The second fatality in town at the hands of Hardin was the murder that occurred on May 17, 1873, when Hardin and Jim Taylor ambushed Sheriff Jack Helm (sometimes Helms) in the town square. Helm had recently moved to the area to perfect his 'cotton-worm destruction' machine, which he had invented and patented. He was living at the McCracken boarding house, and found himself unarmed when approached by Hardin, having left his guns in his room while working on his invention at the blacksmith shop.

Helm and Hardin had been adversaries in the ongoing Sutton–Taylor feud for several years at this point. While being distracted by Hardin, Jim Taylor crept up on Helm from behind and attempted to shoot him, but his revolver misfired. As the startled Helm turned, Taylor managed to get off a shot, striking Helm in the chest. Helm rushed Taylor, but Hardin shattered Helm's arm with a shotgun blast. Helm then fled into the blacksmith shop. While Hardin held the townspeople at gunpoint, Taylor chased down Helm and unloaded the remaining five bullets into his head. As Hardin and Taylor mounted their horses and prepared to ride away, witnesses reportedly heard them boast that they had accomplished what they had set out to do.

== Decline and abandonment ==
Albuquerque's decline was attributed to the lack of railroad access as well as the growth of nearby Union Valley, which was just two miles south of Albuquerque. The Albuquerque Post Office closed for good in 1883, just 13 years after opening. The town itself was completely abandoned by 1912, and is today a Texas ghost town.
