= Jack Helm =

U.S. lawman, cowboy, and gunfighter (1839–1873

- Born: John Jackson Helm c. 1839
- Died: May 17, 1873 (aged 33–34); Albuquerque, Texas
- Cause of death: GSW
- Occupation: Lawman

John Jackson Helm (sometimes Helms) (c.1839–May 17, 1873), was a lawman, cowboy, gunfighter, and inventor in the American Old West. He fought for the Confederacy during the Civil War, but worked as a lawman for the Union during Reconstruction. He was an active participant in the Sutton–Taylor feud in and about Dewitt County, Texas; and was killed in an ambush related to the feud and perpetrated by Jim Taylor and John Wesley Hardin.

== Early life and family ==
John Jackson Helm was born in Missouri in 1837, the son of George Washington Helm and Ruth Mayo [née Burnett] Helm. Jack married his first wife, Manerva McCown, about 1857. The couple had two children, George and Mattie. Helm married his second wife, Margaret Crawford, sometime before 1870.

== War and Reconstruction years ==
Helm fought briefly for the Confederacy during the Civil War, enlisting in 1861 as a private with Company G, Texas Cavalry, CSA. In the next year, it is reported that he joined a vigilante group that killed five civilians (Union sympathizers); and that he also killed a black man he came across just because he was whistling a 'Yankee' song. Helm deserted in April 1864, and soon went to work for rancher "Shanghai" Pierce rousting cattle. After the war ended, Helm functioned as the leader of the Goliad County Regulators, a group of vigilantes, who cruelly—but successfully—restored order to the area which was suffering rampant cattle rustling and general lawlessness.

== Lawman ==
=== Special law officer ===
In June 1869, Helm was appointed a 'special officer' by Colonel Joseph J. Reynolds to assist Capt. C. S. Bell in subduing the outlaw "Taylor Party" in neighboring DeWitt County, drawing him into the Sutton–Taylor feud. Helm now found himself aligned with the Union-backed Sutton faction. Helm was also sworn as a Goliad County deputy sheriff, based out of Middletown (now Weesatche) at this time. On August 23, 1869, Bell and Helm led an attack on the Taylor brother's ranch. In the ensuing gun battle, Hays Taylor was killed, and Doby Taylor was wounded.

Helm and Goliad County Sheriff Andrew J. Jacobs, were successful in the capture of a Creed Taylor ally, Jim Bell, wanted on warrants. Jacobs, however, was shortly thereafter killed by Taylor family allies, the Peaces brothers. Afterward, Helm became relentless in hunting down members of the Taylor faction. Helm had by now developed a reputation for bringing in wanted men more often dead than alive. He would often give lawbreakers 10 days to leave Texas or face the consequences (usually to be shot dead with no warning or formal trial). The Galveston Daily News once reported that Helm and his men had killed more than 20 men in two months, while at the same time he and his force had handed-over just ten men to civil authorities.

=== State Police force work ===
On July 1, 1870, Helm joined the Texas State Police. With Governor Edmund J. Davis's approval, Helm held the rank of captain, and was tasked with patrolling the Texas counties of Wilson, Nueces, DeWitt, Bee, and Goliad during the Reconstruction. On August 26, 1870, Captain Helm and his men attempted to arrest brothers Henry and William Kelly (relatives by marriage of Creed Taylor's brother, Pitkin), on a trivial charge. During the attempted arrests, the Kellys were killed (although Kelly family witnesses claimed they were outright murdered). Mainly due to his decidedly heavy-handed methods, and the public outrage following the deaths of the Kelly brothers, Helm was suspended the following October. Governor Davis dismissed him from the State Police Force in December 1870. He was, however, legally cleared of any wrongdoing.

=== Local law enforcement ===
After his dismissal from the Texas State Police Force, Helm continued to serve the area, as sheriff of DeWitt County; he had been elected by 305 votes and had beat out two competitors for the office of sheriff.

== Ambushed in town ==
On May 17, 1873, (Note: Some historians, such as Sonnichsen and Derbes, have his date of death as July 18, 1873) the outlaw, John Wesley Hardin, an ally of the Taylor family, played a part in the death of Helm in Albuquerque, Texas. Reportedly, Hardin, Helm, and Sam McCracken, an acquaintance of Helm (Note: McCracken was Albuquerque's first settler and ex-mayor) were talking in front of a blacksmith shop. Helm had recently moved to the area, and in order to perfect a cotton-worm destroyer machine which he had invented, he often spent time in town, staying at McCracken's boarding house while he worked on his invention at Bland's Blacksmith Shop. Helm found himself unarmed except for a bowie knife when confronted by Hardin, having developed the habit of leaving his guns in his room while working on his invention.

While being distracted by Hardin, Jim Taylor, a nephew of Creed Taylor, crept up on Helm from behind and attempted to shoot him, but his revolver misfired. As the startled Helm turned, Taylor managed to get off a shot, striking Helm in the chest. Helm rushed Taylor, but Hardin shattered Helm's arm with a shotgun blast. Helm then attempted to flee into the blacksmith shop. While Hardin held the townspeople at gunpoint, Taylor chased down Helm and unloaded the remaining five bullets into his head. As Hardin and Taylor mounted their horses and prepared to ride away, they boasted that they had accomplished what they had set out to do. (Note: In Hardin's autobiography, he claimed his meeting Helm that day was entirely accidental.)

== Burial ==
Helm was buried in a shallow grave (Note: Helm's grave was intentionally dug shallow in case his wife wished to have him re-interred elsewhere.) in the McCracken Family Cemetery in rural Gonzales County.
