= James Brooks (Texas Ranger) =

American politician and Texas Ranger (1855–1944)

James Brooks (November 20, 1855 – January 15, 1944) was a Texas Ranger, and was a member of the Texas Rangers Hall of Fame, and who developed a reputation as a gunman.

== Early life ==
James Abijah Brooks was born in Bourbon County, Kentucky, to a wealthy doctor and planter. His father was killed during the American Civil War, and his family's home was destroyed. Brooks then helped his widowed mother raise his seven siblings. Once he felt his family could make it without him, at the age of 21 he departed for the west. He settled in McKinney, Texas, and later bought a farm in Collin County, with his intent being to start a ranch and raise cattle. For a brief time in 1879 he worked as a cowboy along the Chisholm Trail, but found the Kansas winters too harsh, and returned to Texas. He settled, for a time, in San Antonio, Texas, and worked for a period in Shafter, Texas.

== Texas Ranger career, gunman reputation ==
Broke and without employment, Brooks joined the Texas Rangers in January 1883, assigned to "Company F", starting a career that would last twenty three years. Brooks rapidly gained a reputation as a Ranger who would quickly draw his gun, rather than negotiate. In 1886, while pursuing outlaws in Indian Territory, Brooks became involved in a gunfight that almost cost him his life, resulting in one man being killed.

Less than one month later Brooks engaged a cowboy in a gunfight while in Alex, Oklahoma, over the cowboy carrying a weapon in town. Brooks killed him, and was indicted for manslaughter. Brooks was convicted of Manslaughter in Fort Smith, Arkansas, however Brooks' case was lobbied by fellow Rangers, and he was given a Presidential Pardon by Grover Cleveland, and allowed to re-enlist as a Texas Ranger that same year.

== Connor fight and after ==
On March 31, 1887, Brooks accompanied several other Rangers into Sabine County, Texas, hunting for the Connor Gang, a band of family members wanted for murder. The Connors, once productive hog farmers, had turned outlaw in 1883. The Rangers had tracked the Connors into a thicket of underbrush, and began moving in to make the arrests.

As the Rangers approached, one of the Connors, believed to have been the father, Willis Connor, stood and pointed his shotgun. The Rangers immediately opened fire, and a fierce exchange of gunfire ensued. At least 100 rounds were fired by the two bands, at a distance of twenty feet. Bill Connor was killed in the first exchange, as was Texas Ranger Jim Moore, while Captain William Scott, Private John Rogers and Brooks were seriously wounded.

By later Ranger accounts, Brooks, though wounded, trudged forward under fire, rapidly firing his rifle. Brooks was hit again, in the hand, mangling three fingers. Unable to hold his gun, Brooks retreated to where Captain Scott lay, and bandaged his hand. Rangers Jim Carmichael and Billy Treadwell were the only Rangers left in the fight by this point. Carmichael opened fire on Fred Connor, badly wounding him. However, when Fred Connor rose to flee, Carmichael's gun jammed. This left only Ranger Treadwell to continue the fight. However, unaware of the Rangers' situation, Willis, Fred and John Connor fled. Fred Connor would later be killed by Rangers in a shootout on October 25, 1887, while Willis Connor and a grandson were shot and killed by Rangers on November 15, 1887. John Connor disappeared.

Brooks healed from his injuries, and later assisted in the battling of the Fence Cutting War, as well as the Galveston, Texas, "Fitzsimmons-Maher prizefight incident". He successfully put down the Reese-Townsend feud in Columbus, Texas, and by 1904 he was stationed in the oil boomtown of Batson, Texas, due to a rise in violence. By that time, Brooks had developed a reputation as a gunman.

Retiring to Falfurrias, Texas, Brooks was twice elected to the state legislature as a State Representative, and lobbied for a new county, winning, with Brooks County, Texas, being named in his honor. He served as its judge for the next 30 years. He died there of kidney failure. Brooks was known as one of the "Four Captains", regarded as the leaders of the Texas Rangers who brought the organization into the 20th century.

== See also ==
- List of people pardoned or granted clemency by the president of the United States
