= Sutton–Taylor feud =

Blood feud that cost at least 35 lives

- Part of Old West
- Location of DeWitt County in Texas
- Date: 1868 – 1876
- Location: DeWitt County, Texas
- Caused by: Post-civil war land and cattle disputes, revenge killings
- Result: More than 35 killed; Ended by Texas Ranger captain intervention

Parties
Sutton faction	Texas Rangers	Taylor faction

Lead figures
William Sutton †; Reuben Brown †; Jack Helm †	Capt. Jesse Lee Hall (neutral)	Pitkin Taylor †; Jim Taylor †

Casualties and losses
13	0	22

The Sutton–Taylor feud began as a county law enforcement issue between relatives of a Texas state law agent, Creed Taylor, and a local law enforcement officer, William Sutton, in DeWitt County, Texas. The feud cost at least 35 lives and eventually included the outlaw John Wesley Hardin as one of its participants. It began in March 1868, not reaching its conclusion until the Texas Rangers put a stop to the fighting in December 1876.

== Background ==
The Sutton–Taylor feud arose from a growing animosity between the Texas Taylor family—headed by Pitkin Taylor, the brother of Creed Taylor (a Texas Ranger)—and local lawman William E. Sutton, who moved to DeWitt along with his mother when she married a man named William McDonald. Sutton had been elected deputy sheriff in Clinton, Texas, before the feud began. The feud lasted almost a decade, and has been called the "longest and bloodiest in Texas history".

== Events ==
=== Lead-up ===
On April 23, 1866, William P. "Buck" Taylor shot a black reconstruction soldier, Sgt. John O'Brien, who had come to a dance. That same month, John Hays Taylor had killed a black soldier, Sgt. Josiah Ripley, in an Indianola saloon.

On November 14, 1867, Maj. John A. Thompson and Sgt. John A. McDougall of the US 4th Cavalry Regiment were killed in Mason County, Texas, by Hays Taylor, P.G. Taylor, and a man named Spencer.

Deputy Sutton shot and killed a Taylor kinsman, Charley Taylor—whom he was trying to arrest for horse theft—on March 25, 1868. Nine months later, on Christmas Eve, Deputy Sutton killed Buck Taylor and an associate, Richard Chisholm, in a Clinton saloon, following an argument regarding the legality of the sale of some horses. These killings ignited the feud.

=== The feud begins ===
On June 5, 1869, Capt. Jack Helm assisted Capt. C.S. Bell in trying to arrest members of the Taylor family. Helm, as a deputy sheriff, assisted in the capture of Jim Bell. Goliad County Sheriff Andrew Jackson Jacobs, however, was killed in the process by the Peaces brothers, who were Taylor allies. Later that summer, on August 23, 1869, the Sutton faction ambushed John Hays Taylor and P.G. Taylor, killing Hays, although not before he wounded five of the Suttons. P.G. Taylor was wounded but escaped, and also survived another ambush by the Suttons the following month.

The following year, in July 1870, Sutton was appointed to the Texas State Police Force, serving under Captain Helm. The police force was tasked with enforcing the Reconstruction policies of the federal government. This force was known to have operated with a bit of a free-hand: more often than not returning with "wanted" suspects dead.

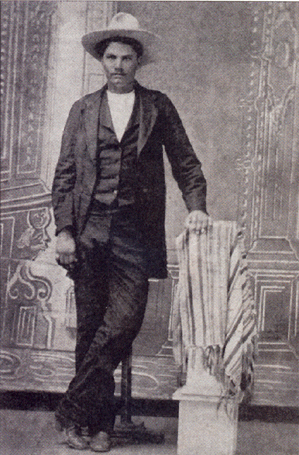
Gunfighter, John Wesley Hardin, joined the Sutton–Taylor feud at the behest of his cousin, Emanuel "Mannen" Clements

On August 26, 1870, the Suttons were allegedly sent to arrest brothers Henry and William Kelly on what some reported to be a trivial charge. The brothers were related by marriage to Creed Taylor's brother, Pitkin. During the attempted arrests, the Kellys were killed. Following his handling of the task, Helm was dismissed from the State Police Force, although he was legally cleared of any wrongdoing.

In summer of 1872, a group of Sutton supporters gunned down Pitkin Taylor outside his home. His son James Creed "Jim" Taylor took his place as head of the family and vowed to be revenged on Sutton. Jim Taylor twice tried to kill Sutton, but he escaped both times.

=== John Wesley Hardin joins the feud ===
In early 1872, on-the-run outlaw John Wesley Hardin joined his cousin, Mannen Clements, in neighboring Gonzales County, Texas. There, Clements and his brothers were active in the cattle herding (or, by most accounts, cattle rustling) business, working in close alliance with the Taylor family.

On May 15, 1873, Sutton family allies—Capt. James W. Cox and Jake Christman, were gunned down by the Taylor faction at Tumlinson Creek. There were reports that Hardin had led the fight in which the two men were killed, but he never confirmed or denied his involvement.

=== Deaths of lawmen ===
Hardin's main notoriety in the Sutton-Taylor feud occurred two months later, in a May 17, 1873, gunfight in Cuero, Texas. Hardin killed DeWitt County Deputy Sheriff J.B. Morgan. Hardin played a part in the death later that same day of Morgan's superior, DeWitt County's Sheriff Helm in Albuquerque, Texas. Reportedly, Hardin, Helm, and Sam McCracken Jr. were talking in front of a blacksmith shop. Helm, who was an amateur inventor, was working on a project in the blacksmith's shop. He was therefore unarmed (having left his revolvers in his room at a boarding house). During the heated discussion, Jim Taylor snuck up on Helm from behind and attempted to shoot him, but his revolver misfired. As a startled Helm turned, Taylor managed to get off a shot, striking Helm in the chest. Helm rushed Taylor with the intent to grapple with him, but Hardin shattered Helm's arm with a shotgun blast. Helm then attempted to flee into the blacksmith shop. While Hardin held the townspeople at gunpoint, Taylor chased Helm down and unloaded the remaining five bullets into him. Afterward, as Hardin and Taylor mounted their horses and prepared to ride away, witnesses claimed they boasted that they "...had accomplished what they had come to do." The next night, Hardin and other Taylor supporters surrounded the ranch house of a Sutton family supporter, Joe Tumlinson. Eventually, a shouted truce was arranged. Both sides signed a negotiated peace treaty soon after in nearby Clinton. The peace, however, lasted less than a year.

== The feuding resumes ==
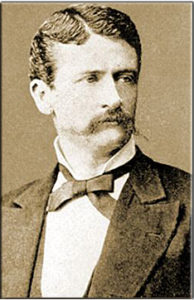
In late 1876, Texas Ranger, Capt. Jesse Lee Hall, lead his command to Cuero, Texas, and ended the feud

On December 30, 1873, a Taylor supporter, Wiley W. Pridgen, was shot and killed at Thomaston station.

The Sutton–Taylor feud reached its apex when Jim Taylor and his cousin William Riley "Billy" Taylor, along with several others, ambushed and gunned down William E. Sutton and a companion, Gabriel Slaughter, while they waited on a steamboat platform in Indianola, Texas, on March 11, 1874. William Sutton had grown tired of the feud and planned to leave the area for good. John Wesley Hardin admitted in his biography that he and his brother, Joseph, had also been involved—along with both the Taylors—in Sutton's and Slaughter's murders.

In retaliation, the Sutton faction caught and lynched three of the Taylor group on June 22, 1874, in Clinton, Texas. Those lynched were Rufus P. "Scrap" Taylor, John Alfred "Kute" Tuggle, and James White.

On June 1, 1874, two of Hardin's relatives, his cousin Alexander "Ham" Anderson and Anderson's brother-in-law, Alexander Henry Barekman, were gunned down by a Texas Ranger Company ostensibly in retaliation for their involvement with the killing of Sutton, but more likely because of Hardin's recent killing of ex-Texas Ranger and deputy sheriff Charles Webb, on May 26, 1874. Another member of the Taylor group was George Culver Tennille who was killed in Gonzales County, Texas, on July 8, 1874.

The fighting continued, although with much less frequency, after these killings. Jim Taylor, a Mr. Hendricks, and another man were killed by the Suttons near Clinton, Texas, on January 1, 1875. On November 18, 1875, the leader of the Suttons, ex-Cuero, Texas, Town Marshal Reuben Brown was shot and killed by five men in Cuero, along with a black man named Tom Freeman. Another black man had also been wounded. In his autobiography, Hardin made only two references to Brown: that "Rube" Brown had arrested Billy Taylor before sending him to Galveston, Texas, for trial, and that Brown had been among the leaders of a Sutton "posse" that had been out to "get" him in Gonzales County. It is not known if Hardin was directly or indirectly involved in the killing of Reuben Brown as he made no further mention of the incident in his life story. Billy Taylor was tried twice and acquitted. Reportedly, he was killed in Oklahoma in about 1895.

On September 16, 1876, Dr. Phillip H. Brassell and his son, George, were killed by the Suttons. Following the resultant outbreak of violence in October 1876, Texas Ranger Captain Jesse Lee Hall led a force into Cuero, Texas, to break up the feud for good. By January 1877, he and his supporting troop had put an end to the conflict once and for all.

== See also ==
- List of feuds in the United States

== Notes ==
29°5′38″N 97°17′27″W
