= Jesse Lee Hall =

Texas Ranger and soldier (1849–1911)

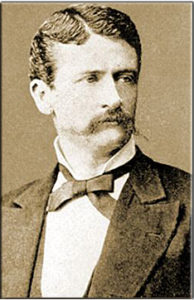
- Born: October 9, 1849; Lexington, North Carolina
- Died: March 17, 1911 (aged 61); San Antonio, Texas
- Occupations: Teacher; Soldier; Texas Ranger
- Years active: 1876–1900

Jesse Lee Hall (October 9, 1849 – March 17, 1911) was a Texas Ranger of the Old West, and is a member of the Texas Rangers Hall of Fame, and was later a soldier.

== Early years ==
Born Jesse Leigh Hall in Lexington, North Carolina, son to James King Hall and Frances Mebane Rankin Hall, he later changed the spelling of his middle name to Lee. Hall moved to Texas in 1869, starting off as a school teacher, but later signing on as a Town Marshal for Sherman, Texas, as well as a Deputy Sheriff for Denison, Texas. He also served as a Sergeant at Arms for the Texas Senate.

== Texas Rangers ==
In August 1876, Hall joined the Texas Rangers, serving under Ranger legend Leander H. McNelly, and was immediately posted to the Nueces Strip, where he solved a recent bank robbery in Goliad, Texas. The robbery suspects fled to Mexico, but eventually the band was broken by Hall. By October 1876, McNelly was extremely ill, and Hall was appointed to take command. He immediately led Rangers to Cuero, Texas to break up the Sutton–Taylor feud. By January 1877, he and his supporting Rangers had ended the feud. In February of that year he split his forces to battle cattle rustling along the Rio Grande area, and to battle a band being led by gunman King Fisher.

== Marriage and mid-life years ==
Hall served as Captain until 1880, when he turned over command to T. L. Oglesby. Hall married Bessie Weidman, who hated the Texas Rangers service, prompting him to resign, albeit against his own will. He managed several failed businesses, and in the mid-1880s he assisted in the fight against fence cutting during the Fence Cutting War, while at the time managing the Dull Ranch. He later served as an agent for the Kiowa-Comanche-Apache and Wichita Reservations at Anadarko, Indian Territory; he was indicted for embezzlement, but the charges were dismissed in 1888 for lack of evidence.

== Spanish-American War and later years ==
Until 1898, Hall engaged in several businesses, and in 1898 at the outbreak of the Spanish–American War he raised two companies for service, despite his wife's objections. After that military service, he served as a scout in the Philippine Islands. He left the military in October 1900, and from 1906 through 1907 he managed security for the Giroux Consolidated Mining Company. Having settled in San Antonio, Texas, he died there in 1911, and is buried in the National Cemetery.
