= Texas Special Police =

Defunct 19th-century Texas auxiliary law enforcement agency

The Texas Special Police were formed, along with the Texas State Police, during the Reconstruction Era administration of Texas. to combat crime statewide in Texas.

== History ==
Governor Edmund J. Davis, in order to combat crime statewide in Texas, formed the Texas Special Police on July 22, 1870 There were 30 Special Police Officers (SPO) assigned as auxiliary officers throughout the state.

On April 22, 1873, the law authorizing the state police was repealed by the newly elected Democrat controlled state legislature.

== Mission ==
The Texas Special Police was formed with the purpose of lending assistance to law enforcement agencies in the state of Texas.

== Engagements ==
On Friday, October 6, 1871, Special Policemen Green Paramore and John Lackey went to a general store in Nopal in Gonzales County to arrest the outlaw John Wesley Hardin. SPO Paramore went inside and SPO Lackey stayed at the back door. Paramore told Hardin he was under arrest and demanded his two pistols. Hardin handed the pistols to him butt first, and then did a border roll, whirling the pistols and shooting Paramore in the head, killing him instantly. Officer Lackey opened fire but Hardin shot him four times before fleeing. Lackey survived his wounds. Hardin was indicted, arrested but escaped jail and was never convicted for the murder of Officer Paramore or the shooting of Officer Lackey.

== Notable members ==
- Sheriff Jack Helm of Gonzales County; Texas Special Police officer, 1869–1870; later killed by John Wesley Hardin during the Sutton–Taylor feud.

== Line of Duty deaths ==
Green Paramore, was the only Texas Special Police officer killed in the line of duty. He was shot down by John Wesley Hardin Paramore was survived by his wife and three children.

== See also ==
- List of law enforcement agencies in Texas
- Special police

== Notes ==
- Texas State Police from the Handbook of Texas Online

== Bibliography ==
- Barry A. Crouch and Donaly E. Brice, "The Governor's Hounds The Texas State Police, 1870–1873", University of Texas Press; Original 2011 and Reprint edition (December 1, 2012), ISBN 978-0292747708
- Ann Patton Baenziger, "The Texas State Police during Reconstruction: A Reexamination," Southwestern Historical Quarterly 72 (April 1969).
- William T. Field, Jr., "The Texas State Police, 1870–1873," Texas Military History 5 (Fall 1965).
