= Greene–Jones War =

Clan feud in the United States

The Greene–Jones War was an Appalachian Mountain clan feud in the United States reputed to be second only to that of the Hatfield–McCoy feud in scale, duration, and number of people killed. At least sixteen people, including one child, were killed during the course of the feud, and many others were seriously injured. The feud took place primarily in the border areas of Hawkins County (formerly part of Sullivan County, Tennessee, one of the earliest Tennessee counties and said to have a large Melungeon population), Washington County, Claiborne County, Hancock County, Tennessee (created when Hawkins County, Tennessee was subdivided), and Lee County, Virginia, not far from Cumberland Gap, the narrow Appalachian Mountain pass sometimes called The Wilderness Road leading into Kentucky.

== The Greene ancestry ==
Most of the history of this feud is found in family records, particularly in a self-published small-edition book by Alton Lee Greene, a genealogist who lived in Sanger, Texas. Alton Lee Greene (a 20th-century descendant of the feuding families) traced the genealogy of the descendants of American colonist Judge William Greene, a judge in the Court of Common Pleas who was born in Lincolnshire, England in 1671 and died in 1722 in Hunterdon County, New Jersey. Judge Greene married Joanna "Hannah" Reeder, the daughter of John Reeder and Joanna Burroughs Reeder, who was born in 1699 in Newtown, Long Island, New York. Judge William Greene and Hannah settled in the area of Ewing, New Jersey and built the William Green House (Ewing Township, New Jersey), now on the National Historic Register and located on the campus of The College of New Jersey. Despite fund-raising efforts, the old farmhouse near where the troops of George Washington's crossing of the Delaware River once rested during the Revolutionary War, has never been fully restored.

Judge William Greene and Joanna Reeder Greene were the great-grandparents of Jeremiah Greene, who along with other Greene relatives migrated to an area near Rowan, North Carolina (a vast county of indefinite boundaries formed in 1753), where they formed a community called The Jersey Settlement by joining West Jersey residents who left New Jersey due to their unwillingness to adhere to the demands of Colonel Daniel Coxe, an English Colonial landowner and physician. Disgusted by Coxe's rampant political corruption, the Greene family settled near the Yadkin River in North Carolina and started the Jersey Settlement Meeting House, now on the National Historic Register. Jeremiah's family migrated to the Jersey Settlement and then to Hancock County, Tennessee, where his descendants figured prominently in the Greene–Jones War.

== How the war began ==
The Greene-Jones war entered the annals of folklore and national myth, and it is difficult to establish a true time line and documented narrative. This is partly the case because of the name changes of both the people and the locales. By the late 1880s the Greene family and the Jones family, mostly farmers with large plots of land, had lived in the narrow mountains of Hancock County many years and had become clannish families in which kissing cousins (usually second cousins) married or in which all the many children of one local family married all the children of a neighboring family. Most of the activity of the Greene-Jones feud occurred in an area in and around what is now Claiborne County, Tennessee, Cumberland Gap National Historical Park and the Pinnacle Overlook and Gap Cave in nearby Kentucky and Lee County, Virginia, and not far from the area of strife between the Hatfields and McCoys.

Strife between the Greene and Jones families is said by some chroniclers to have begun even before the American Civil War when one of the Greenes' pigs crawled under the fence and onto the Jones property. A Jones killed the pig and stuffed a hole in the fence with its body. Variations on the story of the pig/hog beginnings of vengeance are many. In retribution, Richard Greene, probably not the son of Jeremiah but one of the many other descendants named Richard Greene, broke up a big iron cauldron on the Jones property with an axe. The Greene–Jones War has many similarities to the Hatfield-McCoy feud, and the feuds' beginnings due to the killing of a pig illustrate not only how much the feuds had in common but also the value of pigs and other livestock to early mountain settlers.

Another cause of initial ill will between the families may have been the teasing but insulting ongoing jest carried out by the Jones boys against Susan "Sooki" Greene, the wife of Hampton "Hamp" Greene. Referring to her nickname, they would call out "Here Sookie, here sookee, here soookee," as though calling a cow.

Alfred Greene, born 1827 in Hawkins County, was a reconnaissance scout during the American Civil War and did not join either the Union Army or the Army of the Confederacy. He was killed in 1863 by a gang of three bushwackers when he secretly went home to visit his wife who was expecting a baby. The gang positioned themselves around his house and shot him dead as soon as he was seen outside the house. When his brothers Robert and David, who were Union soldiers, came home after the war, they killed two of the men who had killed Alfred. The third man went insane from fear for his life.

== On the Greene side ==
Robert D. Greene, a Union soldier and son of Richard and Jane (Trent) Greene, was born in 1841 in Hawkins County and died in 1905 in Sanger, Texas. He and his brother David were the murderers of two of the men who had killed their brother Alfred in 1863. Robert was County Clerk of Hancock County, a deputy sheriff of the county, and a wealthy farmer. According to Alton Greene, "When the Greene-Jones War started in full," Robert ordered "so many guns and ammunition, it had to be shipped by box car to Rogersville, Tennessee." Another in the chain of events was the death of Robert's oldest son Orlando "Landers" Greene, who was killed in the line of duty while Sheriff of Hancock County.

Marshall Greene, a son of Joel and Nancy Slaton Greene, was born in 1828 in Hawkins County and, according to Alton Greene, "may have been a Confederate soldier" and "probably spent a year in the pen for killing someone on the Jones side."

Hampton "Hamp" Greene, also a son of Joel and Nancy Slaton Greene, was born 1830 in Hawkins County and married Susan Trent, the daughter of Richard and Jane (Trent) Greene. He killed James "Jim" Greene, the nephew of Larkin Greene. Hamp Greene played a large part in the Greene–Jones War. The Jones party surrounded his house one morning and riddled it with bullet holes. The Jones party allowed the women and children to come out of the house, but Mary Greene's son, who had stayed inside with the men, was killed. Two of Hampton's sons, Dick and Dan, were in prison for killing some of the Jones men, and Hampton was trying to get them released. He met with his nephew, Jim Greene (son of Larkin Greene), at the store and Luther post office, but a quarrel ensued. "Jim tried to kill Hamp, but instead Hamp killed Jim." Hampton was never tried for the murder of his nephew. Hawkins County at that time had little official law enforcement, resorting largely to the vigilante law of the gun-toting Greene and Jones families.

Richard "Dick" Greene, son of James and Lucy (Lanham) Greene, was born 1846 in Hancock County. He played a large part in the Greene–Jones War. He was called "the meanest man" in the county but appeared not to bother anyone "unless they messed with him first." He killed Jim Jones, the son of Asa Jones, the leader of the Jones side, when Jim Jones cursed him. James Pratt and Lewis Gilbert fought Richard Greene, Link Greene, and Thomas Greene, who were brothers, and Thomas Greene was shot in one arm which had to be amputated.

Lincoln "Link" Greene (1860-1942), another son of James and Lucy Lanham Greene, figured prominently in the Greene–Jones War. "He once dressed as a woman when the Greenes were about out of ammunition, and in disguise rode by the Jones crowd, got the needed ammunition, and rode back." Later he "got religion" and a small group of his followers built a church for him. He dressed in the clothing of Biblical days. He made the coffins for himself and his wife and climbed into them to demonstrate that they were the right size for his "tall, thin body."

Greenberry Greene, son of John and Eliza (Calloway) Greene, was born 1847 in Hancock County, Tennessee. He was killed by a member of the "Jones Party" in Crab Orchard, Kentucky in the 1880s.

Daniel "Dan" Greene (born 1866 in Hancock County, and died 1897 in Hancock County) was the son of Hampton and Susan (Greene) Greene. According to Alton Greene's comments, he "took a big part in the Greene-Jones War."

== On the Jones side ==
The wife of Robert D. Greene and the wife of Asa Jones, the Jones side leader, were related.

Larkin Greene, yet another son of Joel and Nancy (Slaton) Greene, was born in 1826 in Hawkins County, Tennessee and died in Hancock County. The family of Larkin Greene was on the Jones side during the Greene–Jones War. Hampton Greene had killed Larkin's nephew, James "Jim" Greene during hostilities at the store in Luther, Tennessee.

Lee C. Greene, son of Larkin and Mahalia (Trent) Greene, was born in 1855 in Hancock county. He was on the Jones side during the war, and he either died of natural causes, was injured, or was killed during the confrontations between the two families. His widow married Alexander Brewer and later Solomon Byrd.

== Others who died or were injured in the Greene-Jones War ==
Houston Greene (born 1841), a son of Joel and Nancy (Slaton) Greene) died during the conflict, but was not historically identified with either side.

Jackson Greene (born 1846), a son of Joel and Nancy (Slaton), was a Union soldier during the Civil War. He was a drummer boy for Brownlow at one time. "Years later, William Gannaway Brownlow, 17th Governor of Tennessee, wrote and wanted to know what happened to little Jackson Greene."

Joel Greene (born 1852 in Hancock County), a son of Larkin and Mahalia (Trent) Greene, "played sides" during the Greene–Jones War. He was with Harvey Terrell at War Creek and was shot during the war by a Greene party. His arm had to be amputated."

Anderson Greene was the child killed in the home of his grandfather Hampton Greene, during the Greene-Jones War."

== The "end" of the war ==
Joseph Greene was the son of James and Lucy Lanham Greene. He was born in 1844 on a farm near the Luther post office and died in 1910 in Hancock County. He joined the Union Army and served in the Cavalry for nearly four years. He was wounded once, captured once at the Battle of Lookout Mountain, escaped and joined the army of General Sherman on his march-to-the-sea campaign. When the Greene–Jones War broke out and he was asked to take part, "he told his brothers that he had killed all the men he ever wanted to kill during the Civil War, and so he took no part in the Greene-Jones War." To end the Greene–Jones War, the Governor of Tennessee declared martial law and sent in the Tennessee State Militia.

In 1888, The Tennessean, a Nashville newspaper, reported in its front page domestic news summary that, "The Jones and Greene feud in Hancock County progresses. The same year, the Daily Democrat of Huntingdon, Indiana reported that the battle still raged and that both sides were heavily armed.

In April of 1890, The Comet of Johnson City, Tennessee reported the murder of Thos. J. Berry, a Justice of the Peace "in the 19th district of this country" when he went to his spring just after dark to assess the damage from a storm. F. M. Burton was with Berry at the time and recognized the shooter but refused to identify him. The coroner's jury held an inquest and decided "that Thomas J. Berry came to his death from a pistol fired by the hands of Asa Jones." Asa Jones was the leader of the Jones faction in the Greene–Jones War.

In May 1890 the Rogersville Herald of Rogersville, Tennessee reported the surrender of Ace Jones. Later, with a byline from the Rogersville Herald, The Comet of Johnson City reported what was thought to be "the finale of the late Greene-Jones War in Hancock County." The title of the article is "Nolle Prosequi Entered". This and other valuable historic newspaper resources are available in Chronicling America: Historic American Newspapers, a project of the Library of Congress.

Patsy Hatfield Lawson, a nationally recognized storyteller and descendant of both the Hatfield and Greene feuding families once said, "the one thing that distinguished these feuds from each other was that the New York Times did not report on [the Greene-Jones War] as it had in the Hatfield-McCoy feud, therefore, the Greene-Jones feud went relatively unnoticed by the rest of the world." However, the NYT reported in 1893 that Hiram Church of Hancock County, a bail bondsman for W. M. Hobbs who had been under a $10,000 bond, went to Knoxville to buy good handcuffs before leaving for Texas where Hobbs had run away and just been captured after escaping from a ten-year prison sentence for the murder of Sheriff Greene.

On November 27, 1902, the Alexandria Gazette in Washington, D.C. reported that Richard Green, "the feudist who gained notoriety . . . twelve years ago . . . committed a terrible tragedy." Said to be in a "maudlin condition," and "after a brief altercation," shot both his wife and daughter and then himself through the heart, emptying all the chambers of his pistol.
