= Texas State Police =

Defunct 19th-century Texan law enforcement agency

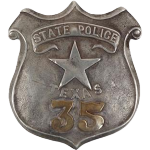
Badge of a TSP policeman, with badge number 35.

The Texas State Police (TSP) is a defunct 19th century law enforcement agency that was created following the Civil War by order of Texas Governor Edmund J. Davis. The TSP worked primarily against racially based crimes in Texas, and included black policemen. It was replaced by a renewed Texas Rangers force in 1873.

== History ==
The Texas State Police was formed during the administration of Governor Davis on July 22, 1870, to combat crime during the Reconstruction Era of the United States. Davis also created the Texas Special Police, State Guard of Texas, and the Texas Reserve Militia, which was the forerunner of the Texas National Guard.

Among Texas State Police members were Captain Jack Helm of DeWitt County, Texas—later murdered by John Wesley Hardin and Jim Taylor during the Sutton–Taylor feud. Another notable member was Leander H. McNelly of the Texas Ranger's "Special Force" division.

== Mixed results ==
Despite the success of the Texas State Police, the fact that the organization was controlled by Governor Davis and employed African Americans made it very unpopular, especially with former slave owners.

=== Flawed ===
In September 1870, local citizens of Hill County, Texas refused to cooperate with the TSP in moving against the Kinch West gang; and in December 1870 Hill County citizens blocked the TSP from arresting the killers of a freedmen couple.

Some state police members certainly deserved criticism. Captain Helm, for instance, was accused of murdering prisoners; he was fired, and a warrant was issued for his arrest. Others committed crimes for which the charges were dropped as soon as headquarters was advised. James Davidson, the chief of the state police, embezzled $37,435 and disappeared in 1872.

== Disbanded ==
On April 22, 1873, the law authorizing the state police was repealed. Former policeman Leander H. McNelly and at least 36 other state police members then became officers in the reincarnated Texas Rangers force.

== Fallen officers ==
Ten members of the TSP are known to have been killed in the line of duty:{ODMP record}. In five separate incidents six members of the TSP were killed and two wounded. Likewise, two former TSP members were killed as law officers:

- On January 22, 1871, when being transported through Freestone County on way to trial for the murder of Waco City Marshal and former TSP Policeman Laben J. Hoffman on January 6, 1871, prisoner John Wesley Hardin escaped and killed Texas State Police Private Smalley while Lt. Stakes and Anderson were gathering wood.
- On October 6, 1871, John Wesley Hardin killed Texas Special Policeman Green Paramore and injured TSP John Lackey.
- On July 26, 1872, Hardin wounded Texas State Policeman Sonny Speights in the arm with a derringer pistol, in Hemphill, Texas.
- On July 18, 1873, Hardin was involved in the Taylor-Sutton feud and killed former Texas State Police Captain and sheriff of Dewitt County, Jack M. Helms.
- Four other TSP members died as a result of a shootout on March 14, 1873. The Texas State Police officers were Wesley Cherry, Jim Daniels, Andrew Melville, and State Police Captain Thomas Williams.

== Legacy ==
The Texas State Police was disbanded on April 22, 1873. In 1935, the Texas Department of Public Safety was formed to serve as one of the several state police forces (the TDPS predecessor was the Texas Ranger Division formed by the Texas Legislature as McNelly's "Special Force of Rangers" and the "Frontier Battalion" in July 1874).

Other state agencies, including the Texas Attorney General's Office, Texas Parks and Wildlife Department, and the Texas Alcoholic Beverage Commission identify as state police yet provide state police services within their areas of responsibility, and informally use the term "State Police" on their uniforms and insignia.

== See also ==
- Texas Special Police
- List of law enforcement agencies in Texas

== Bibliography ==
- Ann Patton Baenziger, "The Texas State Police during Reconstruction: A Reexamination," Southwestern Historical Quarterly 72 (April 1969).
- William T. Field, Jr., "The Texas State Police, 1870–1873," Texas Military History 5 (Fall 1965).
- Barry A. Crouch, Donaly E. Brice, "Governor's Hounds : The Texas State Police, 1870-1873"
