= John Wesley Hardin =

American outlaw (1853–1895)

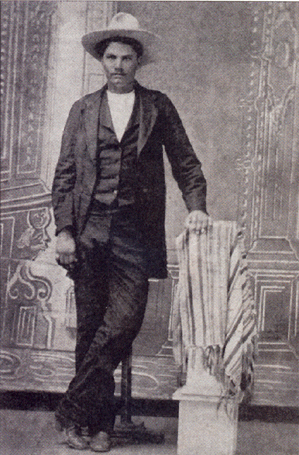
- This ferrotype photograph is a mirror image of Hardin.
- Born: May 26, 1853; Whitewright, Texas, U.S.
- Died: August 19, 1895 (aged 42); El Paso, Texas, U.S.
- Cause of death: Gunshot wound
- Other names: "Little Arkansas"; "Wesley Clements"; "J. H. Swain"
- Occupations: Gambling/card sharp, cowboy, cattle rustler, lawyer
- Known for: Very young outlaw and prolific gunfighter
- Spouses: Jane Bowen; Carolyn Jane "Callie" Lewis
- Parent(s): James Gibson "Gip" Hardin; Mary Elizabeth Dixson

John Wesley Hardin (May 26, 1853 – August 19, 1895) was an American Old West outlaw, gunfighter, lawyer and controversial folk icon. Hardin often got into trouble with the law from an early age. He killed his first man at the age of 15, claiming he did so in self-defense.

Pursued by lawmen for most of his life, in 1877, at the age of 23, he was sentenced to 24 years in prison for murder. At the time of sentencing, Hardin claimed to have killed 42 men, while contemporary newspaper accounts attributed 27 deaths to him. The actual number, while unknown, is believed to be in excess of 20. While in prison, Hardin studied law and wrote an autobiography. He was well known for exaggerating or fabricating stories about his life and claimed credit for many killings that cannot be corroborated.

Within a year of his 1894 release from prison, Hardin was killed by John Selman in an El Paso saloon.

== Early life ==
Hardin was born in 1853 near Bonham, Texas, to James Gibson "Gip" Hardin, a Methodist preacher and circuit rider, and Mary Elizabeth Dixson. He was named after John Wesley, the founder of the Methodist denomination of the Christian church.

In his autobiography, Hardin described his mother as "blond, highly cultured ... [while] charity predominated in her disposition." Hardin's father traveled over much of central Texas on his preaching circuit until he settled his family in Sumpter, Trinity County, Texas, in 1859. There, Hardin's father established and taught at the school that John Hardin and his siblings attended. Hardin was the second surviving son of ten children. The Hardins were Southerners and politically prominent. His great-grandfather was North Carolina provincial Congressman Colonel Joseph Hardin, the cousin of Senator Martin D. Hardin of Kentucky and father of Congressman John J. Hardin; relatives included Congressman Benjamin Hardin, Revolutionary war Colonel John Hardin of Virginia, and opposing Civil war Generals Martin Davis Hardin and Benjamin Hardin Helm. At the outbreak of Civil War, Hardin's father was elected a Confederate Captain; In 1862, at age nine, Hardin tried to run away from home and join the Confederate army.

=== Trouble at school ===
In 1867, while attending his father's school, Hardin was taunted by another student, Charles Sloter. Sloter accused Hardin of being the author of graffiti on the schoolhouse wall that insulted a girl in his class. Hardin denied writing the poetry, claiming in turn that Sloter was the author. Sloter charged at Hardin with a knife, but Hardin stabbed him with his own knife, almost killing him. Hardin was nearly expelled over the incident.

=== First killing ===
In November 1868, when he was 15, Hardin challenged his uncle Holshousen's former slave, Major "Maje" Holshousen, to a wrestling match, which Hardin won. According to Hardin, the following day, Maje "ambushed" him as he rode past shouting at him and waving a stick. Hardin drew his revolver and shot Maje five times. Hardin wrote in his autobiography that he rode to get help for the wounded man, but Maje died three days later. (Note: On December 9, 1868, Lt Charles Schmidt, the Freeman's Bureau agent-based in Sumpter, Texas reported Maje's death to the Assistant Adj. General of the Freeman's Bureau in a report the titled "Criminal offenses": "John Hardin (white) – Major Holshousen (fr[eeman]), Murder." Quote: "Hardin, a mere lad shot him without cause as the latter did not like the abuse of Hardin. He shot him five times every wound dangerous. No action was taken by civil authorities. Hardin left the county. He lived at Sumpter, Trinity Co, Texas." Additional: In the margin under the date December 9, 1868, is written the following postscript: "Murder was committed in Polk Co, Texas about ten 10 miles from Moscow") Hardin further wrote that his father did not believe he would receive a fair hearing in the Union-occupied state (where more than a third of the state police were former slaves), so he ordered him into hiding. Hardin claimed that, weeks later, the authorities eventually discovered his location, and three Union soldiers were sent to arrest him, at which time he "chose to confront his pursuers" despite having been warned of their approach by an older brother, Joseph. At a creek crossing, Hardin claimed to have killed two white men with a shotgun and killed a black man with a pistol:

... I waylaid them, as I had no mercy on men whom I knew only wanted to get my body to torture and kill. It was war to the knife for me, and I brought it on by opening the fight with a double-barreled shotgun and ended it with a cap and ball six-shooter. Thus it was by the fall of 1868 I had killed four men and was myself wounded in the arm.

Locals hid the victims in the creekbed about 100 yards from the ambush.

== Fugitive from justice ==
Hardin knew that he would be arrested if he returned home. As a fugitive, he initially traveled with outlaw Frank Polk in the Pisgah area of Navarro County, Texas. Polk had killed a man named Tom Brady, and a detachment of soldiers sent from Corsicana, Texas, were pursuing the duo. Hardin escaped, but the soldiers apprehended Polk and jailed him temporarily. Hardin also briefly taught school in Pisgah. While there, he claimed he shot a man's eye out to win a bottle of whiskey in a bet. Hardin also claimed that he and his cousin, "Simp" Dixon, encountered a group of soldiers and each killed a man. Allegedly, Hardin killed a black man in Leon County, Texas. On January 5, 1870, Hardin was playing cards with Benjamin Bradley in Towash, Hill County, Texas. Hardin was winning almost every hand, which angered Bradley, who threatened to cut out Hardin's liver if he won again. Bradley drew a knife and a six-shooter. Hardin said he was unarmed and excused himself but claimed that later that night, Bradley came looking for him. Bradley allegedly fired a shot at Hardin and missed; Hardin drew both his pistols and returned fire, one shot striking Bradley in the head and the other in his chest. Dozens of people saw this fight, and from them there is a good record of how Hardin had used his guns. His holsters were sewn into his vest so that the butts of his pistols pointed inward across his chest. He crossed his arms to draw. Hardin claimed this was the fastest way to draw, and he practiced every day. A man called "Judge Moore", who held Hardin's stakes of money and a pistol, refused to give them up without Bradley's consent and later "vanished". Hardin eventually admitted killing two men in Hill County.

After killing Bradley, Hardin claimed that, when a posse of fifteen men came after him, he captured two of them and took a shotgun, two six-shooters, a rifle, and two derringers from his captives. He then ordered the two men to join the other members of the posse at Jim Page's and wait for him to come along, stating, "I reckon they are waiting for me yet."

Later that month, on January 20 in Horn Hill, Limestone County, Texas, Hardin claimed that he killed a man in a gunfight after an argument at the circus. Less than a week after this incident, in nearby Kosse, Texas, Hardin was accompanying a prostitute home when they were accosted by her pimp, who demanded money. Hardin threw money on the ground and shot the would-be thief when he bent over to pick it up.

=== Arrest and escape ===
In January 1871, Hardin was arrested for the murder of Waco, Texas, city marshal Laban John Hoffman; however, he denied committing this crime. Following his arrest, he was held temporarily in a log jail in the town of Marshall, awaiting transfer to Waco for trial. While locked up, he bought a revolver from another prisoner. Two Texas state policemen, Captain Edward T. Stakes and an officer named Jim Smalley, were assigned to escort Hardin to Waco for trial. According to Hardin, they tied him on a horse with no saddle for the trip. While making camp along the way, Hardin escaped when Stakes went to procure fodder for the horses. He claims he was left alone with Smalley, who began to taunt and beat the then 17-year-old prisoner with the butt of a pistol. Hardin says he feigned crying and huddled against his pony's flank. Hidden by the animal, he pulled out a gun, fatally shot Smalley, and used his horse to escape. Hardin then claimed that, while on the run, he was "arrested" by three men named Smith, Jones, and Davis, but in Bell County, Texas, he killed all three with their own guns, after they became drunk and careless, and he escaped again.

A Texas Historical Marker notes that, in the 1870s, Hardin hid out in the vicinity of Pilgrim, Texas. After the Bell County shootings, Hardin found refuge with his cousins, the Clements, who were then living in Gonzales, in south Texas. They suggested he could make money by driving cattle to Kansas as a cowboy. Thinking he could get out of Texas long enough for his pursuers to lose interest, Hardin worked with his cousins, rustling cattle for Jake Johnson and Columbus Carol. (Note: State Seals were found on Joseph Hardin after his lynching.) Hardin writes that he was made trail boss for the herd. In February 1871, while the herd was being collected for the drive to Kansas, a freedman, Bob King, attempted to cut a beef cow out of the herd. When he refused to obey Hardin's demand to stop, Hardin hit him over the head with his pistol. That same month, Hardin may have wounded three Mexicans in an argument over a Three-card Monte card game, pistol-whipping one man over the head, shooting one man in the arm, and shooting the third man in the lung.

In the summer of 1871, while driving cattle on the Chisholm Trail to Abilene, Kansas, Hardin is reputed to have fought Mexican vaqueros and cattle rustlers. Towards the end of the drive, a Mexican herd crowded in behind Hardin's and there was some trouble keeping the two herds apart. Hardin exchanged words with the man in charge of the other herd; both men were on horseback. The Mexican fired his gun at Hardin, putting a hole through Hardin's hat. Hardin found that his own weapon, a worn-out cap-and-ball pistol with a loose cylinder, would not fire. He dismounted and managed to discharge the gun by steadying the cylinder with one hand and pulling the trigger with the other. He hit the Mexican in the thigh. A truce was declared, and both parties went their separate ways. However, Hardin borrowed a pistol from a friend and went looking for the Mexican, this time fatally shooting him through the head. A firefight between the rival camps ensued. Hardin claimed that six vaqueros died in the exchanges (five of them reportedly shot by him), (Note: In Hardin's autobiographical version of the gunfight, he claims the first fatality was the Mexican he had previously wounded, "Hosea", and that he was the boss vaquero. He wrote that he and Jim Clements prevented the rest of the vaqueros – aside from those who were already killed – from firing on them by deliberately stampeding the Mexican herd.) although this claim appears exaggerated—only three Mexican vaqueros were killed. Hardin also claimed to have killed two Indians in separate gunfights on the same cattle drive. The first instance was when an Indian tried to shoot an arrow at him on the South Canadian River. Hardin shot him and then had the body buried to avoid retribution from the man's tribe. The second incident, at Bluff Creek, Kansas, occurred when Indians wanted to collect a "tax" on the cattle. Hardin hit over the head an Indian whom he claimed had stolen a silver bridle from him. He then forced a war party to flee after he shot a second Indian who had killed a beef cow.

After arriving in Abilene, Hardin claimed that he and a companion named Pain got into an argument in a restaurant with an anti-Texan, which left Pain wounded in one arm and the stranger shot in the mouth by Hardin's bullet. Hardin fled Abilene to the Cottonwood Trail.

On July 4, 1871, a Texas trail boss named William Cohron was killed on the Cottonwood Trail (40 miles (64 km) south of Abilene) by an unnamed Mexican, who "fled south" and was subsequently killed by two cowboys in a Sumner County, Kansas, restaurant on July 20. Hardin not only admitted to being involved in the shooting of the Mexican outlaw but also claimed to have been deputized as a law officer and to have received a reward from Texas cattlemen for helping to shoot the John Doe killer. (Note: In Hardin's version of the killing, he names the murdered cattleman as "Billy Coran" and the Mexican as "Bideno".)

=== Encounters with "Wild Bill" Hickok ===
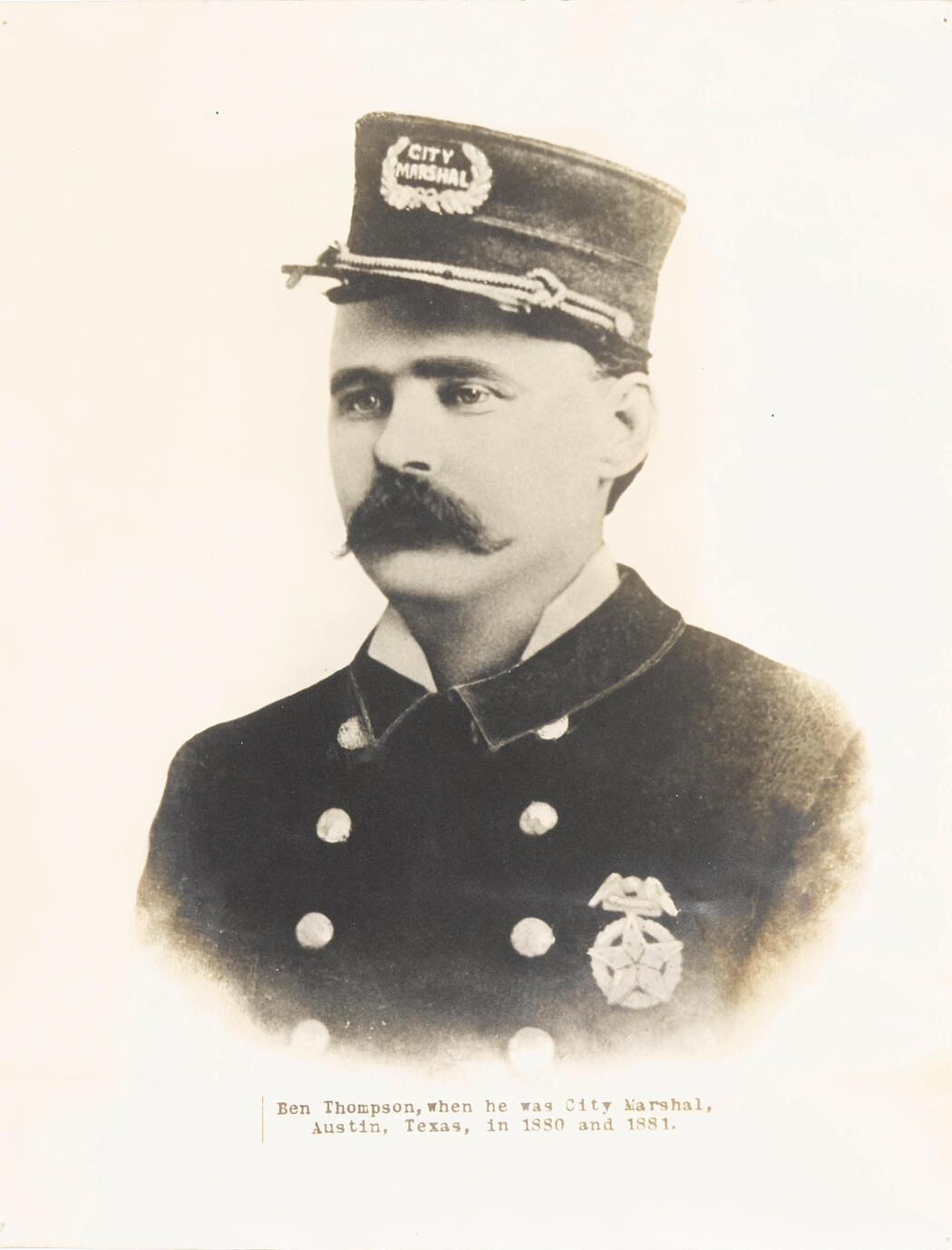
Ben Thompson, as Austin City Marshal 1881–1882

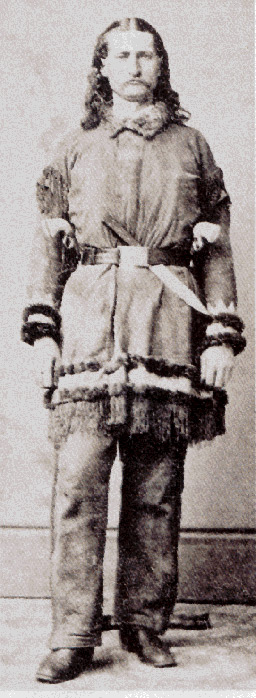
J.B. "Wild Bill" Hickok in 1869

The Bull's Head Tavern, in Abilene, Kansas, had been established as a partnership between ex-lawman Ben Thompson and gambler Phil Coe. The two entrepreneurs had painted a picture of a bull with a large erect penis on the side of their establishment as an advertisement. Citizens complained to town marshal "Wild Bill" Hickok. When Thompson and Coe refused his request to remove the bull, Hickok altered it himself. Infuriated, Thompson tried to incite his new acquaintance, Hardin, by exclaiming to him: "He's a damn Yankee. Picks on Rebels, especially Texans, to kill." Hardin, then under the assumed name "Wesley Clemmons" (but better known to the townspeople by the alias "Little Arkansaw"), seemed to have had respect for Hickok, and replied, "If Bill needs killing why don't you kill him yourself?" Later that night, Hardin was confronted by Hickok, who told him that he was wearing guns in violation of town ordinance and ordered him to hand over his guns, which he did but in a quite surprising way: Hardin reached down, picked his revolvers up from the holsters, and handed the guns to Wild Bill butts forward, then swiftly rolled them over in his hands and suddenly Wild Bill was staring right into their muzzles. However, both men did back down. Hickok had no knowledge that Hardin was a wanted man, and he advised Hardin to avoid problems while in Abilene.

Hardin met up with Hickok again while on a cattle drive in August 1871. This time, Hickok allowed Hardin to carry his pistols into town—something he had never allowed others to do. For his part, Hardin (still using his alias) was fascinated by Wild Bill and reveled in being seen on intimate terms with such a celebrated gunfighter. Hardin alleged that when his cousin, Mannen Clements, was jailed for the killing of two cowhands (Joe and Dolph Shadden) in July 1871, Hickok—at Hardin's request—arranged for his escape.

=== Kills snoring man ===
Soon afterwards, on August 6, 1871, Hardin, his cousin Gip Clements, and a rancher friend named Charles Couger put up for the night at the American House Hotel after an evening of gambling. Clements and Hardin shared one room, with Couger in the adjacent room. All three had been drinking heavily. Sometime during the evening, Hardin was awakened by loud snoring coming from Couger's room. He first shouted several times for the man to "rollover" and then, irritated by the lack of response, drunkenly fired several bullets through the shared wall, in an apparent effort to awaken him. Couger was hit in the heart by one of the bullets as he lay in bed and was killed instantly. Although Hardin may not have intended to kill Couger, he had violated an ordinance prohibiting firing a gun within the city limits. Half-dressed and still drunk, he and Clements exited through a second-story window onto the roof of the hotel. He saw Hickok arrive with four policemen. "Now, I believed," Hardin wrote, "that if Wild Bill found me in a defenseless condition he would take no explanation, but would kill me to add to his reputation."

A newspaper reported, "A man was killed in his bed at a hotel in Abilene, Monday night, by a desperado called 'Arkansas'. The murderer escaped. This was his sixth murder." ("Monday night", as reported by the newspaper, would have been August 7, 1871, not August 6.) Hardin leapt from the roof into the street and hid in a haystack for the rest of the night. He then stole a horse and rode to a cow camp 35 miles outside town. Hardin claimed he ambushed lawman Tom Carson and two other deputies there. According to Hardin, he did not kill them but forced them to remove all their clothing and walk back to Abilene. The next day, Hardin left for Texas, never to return to Abilene.

The incident earned Hardin a reputation as a man "so mean, he once shot a man for snoring". Years later, Hardin made a casual reference to the episode: "They tell lots of lies about me," he complained. "They say I killed six or seven men for snoring. Well, it ain't true. I only killed one man for snoring." Later, in his contradictory 1896 autobiography, Hardin completely omitted the "snoring man" from the story, and he related not only a wrong date (July 7 instead of August 6) but claimed the shooting was a case of self-defense, saying that the man he killed had first tried to stab him with a dirk. and was a burglar who tried to make off with his pants.

=== Gunfights 1871–1872 ===
Following his escape, Hardin claimed to have been involved in the following gunfights:

- On October 6, 1871, Hardin was involved in a gunfight with two Texas Special Policemen, two freedmen, privates Green Paramore and John Lackey, during which Paramore was killed and Lackey wounded.
- After October 1871, a black posse from Austin, Texas, came after him for killing Paramore but said that they returned "sadder and wiser" after he ambushed and killed three of them.
- In May 1872, about 45 miles outside Corpus Christi, Texas, after he was followed by two Mexicans, he shot one off his horse while the other "quit the fight."
- On June 19, 1872, Hardin was involved in a gunfight in Willis, Texas.
- On July 26, 1872, Hardin wounded Texas state policeman Sonny Speights in the arm with a derringer pistol, in Hemphill, Texas.

=== Sutton–Taylor feud ===
In early 1872, Hardin was in south–central Texas, in the area around Gonzales County. It was about this time that Hardin married Jane Bowen and started to keep regular company with her brother, cattle rustler Robert Bowen. While in the area, he also renewed his acquaintance with some of his cousins who were allied with a local family, the Taylors, who had been feuding with the rival Sutton faction for several years.

On August 7, 1872, Hardin was wounded by a shotgun blast in a gambling dispute at the Gates Saloon in Trinity, Texas. He was shot by Phil Sublett, who had lost money to him in a poker game. Two buckshot pellets penetrated Hardin's kidney and for a time it looked as if he would die.

While recuperating from his wounds, Hardin decided he wanted to settle down. After surrendering to Sheriff Reagan (brother of John Henninger Reagan) of Cherokee County, Texas, he was wounded in the right knee by an accidental gunshot from a nervous deputy. Hardin made a sick-bed surrender to authorities, handing over his guns to Sheriff Reagan and asking to be tried for his past crimes in order "to clear the slate". However, when Hardin learned of how many murders Reagan was going to charge him with, he changed his mind. A relative smuggled a hacksaw to Hardin, who escaped after cutting through the bars of a prison window. In November 1872, Hardin escaped from the Gonzales County, Texas, jail despite a guard of six men; a $100 reward was offered for his arrest.

On May 15, 1873, Jim Cox and Jake Christman were killed by the Taylor faction at Tumlinson Creek. Hardin, having by then recovered from the injuries sustained in Sublett's attack, admitted that there were reports that he had led the fights in which these men were killed but would neither confirm nor deny his involvement: "...as I have never pleaded to that case, I will at this time have little to say..."

Hardin's main notoriety in the Sutton–Taylor feud came from his part in the killing of two lawmen known to be Sutton family allies. On May, 17, 1873 in Cuero, Texas, Hardin killed DeWitt County Deputy Sheriff J.B. Morgan, who served under County Sheriff Jack Helm (a former captain in the Texas State Police and leader of the Sutton force at that time). Later that day, Hardin and Jack Taylor killed Helm in the town square of Albuquerque, Texas. On the run again in June 1873, Hardin assisted in the escape of his brother-in-law, Joshua Bowen, from the Gonzales County, Texas, jail imprisoned there on an 1872 murder charge. Allegedly, Hardin was also involved in this killing of Thomas Holderman.

On March 11, 1874, the Sutton–Taylor feud intensified when Jim and Bill Taylor gunned down Billy Sutton and Gabriel Slaughter as they waited on a steamboat platform in Indianola, Texas. Tired of the feuding, the two were planning to leave the area for good. Hardin admitted that he and his brother Joseph had been involved (along with both Taylors) in the killings.

After a brief visit to Florida—where he claimed to have been involved in three incidents against Negroes, including a lynching—Hardin met up with his wife, Jane, and their young daughter, with whom he had relocated under the assumed name "Swain". Hardin met with his "gang" on May 26, 1874, in a Comanche, Texas, saloon to celebrate his 21st birthday. Hardin spotted Brown County Deputy Sheriff Charles Webb entering the premises. He asked Webb if he had come to arrest him. When Webb replied he had not, Hardin invited him into the hotel for a drink. As Webb followed him inside, Hardin claimed Webb drew his gun. One of Hardin's men yelled out a warning, and in the ensuing gunfight, Webb was shot dead. It was reported at the time that Webb was shot as he was pulling out an arrest warrant for one of Hardin's group. Two of Hardin's accomplices in the shooting were cousin Bud Dixon and Jim Taylor. The pistol Hardin used was a .44 Smith and Wesson Model 3 Russian First Model # 25274.

The death of the popular Webb resulted in the quick formation of a lynch mob. Hardin's parents and wife were taken into protective custody, while his brother Joe and two cousins, brothers Bud and Tom Dixon, were arrested on outstanding warrants. A group of local men broke into the jail in July 1874 and hanged Joe and the two Dixon boys. (Note: It is reported that the hanging ropes were deliberately left too long (in order to cause death through slow strangulation), as grass was found between their toes.) After this, Hardin and Jim Taylor parted ways for good. Hardin would claim that he twice drove away men connected to the feud who had come after him, killing a man in each encounter. On November 18, 1875, the leader of the Suttons, ex-Cuero, Texas, town marshal Reuben Brown was shot and killed by five men in Cuero along with a negro named Tom Freeman, with another negro being wounded. In his autobiography, Hardin made only two references to Brown: that "Rube" Brown had arrested William Taylor before sending him to Galveston, Texas, for trial, and that Brown had been among the leaders of a Sutton "posse" that had been out to "get" him in Gonzales County, Texas. It is not known if Hardin was directly or indirectly involved in the killing of Reuben Brown, as he makes no further mention of the incident in his life story.

=== Captured and tried ===
John Barclay Armstrong

On January 20, 1875, the Texas Legislature authorized Governor Richard B. Hubbard to offer a $4,000 reward for Hardin's arrest. An undercover Texas Ranger named Jack Duncan intercepted a letter sent to Hardin's father-in-law by Hardin's brother-in-law, Joshua Robert "Brown" Bowen. The letter mentioned that Hardin was hiding out at a lumber yard on the Alabama-Florida border using the name "John (or James) W. Swain". In his autobiography, Hardin admitted that he had "adopted" this alias from Brenham, Texas, Town Marshal Henry Swain, who had married a cousin of Hardin's named Molly Parks.

In March 1876, Hardin wounded a man, in Florida, who had tried to mediate a quarrel between him and another man. In November 1876, in Mobile, Alabama, Hardin was arrested briefly for having marked cards. In mid-1877, two former slaves of his father's, "Jake" Menzel and Robert Borup tried to capture Hardin in Gainesville, Florida. Hardin killed one and blinded the other.

On August 24, 1877, (Note: Whiting, Ala., August 21. To-day as a train was leaving Pensacola, the sheriff, with a posse, boarded the cars to assist Texan officers to arrest the notorious John Wesley Hardin, who is said to have committed twenty-seven murders, and for whose body $1,000 reward has been offered by an act of the Legislature of Texas. His last murder in Texas was the killing of the sheriff of Comanche county. He has lived in Florida for several years under the name of John Swain. About twenty shots were fired in making the arrest, and Hardin's companion, named Mann, who had a pistol in his hand, was killed.) Rangers and local authorities confronted Hardin on a train in Pensacola, Florida. He attempted to draw a .44 Colt cap-and-ball pistol but it got caught up in his suspenders. The officers knocked Hardin unconscious. They arrested two of his companions, and Ranger John B. Armstrong killed a third, a man named Mann, who had a pistol in his hand. Hardin claimed that he was captured while smoking his pipe and that Duncan found Hardin's pistol under his shirt only after his arrest.

== Trial and imprisonment ==
Hardin was tried for Webb's killing, and on June 5, 1878, was sentenced to serve 25 years in Huntsville Prison. In 1879, Hardin and 50 other convicts were stopped within hours of successfully tunneling into the prison armory. Hardin made several attempts to escape. On February 14, 1892, during his prison term, he was convicted of another manslaughter charge for the earlier shooting of J.B. Morgan and given a two-year sentence to be served concurrently with his unexpired 25-year sentence.

Hardin eventually adapted to prison life. While there, he read theological books, becoming the superintendent of the prison Sunday School, and studied law. He was plagued by recurring poor health, especially when the wound he had received from Sublett became re-infected in 1883, causing him to be bedridden for almost two years. In 1892, Hardin was described as 5.9 feet (1.8 m) tall and 160 pounds (73 kg), with a fair complexion, hazel eyes, dark hair, and wound scars on his right knee, left thigh, right side, hip, elbow, shoulder, and back. On November 6, 1892, during Hardin's stay in prison, his first wife, Jane, died.

While in prison, he wrote an autobiography. He was well known for fabricating or wildly exaggerating stories about his life. He claimed credit for many murders that cannot be corroborated. Hardin wrote that he was first exposed to violence in 1861 when he saw a man named Turner Evans stabbed by John Ruff. Evans died of his injuries and Ruff was jailed. Hardin wrote, "... Readers you see what drink and passion will do. If you wish to be successful in life, be temperate and control your passions; if you don't, ruin and death is the result."

== After prison ==
On February 17, 1894, Hardin was released from prison, having served seventeen years of his twenty-five-year sentence. He was forty years old when he returned to Gonzales, Texas. Later that year, on March 16, Hardin was pardoned, and, on July 21, he passed the state's bar examination, obtaining his license to practice law. According to a newspaper article in 1900, shortly after being released from prison, Hardin committed negligent homicide when he made a $5 bet that he could "at the first shot" knock a Mexican man off the soapbox on which the man was "sunning" himself, winning the bet and leaving the man dead from the fall and not the gunshot.

On January 9, 1895, Hardin married a 15-year-old girl named Callie Lewis. The marriage ended quickly, although it was never legally dissolved. Afterward, Hardin moved to El Paso, Texas.

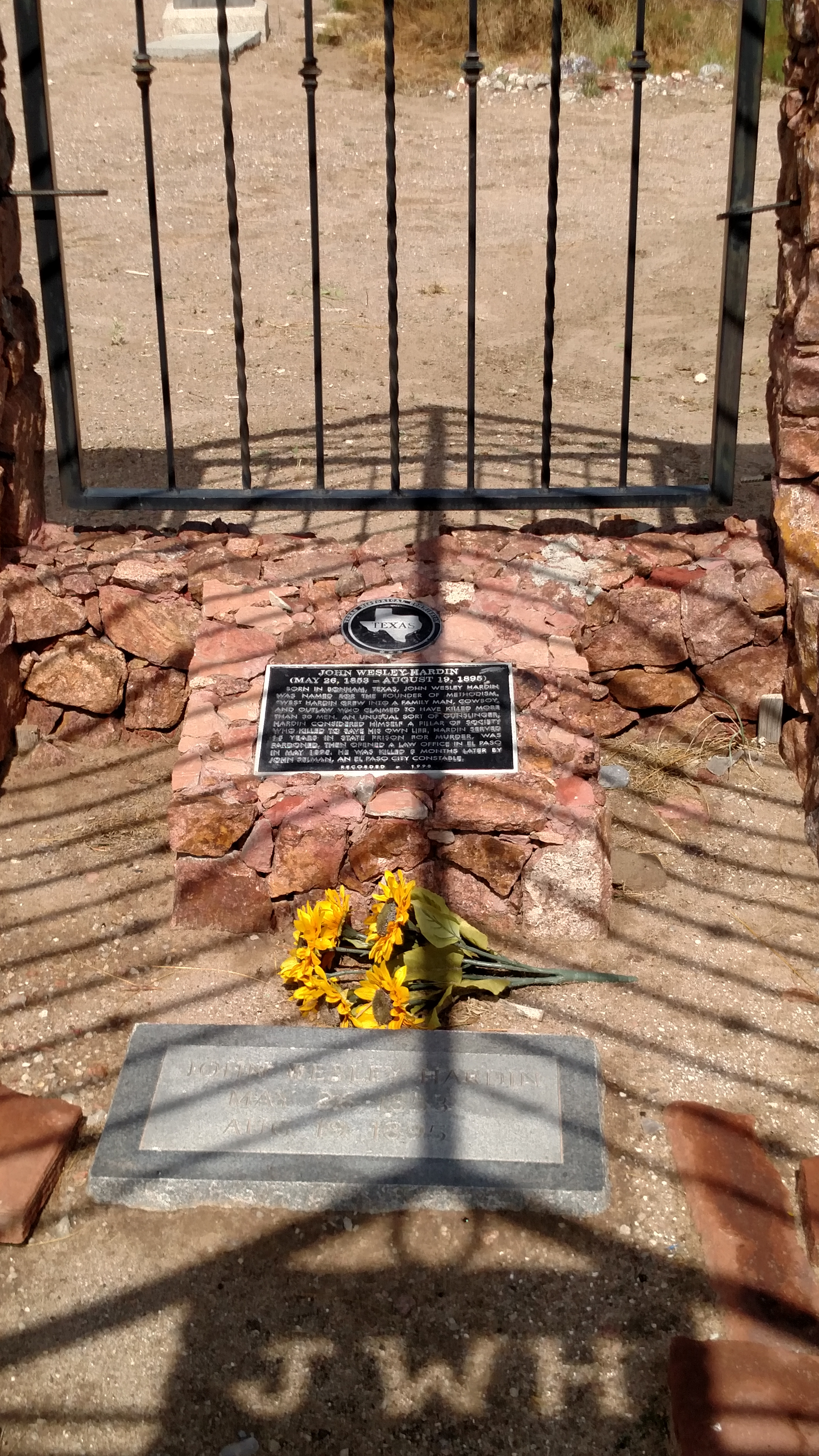

== Death ==
Hardin's post mortem photo

An El Paso lawman, John Selman Jr., arrested Hardin's acquaintance and part-time prostitute, the "widow" M'Rose (or Mroz), for "brandishing a gun in public". Hardin confronted Selman and the two men argued. Some accounts state that Hardin pistol-whipped the younger man. Selman's 56-year-old father, Constable John Selman Sr. (himself a notorious gunman and former outlaw), approached Hardin on the afternoon of August 19, 1895, and the two men exchanged heated words.

That night, Hardin went to the Acme Saloon where he began playing dice; his last words were "Four sixes to beat". Shortly before midnight, Selman Sr. entered the saloon, walked up to Hardin from behind, and shot him in the head, killing him instantly with a Colt .45 #141805. As Hardin lay on the floor, Selman fired three more shots into him. Hardin's hand was on the handle of his holstered pistol, a Smith and Wesson Frontier Model .44-40 #352. Hardin is also alleged to have had a second pistol, a 4 3/4-inch barreled, .45 caliber 1873 Colt Single Action Army. Hardin was buried the following day in Concordia Cemetery, in El Paso.

Selman Sr. was arrested for murder and stood trial. He claimed self-defense, stating that he witnessed Hardin attempting to draw his pistol upon seeing him enter the saloon, and a hung jury resulted in his being released on bond, pending a retrial. However, before the retrial could be organized Selman was killed in a shootout with US Marshal George Scarborough on April 6, 1896, during an argument following a card game.

== Reburial controversy ==
The grave of John Wesley Hardin

A century later, on August 27, 1995, there was a confrontation between two groups at the site of Hardin's grave. One group, representing several of Hardin's great-grandchildren, sought to relocate his body to Nixon, Texas, to be interred next to the grave of his first wife, Jane. The other group, consisting of locals from El Paso, sought to prevent the move. At the cemetery, the group representing Hardin's descendants presented a disinterment permit for the body, while the El Pasoans presented a court order prohibiting its removal. Both sides accused the other parties of seeking the tourist revenue generated by the location of the body. A subsequent lawsuit ruled in favor of keeping the body in El Paso, which was reversed on appeal, but his remains were never moved.

== Known contacts with the law ==
Hardin had numerous confirmed clashes with the law:

- January 9, 1871: Arrested by Constable E.T. Stakes and 12 citizens in Harrison County, Texas, on a charge of four murders and one horse theft. It is alleged that Hardin was an accomplice in the killing of ex-Texas State Policeman and Waco Texas Town Marshal Laban John Hoffman on January 6, 1871. Hardin claimed not to have been involved in Hoffman's murder.
- January 22, 1871: Hardin killed Texas State Police officer Jim Smalley and escaped. Up to November 13, 1872, the Grand Jury of Freestone County, Texas had not filed an indictment against Hardin for Smalley's killing.
- August 6, 1871: In Abilene, Dickinson County, Kansas, Charles Couger was killed in the American House Hotel. Hardin, aka "Wesley Clemens", was found guilty by a coroner's jury of the killing.
- October 6, 1871: Texas Special Policemen Green Paramore and John Lackey were killed and wounded, respectively, by Hardin in Gonzales, Texas.
- July 26, 1872: Texas State Policeman Sonny Speights was wounded in the shoulder by Hardin in Hemphill, Texas
- September 1872: Hardin surrendered to Sheriff Reagan, but escaped in October 1872.
- November 19, 1872: Hardin mysteriously escaped from the sheriff of Gonzales County, Texas, despite a guard of six men. A reward of $100 was offered for his re-capture.
- June 17, 1873: Hardin assisted in the escape of his brother-in-law, outlaw Joshua "Brown" Bowen, from the Gonzales County, Texas, jail. Bowen had been charged with the December 17, 1872, killing of Thomas Holderman. After Bowen's execution in the summer of 1878, Hardin was implicated in Holderman's death as well.
- July 18, 1873,: Hardin killed Dewitt County Texas ex-{?}Deputy Sheriff Morgan and later killed Dewitt County Sheriff Jack Helm.
- August 26, 1873: Cuero Texas Sheriff D.J. Blair prevented a gunfight between two well-armed parties, one of which was headed by John Hardin and the other headed by Capt. Joe Tomlinson.
- October 1873: Hardin was indicted in Hill County, Texas, for the 1870 death of Benjamin Bradley, but was never tried.
- May 26, 1874: Hardin killed Brown County Deputy Sheriff Charles Webb in Comanche, Texas.
- November 1876: Hardin (under the alias of "Swain") and Gus Kennedy were arrested in Mobile, Alabama, for having a deck of marked cards, and ordered to leave town. A police Sgt was wounded in the arm
- August 1877: Reported to have been under indictments in five Texas counties: Trinity County, Texas; Comanche County, Texas; Wilson County, Texas (the last was in July 1873 for the killing of Sheriff Jack Helm) on three separate murder charges; Navarro County, Texas; and Smith County, Texas, on two separate charges of assault with intent to murder.
- May 1, 1895: Hardin used a pistol to get back money that he lost in gambling at El Paso's Gem Saloon. Hardin would later publish a defense of his action.
- July 1895: Fined $25 for gaming, relating to the May 1 incident, where he lost and took back $100 at the Gem Saloon. His gun was confiscated.

== Confirmed shootings ==
- November 1868 Prior to December 9, 1868: Hardin shot and mortally wounded "Maje" (Major) Holshousen near Moscow, Polk County, Texas.
- January 5, 1870: Hardin killed Benjamin Bradley and claimed to have brought about the "disappearance" of a "Judge Moore." in Hill County, Texas.
- January 22, 1871: Hardin killed Texas State Policeman John Smalley.
- June 1, 1871: Hardin killed three Mexican cowboys in Park City, Kansas.
- July 20, 1871: Hardin was involved in the killing of Mexican outlaw in Sumner City, Kansas.
- August 6, 1871: Hardin killed Charles Couger in Abilene, Kansas.
- October 6, 1871: Hardin killed Texas Special Policeman Green Paramore and wounded policeman John Lackey.
- June 19, 1872: Hardin is wounded in a gunfight in Willis, Texas.
- July 26, 1872: Hardin wounded Texas State Policeman Sonny Speights in Hemphill, Texas.
- July 17, 1873: Hardin killed J.B. Morgan in Cuero, Texas.
- July 18, 1873: Hardin killed Dewitt Sheriff Jack Helm in Albuquerque, Texas.
- March 11, 1874: Hardin was involved in Jim Taylor and William Taylor's killing of William Sutton and Gabriel Slaughter
- May 26, 1874: Hardin killed Deputy Sheriff Charles Webb in Comanche, Texas.
- March 1876: Hardin shot and wounded W.C. Overbey in Gainesville, Florida.
- November 1876: Hardin and Joe Kennedy arrested for having marked cards in Mobile Alabama; Mobile policeman Sgt Ryan was shot in the arm.
- Mid 1877: "Jake" Menzel and Robert Borup tried to capture Hardin in Gainesville, Florida; Hardin killed one and blinded the other.
- 1894: After his release from prison, Hardin won a $5.00 bet when he used a pistol shot to knock a sleeping Mexican off a box (victim was killed by the fall).

== Unconfirmed claims ==
Hardin's autobiography is filled with statements which can either not be confirmed independently from his book, or differ wildly from the historical record:

- Hardin claimed that after killing Maje, he shot three Union soldiers of the U.S. 4th Cavalry Regiment at a creek crossing at Logallis Prairie (now Nogalus Prairie, Trinity County, Texas). None of the military records name Hardin as a suspect, nor do any facts agree with his claims. Circumstantial evidence is that a murder was committed here, but the names and number of victims are unknown. (Note: See Chuck Parsons "A Lawless Breed: John Wesley Hardin, Texas Reconstruction, and Violence in the Wild West ...".p.25)
- In Pisgah, Texas Hardin claimed he shot a man's eye out to win a bottle of whiskey in a bet.
- Hardin said he shot one of the two soldiers killed in 1869 in "Richland Bottom", the other having been shot by his cousin, Simpson "Simp" Dixson, a member of the Ku Klux Klan (and the Bob Lee outlaw gang) who hated Union soldiers. (Note: Hardin claimed that Dixon's mother, sisters, and brother had been tortured and killed by Union soldiers during the Civil War. In fact, Dixon's mother had been divorced in 1851. A brother was killed, but in 1868 during the Lee-Peacock feud.) Records indicate that a Sgt. J.F. Leonard of Company B, 6th U.S. Cavalry, was wounded at Livingston, Texas, on May 7, 1869. "Simp" Dixson/Dickson was killed by US soldiers In February 1870.
- Allegedly, Hardin killed a black man in Leon County, Texas.
- In January 1870, Hardin claimed he killed a circus hand at Horn Hill, Texas. A contemporary newspaper account did report a fight in Union Hill, Texas, between circus "canvasmen" and "roughs" who tried to get in without paying, although the outcome did not conclude the way Hardin claimed it did.
- A few days later, Hardin killed a man in Kosse, Texas; there are no contemporary newspapers to confirm this shooting. (Note: See Chuck Parsons "A Lawless Breed: John Wesley Hardin, Texas Reconstruction, and Violence in the Wild West ...".p.117. (This is not to say that there wasn't a shooting incident. According to a Kosse Texas Webmaster, there is a tradition that this killing took place in a hotel beside the towns railroad station)) Author Charles Adkins—in his 1970 book Texas, Guns & History—claimed the victim was named Alan Comstock; however he did not furnish any references to back up his claim.
- Hardin claimed that, following his January 1871 escape from Stakes and Smalley, he killed a Mr. Smith, a Mr. Jones, and a Mr. Davis in Bell County, Texas. No contemporary newspaper accounts from Bell County confirm these additional killings.
- In February 1871, Hardin claimed that a freedman, named Bob King, attempted to cut a beef cow out of the herd. When he refused to obey Hardin's demand to stop, Hardin hit him over the head with his pistol. That same month, Hardin claimed to have been involved in a shooting incident in which he wounded three Mexicans in an argument over a Three-card Monte card game, pistol-whipping one man over the head, shooting one man in the arm, and shooting the third man in the lung.
- Hardin made the claim to have outdrawn "Wild Bill" Hickok. No contemporary newspaper accounts confirm this, but another report suggests that it was Hickok who made Hardin put up his guns.
- Another claim was that he killed a man in Abilene, Kansas, in the summer of 1871. No contemporary newspaper accounts with evidence of such a killing exist, although a 1924 account does report a saloon shooting in some respects similar to Hardin's version. (Note: Although there are no contemporary newspaper reports of this shooting, this killing is mentioned in a 1924 account by Texas cattleman George N. Steen, who reported: While we were there one night, a man was drinking at a bar in a saloon, and somebody fired in from outside, the bullet striking him in the mouth and instantly killing him ... ; from The Trail Drivers of Texas, Part One; pub. 1924; Hunter, J. Marvin; p. 140.)
- As noted above, Hardin claimed to have captured Abilene law officer Tom Carson and other officers and humiliated them sans clothing. Although Carson was a law officer, he did not have any interactions with Hardin
- Hardin claimed that after killing Green Paramore in October 1871, he forced an African-American posse to flee after killing three of them. There are no contemporary accounts to confirm this claim.
- At an unknown date in May 1872, Hardin claimed that 45 miles outside Corpus Christie, Texas, he was followed by two Mexicans; that he killed one and the other fled.
- Hardin claimed that on June 19, 1872, in Willis, Texas, some men tried to arrest him for carrying a pistol, "... but they got the contents instead". Hardin was wounded in a gunfight around this time, but records indicate the fight occurred with just one other man.
- After being wounded by Sublett in August 1872, Hardin claimed that in September he either killed or drove off one or two members of the Texas State Police in Trinity, Texas. Hardin gave different versions of the event at different times. Although during his career he had killed two and wounded two of the Texas State policemen, these shootings did not occur in Trinity County.
- September 1873, in Brooksville, Hernando County, Florida, a former slave named Allen May was shot and killed. A Savannah newspaper claimed the killer was John Wesley Hardin on a cattle drive in central Florida but offered no proof Hardin was involved.
- In May 1874, while in Gainesville, Florida, Hardin confessed to having knocked down a black man and shooting another during a disturbance outside the Alachua County jail. A black prisoner named "Eli", was lynched when the jail was burned down by a mob. Hardin claimed to have been part of the mob. (Note: The Alachua county coroner (who was allegedly part of the mob according to Hardin) afterward rendered the verdict that "Eli" had died after setting fire to the jail himself.) No contemporary newspaper accounts support this, except one suggesting that the first Alachua County jail building suffered a "demise".
- Hardin claimed that on July 1, 1874, he drove off 17 Texas Rangers who had been trailing him, and killed one of them. This alleged shooting happened after a triple lynching of Hardin's cousin and two ranch hands during the Sutton–Taylor Feud. He also claimed to have driven off another group of men after killing one of them. There are no contemporary reports to confirm these stories. However, on June 1, 1874, a Texas Ranger's company did kill Hardin's cousins, Alexander Barekman and Alexander Anderson, in a gunfight and claimed to have wounded Hardin as well. Hardin wrote about his cousins' killings but does not confirm that he was wounded at all, and claimed to have heard about their deaths later.
- Later, Hardin and Mac Young were supposedly stopped near Bellville, Texas, by a posse under Sheriff Charles Langhammer of Austin on suspicion of being horse thieves. Hardin pulled his guns on Langhammer but did not shoot him, fleeing instead; Young was arrested and fined $100 for having a concealed pistol.
- Hardin claimed to have been involved in the killing of two Pinkerton agents on the Florida–Georgia border sometime between April and November 1876, after a gunfight with a "Pinkerton Gang" who had been tracking him from Jacksonville, Florida. This confrontation is pure fiction, as the Pinkerton Detective Agency never pursued Hardin. However, in March 1876 it was alleged Hardin, a.k.a. "Swain", who had wounded W.C. Overbey, who had tried to act as a mediator between Hardin and another person.
- Hardin claimed that in a saloon on election night in November 1876, he and a companion, Jacksonville policeman Gus Kennedy, were involved in a gunfight with Mobile policemen in which one person was wounded and two killed. He further claims that he and Kennedy were arrested and later released. This appears to be another case of an exaggerated encounter. Hardin and Kennedy were simply arrested and driven out of town for cheating at cards. Again Hardin's version does not fit with contemporary records which tell that nobody was killed and the only person injured was a Mobile policeman Sgt Ryan who was shot in the arm.
- Hardin claimed to have met two notorious fellow outlaws during his life: in 1870, he supposedly gambled with Bill Longley. It is possible they met after both were sentenced for their crimes, Hardin receiving 25 years and Longley execution. Longley, who boasted of having killed as many men as Hardin, was outraged at the different degrees of sentencing. After being sentenced in September 1878, Hardin supposedly met Johnny Ringo, a fellow convict, in an Austin, Texas jail; in fact, Ringo had been acquitted and freed in May 1878.

At least three other relatives of Hardin were also killers:

- James "Gip" Hardin—his brother—killed Deputy Sheriff John Turman March 28, 1898, for which he served a jail term
- Emanuel "Mannen" Clements Sr-cousin-is alleged to have killed 2 cowhands in 1871. Clements was killed in a saloon March 29, 1887; ironically his son Mannen Clements Jr was an El Paso Constable/Deputy Sheriff 1894-until 1908; although acquitted of a robbery charge he was no longer a law officer. Just like his father he was killed in a saloon December 29, 1908
- "Deacon" Jim Miller (outlaw)—a cousin by marriage—killed Officer Ben C. Collins August 1, 1906 and was later lynched April 16, 1909

One relation was a law officer killed in the line of duty:

- James Burch killed October 10, 1897

== Legacy ==
The memorable circumstances and the sheer number of Hardin's life events, real or exaggerated, made him a legend of the Old West and an icon of American folklore. His autobiography was published posthumously in 1925 by Bandera publisher, historian, and journalist J. Marvin Hunter, who founded both the Frontier Times magazine and the Frontier Times Museum.

=== Firearms and effects ===
Hardin's weapons of choice, and several of his personal effects, have been well documented and auctioned to private collectors. Court records show that Hardin carried a Colt "Lightning" revolver at the time of his death. (Note: The Colt's serial number was 84304: the gun was recorded in Colt factory ledgers as shipped on July 16, 1891, to Hartley & Graham, New York City. The Colt was accompanied by a tooled leather holster, marked with a barely visible stamp of an El Paso maker.) He also carried an Elgin watch when he was shot and killed. The revolver and the watch had been presented to Hardin in appreciation for his legal efforts on behalf of Jim Miller at Miller's trial for the killing of ex-sheriff George "Bud" Frazer. The Colt, with a .38-caliber 2 1/2" barrel, is nickel-plated, with blued hammer, trigger, and screws. It features mother-of-pearl grips, and the back-strap is hand-engraved "J.B.M. TO J.W.H.". This gun and its holster were once sold at auction for $168,000. Another Colt revolver (known as a .41-caliber "Thunderer"), which was owned by Hardin and used by him to rob the Gem Saloon, was sold at the same auction for $100,000. He is also alleged to have had a second .41-caliber "Thunderer") and a 4 3/4-inch barreled, .45 caliber 1873 Colt Single Action Army

In 2002, an auction house in San Francisco, California, auctioned three lots of John Wesley Hardin's personal effects. One lot—containing a deck of his playing cards, a deck of his business cards, and a contemporary newspaper account of his death—sold for $15,250. The bullet that killed Hardin sold for $80,000.

== Sources ==
- The Life of John Wesley Hardin As Written by Himself; Hardin, John Wesley; reprint Jun 1977; University of Oklahoma Press; ISBN 0-8061-1051-1. (Note: Internet Archive digitized 1896 edition is available)
- "Cases argued and Adjudged in the Court of Appeals of the State of Texas, Volume 4", during ...1878... by the Texas Court of Appeals –as reported by Jackson, Alexander M., Jr. & Jackson, A. M. Jackson; 1879; F.H. Thomas & Co.; St. Louis, MO.
- John Wesley Hardin Handbook of Texas, Texas State Historical Association.
- "The Hardin Collection" at Texas State University, online.
- The Feud that Wasn't; Smallwood, James; 31 Mar 2008; Texas A&M University Press; College Station, TX; ISBN 1-60344-017-8.
