= Area code 830 =

Area code in Texas, United States

Numbering plan areas and area codes of Texas with numbering plan area 830 highlighted.

Area code 830 is the telephone area code in the North American Numbering Plan (NANP) for the Texas Hill Country and most of San Antonio's suburbs. It completely surrounds area codes 210 and 726, which serve most of the city of San Antonio along with its innermost suburbs.

== History ==
The area code was created on July 7, 1997, in a split from numbering plan area 210. A few outer portions of the city moved to 830, making San Antonio one of the few cities split into multiple numbering plan area. This split occurred only five years after 210 split from 512. San Antonio's rapid growth and the proliferation of cell phones and pagers forced the entire suburban ring around San Antonio to change its numbers for the second time in a decade.

Geographically, the area code serves the north-western portions of South Texas.

Prior to October 2021, area code 830 had telephone numbers assigned for the central office code 988. In 2020, 988 was designated nationwide as a dialing code for the National Suicide Prevention Lifeline, which created a conflict for exchanges that permit seven-digit dialing. This area code was therefore scheduled to transition to ten-digit dialing by October 24, 2021.

== Service area ==
Counties served by this area code:

Atascosa, Bandera, Bastrop, Bexar, Blanco, Burnet, Caldwell, Comal, De Witt, Dimmit, Edwards, Frio, Gillespie, Guadalupe, Karnes, Kendall, Kerr, Kinney, La Salle, Live Oak, Llano, Maverick, Medina, Real, Uvalde, Val Verde, Wilson, and Zavala

Towns and cities served by this area code:

Artesia Wells, Asherton, Bandera, Barksdale, Batesville, Belmont, Bergheim, Big Wells, Bigfoot, Blanco, Boerne, Brackettville, Bulverde, Camp Wood, Campbellton, Canyon Lake, Carrizo Springs, Castroville, Catarina, Center Point, Charlotte, Christine, Cibolo, Comfort, Concan, Cost, Cotulla, Crystal City, D'Hanis, Del Rio, Devine, Dilley, Doss, Eagle Pass, Ecleto, El Indio, Falls City, Fischer, Floresville, Fowlerton, Fredericksburg, Geronimo, Gillett, Gonzales, Harper, Harwood, Hobson, Hondo, Horseshoe Bay, Hunt, Hye, Ingram, Johnson City, Jourdanton, Karnes City, Kendalia, Kenedy, Kerrville, Kingsbury, Knippa, LaCoste, La Pryor, La Vernia, Lackland AFB, Leakey, Leesville, Leming, Luling, Lytle, Marble Falls, Marion, McQueeney, Medina, Mico, Moore, Mountain Home, Natalia, New Braunfels, Nixon, Ottine, Pandora, Panna Maria, Pearsall, Peggy, Pipe Creek, Pleasanton, Poteet, Poth, Quemado, Rio Frio, Rio Medina, Rocksprings, Rosanky, Round Mountain, Runge, Sabinal, San Antonio, Schertz, Seguin, Smiley, Spofford, Spring Branch, Stockdale, Stonewall, Sutherland Springs, Tarpley, Utopia, Uvalde, Vanderpool, Waring, Westhoff, Whitsett, Willow City, Wrightsboro, and Yancey

== See also ==
- List of Texas area codes

Texas area codes: 210/726, 214/469/972/945, 254, 325, 361, 409, 432, 512/737, 713/281/832/346, 806, 817/682, 830, 903/430, 915, 936, 940, 956, 979
	North: 325	
West: 432, Country code 52 in Mexico	area code 830 surrounds 210/726	East: 512/737, 361
	South: 361, 956	
