= Texas State Highway 80 =

State highway in Texas

State Highway 80
- SH 80 highlighted in red

Route information
- Maintained by TxDOT
- Length: 88.30 mi (142.11 km)
- Existed: 1923–present

Major junctions
- South end: SH 123 at Karnes City
- US 87 at Nixon; US 90 Alt. at Belmont; I-10 near Luling; US 90 / US 183 in Luling; SH 130 Toll near Fentress; I-35 in San Marcos
- North end: RM 12 near San Marcos

Location
- Country: United States
- State: Texas

Highway system
- Highways in Texas; Interstate; US; State; Former; Toll; Loops; Spurs; FM/RM; Park; Rec
← US 80	→ US 81

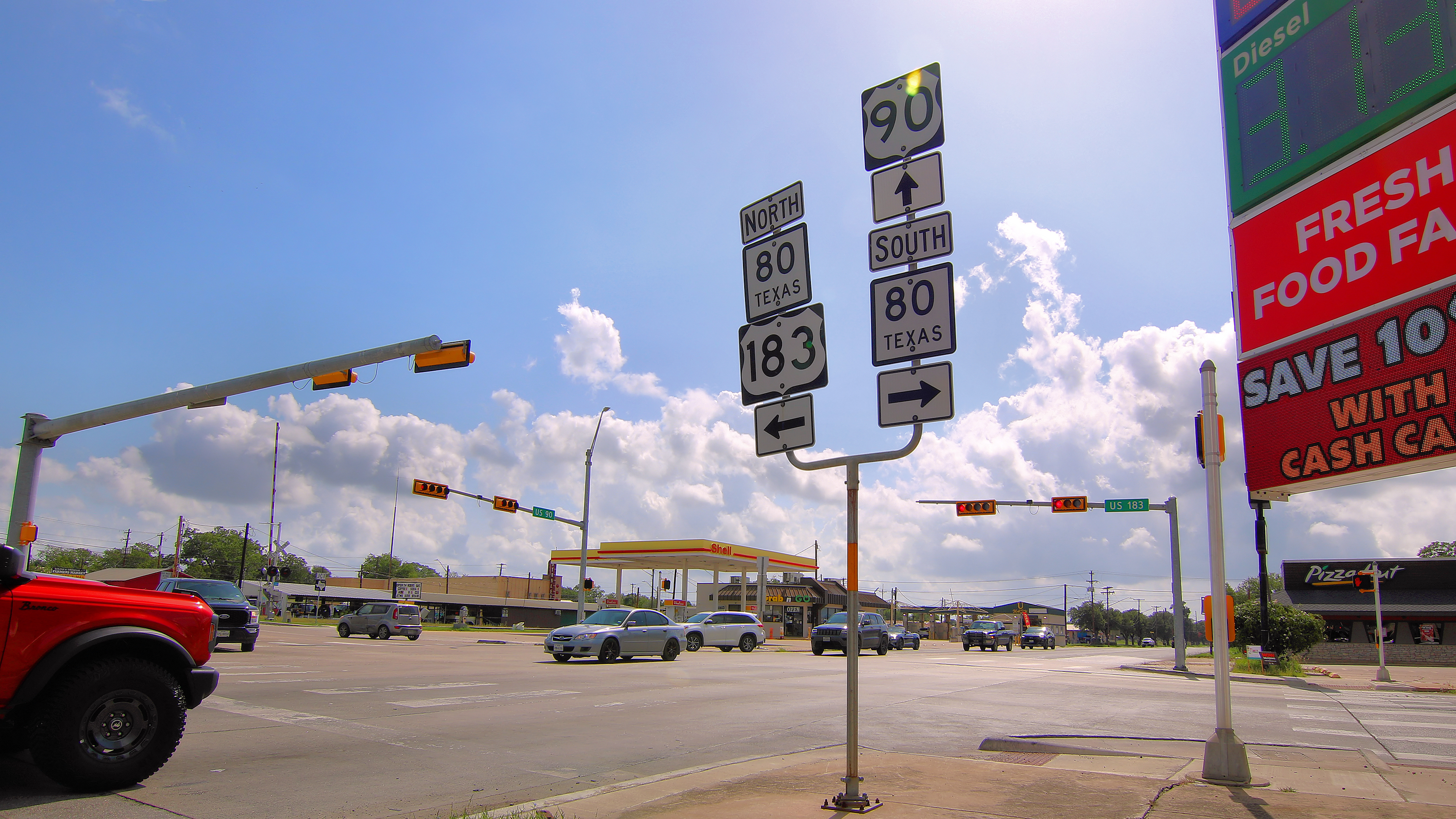
The intersection of U.S. Route 183 and State Highway 80 in Luling, Texas.

State Highway 80 (SH 80) is a state highway in the U.S. state of Texas that runs 93 miles (150 km) from Karnes City to San Marcos.

== History ==
The original highway was designated on August 21, 1923 from San Marcos to Luling, replacing most of SH 29A (the rest of SH 29A was cancelled). On October 12, 1925, SH 80 was extended to Wimberley, but this did not take effect until January 1, 1926. On April 6, 1932, SH 80 had a planned extension south to Nixon designated. On February 13, 1934, SH 80 was extended west to south of Blanco. On July 17, 1934, it was rerouted to end in Refugio over part of SH 29. This change was undone on January 19, 1935. On July 15, 1935, the section west of Wimberley was cancelled. On September 22, 1936, SH 80 was extended to Karnes City, replacing a portion of SH 112. On September 26, 1939, SH 80 was extended southwest to the Atascosa–Karnes county line, replacing SH 312. On February 20, 1940, the section from Karnes City to the Atascosa–Karnes county line was cancelled. On March 26, 1942, the section from Wimberley to San Marcos was transferred to Ranch to Market Road 12. On December 4, 1952, SH 80 was extended over old US 181 to new US 181. On June 21, 1990, this extension was cancelled, as it became part of Business US 181. On June 24, 2010, RM 12 was shifted to an alignment south of San Marcos, and the SH 80 designation was extended through the city to a terminus with RM 12 west of the city. On January 26, 2017, the section of SH 80 from RM 12 to Loop 82 was removed from the state highway system and was given to the city of San Marcos.

== Major intersections ==
County	Location	mi	km	Destinations	Notes
Karnes	Karnes City	0.0– 1.4	0.0– 2.3	Bus. US 181 (Calvert Avenue) / SH 123 south (Badger Drive) – Kenedy	Southern terminus; south end of SH 123 concurrency
Karnes	Karnes City	1.9	3.1	SH 123 north (Badger Drive) – Stockdale	North end of SH 123 concurrency
Karnes		6.6	10.6	FM 792	
Karnes	Helena	8.0	12.9	FM 81 – Runge	
Karnes		11.7	18.8	FM 1354	
Karnes		14.9	24.0	FM 627 – Ecleto	
Karnes	Gillett	20.5	33.0	Spur 190 to FM 887	
Karnes	Gillett	20.7	33.3	SH 119 – Stockdale, Yorktown	
Wilson	No major junctions				
Gonzales	Nixon	30.8	49.6	US 87 / SH 97 south (Central Avenue) – Stockdale, Cuero	South end of SH 97 concurrency
Gonzales	Nixon	31.0	49.9	FM 1681	
Gonzales	Leesville	33.0	53.1	FM 1117 north – Seguin	
Gonzales	Leesville	35.0	56.3	SH 97 north – Gonzales	North end of SH 97 concurrency
Gonzales	Leesville	40.6	65.3	FM 1682	
Gonzales	Leesville	47.5	76.4	FM 466 east – Cost	
Gonzales	Belmont	47.5	76.4	FM 466 west – Seguin	
Gonzales	Belmont	49.7	80.0	US 90 Alt. – Seguin, Gonzales	
Guadalupe		57.4	92.4	FM 1150	
Guadalupe	Luling	58.6– 58.7	94.3– 94.5	I-10 – Seguin, San Antonio, Schulenburg, Houston	I-10 exit 628
Caldwell	Luling	60.9	98.0	US 90 / US 183 south (Pierce Street)	South end of US 183 concurrency
Caldwell	Luling	61.1	98.3	US 183 north (Magnolia Avenue)	North end of US 183 concurrency
Caldwell	Stairtown	66.6	107.2	FM 671	
Caldwell	Fentress	70.6	113.6	FM 20 – Seguin, Lockhart	
Caldwell		72.5– 72.6	116.7– 116.8	SH 130 Toll (Pickle Parkway) – San Antonio, Seguin, Lockhart, Austin, Waco	
Caldwell		80.6	129.7	FM 1977 – Staples	
Caldwell		77.8	125.2	FM 1979	
Caldwell	Martindale	78.1	125.7	SH 142 east – Lockhart	South end of SH 142 concurrency
Caldwell	Martindale	80.2	129.1	FM 1984	
Hays	San Marcos	82.7	133.1	SH 21 east (Airport Highway) – Bastrop	South end of SH 21 concurrency
Hays	San Marcos	83.7– 83.8	134.7– 134.9	I-35 – San Antonio, Austin	I-35 exit 205; north end of SH 21/SH 142 concurrency
Hays	San Marcos	85.1	137.0	Loop 82 north (LBJ Drive)	
Hays	San Marcos	85.2	137.1	Loop 82 south (Guadalupe Street)	
Hays	San Marcos	85.4	137.4	FM 2439 (Hopkins Street)	
Hays	San Marcos	88.3	142.1	RM 12 – Wimberley	Northern terminus
1.000 mi = 1.609 km; 1.000 km = 0.621 mi: Concurrency terminus
