= Monthalia, Texas =

- Unincorporated community
- Location in the state of Texas
- Coordinates: 29°28′08″N 97°36′31″W
- Country: United States
- State: Texas
- County: Gonzales
- Established: 1846

Government
  - Type: Unincorporated community
- Elevation: 390 ft (120 m)

Population (2000)
  - Total: 65
- Time zone: UTC-6 (CST)
  - Summer (DST): UTC-5 (CDT)
- ZIP codes: 78614
- Area code: 830
- GNIS feature ID: 1378699

Monthalia is a small unincorporated rural community. It is located along Gonzales County Road 143. The road joins US 90A and FM 466 as a bridge across the Guadalupe River. The road bypasses neighboring Belmont. The ghost town Oak Forest and the "MA Wade Dam" lie to the north.

The community had only 65 people as of the 2000 census. It is primarily home to livestock ranchers and has no schools or businesses. Nolan Ryan Beef operates several ranches in the area raising cattle.

Monthalia was first settled in 1846. It had a church and masonic lodge by 1868 and a post office was established in 1893. The community later built a school. The school closed in 1948 and the post office was closed in 1968; both were moved a short distance to neighboring Cost.
