= Leesville, Texas =

Leesville
- unincorporated city
- Leesville, Texas
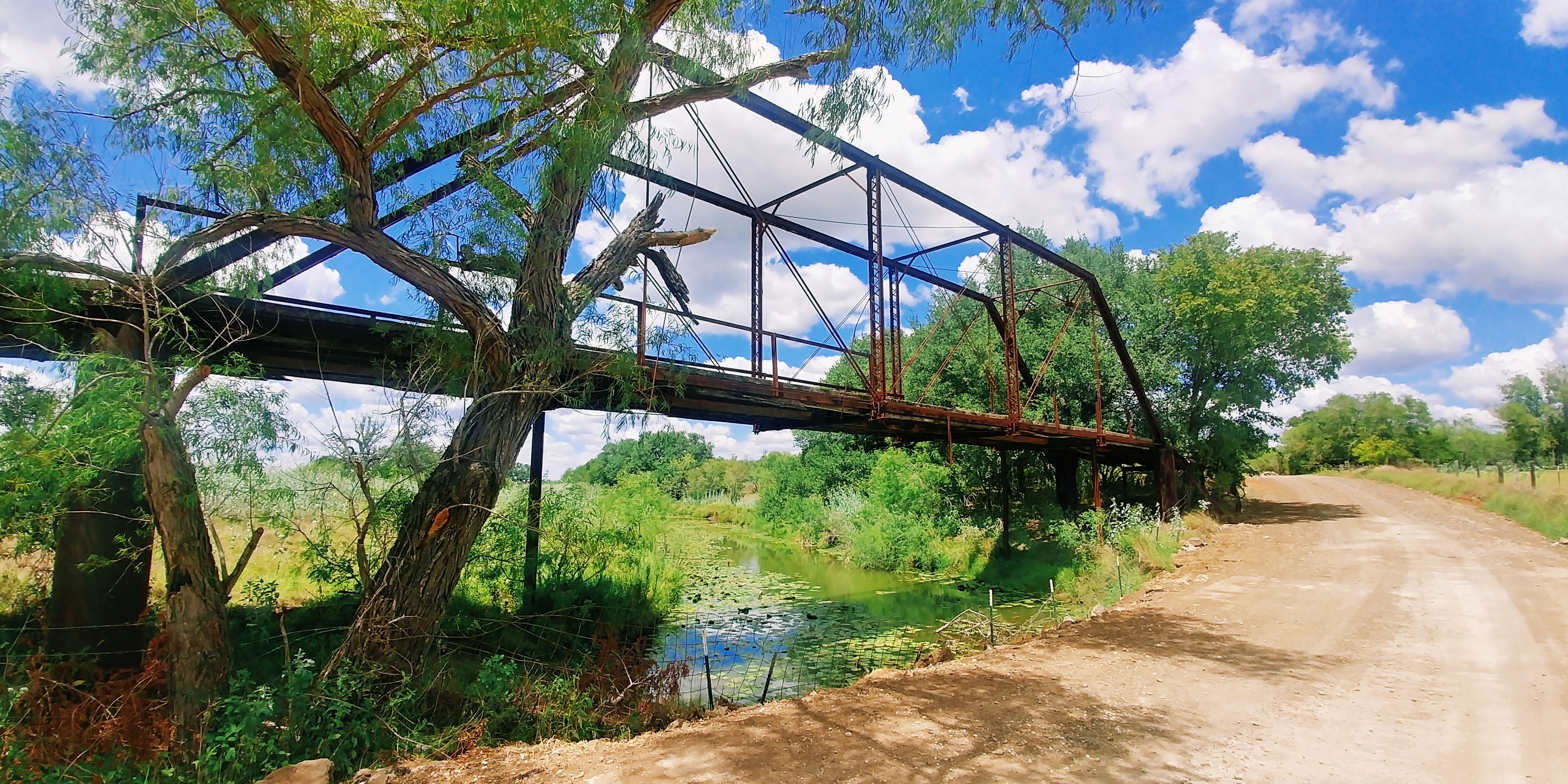
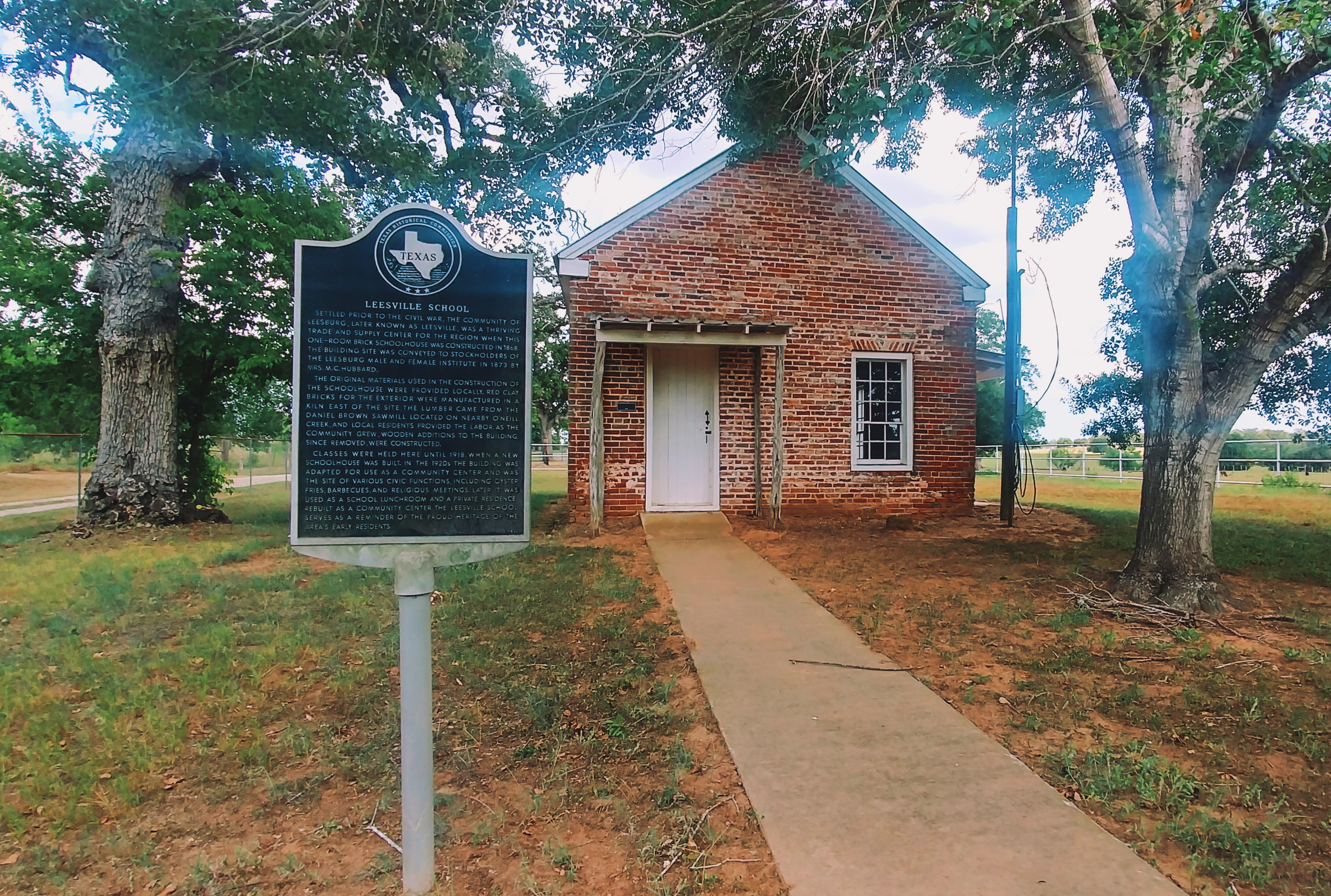
- Sandies Creek Iron Rail-Bridge c. 1899 above; Leesville historical-marker below
- Nicknames: Sandies, Capote, Leesburg, E.W. Cullen "Little Red Schoolhouse Station"
- Interactive map of Leesville
- Coordinates: 29°24′25″N 97°44′42″W
- Granted: 1806 (de la Baume)
- Settled: ca. 1830s-1861
- Founded: 1874
- Recognized: ca. 1891 (state law)
- Founded by: Newburn H. Guinn
- Named after: Lee Guinn, daughter of founder
- Precinct: Electoral Precinct 13

Government
  - Type: Court of law

Area
  - Total: 51 sq mi (130 km^{2})
  - Water: .12 sq mi (0.31 km^{2})
- Elevation: 377 ft (115 m)
- Highest elevation (Capote's Knob): 670 ft (200 m)

Population (2018-2019)
  - Total: 384
  - Density: 7.5/sq mi (2.9/km^{2})
  - Density: 238.8/sq mi (92.2/km^{2})
- Time zone: UTC−06:00 (CST)
  - Summer (DST): UTC−05:00 (CDT)
- ZIP code: 78122-9998
- Location: Southeast Guadalupe County line; West Gonzales County; South of Belmont, north of Nixon, and west of Bebe
- GNIS feature ID: 1339796

Leesville is an unincorporated city in the Gonzales-Guadalupe County area in Texas, United States. The community had a population of 384 residents as of 2018.

The town was founded in 1874 and was named Leesburg for founder Newburn H. Guinn's daughter, Lee Guinn. The town was renamed Leesville by the U.S. Postal Service and was recognized by state law in 1891.

Leesville is home to a $149 million water facility and 40-mile pipeline that stores and moves to 11.6 million gallons of water toward the Greater San Antonio area.

== History ==
=== Name ===
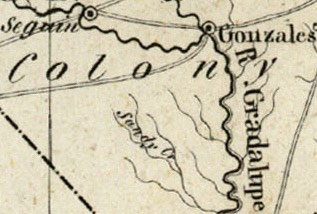
Sandy Creek, Texas (present-day Leesville) in 1839

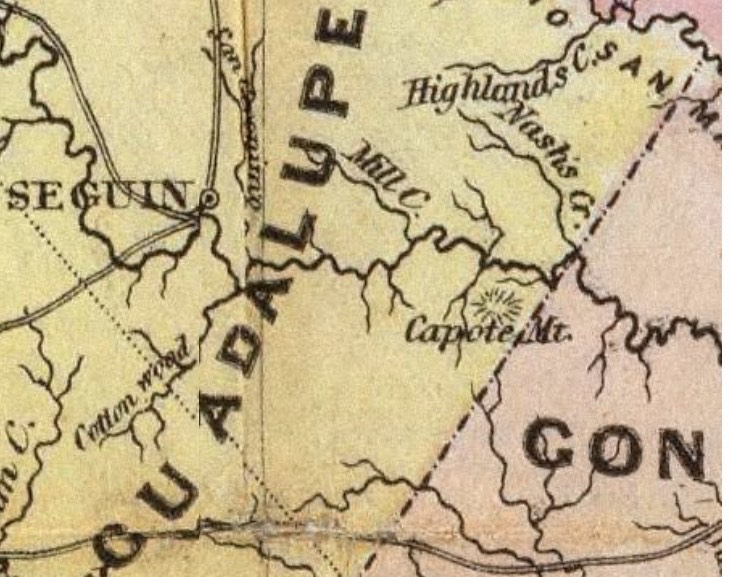
Capote, Texas (present-day Leesville) in 1856

The first settlement in Leesville began in the 1830s around Sandy Creek, said to be once landmarked by a giant granite stone. This settlement gave Leesville one of its nicknames: the Sandies. Population growth near Sandy Creek halted in the 1870s when the region's proprietor destroyed the granite landmark in retaliation to a local food theft.

The region was then named Capote, from the Spanish for "cape" or "cloak", after its Capote Hills. In the late 1800s, local land developer Newburn H. Guinn attempted to change the town's name to Leesburg after his daughter Lee. This new name was soon changed to Leesville by the local post office, which noted that another Texas town had already claimed the name Leesburg.

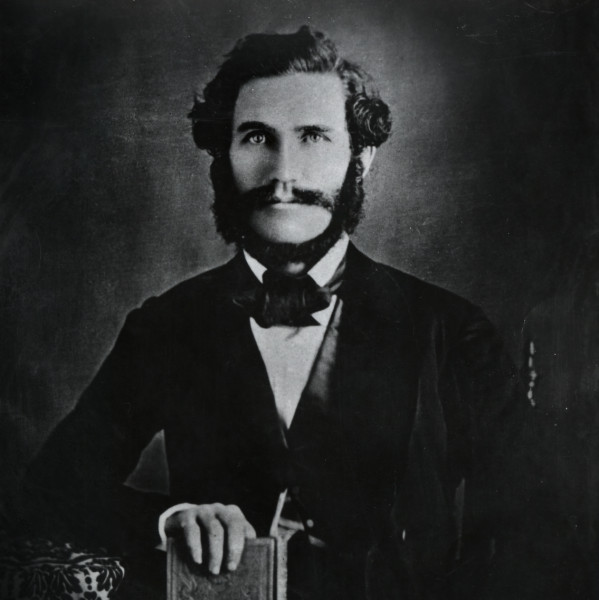
Ezekiel Wimberly Cullen, an original owner of Leesville

In the 1800s, much of south Leesville was owned by Ezekiel Wimberly Cullen, a former Congressman and Supreme Court Justice of the Republic of Texas. Cullen's ownership of this land led to another of Leesville's nicknames, the Ezekiel W. Cullen League (E.W. Cullen).

The federal government recognized Leesville, Texas in 1885 in patents "315,236" and "325,154" with the former being an "Indicator for Merchandise" and the latter being a "Marking Device." The town was officially recognized as Leesville, Texas by state law in 1891.

=== 1800s ===
In 1835, at Sandies Creek in what is now Leesville, 13 traders of Mexican and French origin traveling from Louisiana to Mexico were killed by Comanche Native Americans.

One of the earliest records of settlement of the Leesville area, interchangeably Leesburg at the time, involved common property of "the people of Leesburg," most-especially a single crowbar. The crowbar was reportedly shared by the community from 1863 until 1883, when it was thought to have been used in a local theft.

Although limited historical records of the early Leesville population exist, in the 1880s, during the election for the Texas House of Representatives, votes cast from Leesville numbered in the thousands.

==== Governor's pardon of John Hester ====
John Hester, a Leesville resident during the late 1800s, was imprisoned for the felony of stealing sheep. In 1884, in a state criminal-appeal from the District Court of Gonzales County (Robert Carr v. The State), Hester exchanged his eyewitness testimony regarding the burglary of Leesville's general store for a pardon by Texas Governor John Ireland. The pardon was later revoked upon the judgement that Hester's testimony was inadmissible and unreliable.

==== El Capote Ranch ====
El Capote Ranch, a Texas historical marker that still exists today, was founded in 1806 by Joseph de la Baume (1731–1834), a French army officer who came to North America with the Marquis de Lafayette and fought in the American Revolution. He later joined the Spanish Army and was compensated for his service with the title to 27,000 acres of Texas land in what is now Leesville, upon which he developed the original El Capote Ranch. The ranch's cabin from the 1830s (now preserved in Lubbock in the Museum of Texas Tech University) represents the earliest form of dwelling utilized on the Texas frontier.

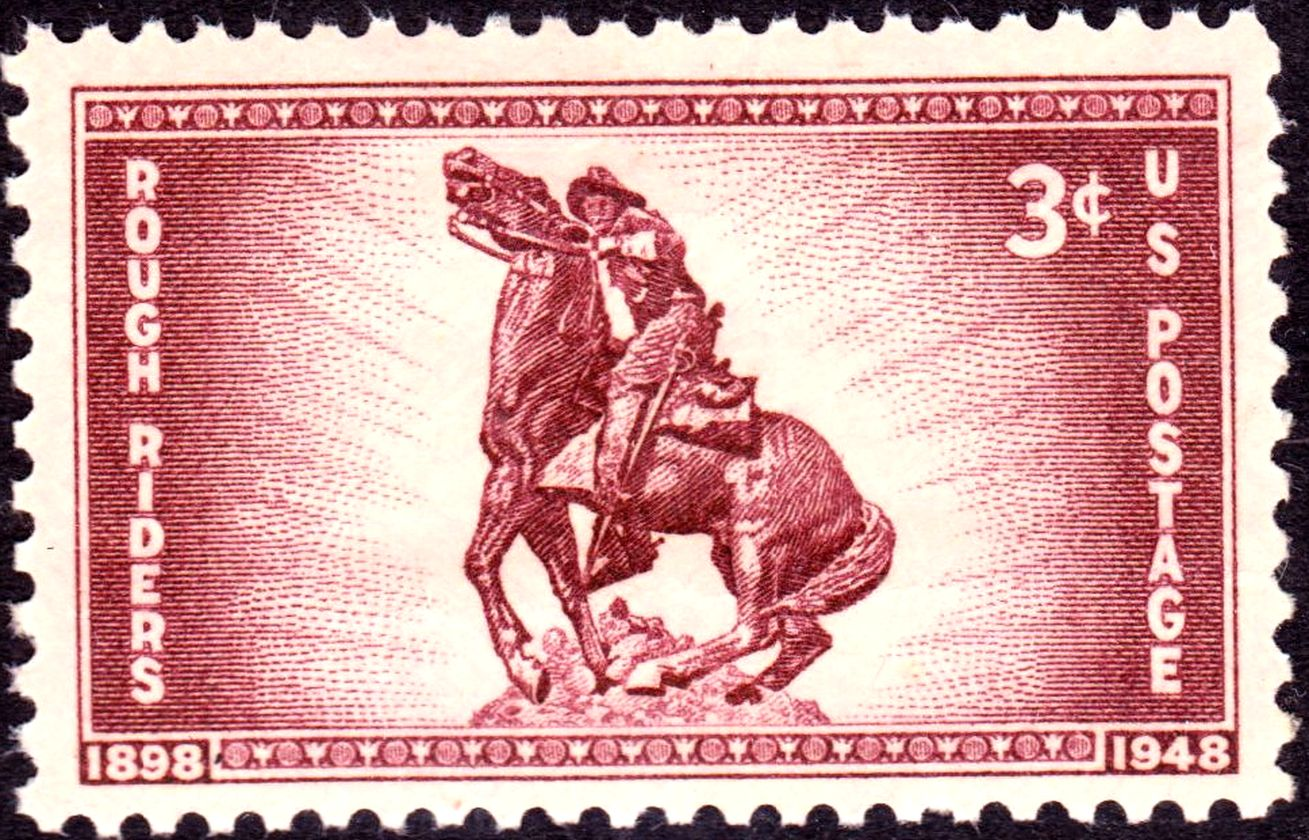
Roosevelt's 1898 horse, depicted above, is claimed to have been from the El Capote Ranch.

Virginia-born Michael Erskine (1794–1862) acquired the property from de la Baume's estate in 1840 and raised cattle there. The Erskine family hosted several eminent visitors, including William Bollaert of the British Royal Geographical Society (1840), Ferdinand von Roemer (1845–1847), and Frederick Law Olmsted (1857).

After the Erskine family sold the ranch in the 1870s, part of the land was deeded to Edith Kermit Carow, the second wife of Theodore Roosevelt. During the Spanish–American War, Roosevelt rode a horse from the ranch, named Seguin, at the 1898 Battle of San Juan Hill. Several other horses from El Capote were used by the 1st United States Volunteer Cavalry ("Roosevelt's Rough Riders") as well.

In 1880, the San Antonio Express newspaper rated the Capote Ranch as "the largest and most complete farm in Texas... if not in the south," giving examples of the diversity of livestock and crops that were raised at the scale of 75 workers over 20,000 acres. The farm's stock included 2,800 heads of cattle, 6,000 Berkshire pigs and various other types of livestock and agriculture.

The ranch was acquired in 1897 by Judge Leroy Gilbert Denman (1855–1916), a justice of the Texas Supreme Court, and is currently owned by his descendants. At present day, the property's remaining estate has generated significant caselaw in Texas in ConocoPhillips Co. v. Ramirez, in which the rights to the minerals beneath the ranch's soil were contested.

George W. Littlefield, notable former resident of Leesville

==== Littlefield-Martin feud and legacy ====
In 1880, two generations of the Leesville families Littlefield and Martin received national attention after three Littlefield family members died in a revolver gunfight between the two families. The late George W. Littlefield was the grandson of one of the deceased Littlefields. In 1883, George Littlefield relocated to the state capital of Austin, Texas from South Texas. His Littlefield Building on Congress Avenue in downtown Austin now houses Capital One Bank. From 1895 to 1903, Littlefield also owned the Driskill Hotel, located near the Littlefield Building. He installed the first electric lighting system in the hotel, which became a gathering place for Texas politicians during much of the 20th century. He willed his residence, the Littlefield House, to the University of Texas.

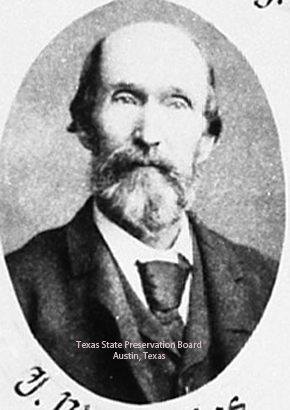
James W. Peebles, Leesville District Rep.; 21st-22nd Texas Legislature

==== Peebles' election ====
In 1889, over a thousand people of the Leesville general area elected the Representative James William Peebles for the local legislative seat without Peebles' direct involvement in the campaign. Peebles had lived in Leesville since 1869, but he had never exhibited any "political aspirations." Despite having no previous political experience, Peebles won the legislative seat by a margin of a thousand votes. In 1891, he was elected to a second term in the same Leesville district.

=== 1900s ===
A 1904 voting press-record from The Houston Post indicated that at least 708 ballots were cast in Leesville during a primary election. Five years later, in 1909, over a dozen cases of smallpox were reported around Leesville, with African Americans disproportionately affected.

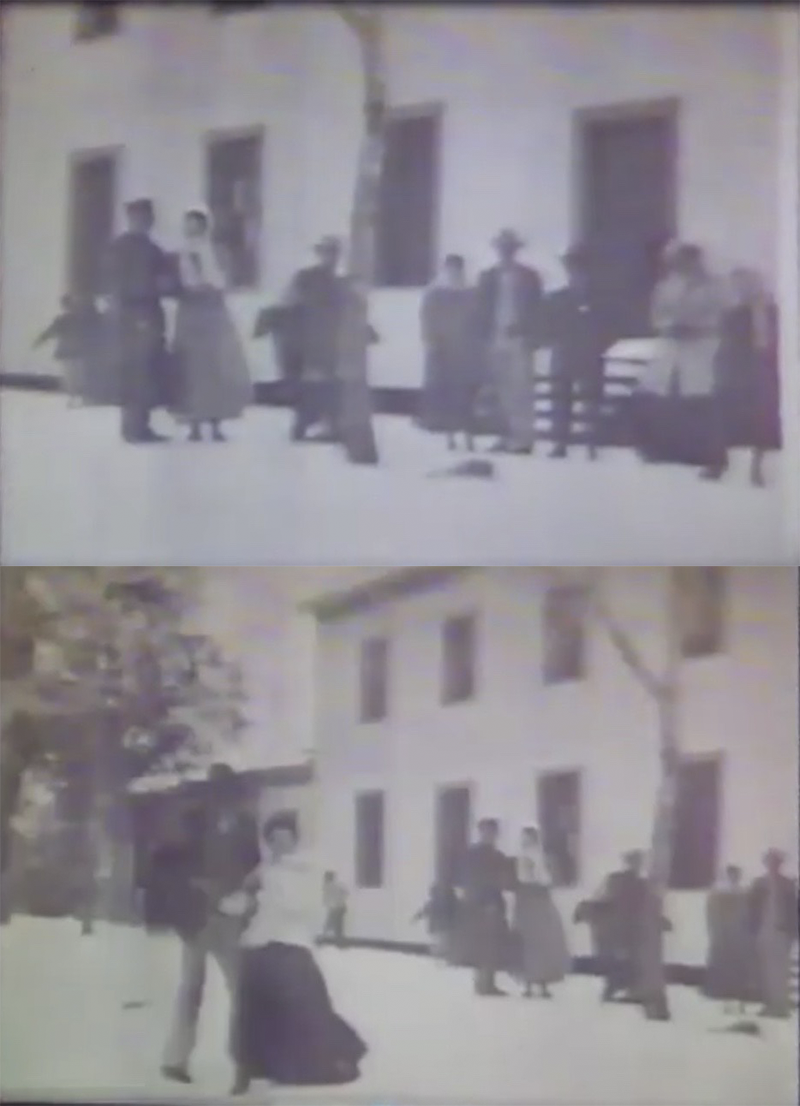
Downtown Leesville, early 1900s

==== Farmer's union ====
As late as 1906, Leesville farmers were majorly unionized under the Leesville Farmers' Union, a focus of Thomas Mitchell Campbell's 1906 Texas gubernatorial election

==== Railroads ====
In March 1912, the Quanah, Acme and Pacific Railway was built 2.5 miles east of Leesville. During the same time period, engineers of the Quanah, Seymour, Dublin and Rockport Railroad completed a preliminary survey for the construction of another railroad through Leesville itself.

In 1916, an electric railway contract was awarded to J. H. Berryman & Co., served by its president Steve Holmes from Leesville. The 190-mile line was proposed to reach San Antonio from Houston, stopping at Richmond, Garwood, Gonzales, Holmes' home of Leesville, Willow Springs and New Berlin. The expected material cost was written as "530,000 cross-ties," "16,000,000 feet of lumber" and "32,000 poles." This was considered a notable prospective order for the lumber industry at the time, but the proposal was never further developed.

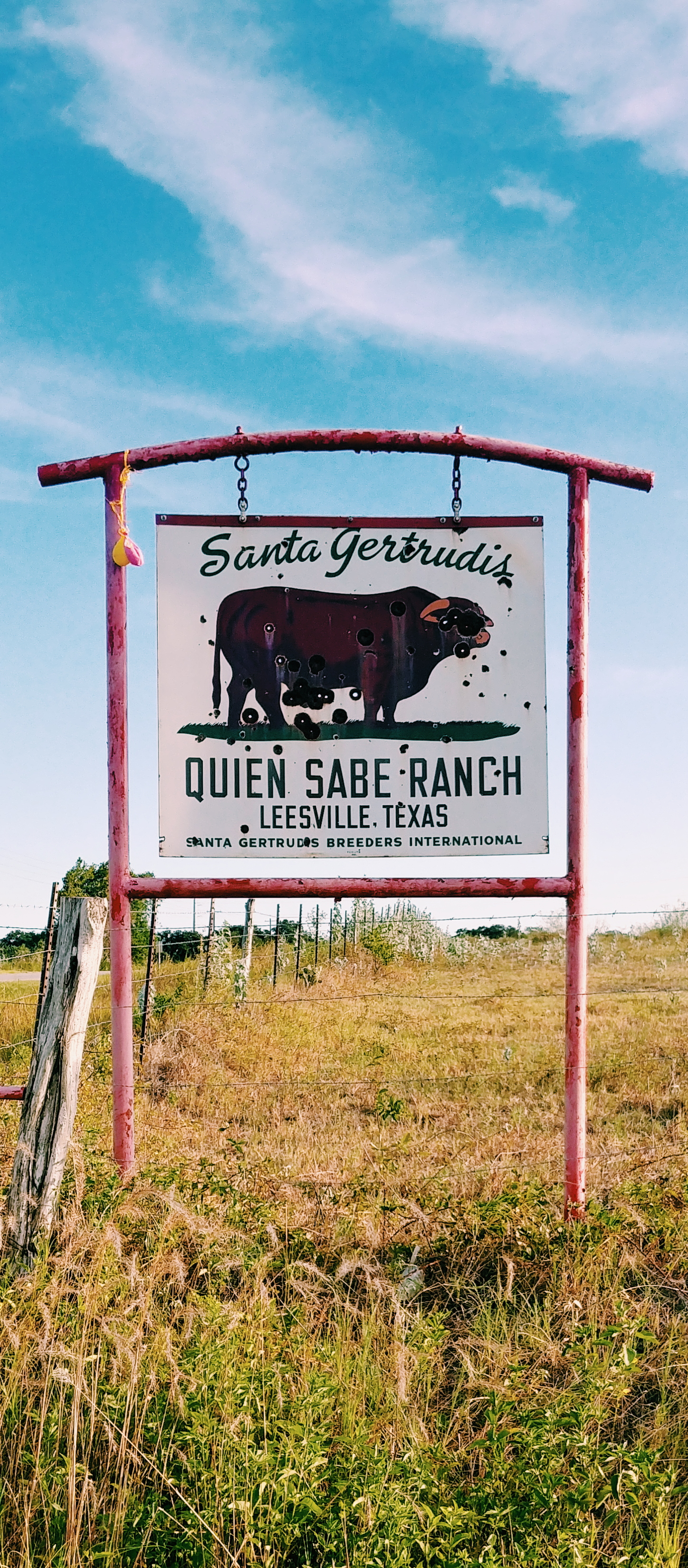
Leesville's former sign, now stolen

=== 2000s ===
In late 2020, a porcelain sign weighing approximately 150 pounds was stolen from Leesville's Quien Sabe Ranch. It landmarked the northern area of Leesville at County Road 102 and SH 80. A $1000 reward was circulated "for information about the theft."

== Economy ==
As of 2000, Leesville was home to seven businesses that earned an estimated $1.3 million total in 2016. From 1999 to 2018, the aggregate household income for the city ranged from $7.8-$10.6 million annually. All commercial and residential properties in Leesville paid a combined estimate of $192,500 in property taxes in 2016.

Leesville is commonly used by through-traffic as a bypass route for Texas State Highway 123. In 2019 as rated by the Texas Department of Transportation, the aggregate annual-average-daily-traffic (AADT) of all local state highway-segments, that intersected into the Capote-Sandies-Leesville area, was rated at 12,179 vehicles. The Midtown-Downtown Texas State Highway 80/Farm to Market Road 1682 intersection was rated at 2,978 vehicles.

At present, the primary industries of the Leesville area are the real estate holdings of Texas Wildlife Management and the Quien Sabe Ranch that raises Santa Gertrudis cattle of King Ranch Running W Bull descent.

=== Water facility and pipeline ===
A notable component of the Leesville economy is the town's large water facility and pipeline. Owned by the Schertz-Seguin Local Government Corporation (SSLGC), the 40-mile pipeline transports water from the local Carrizo Aquifer to the greater San Antonio area.

The construction of the water facility and pipeline was arranged in 2012 at a reported cost of $149-million. In 2014, this facility was permitted to pump 19,363 acre-feet of water per year, with a then-present utilization of 10,000 acre-feet. Over 60,000 households can be sustained through this water supply. The location of the SSLGC water facility in Leesville, between Gonzales and Guadalupe Counties, was a strategic choice to mitigate cost and provide long-term reliability of the water source for nearby cities. As of 2016, the system can store up to 11.6 million gallons of water.

Fitch Ratings remarked on this water company's inability to directly assign liabilities to either the City of Schertz or Seguin. It has also remarked that COVID-19 has not affected the demand of water from the facility. From 2016 to 2020, the facility made over $9.2 million in revenue each year. In addition to serving the greater San Antonio area, the water facility and pipeline serve additional cities such as Selma and Universal City.

== Geography ==
Leesville is located at the southeastern Guadalupe County line in west Gonzales County, approximately 19 miles south of U.S. 183 North in Luling (Greater Austin) and 26 miles west of U.S. 183 South in Gonzales. The historical city center of Leesville is located alongside Farm to Market Road 1682, where the city's original church and cemetery reside; both of which currently serve as locations for local events.

=== Historical descriptions of landscape ===
In 1830, surveyor Byrd Lockhart described the lands beyond the river as composed of rolling prairie and sandy hills covered with post oaks and blackjack oaks.

In 1846, geologist Dr. Ferdinand von Roemer further described the area as composed of "fertile valleys" and "low hills... of gravel sand" with "farms every few miles."

In 1851, William Bollaert of the Royal Geographical Society became lost in the Leesville area, which he described as the "Big Hill prairies." He found the soil to be "rich looking" and "black." He further reported encountering herds of mustangs, wolves, and forests of pecan trees. Near Guadalupe River, Bollaert found the land "fit for all agricultural purposes, although the surface soil is sandy," with chiltepin peppers "most abundant." The main Capote Hill was described as a "conspicuous object...isolated in the prairie" Within the hill, he found disintegrated limestone, gypsum, oyster and other shells comprising a great variety of former marine life.

In 1852, Frederick Law Olmsted, the then-future designer of New York City's Central Park, noted the area's principal species of trees as pecan, hickory, cypress, cotton wood, box elder, white oak and walnut. He described the bottom land's "rich, black clay soil" as difficult to cultivate yet "producing high yields" of crops.

=== Climate ===
The Leesville-Belmont area has an annual average of 33.1 inches and 35.8 days of rainfall. The average day consists of 12.6 hours of light. Temperatures are high with very mild winters, with the climate generally described as humid subtropical.

==== Flooding ====
During Tropical Depression Eight of 1981, several dwellings in and around Leesville suffered water damage after the O'Neill Creek reached its highest level since at least 1936. Leesville experienced some part of the county's $5 million estimated damages caused by the storm.

=== Nearby ghost towns ===
The following former towns once existed along the border of Leesville:

- Albuquerque, Texas
- Dewville, Texas
- Sandies Chapel, Texas

=== Infrastructure ===
The following highways pass through Leesville:

- SH 80
- SH 97
- FM 466
- FM 1117
- FM 1682

== Population and land ownership ==
Historical population
Year	Pop.	±%
1860*	70	—
1880*	1,000	+1328.6%
1900*	708	−29.2%
2000	201	−71.6%
2010	418	+108.0%
2018**	384	−8.1%
Census/Voting Records; Military Records *≥ **Estimated

As of 2018, Leesville was rated as having 249 residential structures. An estimated majority of homes (40.5%) in the area were built from 1980 to 1999. The estimated median year Leesville homes were moved into was 1996. No residential structures have been approved and built in Leesville since 2014, as recorded by the census in 2017.

The local median cost of housing, as of 2018, ranged from $546 to $633 per month; with the households of the city paying an aggregate $23,500 in annual property taxes. In estimation, of local workers 16 years and over who do not work at home, 16% commute within five minutes to reach their place of work, 28% commute 15 to 24 minutes, and 56% commute half an hour or more.

From 2000 to 2018, all occupied residential real estate in Leesville was valued from $13.9 to 19.6-million, leading to a residential value density of more than $400 per acre. As of 2020, vacant and undeveloped Leesville land sold at $4,649 per acre.

== Education ==
Public education in Leesville is provided by Gonzales Independent School District, Nixon-Smiley Consolidated Independent School District and Seguin Independent School District. Since 1998, an organization known as the Happy Quilters has produced quilts for auction at the annual Leesville Country Fair to supporting local education and maintain Leesville landmarks such as the Leesville school house by raising $1,000 or more in support per quilt.

== Culture ==
Michael Erskine, a founding settler of the Leesville area, described the values of its people summarily in 1845: "I move along here as well as I can—work hard, live poor and am respected by the poor chaps. There are but few rich people in this part of the country. And no claims to be superior to another on account of his wealth."

=== Folklore ===
In folklore, locals claim to see a ghost of a little girl in a blue dress playing in the Leesville Cemetery. She is reportedly seen only at a significant distance.

=== Notable people ===
- Frank E. Corley (1895-1924)—African-American LAPD officer born in Leesville who was shot and killed while on duty
- John Beecher (1904-1980)—descendant of Harriet Beecher Stowe who reported on Leesville working conditions and labor unionism

== See also ==
- Texas Blackland Prairies
- Albuquerque, Texas
- Bebe, Texas
