= Farm to Market Road 466 =

Road in Texas, USA

Farm to Market Road 466

Route information
- Maintained by TxDOT
- Length: 34.392 mi (55.349 km)
- Existed: July 9, 1945–present

Major junctions
- West end: US 90 / US 90 Alt. in Seguin
- East end: FM 108 southwest of Gonzales

Location
- Country: United States
- State: Texas
- Counties: Guadalupe, Gonzales County

Highway system
- Highways in Texas; Interstate; US; State; Former; Toll; Loops; Spurs; FM/RM; Park; Rec

Farm to Market Road 466 (FM 466) is a farm to market road, a state maintained road which serves to connect the agricultural area Leesville-Belmont to market towns, in the U.S. state of Texas. It is located in Guadalupe and Gonzales counties. The road is 34.4 miles (55.4 km) long.

== Route description ==
The road begins at an intersection with US 90 on the east side of Seguin, crosses US 90 Alt., heading south to cross the Guadalupe River. From there, it goes east, passing through Monthalia. At Cost, it joins SH 97, just south of Gonzales.

Capote Road passes through a rural area that at one time was heavily farmed. In more recent years more of the sandy land has been given over to pastures, and reverted to post oak woodlands, which support a good population of wildlife, including wild turkeys and deer. The Guadalupe River runs more or less parallel a mile or two to the north, much of its bottomlands filled with pecan orchards. Old Baldy and the other Capote Hills rising above the flatlands provided a landmark for travelers in the pioneer days. Wildflower season sees groups of phlox and fields of bluebonnets, rose cups and buttercups, then gaillardia or Indian blankets, and sunflowers and nettles in the summer, sometimes punctuated by clusters of colorful blossoms on prickly pear cactus.

== History ==
FM 466 was originally designated for 5.5 miles (8.9 km) from Seguin to Canton Creek, on July 9, 1945, following Capote Road, which had already been in use for 150 years or more.[1] It crossed the Guadalupe River where there had been an "old bridge". That bridge was replaced by a new bridge around 1970. On January 29, 1949, FM 466 was extended north from US 90 Alt. to US 90. On May 23, 1951, FM 466 was extended east 2.0 miles (3.2 km). On December 18 of that year, FM 466 was extended east 6.1 miles (9.8 km). On May 2, 1962, FM 466 was extended east to the Gonzales County line. On May 24, 1962, FM 466 was extended to Cost connecting with FM 108, just south of Gonzales, replacing FM 1297. On January 27, 1968, the section from US 90 to US 90 Alt. was cancelled. On November 25, 1976, FM 466 was extended north from US 90 Alt. to US 90, undoing the last change.

Capote Road connected El Capote Ranch in the Capote Hills of eastern Guadalupe County with the old town of Seguin. (See the Historic Marker at entrance to the ranch). El Capote Ranch began with a Spanish land grant. In 1840 it was bought by Michael Erskine, who took cattle drives to California in 1854 and 1861.

After the Civil War, freed slaves who had worked for their master in a pottery began their own operations on Capote Road. H. Wilson & Company become the first successful business owned by African Americans in Texas (Historic Marker at Capote Baptist Church.)

At Cost, less than a mile after FM 466 meets SH 97, a memorial marks the location of the Battle of Gonzales between Mexican soldiers who had come to reclaim a cannon loaned to the Anglo settlers to fight off Indians. The settlers flew a defiant flag of a cannon, a star, and the words "Come and Take It" as exchanged fire with the Mexicans, who soon withdrew. These were the first shots fired in the struggle for Texas Independence. A 100-year-old marker with bronze and stone sculptured reliefs by the Italian-born San Antonio artist Pompeo Coppini marks the spot. (Coppini sculpted the Cenotaph at the Alamo, the Littlefield Fountain at the University of Texas, the "Sul" Ross statue on the Texas A&M campus, and the Sam Houston Grave Monument, among many other works.)

== Junction list ==
County	Location	mi	km	Destinations	Notes
Guadalupe	Seguin			US 90 – San Antonio, Luling	
Guadalupe	Seguin			US 90 Alt. – Seguin, Gonzales	
Guadalupe	Seguin			SH 123 – San Marcos, Stockdale	
Guadalupe	West Capote Hills			FM 1117 south – Nixon	
Gonzales	Leesville			SH 80 south – Nixon	
Gonzales	Belmont			SH 80 north – Luling	
Gonzales	Cost			SH 97 – Gonzales, Waelder	
1.000 mi = 1.609 km; 1.000 km = 0.621 mi
