= Glaze City, Texas =

- Unincorporated community
- Location within Texas Location within the United States
- Coordinates: 29°24′26″N 97°17′19″W
- Country: United States
- State: Texas
- County: Gonzales
- Elevation: 272 ft (83 m)
- Time zone: UTC-6 (Central (CST))
  - Summer (DST): UTC-5 (CDT)
- Area code: 830
- GNIS feature ID: 1378360

Glaze City is an unincorporated community in Gonzales County, Texas, United States. The community is located along Farm to Market Road 443 in the eastern part of the county.

== History ==
Glaze City was founded in 1926; it took its name from one of its promoters. The community's population peaked at 90 in the 1940s, declined to ten by 1989, and as of 2000, its population was still ten.
