= Texas State Highway 97 =

State highway in Texas

State Highway 97
- SH 97 highlighted in red

Route information
- Maintained by TxDOT
- Length: 143.746 mi (231.337 km)
- Existed: 1924–present

Major junctions
- West end: I-35 BL in Cotulla
- US 281 in Pleasanton; I-37 near Pleasanton; US 181 in Floresville; US 87 near Stockdale; US 87 in Nixon; US 183 in Gonzales; US 90 Alt. in Gonzales; I-10 near Waelder
- East end: US 90 in Waelder

Location
- Country: United States
- State: Texas

Highway system
- Highways in Texas; Interstate; US; State; Former; Toll; Loops; Spurs; FM/RM; Park; Rec
← SH 96	→ SH 98

State Highway 97 (SH 97) is a state highway running 143 miles (230 km) from Cotulla to Waelder in the U.S. state of Texas.

== History ==
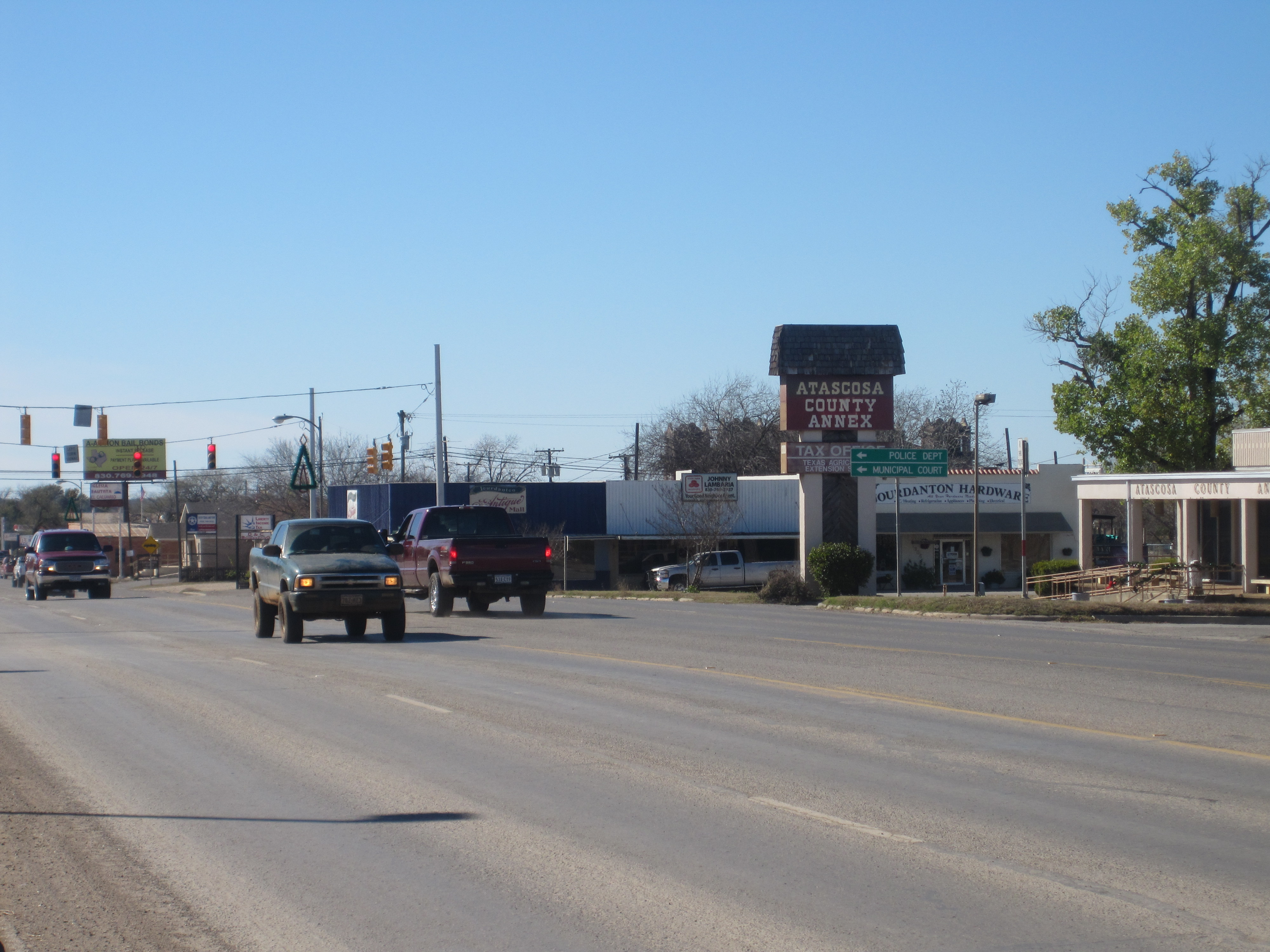
Texas Highway 97 in Jourdanton, the seat of Atascosa County, with the county annex building on the right

SH 97 was designated on July 18, 1924, as a route from Pleasanton to Jourdanton. On September 19, 1928, SH 97 was extended south to Rio Grande City via Hebbronville and Tilden; this extension was cancelled on June 25, 1929, and SH 97 was instead extended to Fowlerton; On November 30, 1932, a second section of SH 97 was added from Rio Grande City to Hebbronville, with the possibility of these sections being connected in the future.

On February 12, 1934, the northern section extended along a new route to Floresville. (causing the cancellation of SH 168 south of there). On March 13, 1934, the northern section extended to Stockdale, replacing SH 168. The southern stretch from Hebbronville to Rio Grande City and the section from Pleasanton to Floresville were cancelled on July 15, 1935. The section from Pleasanton to Floresville was restored on September 22, 1936.

On December 22, 1937, SH 97 was truncated to Jourdanton, and the section south of there became SH 93, but this change was reverted by April 1, 1938. The highway was slowly constructed, initially between Stockdale and Fowlerton by 1939.

On July 31, 1942, a section of SH 72 between Fowlerton and Cotulla was added. It was extended to its current terminus in Waelder on March 28, 1952, replacing the western portions of SH 200 and SH 3. On April 27, 1995, SH 97 was relocated in Gonzales.

== Junction list ==
County	Location	mi	km	Destinations	Notes
La Salle	Cotulla	0.000	0.000	I-35 BL – Laredo, Dilley	Western terminus
La Salle	Cotulla			FM 624 east	
La Salle	Los Angeles			FM 469	
McMullen				SH 72 east – Tilden	
McMullen				FM 1582 west – Pearsall	
Atascosa	Charlotte			SH 85 west – Dilley	
Atascosa	Charlotte			FM 140 – Pearsall, Campbellton	
Atascosa	Charlotte			FM 1333 north	
Atascosa				Spur 162 east	
Atascosa	Jourdanton			SH 16 – Poteet, Tilden	
Atascosa	Pleasanton			FM 3510 north	
Atascosa	Pleasanton			US 281 south – George West	West end of US 281 overlap
Atascosa	Pleasanton			US 281 north – San Antonio	East end of US 281 overlap
Atascosa				I-37 – San Antonio, Corpus Christi	I-37 exit 109
Atascosa				FM 1784 north	
Wilson				FM 478 south	
Wilson				FM 2505	
Wilson				FM 3161 south	
Wilson				FM 1344 south	
Wilson	Floresville			Loop 181	
Wilson	Floresville			US 181 south – Karnes City	West end of US 181 overlap
Wilson	Floresville			US 181 north – San Antonio	East end of US 181 overlap
Wilson				FM 539 north – Sutherland Springs	
Wilson				FM 1922 south	
Wilson				US 87 north – San Antonio	West end of US 87 overlap
Wilson	Stockdale			Bus. US 87 south – Stockdale	
Wilson	Stockdale			SH 123 – Seguin, Karnes City	Interchange
Wilson	Stockdale			SH 119 south – Gillett	
Wilson				Bus. US 87 north – Stockdale	
Wilson				FM 538 east	
Wilson				FM 1347 south	
Wilson	Pandora			FM 1107 west	
Gonzales	Nixon			US 87 south / SH 80 south – Cuero, Gillett	East end of US 87 overlap; West end of SH 80 overlap
Gonzales	Nixon			FM 1681 north	
Gonzales	Leesville			FM 1117 north – Seguin	
Gonzales	Leesville			SH 80 north – Luling	East end of SH 80 overlap
Gonzales				FM 2922 south	
Gonzales	Bebe			FM 1682 west – Leesville	
Gonzales	Cost			FM 466 west	West end of FM 466 overlap
Gonzales	Cost			FM 466 east	East end of FM 466 overlap
Gonzales	Cost			Spur 95 north – Gonzales Battlefield Monument	
Gonzales				FM 108 south – Smiley	
Gonzales				FM 1116 south	
Gonzales				US 183 south / SH 111 south – Cuero, Yoakum	West end of US 183 overlap
Gonzales	Gonzales			Bus. US 183 north	
Gonzales	Gonzales			Spur 146 east	
Gonzales	Gonzales			US 183 north / US 90 Alt. west – Luling, Seguin	East end of US 183 overlap; West end of US 90 Alt. overlap
Gonzales	Gonzales			Bus. US 183	
Gonzales	Gonzales			FM 794 north	
Gonzales	Gonzales			Spur 131 north	
Gonzales	Gonzales			US 90 Alt. east – Shiner	East end of US 90 Alt. overlap
Gonzales	Gonzales			Spur 131 south	
Gonzales				SH 304 north	
Gonzales				FM 2814 south	
Gonzales				I-10 – San Antonio, Houston	I-10 exit 649
Gonzales	Waelder	143.746	231.337	US 90 / FM 1115 north – Luling, Flatonia	Eastern terminus
1.000 mi = 1.609 km; 1.000 km = 0.621 mi: Concurrency terminus
