= Saturn, Texas =

Saturn
- Unincorporated community
- Interactive map of Saturn
- Location within Texas Saturn (the United States)
- Coordinates: 29°35′56″N 97°20′37″W
- Country: United States
- State: Texas
- County: Gonzales County

Saturn is an unincorporated area located along State Highway 97 in northeastern Gonzales County, Texas, United States.

== History ==
The community was initially established in the 1870s and went through several name changes over time; those names were Possum Trot, Prickly Bear, and Ettowa. The community's current name, Saturn, was finalized sometime before the community had its own post office in 1902, in which it would close in 1914.

By 1914, the settlement had a general store, a gin, a blacksmith shop, a grocery, a telephone connection, as well as a population of 35. By 1965, its population dropped to 15, in which its population count then remained stagnant until the 2000s. The 2003 county highway maps suggests that only a cemetery remains in the site.

In 1882, Hugh and Elizabeth McMillan donated 2 acres (0.81 ha) to the Good Hope Primitive Baptist Church for it to be utilized as Saturn's community cemetery. A cemetery association was then formed in 1974 as an oversight to the cemetery's activities.
