= Lake Gonzales =

- Location within Texas Location within the United States
- Location: Gonzales County, Texas
- Coordinates: 29°30.08′N 97°37.90′W
- Type: Hydroelectric reservoir
- Primary inflows: Guadalupe River
- Primary outflows: Guadalupe River
- Basin countries: United States
- Surface area: 696 acres (282 ha)
- Water volume: 7,500 acre⋅ft (9,300,000 m^{3})
- Surface elevation: 333 ft (101 m)

Lake Gonzales was a reservoir on the Guadalupe River 4 miles (6 km) southeast of the town of Belmont in Gonzales County, Texas. The reservoir was formed in 1931 by the construction of a dam to provide hydroelectric power to the area. Management of the dam and lake was assumed by the Guadalupe-Blanco River Authority on May 1, 1963.

Lake Gonzales is also known locally as H-4 Reservoir or Guadalupe Reservoir H-4.

On August 3, 2021, the hydroelectric dam at Lake Gonzales in Gonzales County experienced a spillway gate failure during normal operation. As a result, the lake lost 12 feet of water, leaving what were formerly waterfront homes and lakeside docks dry.

It remains unknown how the dam might be repaired, or if it can be repaired.

Until the spillway gate failure, Lake Gonzales was maintained at a constant level year round, and provided a popular destination for outdoor recreation, including fishing, boating, swimming, camping and picnicking.

== Fish and plant life ==
Lake Gonzales was stocked with species of fish intended to improve the utility of the reservoir for recreational fishing. Fish that were present in Lake Gonzales included catfish, white crappie, sunfish, sunfish, and largemouth bass. Vegetation that was in the lake included cattail, pondweed, American lotus, spatterdock, rushes, water hyacinth, water lettuce, and hydrilla. The water hyacinth, lettuce and hydrilla are invasive species that have caused problems previously, although nowadays the issues are minimal.

== Recreational uses ==
Although there are no public parks on the shore of Lake Gonzales, a public access boat ramp is accessible from U.S. Highway 90A.
