= Texas State Highway 304 =

State highway in Texas

State Highway 304
- SH 304, highlighted in red

Route information
- Maintained by TxDOT
- Length: 42.935 mi (69.097 km)
- Existed: 1938–present

Major junctions
- South end: SH 97 northeast of Gonzales
- I-10 near Harwood; US 90 near Harwood
- North end: SH 21 / SH 71 in Bastrop

Location
- Country: United States
- State: Texas

Highway system
- Highways in Texas; Interstate; US; State; Former; Toll; Loops; Spurs; FM/RM; Park; Rec
← SH 303	→ SH 305

State Highway 304 (SH 304) is a Texas state highway that runs in a north–south direction between Bastrop and Gonzales, Texas, United States. The highway's current route was in place by 1938.

== Route description ==
SH 304 begins at a junction with SH 97. It heads north from this junction to an intersection with I-10. The highway continues to the north to an intersection with US 90. Heading towards the north, the highway continues to an intersection FM 713. The highway continues to the northeast to an intersection with FM 535. It continues to the north to a junction with FM 2571. SH 304 reaches its northern terminus at SH 21 and SH 71 in Bastrop.

== History ==
SH 304 was designated on December 1, 1938 along its current route. The number was not assigned until January 23, 1939. On March 29, 1957 SH 304 was proposed along new construction from its end back then to FM 1319, and FM 1319 from FM 535 to SH 71 was cancelled and combined with SH 304.

== Notable landmarks ==
The fictional Gulf Oil gas station/barbecue joint seen in the 1974 cult classic horror movie, The Texas Chain Saw Massacre, is located on the highway south of Bastrop at 1073 SH 304, Bastrop, TX 78602. In the movie, the establishment remains nameless but is donned with a "Coca-Cola/We Slaughter Barbecue" sign.

Today, the dilapidated grocery store (and former gas station ‒ its two gas pumps as seen in the movie having since been removed) has been re-opened as an attraction for Texas Chainsaw Massacre fans with memorabilia from the movie, a barbecue restaurant, appropriately named "We Slaughter Barbecue, and cabins. Before its current owner re-opened, it was known as Bilbo's Texas Landmark and before that as Ryan's Hills Prairie Grocery. The location has now been restored and turned into a horror resort with a Texas BBQ restaurant, music/movie venue and cabins. The ownership team is Roy Rose an Ohio entrepreneur an avid Texas chainsaw massacre fan and Ari Lehman the first Jason in the Friday the thirteenth franchise.

== Junction list ==
County	Location	mi	km	Destinations	Notes
Gonzales				SH 97	
Gonzales				I-10	
Gonzales				US 90	
Caldwell				FM 713	
Bastrop				FM 535	
Bastrop				FM 2571	
Bastrop	Bastrop			SH 21 / SH 71	
1.000 mi = 1.609 km; 1.000 km = 0.621 mi
