= Wrightsboro =

Wrightsboro is the name of several towns in the United States, including:

- Wrightsboro, Georgia
- Wrightsboro, North Carolina
- Wrightsboro, Texas
