= Oak Forest, Texas =

Settlement in Texas, US

Coordinates: 29°29′55.2″N 97°35′05.5″W

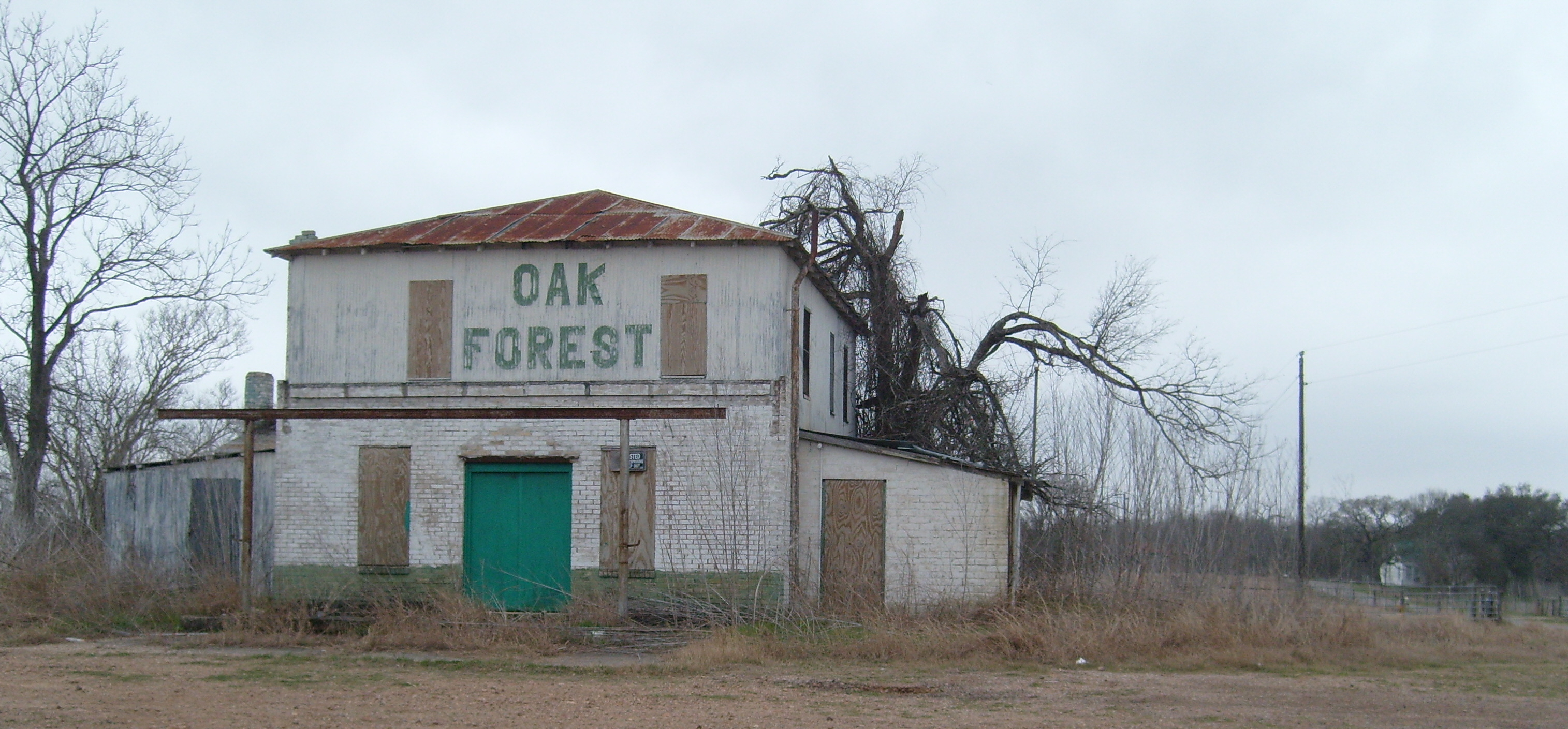
The old Quinton General Store at Oak Forest, Texas

Oak Forest was a settlement in Gonzales County, Texas, United States, five miles west of Gonzales. Oak Forest was situated along modern U.S. Highway 90 Alternate and CR 143, adjacent to the Guadalupe River and due south of the modern Palmetto State Park. Formerly the location of a mill and later re-purposed as a power dam, it failed in 1935 during a flood and was later rebuilt. There is still an operating hydroelectric dam and a small reservoir called MA Wade Dam near the site. According to the Handbook of Texas, the community had an estimated population 25 in 2000.
