= Percy Jones (baseball) =

American baseball player (1899–1979)

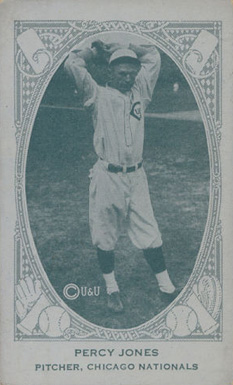
- Pitcher
- Born: October 28, 1899; Harwood, Texas, U.S.
- Died: March 18, 1979 (aged 79); Dallas, Texas, U.S.
- Batted: Right Threw: Left

MLB debut
- August 6, 1920, for the Chicago Cubs

Last MLB appearance
- June 11, 1930, for the Pittsburgh Pirates

MLB statistics
- Win–loss record: 53–57
- Earned run average: 4.34
- Strikeouts: 381
- Stats at Baseball Reference

Teams
- Chicago Cubs (1920–1922, 1925–1928); Boston Braves (1929); Pittsburgh Pirates (1930)

Percy Lee Jones (October 28, 1899 – March 18, 1979) born in Harwood, Texas, was a pitcher for the Chicago Cubs (1920–22 and 1925–28), Boston Braves (1929), and Pittsburgh Pirates (1930).

In 9 seasons he had a win–loss record of 53–57, 251 games, 113 games started, 49 complete games, 8 shutouts, 88 games finished, 6 saves, 1026 innings pitched, 1137 hits allowed, 588 runs allowed, 495 earned runs allowed, 53 home runs allowed, 494 walks allowed, 381 strikeouts, 40 hit batsmen, 20 wild pitches, 4619 batters faced, 2 balks, and a 4.34 ERA.

He died in Dallas, Texas, at the age of 79.

== Sources ==
- Career statistics from Baseball Reference
