= Ottine, Texas =

Unincorporated community in Texas, US

Coordinates: 29°35′53″N 97°35′03″W

Ottine is an unincorporated community in Gonzales County, Texas, United States. According to the Handbook of Texas, the community had an estimated population of 90 in 2000. It is home to Palmetto State Park, which can accommodate approximately 500 daily campers.

The mapped record of its area from 1856 indicates Ottine originally began as a former "Beaumont, Gonzales County, Texas" on the San Marcos River, northeast of what is now known-as Belmont, Texas on the Guadalupe River.

Ottine is home to an urban legend surrounding a bigfoot-like humanoid "swamp thing".

Ottine was also once home to an independent school district known as Ottine-Gonzales Independent School District founded around 1933 and in 1939 during the Second World War the Ottine-Luling Independent School District but the 2 districts didn’t work well now Ottine depends on both Luling and Gonzales’s Education
