= Pilgrim, Texas =

Place in Texas, US

Coordinates: 29°17′36″N 97°31′19″W

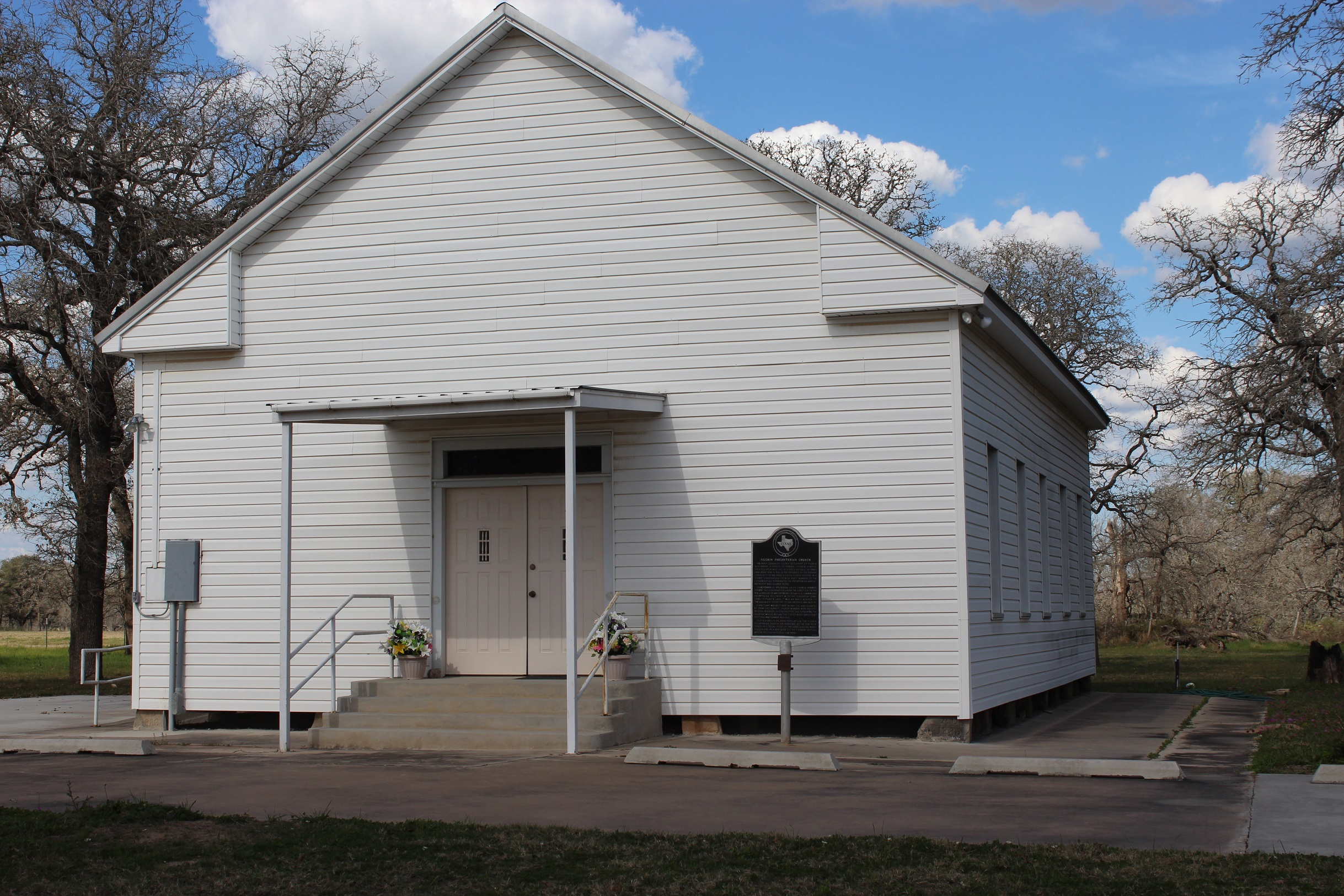
Pilgrim Presbyterian Church

Pilgrim is an unincorporated community located in Gonzales County, Texas, United States. The community has an approximate population of sixty. Pilgrim is situated on land granted to Thomas J. Pilgrim by Stephen F. Austin. Pilgrim is located near a salt flat, and was a notable hideout for John Wesley Hardin in the 1870s. A map shows Pilgrim is located on Farm to Market Road 1116.

== History ==
In 1838, Thomas J. Pilgrim received the Republic of Texas' land grant in Gonzales County, Texas. This land includes a lake and a settlement called "Pilgrim." In addition, there were three schools that were part of the Pilgrim Creek School District in the 1880s: 1) Burnett School (established in 1875 and named from another family which had come to the area); Salt Creek School (established in 1878, named for the salt flats in the area); and Lake Grove, (a school then only for blacks established in 1883). The Pilgrim Presbyterian Church and the Pilgrim Cemetery were also named in honor of Thomas J. Pilgrim. A Recorded Texas Historic Landmark was placed on the road attesting to the history of Pilgrim.
