= Smiley, Texas =

- City
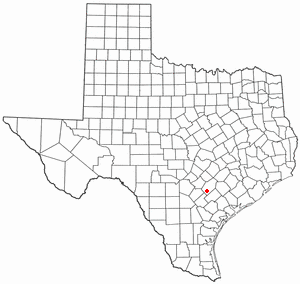
- Location of Smiley, Texas

- Coordinates: 29°16′17″N 97°38′15″W
- Country: United States
- State: Texas
- County: Gonzales

Area
  - Total: 0.52 sq mi (1.35 km^{2})
  - Land: 0.52 sq mi (1.35 km^{2})
  - Water: 0 sq mi (0.00 km^{2})
- Elevation: 312 ft (95 m)

Population (2020)
  - Total: 475
  - Density: 1,093.9/sq mi (422.34/km^{2})
- Time zone: UTC-6 (Central (CST))
  - Summer (DST): UTC-5 (CDT)
- ZIP code: 78159
- Area code: 830
- FIPS code: 48-68300
- GNIS feature ID: 2411910
- Website: smiley.texas.gov

Smiley is a city in Gonzales County, Texas, United States. Its population was 475 at the 2020 census, down from 549 at the 2010 census. Smiley was established in the early 1870s, when trader and sheepherder John Smiley settled by a long, narrow lake that became known as Smiley's, Smileys, or Smiley Lake.

The city is served by the Nixon-Smiley Consolidated Independent School District.

== Geography ==
Smiley is located in southern Gonzales County. U.S. Route 87 passes through the center of town, leading west 8 miles (13 km) to Nixon and southeast 11 mi (18 km) to Westhoff. Gonzales, the county seat, is 21 mi (34 km) to the northeast, and San Antonio is 60 mi (97 km) to the west.

According to the United States Census Bureau, Smiley has a total area of 0.50 sq mi (1.3 km^{2}), all land.

== Demographics ==
Historical population
Census	Pop.	Note	%±
1950	503		—
1960	455		−9.5%
1970	440		−3.3%
1980	505		14.8%
1990	463		−8.3%
2000	453		−2.2%
2010	549		21.2%
2020	475		−13.5%
U.S. Decennial Census

=== 2020 census ===
As of the 2020 census, Smiley had a population of 475. The median age was 37.8 years; 26.3% of residents were under 18 and 21.1% were 65 or older. For every 100 females, there were 87.7 males, and for every 100 females 18 and over, there were 87.2 males 18 and over.

Of the 176 households in Smiley, 42.6% had children under 18 living in them, 40.9% were married-couple households, 15.3% were households with a male householder and no spouse or partner present, and 35.2% were households with a female householder and no spouse or partner present. About 27.3% of all households were made up of individuals, and 18.8% had someone living alone who was 65 or older.

Of the 207 housing units, 15.0% were vacant. The homeowner vacancy rate was 2.5% and the rental vacancy rate was 9.0%.

None of the residents lived in urban areas, while all lived in rural areas.

Racial composition as of the 2020 census
Race	Number	Percent
White	286	60.2%
Black or African American	4	0.8%
American Indian and Alaska Native	1	0.2%
Asian	1	0.2%
Native Hawaiian and other Pacific Islander	2	0.4%
Some other race	90	18.9%
Two or more races	91	19.2%
Hispanic or Latino (of any race)	331	69.7%

=== 2000 census ===
As of the 2000 census, 453 people, 178 households, and 126 families were residing in the city. The population density was 869.8 inhabitants per square mile (335.8/km^{2}). The 202 housing units had an average density of 387.9 per square mile (149.8/km^{2}). The racial makeup of the city was 75.06% White, 0.66% Native American, 20.75% from other races, and 3.53% from two or more races. Hispanics or Latinos of any race were 61.59% of the population.

Of the 178 households, 36.0% had children under 18 living with them, 50.6% were married couples living together, 14.6% had a female householder with no husband present, and 29.2% were not families. About 28.1% of all households were made up of individuals, and 20.8% had someone living alone who was 65 or older. The average household size was 2.54 and the average family size was 3.08.

In the city, the age distribution was 28.7% under 18, 9.3% from 18 to 24, 22.3% from 25 to 44, 15.7% from 45 to 64, and 24.1% who were 65 or older. The median age was 37 years. For every 100 females, there were 105.9 males. For every 100 females age 18 and over, there were 95.8 males.

The median income for a household in the city was $21,591 and for a family was $25,000. Males had a median income of $27,500 versus $15,500 for females. The per capita income for the city was $11,823. About 19.0% of families and 27.0% of the population were below the poverty line, including 37.3% of those under 18 and 20.4% of those 65 or over.
