= Ecleto, Texas =

Unincorporated community in Texas, US

Coordinates: 29°02′47″N 97°45′05″W

Ecleto is an unincorporated community in Karnes County, Texas, United States. It is located along FM 627, approximately six miles southeast of Gillett. According to the Handbook of Texas, the community had an estimated population of 22 in 2000.
