= Bebe, Texas =

Unincorporated community in the United States

- unincorporated community
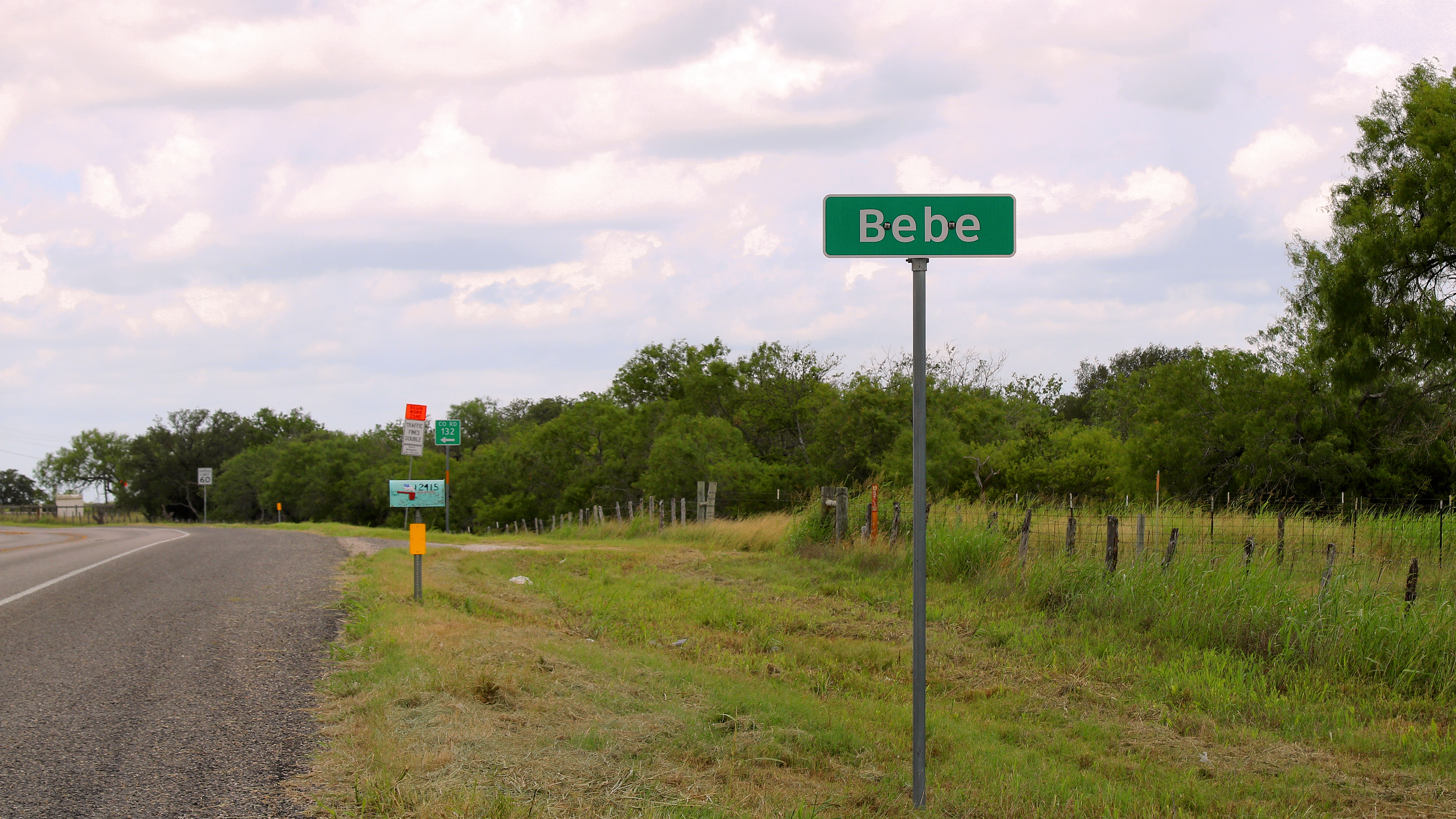
- Bebe road sign
- Interactive map of Bebe, Texas
- Coordinates: 29°24′55″N 97°38′14″W
- Country: United States
- State: Texas
- County: Gonzales
- Post office opened: 1900
- Post office closed: 2002

Population (2000)
  - Total: 52

Bebe is an unincorporated community in Gonzales County, Texas, United States.

According to the Handbook of Texas, the community proper had an estimated population of 52 in 2000; however, its rural environs are rated at 1,240 residents.

It formerly had a set of local schools and other services in the early 20th-century.

== Services ==
As of 2020, by way of federal funding through a "General Land Office grant," a Bebe water facility will be supplemented by an emergency generator. It will allow water to be supplied in the area without immediate power, in cases of an outage. Originally, the generator was intended to be constructed eastward in Wrightsboro but was moved to Bebe. It will serve 1,240 residents in the general area.

=== History ===
A post office called Bebe was established in 1900, and remained in operation until 2002. The community was named after the brand-name Beebee baking powder.

Notable economic activity is indicated to have existed in Bebe as late as 1985; photographic documentation and interview detailed a citizen at a local convenience store, who claimed to hold keys to “every gate and door in the area.”
