= Nixon-Smiley Consolidated Independent School District =

School district in Texas, United States

Address
- 800 Rancho Road Nixon, Texas, 78140; United States

District information
- Grades: PK–12
- Schools: 5
- NCES District ID: 4832740

Students and staff
- Students: 1,011 (2023–2024)
- Teachers: 91.78 (on an FTE basis)
- Student–teacher ratio: 11.02:1

Other information
- Website: www.nixonsmiley.net

Nixon-Smiley Consolidated Independent School District is a public school district based in Nixon, Texas (USA). In addition to Nixon, the district also serves the city of Smiley.

Located in Gonzales County, small portions of the district extend into Guadalupe, Karnes and Wilson counties.

The district was formed in 1983 from the consolidation of the Nixon and Smiley districts, with Smiley ISD consolidating into Nixon-Smiley CISD.

== Notable people ==
In 2016, Superintendent Dr. Cathy Lauer (2004–2021) was named Texas Association of School Boards (TASB) Region 13 Superintendent of the Year.

In 2018, a former Nixon city manager and local substitute teacher, Manuel Zepeda, was charged with 11 sexual felonies; Nixon-Smiley students were involved.
