= Palmetto State Park =

State park in Texas, United States

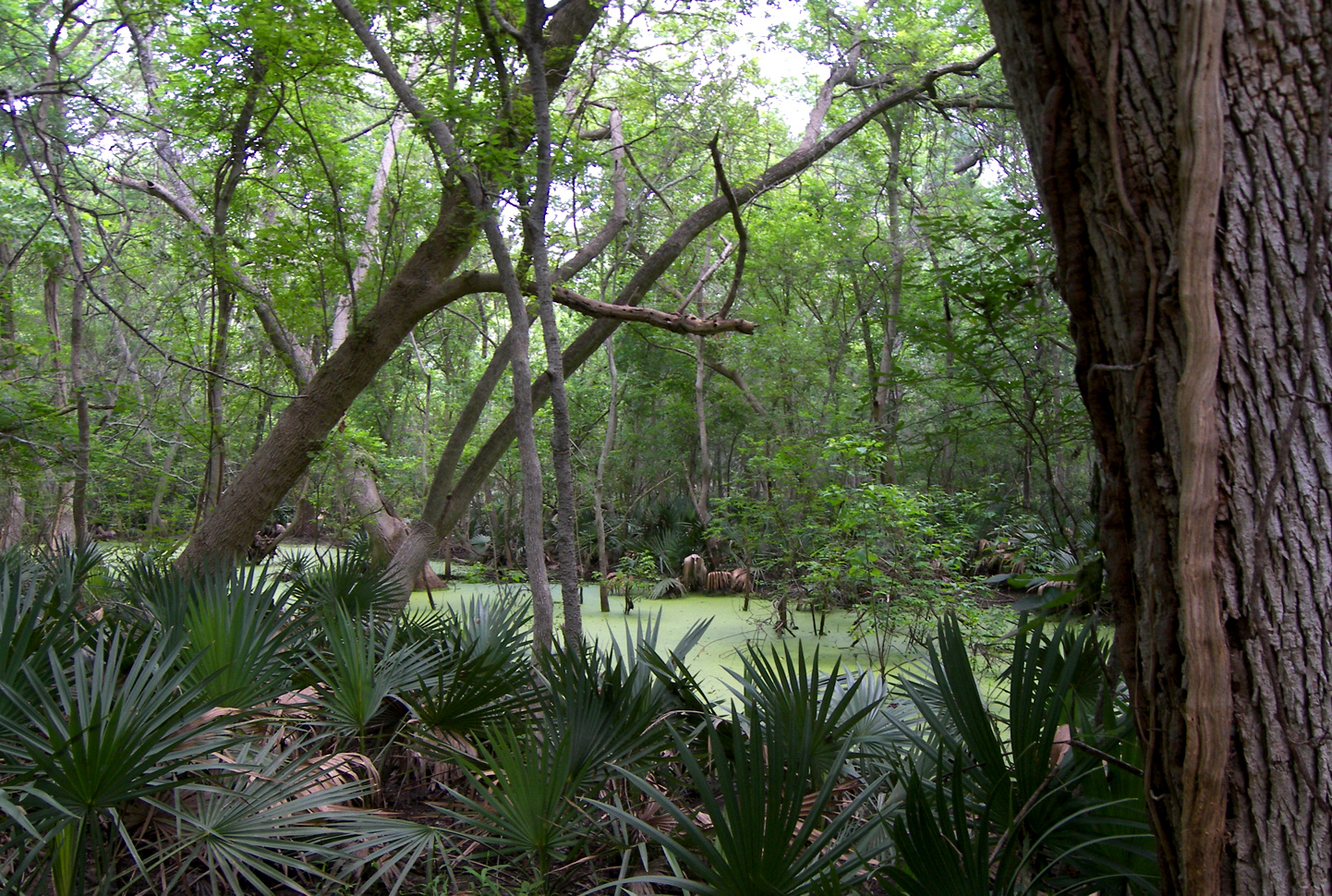
- One of the bogs of the park surrounded by the namesake palmettos.

- Location within Texas Location within the United States
- Location: Gonzales County, Texas
- Nearest city: Luling
- Coordinates: 29°35′14″N 97°34′56″W
- Area: 270.3 acres (109 ha)
- Established: 1936
- Visitors: 95,428 (in 2025)
- Governing body: Texas Parks and Wildlife Department
- Website: Official site

Palmetto State Park is a 270.3 acres (109 ha) state park located in Gonzales County, Texas, United States northwest of Gonzales and southeast of Luling. The park opened in 1936 and is managed by the Texas Parks and Wildlife Department. The park is named for the dwarf palmetto which grows abundantly in the park.

== History ==
The land was acquired by deeds from private owners and the City of Gonzales in 1934–1936. The park was constructed by Civilian Conservation Corps (CCC) Companies 873 and 886 between 1934 and 1937. The CCC built Park Road 11, a low water crossing on the San Marcos River, a water tower/storage building, refectory, and residence (currently the park headquarters), barbeque pits, picnic seating, rock pool and retention dams, rock table, culverts, concrete picnic tables, and two sets of entrance portals.

== Features ==
The San Marcos River runs through the park. The 4-acre (1.6 ha) Oxbow Lake, initially created by flood waters, is now independent of the river and is spring fed. The lake provides a place for swimming, angling, kayaking and paddleboarding. There are many bogs throughout the park that are surrounded by dense vegetation, giving the park a jungle-like atmosphere. Five miles of trails for hiking and biking exist within the park boundaries. There are tent sites, recreational vehicle sites and cabins for overnight stays.

== Nature ==
=== Plants ===
In addition to the dwarf palmetto, live oak, bur oak, honey mesquite, cedar elm, Mexican plum, Texas persimmon, red buckeye, anacua, rattan vine, Texas spiderwort, inland sea oats, trumpet creeper and poison ivy are prevalent in the park.

=== Animals ===
White-tailed deer are common throughout the park, as are common raccoon, Mexican long-nosed armadillo, and eastern fox squirrel. Over 240 species of birds such as the pileated woodpecker, Kentucky warbler and northern cardinal have been recorded within the park's boundaries. Some of the birds often spotted include the prothonotary warbler and red-shouldered hawk.

== See also ==
- List of Texas state parks
