= Harwood, Texas =

Ghost town in Texas, US

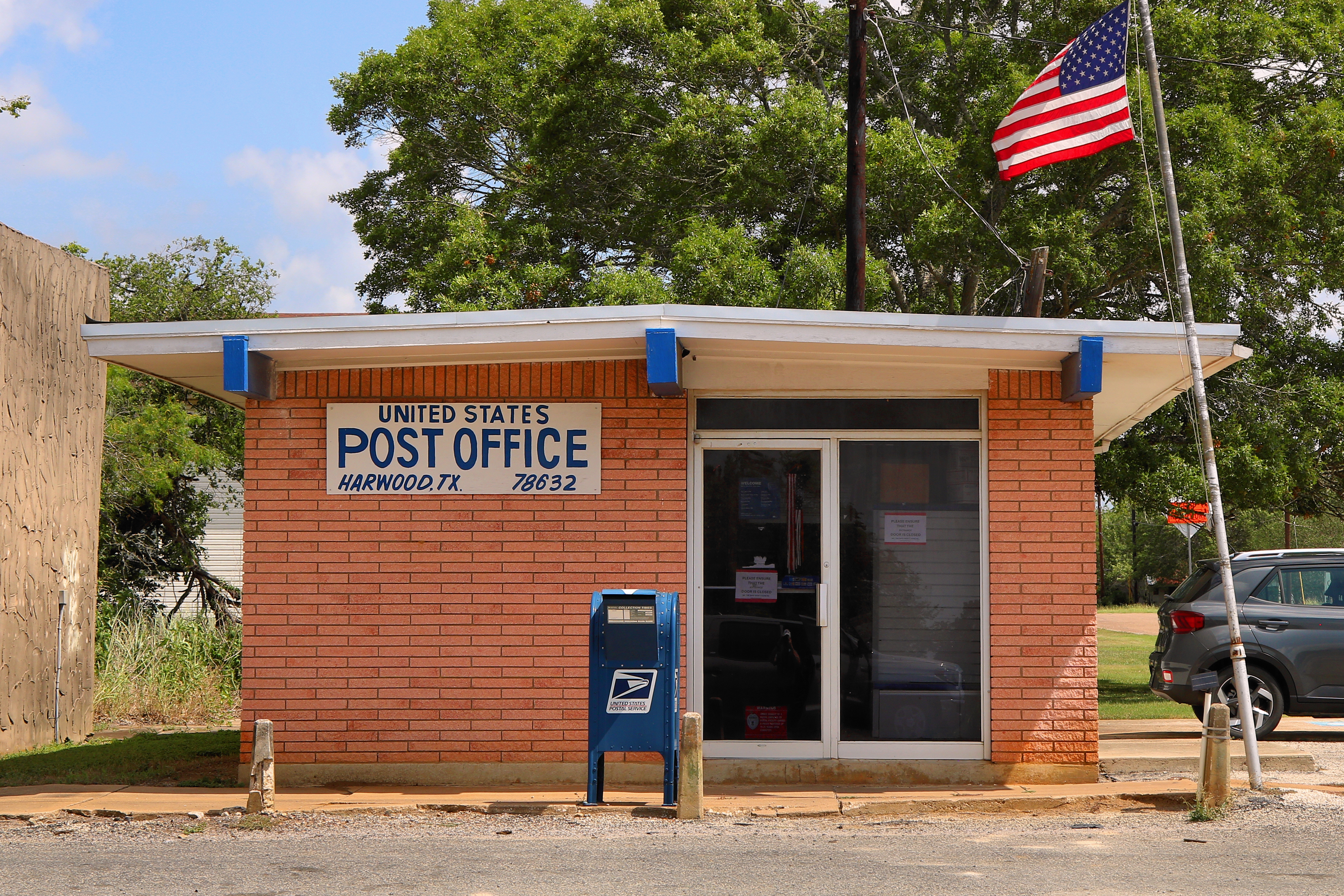
The United States Post Office in Harwood.

Harwood is an unincorporated community in Gonzales County, Texas, United States. According to the Handbook of Texas, the community had an estimated population of 112 in 2000. Harwood has a post office with the ZIP code 78632.

== Geography ==
Harwood is located at 29°39′57″N 97°30′19″W (29.6657863, −97.5052724). It is situated along U.S. Highway 90 in northern Gonzales County, approximately one mile north of Interstate 10. The nearest major city is San Antonio, located 60 miles to the west.

== History ==
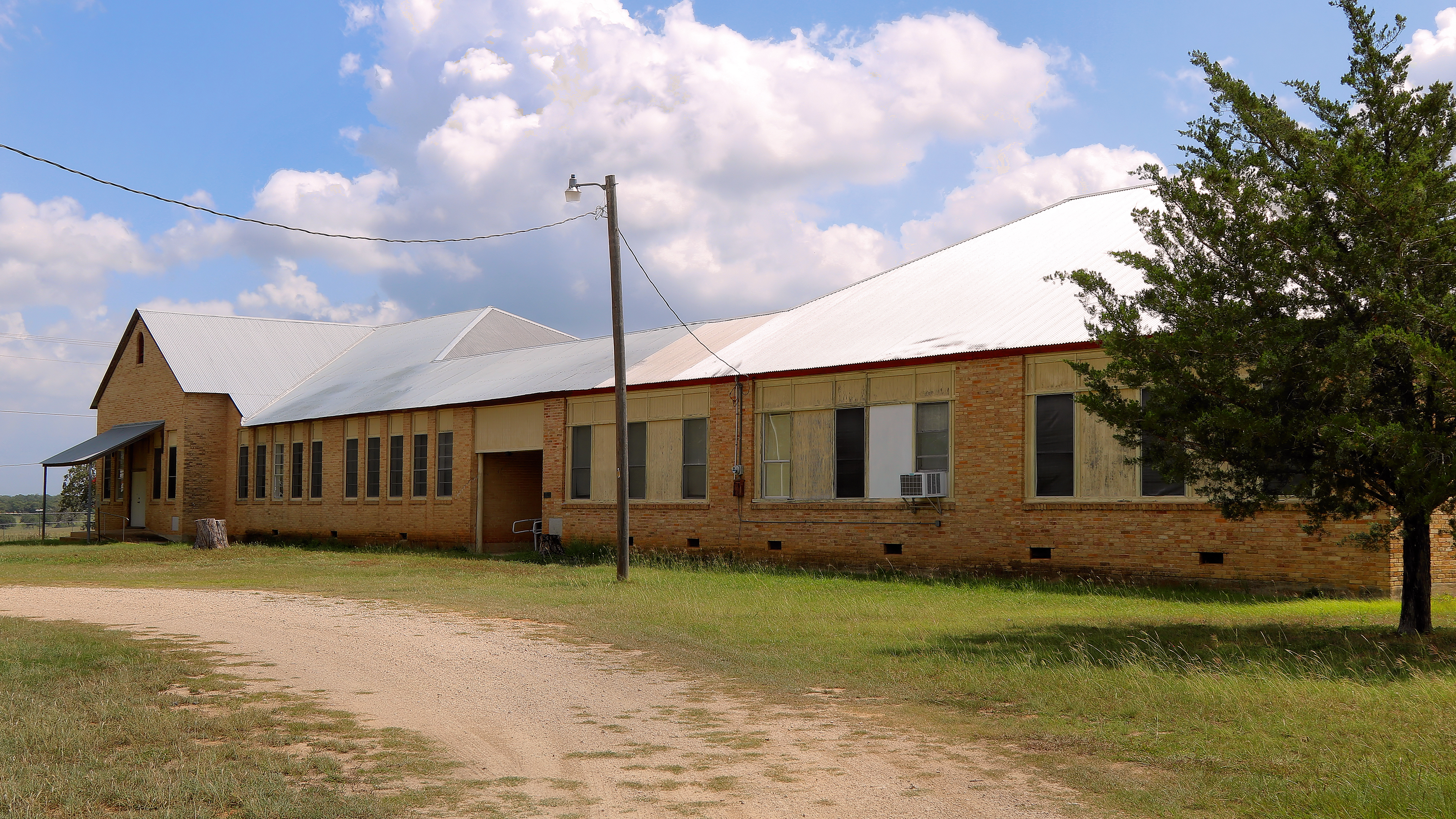
Harwood Community Center

The community was founded in 1874 during the westward expansion of the Galveston, Harrisburg and San Antonio Railway. It was named after Thomas Moore Harwood, a lawyer from nearby Gonzales. At the time of its founding, a community known as Mule Creek was located one mile west of Harwood. A post office operated in Mule Creek from 1872 to 1874, when Harwood was granted a post office. By 1880, Harwood had an estimated population of 155. That figure had grown to 350 by the early 1890s. To prevent the opening of a saloon that was opposed by most local residents, Harwood was incorporated in 1913. The population was 200 at the 1920 census. After rising to 225 in 1930, Harwood slowly declined. Cotton production, which had been a major element of the local economy, decreased during the 1940s. The number of residents living in Harwood fell to 157 in 1950, 132 in 1960, and 112 in 1970. The town disincorporated during the 1970s. By 1990, Harwood had one large farm and ranch supply store, several businesses, and a community center with a collection of local memorabilia. Throughout the latter half of the twentieth century and into 2000, Harwood was home to approximately 112 residents.

== Education ==
Public education in the community of Harwood is provided by the Gonzales Independent School District.
