= Wrightsboro, Texas =

Unincorporated community in Texas, US

Wrightsboro is an unincorporated community in Gonzales County, Texas, United States. According to the Handbook of Texas, the community had an estimated population of 76 in 2000.

Wrightsboro is located at 29°22′26″N 97°33′54″W. It is situated along FM 108 in southwestern Gonzales County, approximately twelve miles southwest of Gonzales.

Wrightsboro has a post office, with the zip code of 78677.

Public education in the community of Wrightsboro is provided by the Gonzales Independent School District.
