= Cost, Texas =

Unincorporated community in Texas, US

Cost is an unincorporated community in Gonzales County, Texas, United States. According to the Handbook of Texas, the community had an estimated population of 62 in 2000.

Cost is located at 29°26′15″N 97°31′34″W. It is situated along State Highway 97 in central Gonzales County, approximately six miles southwest of Gonzales.

The first shot beginning the war of the Texas Revolution was fired a mile east of Cost on October 2, 1835.

Cost has a post office, with the zip code of 78614.

Public education in the community of Cost is provided by the Gonzales Independent School District.

== See also ==
- Battle of Gonzales
