= Belmont, Texas =

Unincorporated area in Gonzales County, Texas

Belmont
- Unincorporated Area
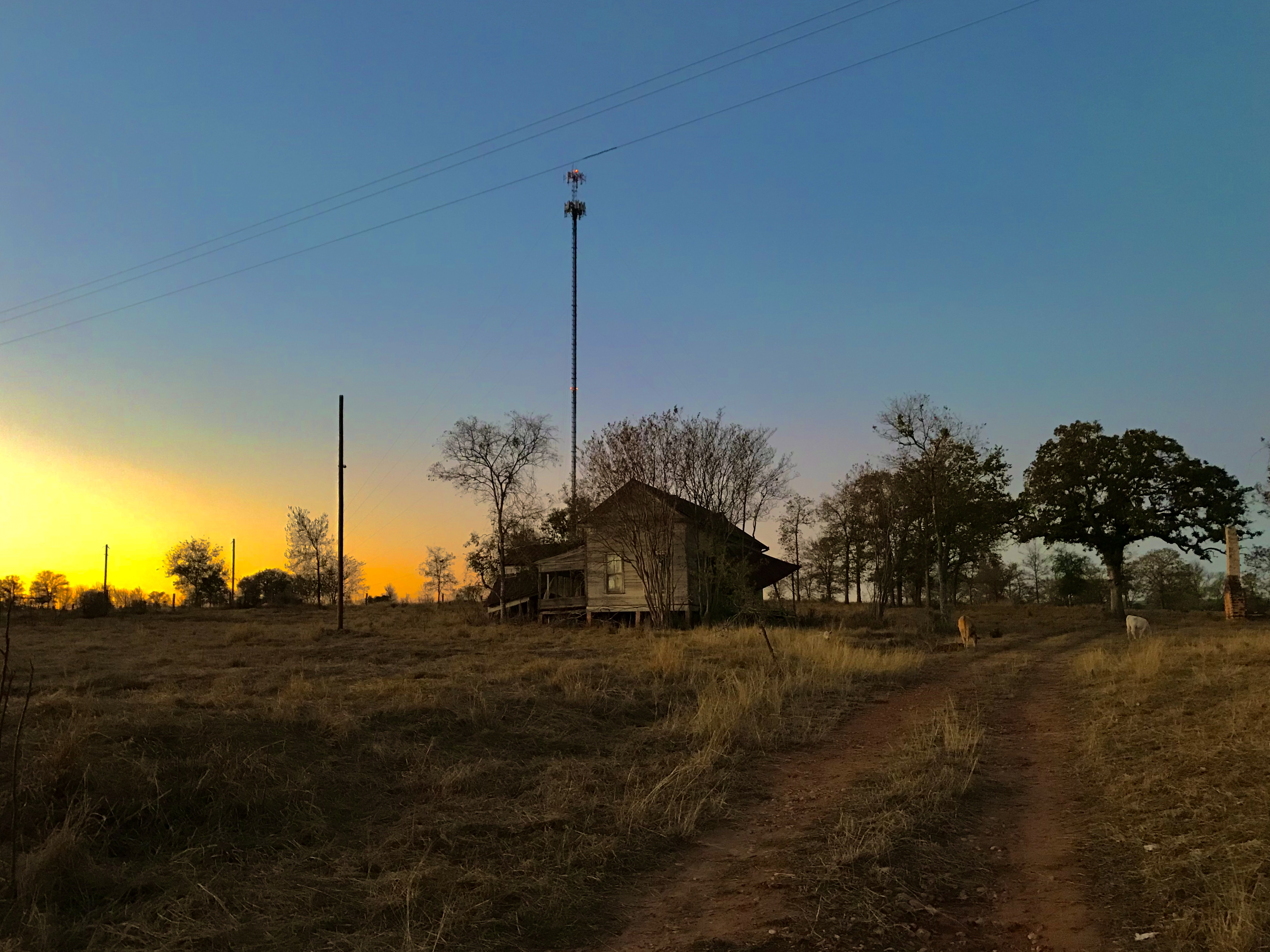
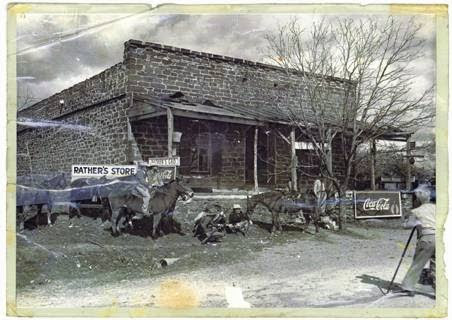
- Above: Primary cell site, downtown Belmont; Below: Belmont ca. 1940
- Nicknames: "Beaumont," "Centerville"
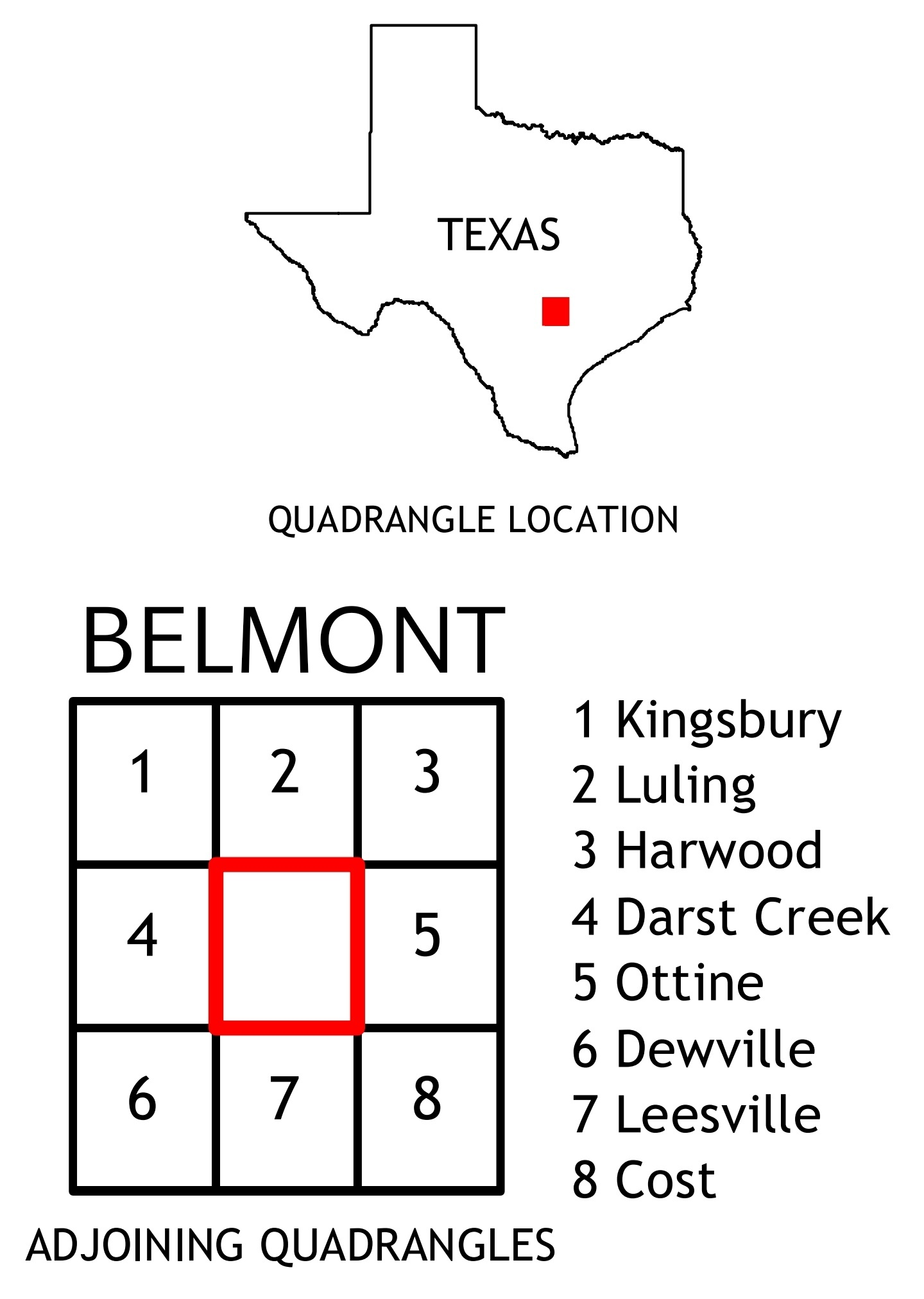
- Belmont is south of Kingsbury-Luling
- Subregion: East Central Texas
- Region: Texas Triangle
- Settled: 1825–1836, DeWitt Colony (Eliza DeWitt Tract)
- Founded: As late as c.1850
- Recognized: c.1893 (state law)
- Precinct: Electoral Precinct 5

Government
  - Type: Unincorporated; emergency services managed by County Sheriff

Area
  - Total: 40 sq mi (100 km^{2})

Population (2016)
  - Total: 36
  - Density: 0.90/sq mi (0.35/km^{2})
  - Traffic: 13,197 vehicles (AADT)
  - Traffic density: 329.9/sq mi (127.4/km^{2})
  - Rural environs: 1,169
- Time zone: UTC-6 (CST)
  - Summer (DST): UTC-5
- GNIS feature ID: 1330391
- Location: South of Austin–San Marcos areas North of Leesville, Texas
- Website: Belmont VFD

Belmont, officially known as the "Belmont Site," is an unincorporated area of approximately 40 square miles in extreme western Gonzales County, Texas, United States, adjacent to Greater Austin, north of the "Belmont intersection" at the "Leesville Quad" water-testing site (FM 466), electorally known as local Precinct 5. The population of Belmont-proper has been rated at 36 employees, with the greater area rated at 1,169 residents. The area is defined by the limits of the northern and western county line, bordered by the significant 1800s land grants of Eliza Dewitt, Ira Nash, Samuel Robbins and Thomas Decrew. It is served by the Belmont Volunteer Fire Department.

== Services ==
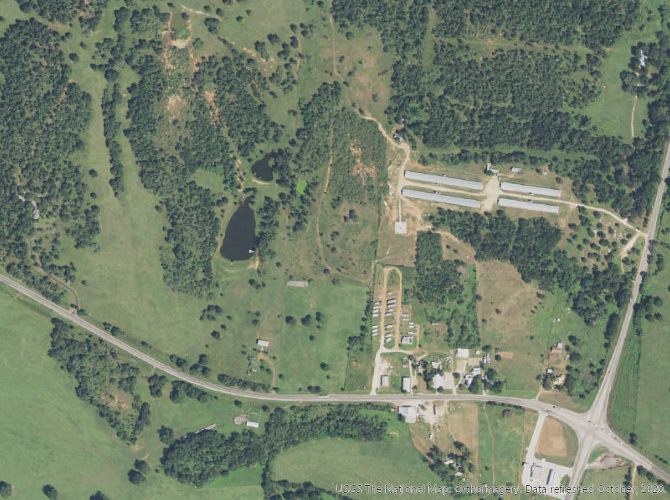
Belmont, Texas proper

In 2016, Belmont had one construction operation, one wholesale trade operation, two retail trade services, one finance-and-insurance service and one accommodation-and-food service. All sectors reported 36 paid employees during this time, with a first-quarter payroll aggregating to $209,000 and total annual payroll of $816,000. In 2018, business owners alone in the Belmont-Harwood-Ottine area, were rated at an aggregate income of $8,953,800 (±5,206,167); the aggregate household income for the area was rated at $74,699,400 (±10,759,689). The Gonzales County Sheriff's Office controls the emergency and municipal radio-communications of the local area, and manages its proposed future 300-ft radio tower.

The area directly connects to the county seats of Seguin and Gonzales through Capote Road (FM 466), as well as served by the bridges and infrastructure of the nearby Guadalupe River. North of its Lake Gonzales, it is bordered to the east by the disconnected railway towns of "Saint James" and "Smithville," alongside the western boundary of FM 2091 in Ottine. In 2019 according to the Texas Department of Transportation, the aggregate annual-average-daily-traffic (AADT) of Belmont state highways was rated at 13,197 vehicles.

== History ==
Initial public record of 1893 shows Belmont's place in Gonzales County as an area of households significantly supported by African-American labor, and gun fighting within classical family feuds. The river south of it was used as a household laundry. Further, Belmont shares a part of the history of the Old West as it's featured in The Ballad of Gregorio Cortez, and in the realities of the manhunt of Gregorio Cortez in the historical Battle of Belmont. The general area has been associated with the industry of horsebreeding.

=== Name ===
The original mapped record of its area from 1856 indicates "Belmont" began as a "Beaumont, Gonzales County, Texas" on the San Marcos River, northeast of its present-site on the Guadalupe River, still east of Nash Creek on the Guadalupe County line. This is an apparent collision with the present-day Beaumont, Texas in southeast Texas, with "Beaumont" since replaced or corrupted with "Belmont" on contemporary record.

The Guadalupe River site (U.S. Highway 90A), upon its northern bank, was originally founded as "Centerville, Gonzales County" in the 1840s and eventually came to take on the present Belmont name, in order to receive postal service; like Beaumont, Texas - Centerville, Texas was a colliding, duplicate name as well.

Dubiously and falsely, given the Belmont Stakes began in 1867, far after Belmont's founding, the area is claimed to have been named after horse racing.

=== DeWitt Colony ===
The Belmont area was originally settled by Eliza DeWitt after January 1830, when she eventually received a DeWitt Colony land grant in April 1831; she had moved from St. Louis County, Missouri. She was later widowed twice, with one of her husbands killed by Native Americans. Her third marriage was in Houston. Her original DeWitt Colony land grant is the oldest established tract completely within Belmont, preceding the Texan Revolution.

Most of Belmont's urban facilities share the Ira Nash tract, a DeWitt colonial-tract, with rural Kingsbury in the northwest.

=== Old Billy horsebreeding ===
Born in Lumpkin County, Georgia, in 1830, William B. Fleming came to Texas before 1850 where he enlisted in Company C of the Texas Rangers Mounted Volunteers and later the Confederate Army during the Civil War. After the war, Fleming moved to Gonzales County. In partnership with Charles Erasmus Littlefield in 1871, Fleming purchased land on the Guadalupe River south bank in Belmont. Fleming erected a dog run-style cabin of black walnut logs where remnants can still be found.

Fleming purchased his first horse known as "Old Billy" and used him to breed a line of quarter horses known as "Billys". Cowboy, rodeo performers and racing enthusiasts coveted Billy horses and Fleming was one of the premier horse breeders of his day.

=== Belmont—Old Nixon ===
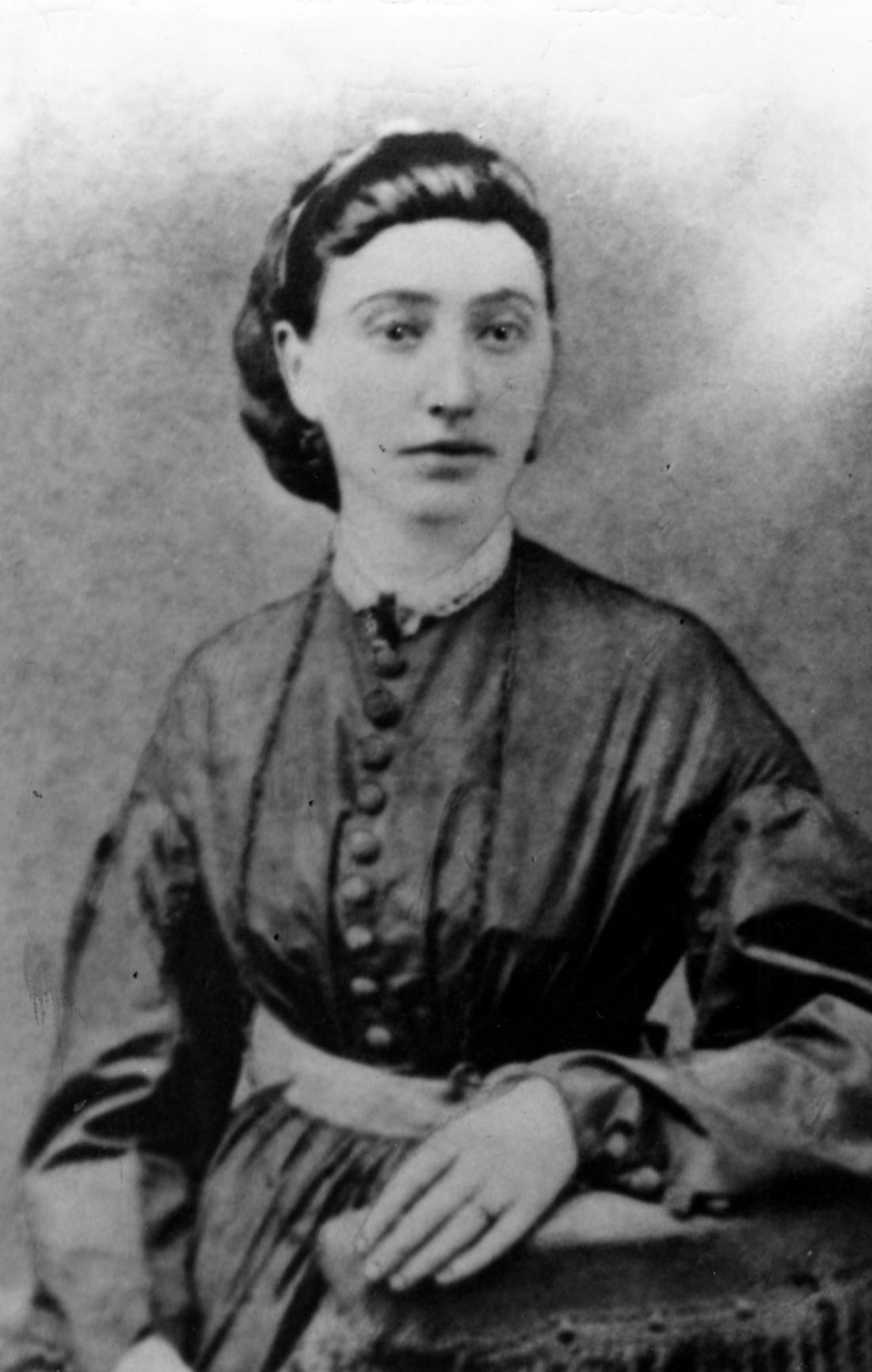
Fannie Andrews Nixon, wife of Old Nixon, Texas founder, Robert Thomas Nixon (1879); one of the first schoolteachers of the area

In 1852, Robert T. Nixon at the northern Gonzales—Guadalupe County line founded the original settlement of Nixon, now known as the ghost town "Old Nixon;" a former 14,000 acre plantation between Belmont-Luling.

The Old Nixon facility, despite being fenced at 14,000 acres at its precipice, began at an original capitalization of $800 for 400 acres of land; with no original "free land" grants of early Texas. During Juneteenth 1865, the plantation was not affected by the abolishment of slavery, as the plantation had no slaves. Cattle and horse-breeding were the primary occupations of this enterprise, the latter being featured in The Quarter Horse journal of July 1947; featuring the early 1900s, when the Old Nixon plantation under Dr. J.W. Nixon, hosted the first "Joe Bailey" Quarter Horse, a foremost founding sire of the breed.

In 1899, Old Nixon at Guadalupe County had a cotton gin (Nixon-family owned), two schools, a church, a blacksmith, several residences; alongside "Wagner's Store" and "Nixon and Stephens: Dealers in Dry Goods, Notions, Fine Groceries and General Merchandise." The latter was owned by W.H. Stephens and Sam Nixon. Robert T. Nixon's brother John T. Nixon lived at Rancho near what is now northern Nixon in southern Gonzales County. The name of Nixon was later taken from the former town and applied to the new town formed on John T. Nixon's land.

The only remaining establishment of the original Old Nixon settlement is its cemetery.

=== Notable person ===
- Martin Beaty, United States Representative from Kentucky

=== Former settlements ===
Saint James is a former settlement, of frontier railway town legacy, that defines the northeastern boundary of the Belmont area; it is located on Gonzales County Road 260 intersecting with FM 2091. Its southern counterpart Smithville is found at Gonzales County Road 257 and U.S. Route 90 Alternate.

== See also ==
- Monthalia, Texas
