= Gillett, Texas =

Unincorporated community in Texas, US

Coordinates: 29°07′42″N 97°47′06″W

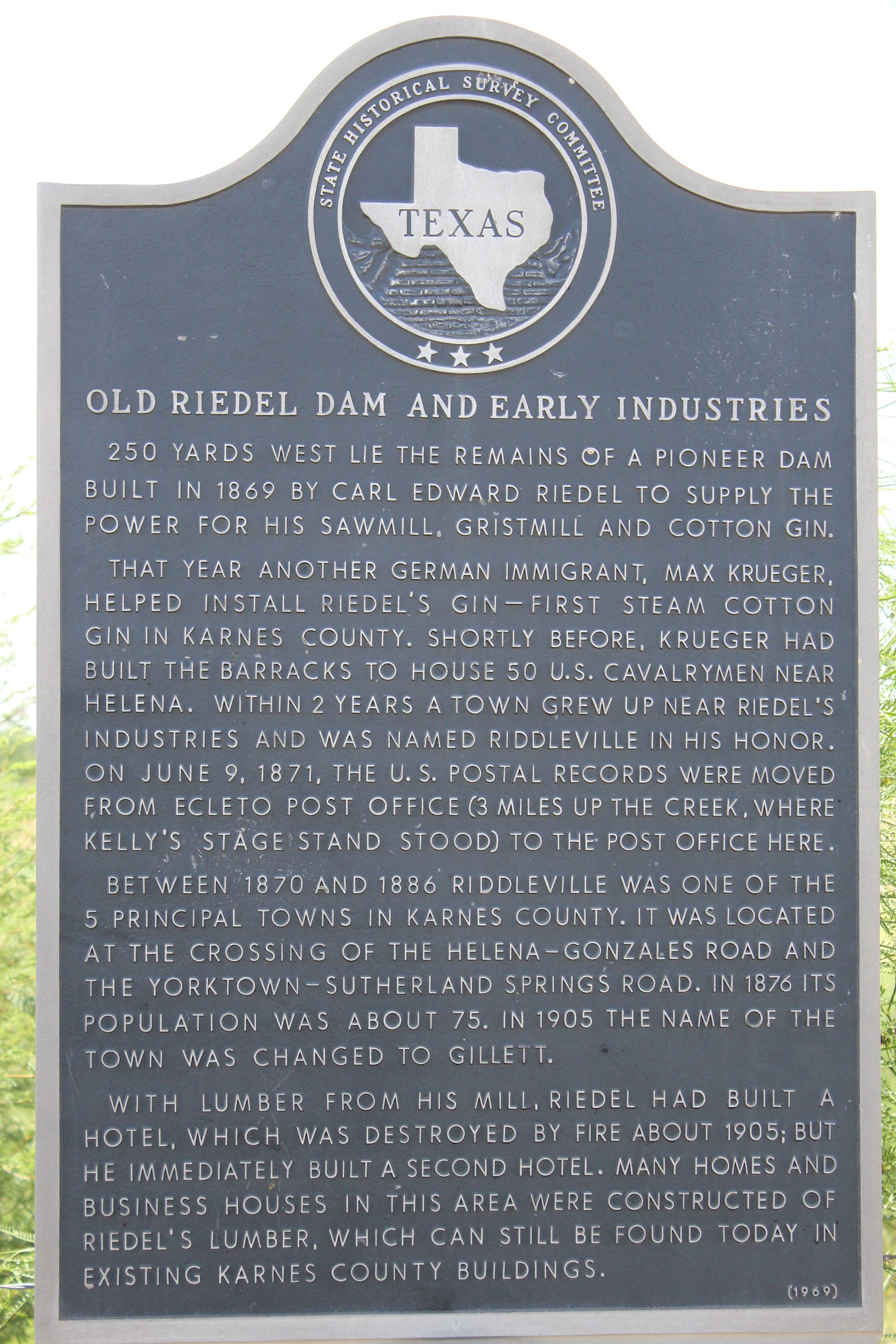
Texas historic marker for Old Riedel Dam in Gillett, Texas

Gillett (/dʒɪˈlɛt/ ji-LET) is an unincorporated community in Karnes County, Texas, United States. According to the Handbook of Texas, the community had an estimated population of 120 in 2000.

Gillett has a post office with the ZIP code 78116. Public education in the community is provided by the Karnes City Independent School District.
