= Gonzales Independent School District =

School district in Texas, United States

Address
- 1615 St. Louis Street Gonzales, Texas, 78629; United States

District information
- Grades: PK–12
- Schools: 5
- NCES District ID: 4821060

Students and staff
- Students: 2,541 (2023–2024)
- Teachers: 177.44 (on an FTE basis)
- Student–teacher ratio: 14.32:1

Other information
- Website: www.gonzalesisd.net

Gonzales Independent School District is a public school district based in Gonzales, Texas (USA).

Located in Gonzales County, a small portion of the district extends into Caldwell County.

The school district was recently engaged in a scandal over the use of prison jumpsuits as a way to combat violators of their dress codes. Opponents cited possible violations of the first amendment and it was rumored that the ACLU was involved.

In 2009, the school district was rated "academically acceptable" by the Texas Education Agency.

In 2021 the district realigned its grades.

== Schools ==
- Gonzales High School (Grades 9-12)
- Gonzales Junior High (Grades 7-8) From fall 2021 it will be grades 6-8.
- North Avenue 6th Grade Center (Grades 6) - From fall 2021 it will be North Avenue Intermediate Campus, grades 3-5.
- Gonzales Elementary (Grades 3-5) - From fall 2021 it will be grades K-2.
- East Avenue Primary (Grades 1-2) - From 2021 it will no longer be used for classes and instead will house the district headquarters and offices of curriculum and instruction, special services, and technology.
- Gonzales Primary Academy (Grades PK-K) - From fall 2021 it will be preschool and early childhood special education only.
