= Gonzales County, Texas =

County in Texas, United States

- County
- Location within the U.S. state of Texas
- Coordinates: 29°27′N 97°29′W
- Country: United States
- State: Texas
- Founded: 1837
- Named for: City of Gonzales
- Seat: Gonzales
- Largest city: Gonzales

Area
  - Total: 1,070 sq mi (2,800 km^{2})
  - Land: 1,067 sq mi (2,760 km^{2})
  - Water: 3.2 sq mi (8.3 km^{2}) 0.3%

Population (2020)
  - Total: 19,653
  - Estimate (2025): 20,159 ▲
  - Density: 18.42/sq mi (7.112/km^{2})
- Time zone: UTC−6 (Central)
  - Summer (DST): UTC−5 (CDT)
- Congressional district: 27th
- Website: www.co.gonzales.tx.us

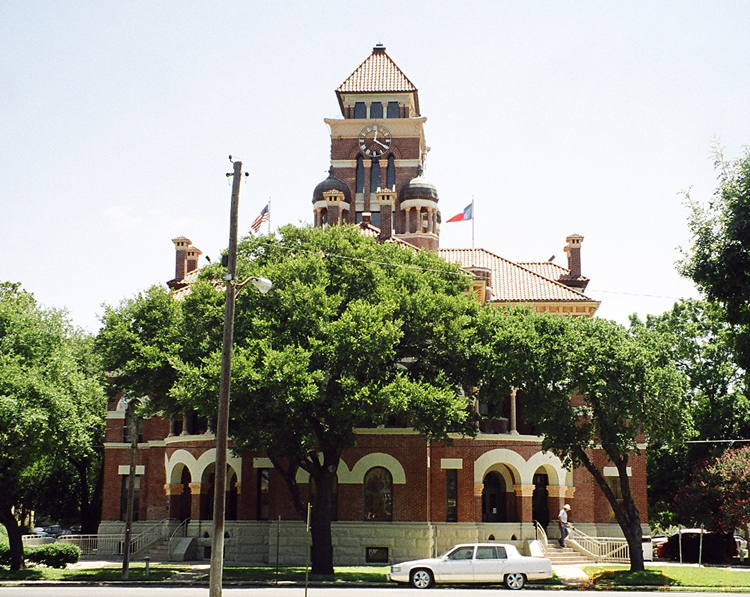
The Gonzales County Courthouse. The Second Empire-style building was added to National Register of Historic Places in 1972.

Gonzales County is a county in the U.S. state of Texas, adjacent to Greater Austin-San Antonio. As of the 2020 census, its population was 19,653. The county is named for its county seat, the city of Gonzales. The county was created in 1836 and organized the following year. As of August 2020, under strict budgetary limitations, the County of Gonzales governmental body is unique in that it claims to have no commercial paper, regarding it as "the absence of any county debt."

According to the census, all areas county-wide had $188,099,000 in total annual payroll (2016), $550,118,900 (±39,442,212; 2018) in aggregate annual income, and $238,574,000 in total annual retail sales (2012). In 2018, the census valued all real estate in the county at an aggregate $795,242,300 (±74,643,103); with an aggregate $29,058,000 of real estate being listed for sale and $173,100 listed for rent. In the same year, approximately, the top 5% of households made an average of $361,318; the top 20% averaged at $188,699; the fourth quintile at $79,601; the third quintile (median income) at $53,317; the second quintile at $31,238; and the lowest at $13,339. The Texas Almanac rated all categories of land in the county at an aggregate value of $5.6-billion.

== History ==
Paleo-Indian hunter-gatherers were here thousands of years ago; the later Coahuiltecan, Tonkawa, and Karankawa migrated into the area in the 14th century, but lost much of their population by the 18th century due to new infectious diseases contracted by contact with European explorers. The historic Comanche and Waco tribes later migrated into the area and competed most with European American settlers of the 19th century.

Between 1519 and 1685, Hernando Cortez and Alonso Álvarez de Pineda claimed Texas for Spain. Beginning in 1685, France planted its flag on Texas soil, but departed after only five years, and Spain regained the territory. Mexico, including Texas, won its independence from Spain in 1821. Citizens of the United States began to settle in Texas and were granted land and Mexican citizenship.

In 1825, Green DeWitt's petition for a land grant to establish a colony in Texas was approved by the Mexican government. Gonzales was established, named for Rafael Gonzales, governor of Coahuila y Tejas. When Jean Louis Berlandier visited in 1828, he found settler cabins, a fort-like barricade, crop agriculture, and livestock, as well as nearby villages of Tonkawa and Karankawa. The Coahuila y Tejas government sent a six-pound cannon to Gonzales in 1831 for settlers' protection against Indian raids.

In 1835, the colony sent delegates to conventions (1832–1835) to discuss disagreements with Mexico. The Mexican government viewed the conventions as treason, so troops were sent to Gonzales in September 1832 to retrieve the cannon. On October 2, the Battle of Gonzales became the first shots fired in the Texas Revolution. The colonists put up armed resistance, with the cannon pointed at the Mexican troops, and above it a banner proclaimed, "Come and Take It". Commemoration of the event became the annual "Come and Take It Festival". From October 13 – December 9, the Siege of Bexar became the first major campaign of the Texas Revolution.

Gonzales County was established in 1836.

February 23 – Alamo messenger Launcelot Smithers carried to the people of Gonzales, the Colonel William Barret Travis letter stating the enemy is in sight and requesting men and provisions.
February 24 – Captain Albert Martin delivered to Smithers in Gonzales the infamous "Victory or Death" Travis letter addressed "To the People of Texas and All Americans in the World" stating the direness of the situation. Smithers then took the letter to San Felipe, site of the provisional Texas government.
February 27 – The Gonzales Alamo relief force of 32 men, led by Lieutenant George C. Kimble, departed to join the 130 fighters already at the Alamo.
March 1 – The Gonzales "Immortal 32" made their way inside the Alamo.
March 2 – Texas Declaration of Independence from Mexico established the Republic of Texas.
March 6 – The Alamo fell.
March 13–14 – Susanna Dickinson, the widow of the Alamo defender Almaron Dickinson, arrived in Gonzales with her daughter Angelina and Colonel Travis' slave Joe. Upon hearing the news of the Alamo, Sam Houston ordered the town of Gonzales torched to the ground, and established his headquarters under an oak tree in the county.

In 1838, Gonzales men founded the town of Walnut Springs (later Seguin) in the northwest section of the county. Two years later, Gonzales men joined the Battle of Plum Creek against Buffalo Hump and his Comanches.

Gonzales College was founded in 1850 by slave-owning planters, and was the first institution in Texas to confer bachelor of arts degrees on women. The Gonzales Inquirer begins publication in 1853. By 1860, the county's population had grown to 8,059, including 3,168 slaves.

County citizens voted 802–80 in favor of secession from the Union in 1861. On February 1, Texas seceded from the Union. On March 2, Texas joined the Confederate States of America.

The Sutton–Taylor feud of 1866–1876, which involved outlaw John Wesley Hardin, was reportedly the bloodiest and longest in Texas' history. Hardin's men were known to have stayed in the community of Pilgrim. On March 30, 1870, the United States Congress readmitted Texas into the Union. The Galveston, Harrisburg and San Antonio Railway was built through the eastern and northern part of the county in 1874; three years later, the Texas and New Orleans Railway came to the county. In 1881, the Gonzales Branch Railroad was chartered. In 1885, the San Antonio and Aransas Pass Railway was built through the county.

John Wesley Hardin is released from prison in 1894, and returned to Gonzales, where he passed the bar examination and started practicing law.

In 1898, 23 county men served, with two casualties, during the Spanish–American War. Three served with the Rough Riders. During World War I, 1,106 men from the county served. for World War II, about 3,000 men from Gonzales County served, with 79 casualties.

In 1935, Governor James V. Allred dedicated a monument in the community of Cost, commemorating the first shot of the Texas Revolution. The sculptor was Waldine A. Tauch.

Palmetto State Park opened to the public in 1936. The Gonzales Warm Springs Foundation opened for the treatment of polio in 1939.

== Geography ==
According to the U.S. Census Bureau, the county has a total area of 1,070 square miles (2,800 km^{2}), of which 3.2 sq mi (8.3 km^{2}) (0.3%) are covered by water.

Directly connected to the US 183 / I-10 / SH 130 corridor, the Gonzales County roads support average annual daily traffic rated at over 100,000 vehicles by the Texas Department of Transportation; due to its direct adjacency to Greater Austin and Greater San Antonio.

=== River crossings ===
Gonzales County and the Texas Department of Transportation provide bridges across the Guadalupe River and the San Marcos River.

- North FM 466 / SH 80 bridge; Belmont, extreme-west Gonzales County
- North FM 466 / Gonzales County Road 143 bridge; Monthalia, west Gonzales County
- North SH 97 / US 183 bridge; City of Gonzales, Texas
- East US 90A / FM 2091 bridge; San Marcos River, Ottine

=== Major highways ===
- I-10
- US 87
- US 90
- US 90 Alt.
- US 183
- SH 80
- SH 97
- SH 304
- Spur 95
- Spur 131
- Spur 146

==== Arteries ====
The majority of the county's arterial roads have had their names removed and replaced by "County Road" numbered designations. Very few major roads remain properly named on record for Gonzales County, especially outside incorporated areas, including:

- Capote Road ( FM 466), Belmont-Leesville to Seguin
- Salt Lake Road (CR 266), North Ottine
- Harwood Road (CR 230), North Harwood to City-of-Gonzales
- Double Live Oak Lane ( FM 1115), North Waelder

=== Adjacent counties ===
- Caldwell County (north)
- Fayette County (northeast)
- Lavaca County (east)
- Dewitt County (south)
- Karnes County (southwest)
- Wilson County (west)
- Guadalupe County (northwest)

== Demographics ==
Historical population
Census	Pop.	Note	%±
1850	1,492		—
1860	8,059		440.1%
1870	8,951		11.1%
1880	14,840		65.8%
1890	18,016		21.4%
1900	28,882		60.3%
1910	28,055		−2.9%
1920	28,438		1.4%
1930	28,337		−0.4%
1940	26,075		−8.0%
1950	21,164		−18.8%
1960	17,845		−15.7%
1970	16,375		−8.2%
1980	16,883		3.1%
1990	17,205		1.9%
2000	18,628		8.3%
2010	19,807		6.3%
2020	19,653		−0.8%
2025 (est.)	20,159	▲	2.6%
U.S. Decennial Census; 1850–2010 2010 2020

=== Racial and ethnic composition ===
Gonzales County, Texas – Racial and ethnic composition Note: the US Census treats Hispanic/Latino as an ethnic category. This table excludes Latinos from the racial categories and assigns them to a separate category. Hispanics/Latinos may be of any race.
Race / Ethnicity (NH = Non-Hispanic)	Pop 1980	Pop 1990	Pop 2000	Pop 2010	Pop 2020	% 1980	% 1990	% 2000	% 2010	% 2020
White alone (NH)	10,044	9,398	9,539	8,836	8,159	59.49%	54.62%	51.21%	44.61%	41.52%
Black or African American alone (NH)	1,950	1,581	1,493	1,353	1,075	11.55%	9.19%	8.01%	6.83%	5.47%
Native American or Alaska Native alone (NH)	13	15	31	41	41	0.08%	0.09%	0.17%	0.21%	0.21%
Asian alone (NH)	12	19	49	73	63	0.07%	0.11%	0.26%	0.37%	0.32%
Native Hawaiian or Pacific Islander alone (NH)	x	x	14	5	6	x	x	0.08%	0.03%	0.03%
Other race alone (NH)	1	50	6	17	45	0.01%	0.29%	0.03%	0.09%	0.23%
Mixed race or Multiracial (NH)	x	x	115	129	367	x	x	0.62%	0.65%	1.87%
Hispanic or Latino (any race)	4,863	6,142	7,381	9,353	9,897	28.80%	35.70%	39.62%	47.22%	50.36%
Total	16,883	17,205	18,628	19,807	19,653	100.00%	100.00%	100.00%	100.00%	100.00%

=== 2020 census ===
As of the 2020 census, the county had a population of 19,653. The median age was 40.1 years. 25.3% of residents were under the age of 18 and 18.9% of residents were 65 years of age or older. For every 100 females there were 99.1 males, and for every 100 females age 18 and over there were 97.3 males age 18 and over.

The racial makeup of the county was 57.7% White, 6.0% Black or African American, 0.8% American Indian and Alaska Native, 0.3% Asian, 0.1% Native Hawaiian and Pacific Islander, 18.5% from some other race, and 16.6% from two or more races. Hispanic or Latino residents of any race comprised 50.4% of the population.

35.4% of residents lived in urban areas, while 64.6% lived in rural areas.

There were 7,275 households in the county, of which 34.0% had children under the age of 18 living in them. Of all households, 48.0% were married-couple households, 19.4% were households with a male householder and no spouse or partner present, and 26.4% were households with a female householder and no spouse or partner present. About 26.4% of all households were made up of individuals and 12.6% had someone living alone who was 65 years of age or older.

There were 8,919 housing units, of which 18.4% were vacant. Among occupied housing units, 68.4% were owner-occupied and 31.6% were renter-occupied. The homeowner vacancy rate was 1.8% and the rental vacancy rate was 11.4%.

=== 2000 census ===
As of the census of 2000, there were 18,628 people, 6,782 households, and 4,876 families residing in the county. The population density was 17 people per square mile (6.6 people/km^{2}). There were 8,194 housing units at an average density of 8 units per square mile (3.1/km^{2}). The racial makeup of the county was 72.25% White, 8.39% Black or African American, 0.53% Native American, 0.26% Asian, 0.09% Pacific Islander, 16.48% from other races, and 2.01% from two or more races. 39.62% of the population were Hispanic or Latino of any race.

There were 6,782 households, out of which 34.20% had children under the age of 18 living with them, 54.00% were married couples living together, 12.30% had a female householder with no husband present, and 28.10% were non-families. 25.20% of all households were made up of individuals, and 14.30% had someone living alone who was 65 years of age or older. The average household size was 2.69 and the average family size was 3.21.

In the county, the population was spread out, with 28.00% under the age of 18, 8.70% from 18 to 24, 25.70% from 25 to 44, 20.90% from 45 to 64, and 16.80% who were 65 years of age or older. The median age was 36 years. For every 100 females there were 98.40 males. For every 100 females age 18 and over, there were 95.00 males.

The median income for a household in the county was $28,368, and the median income for a family was $35,218. Males had a median income of $23,439 versus $17,027 for females. The per capita income for the county was $14,269. About 13.80% of families and 18.60% of the population were below the poverty line, including 23.60% of those under age 18 and 19.40% of those age 65 or over.

== Politics ==
United States presidential election results for Gonzales County, Texas
Year	Republican		Democratic		Third party(ies)	
Year	No.	%	No.	%	No.	%
1912	318	17.41%	1,327	72.63%	182	9.96%
1916	649	27.26%	1,675	70.35%	57	2.39%
1920	748	30.11%	1,299	52.29%	437	17.59%
1924	463	14.07%	2,499	75.96%	328	9.97%
1928	1,112	45.74%	1,319	54.26%	0	0.00%
1932	337	9.04%	3,384	90.77%	7	0.19%
1936	352	11.61%	2,674	88.16%	7	0.23%
1940	722	19.35%	3,008	80.60%	2	0.05%
1944	841	21.09%	2,804	70.33%	342	8.58%
1948	666	18.51%	2,612	72.58%	321	8.92%
1952	2,249	46.71%	2,563	53.23%	3	0.06%
1956	1,767	43.77%	2,260	55.98%	10	0.25%
1960	1,554	36.22%	2,730	63.62%	7	0.16%
1964	1,190	26.18%	3,348	73.66%	7	0.15%
1968	1,476	33.63%	1,930	43.97%	983	22.40%
1972	2,707	69.84%	1,164	30.03%	5	0.13%
1976	1,789	35.59%	3,219	64.05%	18	0.36%
1980	2,931	49.49%	2,896	48.90%	95	1.60%
1984	3,962	64.19%	2,196	35.58%	14	0.23%
1988	2,983	50.42%	2,897	48.97%	36	0.61%
1992	2,502	45.02%	2,006	36.10%	1,049	18.88%
1996	2,687	51.85%	2,110	40.72%	385	7.43%
2000	4,092	67.42%	1,877	30.93%	100	1.65%
2004	4,291	71.26%	1,709	28.38%	22	0.37%
2008	4,076	64.83%	2,167	34.47%	44	0.70%
2012	4,216	69.61%	1,777	29.34%	64	1.06%
2016	4,587	72.25%	1,571	24.74%	191	3.01%
2020	5,627	73.57%	1,948	25.47%	73	0.95%
2024	5,981	77.12%	1,729	22.30%	45	0.58%

United States Senate election results for Gonzales County, Texas1
Year	Republican		Democratic		Third party(ies)	
Year	No.	%	No.	%	No.	%
2024	5,607	73.44%	1,849	24.22%	179	2.34%

United States Senate election results for Gonzales County, Texas2
Year	Republican		Democratic		Third party(ies)	
Year	No.	%	No.	%	No.	%
2020	5,617	74.59%	1,782	23.66%	132	1.75%

Texas Gubernatorial election results for Gonzales County
Year	Republican		Democratic		Third party(ies)	
Year	No.	%	No.	%	No.	%
2022	4,369	78.49%	1,129	20.28%	68	1.22%

== Communities ==
=== Cities ===
- Gonzales (county seat)
- Nixon (small part in Wilson County)
- Smiley
- Waelder

=== Unincorporated areas ===
- Bebe
- Belmont
- Leesville
- Ottine

=== Ghost towns ===
- Albuquerque
- Cheapside
- Cost
- Harwood
- Monthalia
- Pilgrim
- Thompsonville
- Wrightsboro

== Education ==
School districts include:

- Cuero Independent School District
- Gonzales Independent School District
- Moulton Independent School District
- Nixon-Smiley Consolidated Independent School District
- Shiner Independent School District
- Waelder Independent School District
- Yoakum Independent School District

All of the county is in the service area of Victoria College.

== See also ==
- National Register of Historic Places listings in Gonzales County, Texas
- Recorded Texas Historic Landmarks in Gonzales County
- List of museums in South Texas
