= List of Farm to Market Roads in Texas (1100–1199) =

- Texas Farm to Market Road and Ranch to Market Road markers

Highway names
- Interstates: Interstate Highway X (IH-X, I-X)
- US Highways: U.S. Highway X (US X)
- State: State Highway X (SH X)
- Loops: Loop X
- Spurs: Spur X
- Recreational: Recreational Road X (RE X)
- Farm or Ranch to Market Roads: Farm to Market Road X (FM X); Ranch to Market Road X (RM X)
- Park Roads: Park Road X (PR X)

System links
- Highways in Texas; Interstate; US; State; Former; Toll; Loops; Spurs; FM/RM; Park; Rec

Farm to Market Roads in Texas are owned and maintained by the Texas Department of Transportation (TxDOT).

== FM 1100 ==
Farm to Market Road 1100
- Location: Travis and Bastrop counties
- Length: 8.338 mi (13.419 km)
- Existed: October 29, 1953–present

Farm to Market Road 1100 (FM 1100) is located in Travis and Bastrop counties. It is 8.3 miles (13.36 km) in length.

FM 1100 begins at an intersection with US 290, between Manor and Elgin. It proceeds north 2.5 miles (4.0 km) and then east 5.8 miles (9.3 km) into Elgin, where it crosses SH 95 before terminating at Loop 109. Within Elgin, FM 1100 is named Main Street.

FM 1100 was reassigned to the current alignment between US 290 and SH 95. A segment of Loop 109 was transferred on October 19, 1990.

=== FM 1100 (1948) ===
Farm to Market Road 1100
- Location: Bexar and Atascosa counties
- Existed: December 16, 1948–May 25, 1953

A previous route numbered FM 1100 was designated on December 16, 1948, running from SH 346 (now SH 16) north of Poteet westward to Rossville at a distance of 6.6 miles (10.6 km). The highway was extended 9.4 miles (15.1 km) to a road intersection west of Somerset on December 18, 1951. FM 1100 was cancelled on May 25, 1953, with the mileage being transferred to FM 476.

== FM 1101 ==
Farm to Market Road 1101
- Location: Comal and Guadalupe counties
- Length: 10.269 mi (16.526 km)
- Existed: 1948–present

Farm to Market Road 1101 (FM 1101) is located in Comal and Guadalupe counties. The highway runs closely parallel to I-35 between SH 46 and Kohlenberg Road in New Braunfels.

FM 1101 begins at an intersection with SH 46 in New Braunfels. The highway travels along Freiheit Road and intersects FM 306 near a major retail center before leaving the city. After leaving New Braunfels, FM 1101 travels through more rural areas before ending at an intersection with SH 123 near Zorn.

FM 1101 was designated on December 16, 1948, running from FM 25 (now SH 46) to a road intersection at a distance of 3.8 miles (6.1 km). The highway was extended to a county road 4.1 miles (6.6 km) west of SH 123 on May 2, 1962, and to SH 123 on May 28, 1962, absorbing FM 2675.

Junction list

County	Location	mi	km	Destinations	Notes
Comal	New Braunfels	0.0	0.0	SH 46 – New Braunfels, Seguin	
Comal	New Braunfels	1.9	3.1	FM 306 west to I-35 – Canyon Lake	
Guadalupe		10.3	16.6	SH 123 – San Marcos, Seguin	
1.000 mi = 1.609 km; 1.000 km = 0.621 mi

== FM 1102 ==
Farm to Market Road 1102
- Location: Comal County
- Length: 7.41 mi (11.93 km)
- Existed: 1948–present

Farm to Market Road 1102 (FM 1102) is located in Comal County.

FM 1102 begins at an intersection with FM 306 in New Braunfels near Gruene. The highway travels in a generally northeast direction until an intersection with FM 2439. FM 1102 turns in a southern direction at the intersection and continues to travel in a generally southeast direction until ending at I-35 between San Marcos and New Braunfels.

FM 1102 was designated on December 16, 1948, running from US 81 at York Creek northwestward to a county road near Hunter at a distance of 1.2 miles (1.9 km). The highway was extended 4.2 miles (6.8 km) southwestward of Hunter on September 15, 1949, absorbing FM 1338 in the process. FM 1102 was extended 2.3 miles (3.7 km) to FM 306 on April 30, 1987.

Junction list

The entire route is in Comal County.

Location	mi	km	Destinations	Notes
New Braunfels	0.0	0.0	FM 306 to I-35 – Canyon Lake	
	6.3	10.1	FM 2439 north – San Marcos	
	7.4	11.9	I-35 / York Creek Road – Austin, San Antonio	I-35 exit 196
1.000 mi = 1.609 km; 1.000 km = 0.621 mi

== FM 1103 ==
Farm to Market Road 1103
- Location: Comal and Guadalupe counties
- Length: 5.918 mi (9.524 km)
- Existed: 1948–present

Farm to Market Road 1103 (FM 1103) is located in Comal and Guadalupe counties. Its southern terminus is in Cibolo, at FM 78. The route travels to the northeast and then doglegs to the northwest before entering Schertz and reaching its northern terminus at I-35 exit 178. The roadway continues as Hubertus Road, which provides access to FM 482.

FM 1103 was designated on December 16, 1948. The southern terminus was relocated on November 25, 1975, due to the realignment of FM 78 in Cibolo.

== FM 1104 ==
Farm to Market Road 1104
- Location: Guadalupe County
- Length: 5.763 mi (9.275 km)
- Existed: 1948–present

Farm to Market Road 1104 (FM 1104) is located in Guadalupe County.

FM 1104 begins at an intersection with FM 1150 southeast of Kingsbury. The highway has a junction with I-10 and enters the town. FM 1104 travels through the town in a northwest direction before ending at an intersection with US 90 east of the town square.

FM 1104 was designated on December 16, 1948, running from SH 80 south of Luling to the Darst Oil Field at a distance of 5.7 miles (9.2 km). The highway was extended 7.3 miles (11.7 km) to US 90 on January 29, 1949. The section of FM 1104 between the Darst Oil Field and SH 80 was transferred to FM 1150 on March 22, 1949.

Junction list

The entire route is in Guadalupe County.

Location	mi	km	Destinations	Notes
	0.0	0.0	FM 1150	
Kingsbury	2.7	4.3	I-10 – Seguin, Luling	I-10 exit 620
Kingsbury	5.8	9.3	US 90 – Seguin, Luling	
1.000 mi = 1.609 km; 1.000 km = 0.621 mi

== FM 1105 ==
Farm to Market Road 1105
- Location: Williamson County
- Length: 13.944 mi (Note: The certified length given is shorter than the actual mileage, as the TxDOT description of FM 1105 considers it to be discontinuous at rather than concurrent with FM 972.) (22.441 km)
- Existed: October 29, 1953–present

Farm to Market Road 1105 (FM 1105) is located in Williamson County.

FM 1105 begins at an intersection with FM 971 in Weir. The highway travels in a mostly northeastern and northwestern direction and has an overlap with FM 972 near the town of Walburg. FM 1105 travels in a slight northwestern direction after the overlap and runs through the communities of Theon and New Corn Hill before ending at an intersection with FM 487 in Schwertner.

The current FM 1105 was designated on October 29, 1953, traveling from FM 972 at Walburg to FM 1236 (now FM 487) at a distance of 10.1 miles (16.3 km). The highway was extended 5.3 miles (8.5 km) along FM 972 and southward to FM 2606 (now FM 971) at Weir on September 20, 1961.

Junction list

The entire route is in Williamson County.

Location	mi	km	Destinations	Notes
Weir	0.0	0.0	FM 971 – Georgetown, Granger	
Walburg	4.8	7.7	FM 972 east – Bartlett	South end of FM 972 overlap
	5.7	9.2	FM 972 west to I-35	North end of FM 972 overlap
Schwertner	14.8	23.8	FM 487 – Jarrell, Bartlett	
1.000 mi = 1.609 km; 1.000 km = 0.621 mi: Concurrency terminus

=== FM 1105 (1948) ===
Farm to Market Road 1105
- Location: Medina and Bexar counties
- Existed: December 16, 1948–January 29, 1953

A previous route numbered FM 1105 was designated on December 16, 1948, running from US 90 at Castroville to a road intersection 2 miles (3.2 km) north of Rio Medina at a total distance of 8.3 miles (13.4 km). The highway was extended 8.7 miles (14.0 km) to the Bexar County line on May 23, 1951. FM 1105 was extended 4.0 miles (6.4 km) into Bexar County to a road intersection on November 20, 1951. The highway was extended 4.0 miles (6.4 km) to another road intersection on December 17, 1952, running at a total distance of 24.4 miles (39.3 km). FM 1105 was cancelled on January 29, 1953, with the mileage being transferred to FM 471.

== FM 1106 ==
Farm to Market Road 1106
- Location: Montague County
- Length: 1.501 mi (2.416 km)
- Existed: October 21, 1981–present

Farm to Market Road 1106 (FM 1106) is located in Montague County.

FM 1106 is a two-lane route for its entire length. Its western terminus is northeast of Nocona at FM 3428, which provides access to FM 2634. The short route travels east and then north near the western side of Lake Nocona before state maintenance ends just north of Ash Street.

The current FM 1106 was designated on October 21, 1981, along the current route.

=== FM 1106 (1948) ===
Farm to Market Road 1106
- Location: Wilson County
- Existed: December 16, 1948–September 15, 1949

The first route numbered FM 1106 was designated on December 16, 1948, from US 87 in LaVernia to the Guadalupe County line; this route was cancelled and made a part of FM 775 in 1949.

=== FM 1106 (1951) ===
Farm to Market Road 1106
- Location: McMullen County
- Existed: May 23, 1951–March 27, 1981

The second route numbered FM 1106 was designated on May 23, 1951, on a short route from FM 63 (now SH 72) near Tilden southward 4.1 miles (6.6 km) in McMullen County; this route was transferred to FM 99 on March 27, 1981, due to the construction of Choke Canyon Reservoir, which submerged part of the old route of FM 99 (the southernmost 5.5 miles of the old route of FM 99 were previously designated as FM 2153).

== FM 1107 ==
Farm to Market Road 1107
- Location: Wilson County
- Length: 8.834 mi (14.217 km)
- Existed: 1948–present

Farm to Market Road 1107 (FM 1107) is located in Wilson County. The highway runs from Bus. US 87 in Stockdale to US 87 in Pandora.

FM 1107 was designated on December 16, 1948, running from US 87 (now Bus. US 87) in Stockdale to a road intersection at a distance of 3.9 miles (6.3 km). The highway was extended 6.0 miles (9.7 km) northeastward and southeastward to US 87 in Pandora on December 17, 1952.

Junction list

The entire route is in Wilson County.

Location	mi	km	Destinations	Notes
Stockdale	0.0	0.0	Bus. US 87 – Stockdale, Pandora	
	6.2	10.0	FM 3335 west to SH 123	
Pandora	8.8	14.2	US 87 – Nixon, Stockdale	
1.000 mi = 1.609 km; 1.000 km = 0.621 mi

== RM 1108 ==
Ranch to Market Road 1108
- Location: Culberson County
- Length: 9.828 mi (15.817 km)
- Existed: December 16, 1948 (Note: RM 1108 was originally designated as FM 1108 from 1948 to 1959.)–present

Ranch to Market Road 1108 (RM 1108) is located in Culberson County. Its southern terminus is at a pipeline booster station. The route travels east and then north before ending at RM 652.

RM 1108 was established on December 16, 1948, as Farm to Market Road 1108 (FM 1108), a 21.2-mile (34.1 km) road from US 62 at the New Mexico state line south to "the pipeline booster stations." Om March 15, 1949, the eastern 10.7 miles (17.2 km) of FM 1108 were reassigned as FM 1165 and the southern terminus was moved to 4.6 miles (7.4 km) west of the new junction with FM 1165. On October 27, 1959, the route was redesignated RM 1108. On April 29, 1975, the northern 5.2 miles (8.4 km) of the highway were reassigned to RM 652.

== FM 1109 ==
Farm to Market Road 1109
- Location: El Paso County
- Existed: December 16, 1948–May 27, 2010

Farm to Market Road 1109 (FM 1109) was located in El Paso County. No highway currently uses the FM 1109 designation.

FM 1109 was designated on December 16, 1948, running from US 80 (now SH 20) northwest of Tornillo southwestward to the Rio Grande River. The highway was to be cancelled on June 30, 2005, but was not to be cancelled until construction of the new farm to market road (which was later designated as FM 3380 and an extension) had started. FM 1109 was not cancelled until May 27, 2010, with maintenance being handed over to the county.

== FM 1110 ==
Farm to Market Road 1110
- Location: El Paso County
- Length: 4.895 mi (Note: The certified length given is shorter than the actual mileage, as the TxDOT description of FM 1110 considers it to be discontinuous at rather than concurrent with FM 76.) (7.878 km)
- Existed: 1948–present

Farm to Market Road 1110 (FM 1110) is located in El Paso County.

FM 1110 begins at an intersection with FM 258 in San Elizario. The highway travels east along San Elizario Road and enters Clint just before an intersection with SH 20. FM 1110 travels in a slight northeast direction through the town and turns north at Fenter Road and travels along Clint Cut-Off Road before intersecting FM 76. The two highways have an overlap together before FM 1110 turns off onto Clint-San Elizario Road. FM 1110 travels in a northeast direction before ending at I-10.

FM 1110 was designated on December 16, 1948, running from FM 76 via Clint to San Elizario at a distance of 3.7 miles (6.0 km). The highway was extended along FM 76 and to I-10 on May 25, 1976. On June 27, 1995, the section between FM 258 and FM 76 was redesignated Urban Road 1110 (UR 1110). The designation of this section reverted to FM 1110 with the elimination of the Urban Road system on November 15, 2018.

Junction list

The entire route is in El Paso County.

Location	mi	km	Destinations	Notes
San Elizario	0.0	0.0	FM 258 – El Paso, Fabens	
Clint	2.4	3.9	SH 20 (Alameda Avenue)	
Clint	3.7	6.0	FM 76 west (North Loop Drive)	South end of FM 76 overlap
Clint	4.9	7.9	FM 76 east (North Loop Drive)	North end of FM 76 overlap
Clint	6.1	9.8	I-10 – El Paso, Van Horn	I-10 exit 42
1.000 mi = 1.609 km; 1.000 km = 0.621 mi: Concurrency terminus

== RM 1111 ==
Ranch to Market Road 1111
- Location: Hudspeth County
- Length: 47.018 mi (75.668 km)
- Existed: November 23, 1948 (Note: RM 1111 was originally designated as FM 1111 from 1948 to 1957.)–present

Ranch to Market Road 1111 (RM 1111) is located in Hudspeth County.

The southern terminus of RM 1111 is approximately 5 miles (8.0 km) south of Sierra Blanca at the intersection of Cowan Road and Indian Hot Springs Road. From here, the route runs north through Sierra Blanca, intersecting I-10 at exit 107. RM 1111 turns east and then north before ending at US 62/US 180 east of Cornudas.

RM 1111 was designated on December 16, 1948, as Farm to Market Road 1111 (FM 1111) from US 80 (present-day Bus. I-10), northward approximately 24 miles (39 km). On May 23, 1951, this was extended a further 19 miles (31 km) to US 62. On December 6, 1957, FM 1111 became RM 1111 and the section south of present-day I-10 Business was added.

Junction list

The entire route is in Hudspeth County.

Location	mi	km	Destinations	Notes
	0.0	0.0	Cowan Rd., Indian Hot Springs Rd.	Southern terminus
Sierra Blanca	4.7	7.6	I-10 – Fort Hancock, Van Horn	I-10 exit 107
Sierra Blanca	4.8	7.7	Bus. I-10-C	Former US 80
	43.5	70.0	RM 2317	
	47.0	75.6	US 62 / US 180 – El Paso, Pine Springs	Northern terminus
1.000 mi = 1.609 km; 1.000 km = 0.621 mi

== FM 1112 ==
Farm to Market Road 1112
- Location: Presidio County
- Length: 2.896 mi (4.661 km)
- Existed: 1948–present

Farm to Market Road 1112 (FM 1112) is located in Presidio County.

The western terminus of FM 1112 is at SH 17 in Marfa. The route travels east on E. Oak Street before turning north on Golf Course Road and ending at the Marfa Municipal Golf Course.

FM 1112 was designated on December 16, 1948, between Marfa and the original Marfa Airport.

== FM 1113 ==
Farm to Market Road 1113
- Location: Coryell County
- Length: 10.408 mi (16.750 km)
- Existed: 1948–present

Farm to Market Road 1113 (FM 1113) is located in Coryell County.

FM 1113 begins at an intersection with FM 580 in the community of Topsey. The highway travels in a generally southern direction and turns in a slight southeast direction near County Road 31. FM 1113 enters Copperas Cove and travels along Avenue B, passing by several subdivisions before intersecting FM 116 near the town square. The two highways travel along 1st Street before turning onto Avenue D. FM 1113 travels along Avenue D with FM 116 before ending at an intersection with Bus. US 190.

FM 1113 was designated on December 16, 1948, running from FM 116 to US 190 (now Bus. US 190) at a distance of 0.8 miles (1.3 km). The highway was extended 10.14 miles (16.32 km) to Topsey on May 23, 1951. On June 27, 1995, the section between FM 116 and US 190 was redesignated Urban Road 1113 (UR 1113). The designation of this section reverted to FM 1113 with the elimination of the Urban Road system on November 15, 2018.

Junction list

The entire route is in Coryell County.

Location	mi	km	Destinations	Notes
Topsey	0.0	0.0	FM 580 – Lampasas, Gatesville	
Copperas Cove	9.5	15.3	FM 116 north (1st Street) – Gatesville	West end of FM 116 overlap
Copperas Cove	10.4	16.7	Bus. US 190 / FM 116 south – Killeen, Lampasas	East end of FM 116 overlap
1.000 mi = 1.609 km; 1.000 km = 0.621 mi: Concurrency terminus

== FM 1114 ==
Farm to Market Road 1114
- Location: Coryell County
- Length: 0.335 mi (539 m)
- Existed: December 16, 1948–present

Farm to Market Road 1114 (FM 1114) is located in Coryell County. State maintenance begins along The Grove Road at an intersection with CR 356 in The Grove. FM 1114 runs north 0.3 miles (0.5 km) to SH 36. The roadway continues north beyond this intersection as SH 236.

FM 1114 was designated on December 16, 1948, along the current route.

== FM 1115 ==
Farm to Market Road 1115
- Location: Fayette and Gonzales counties
- Length: 10.978 mi (17.667 km)
- Existed: 1948–present

Farm to Market Road 1115 (FM 1115) is located in Fayette and Gonzales counties.

FM 1115 begins at an intersection with US 90 / SH 97 in Waelder. The highway travels through town along Avenue E and intersects FM 1296 before leaving the city limits. FM 1115 travels in a slight northeast direction and turns east near the Gonzales–Fayette county line before turning north at an intersection with FM 2762. The highway continues to run in a mostly northern direction before ending at an intersection with SH 95 near Cistern.

FM 1115 was designated on November 23, 1948, running from US 90 northward to a road intersection at a distance of 4.0 miles (6.4 km). The highway was extended 7.9 miles (12.7 km) to SH 95 on July 28, 1955.

Junction list

County	Location	mi	km	Destinations	Notes
Gonzales	Waelder	0.0	0.0	US 90 / SH 97 south – Luling, Flatonia, Gonzales	
Gonzales	Waelder	0.3	0.48	FM 1296 north	
Fayette		6.8	10.9	FM 2762 east – Flatonia	
Fayette		11.0	17.7	SH 95 – Smithville, Flatonia	
1.000 mi = 1.609 km; 1.000 km = 0.621 mi

== FM 1116 ==
Farm to Market Road 1116
- Location: Gonzales County
- Length: 17.009 mi (27.373 km)
- Existed: December 16, 1948–present

Farm to Market Road 1116 (FM 1116) is located in Gonzales County.

FM 1116 begins at an intersection with US 87 between Smiley and Westhoff. The highway travels in a predominately northeast direction through mostly rural farmland. FM 1116 travels through the town of Pilgrim and ends at an intersection with SH 97 south of Gonzales.

FM 1116 was designated on December 16, 1948, running southward from SH 200 (now SH 97) at a distance of 3.0 miles (4.8 km). The highway was extended 1.7 miles (2.7 km) on May 23, 1951. FM 1116 was extended 6.2 miles (10.0 km) southward on September 29, 1954. The highway was extended 7.1 miles (11.4 km) to US 87 on October 31, 1958.

== FM 1117 ==
Farm to Market Road 1117
- Location: Gonzales and Guadalupe counties
- Length: 21.763 mi (35.024 km)
- Existed: 1948–present

Farm to Market Road 1117 (FM 1117) is located in Gonzales and Guadalupe counties. The highway connects rural farm area West Capote–Leesville with the towns of Nixon and Seguin. The section of FM 1117 in Guadalupe County is known as Raymond Stotzer Highway.

FM 1117 begins at an intersection with SH 80 / SH 97 in Sandies–Leesville, 2 miles (3.2 km) north of Nixon city limits. The highway travels in a northwest direction through West Capote–Leesville, including developed areas in Guadalupe County in the Zion Hill area. FM 1117 intersects with West Capote’s FM 466 southeast of Seguin and crosses the Guadalupe River. The highway ends at an intersection with US 90 Alt. east of Seguin near the Randolph Air Force Base Auxiliary Airport.

FM 1117 was designated on November 23, 1948, running from SH 80 north of Nixon to Dewville at a distance of 7.0 miles (11.3 km). The highway was extended 1.8 miles (2.9 km) to the Guadalupe County line on June 2, 1967, and to FM 466 on June 15, 1967, absorbing 11.6 miles (18.7 km) of FM 2770 in the process. FM 1117 was extended 3.3 miles (5.3 km) to US 90 Alt. on November 19, 1979.

Junction list

County	Location	mi	km	Destinations	Notes
Gonzales	Leesville	0.0	0.0	SH 80 (SH 97) – Luling, Nixon	
Guadalupe	West Capote Hills	18.5	29.8	FM 466 – Seguin	
Guadalupe	Old Seguin	21.8	35.1	US 90 Alt. – Seguin, Gonzales	
1.000 mi = 1.609 km; 1.000 km = 0.621 mi

== FM 1118 ==
Farm to Market Road 1118
- Location: Kleberg County
- Length: 6.67 mi (10.73 km)
- Existed: 1948–present

Farm to Market Road 1118 (FM 1118) is located in Kleberg County.

FM 1118 was designated on December 16, 1948, from US 77 at Ricardo east 3.6 miles (5.8 km). On June 2, 1967, the route was extended east and south to its current eastern terminus at FM 772.

== FM 1119 ==
Farm to Market Road 1119
- Location: Leon and Madison counties
- Length: 19.957 mi (32.118 km)
- Existed: 1948–present

Farm to Market Road 1119 (FM 1119) is located in Leon and Madison counties.

FM 1119 begins at an intersection with SH OSR northwest of Midway. The highway travels in a northwestern direction through land that alternates between farm land and heavily forested areas. FM 1119 enters into Centerville and travels along Cass Street before ending at an intersection with SH 7 one block east of SH 75.

FM 1119 was designated on December 16, 1948, running from SH 7 in Centerville southeast towards Middleton at a distance of 6.0 miles (9.7 km). The highway was extended 4.3 miles (6.9 km) southeastward to Middleton on May 23, 1951. FM 1119 was extended 5.0 miles (8.0 km) to the old FM 2036 on May 2, 1962, and on to SH OSR on May 25, 1962, replacing 6.3 miles (10.1 km) of the old FM 2036.

Junction list

County	Location	mi	km	Destinations	Notes
Madison		0.0	0.0	SH OSR – Midway, Normangee	
Leon		5.3	8.5	FM 579 south	
Leon		8.0	12.9	FM 977 west – Leona	
Leon		10.5	16.9	FM 811 north	
Leon	Centerville	20.0	32.2	SH 7 – Marquez, Crockett	
1.000 mi = 1.609 km; 1.000 km = 0.621 mi

== FM 1120 ==
Farm to Market Road 1120
- Location: Real County
- Length: 7.534 mi (12.125 km)
- Existed: December 16, 1948–present

Farm to Market Road 1120 (FM 1120) is located in Real County. Its southern terminus is at US 83 just north of the Uvalde County line. The 7.5-mile-long (12.1 km) route travels east to the community of Rio Frio, intersecting RM 2748 and turning north. FM 1120 runs along the Frio River before turning west, reaching its northern terminus at another intersection with US 83 south of the Leakey city limits.

FM 1120 was designated on December 16, 1948, from US 83 south of Leakey southeast 3.1 miles (5.0 km). On May 3, 1949, another section was designated from Rio Frio to US 83, replacing FM 1121, created a gap in the route. This gap was closed on July 15, 1949.

== FM 1121 ==
Farm to Market Road 1121
- Location: McCulloch County
- Length: 9.472 mi (Note: The certified length given is shorter than the actual mileage, as the TxDOT description of FM 1121 considers it to be discontinuous at rather than concurrent with US 377.) (15.244 km)
- Existed: May 23, 1951–present

Farm to Market Road 1121 (FM 1121) is located in McCulloch County.

FM 1121 begins at an intersection with US 283 northwest of Brady. The highway travels in an eastern direction and intersects FM 2996 before having a short overlap with US 377. FM 1121 travels in a northeast direction along the overlap before returning to an eastern direction. The highway continues to run in an eastern direction before ending at an intersection with US 190 in Rochelle.

The current FM 1121 was designated on May 23, 1951, traveling from US 190 in Rochelle westward to US 377 at a distance of 4.8 miles (7.7 km). The highway was extended 5.0 miles (8.0 km) to US 283 on October 31, 1958, creating an overlap with US 377 in the process.

Junction list

The entire route is in McCulloch County.

Location	mi	km	Destinations	Notes
	0.0	0.0	US 283 – Coleman, Brady	
	2.0	3.2	FM 2996 south – Brady	
	4.8	7.7	US 377 south – Brady	West end of US 377 overlap
	5.8	9.3	US 377 north – Brownwood	East end of US 377 overlap
Rochelle	10.5	16.9	US 190 – San Saba, Brady	
1.000 mi = 1.609 km; 1.000 km = 0.621 mi: Concurrency terminus

=== FM 1121 (1948) ===
Farm to Market Road 1121
- Location: Real County
- Existed: December 15, 1948–May 3, 1949

A previous route numbered FM 1121 was designated on December 15, 1948, running from Rio Frio to US 83 at a distance of 1.9 miles (3.1 km). The highway was cancelled on May 3, 1949, with the mileage being transferred to FM 1120.

== FM 1122 ==
Farm to Market Road 1122
- Location: Hardin County
- Length: 3.046 mi (4.902 km)
- Existed: May 23, 1951–present

Farm to Market Road 1122 (FM 1122) is located in Hardin County. Its western terminus is at FM 418 near the community of Reeves. The road travels almost due east for approximately 3.0 miles (4.8 km) to an intersection with FM 92.

FM 1122 was designated on May 23, 1951, along the current route.

=== FM 1122 (1948) ===
Farm to Market Road 1122
- Location: Brown County
- Existed: November 23, 1948–June 16, 1949

A previous route numbered FM 1122 was designated in Brown County on November 23, 1948, running approximately 14.8 miles (23.8 km) southward from US 67/US 84 in Bangs to FM 586. This route was combined with FM 586 on June 16, 1949.

== FM 1123 ==
Farm to Market Road 1123
- Location: Bell County
- Length: 12.743 mi (20.508 km)
- Existed: 1949–present

Farm to Market Road 1123 (FM 1123) is located in Bell County.

FM 1123 begins at an intersection with SH 95 in Holland concurrent with FM 2268. The two highways travel in a slight northwest direction along Travis Street before turning northeast onto Lexington Street. FM 2268 leaves the overlap at Josephine Street while FM 1123 continues to run along Lexington Street. The highway turns to the northwest at Roberts Road and runs in a slight northwest direction before turning back towards the north at Barnes Road. FM 1123 crosses the Salado Creek and passes near several resorts near the creek. The highway turns in a western direction and crosses the Lampasas River before turning back north. FM 1123 ends at an intersection with FM 436 southeast of Belton.

FM 1123 was designated on January 27, 1949, along the current route.

== FM 1124 ==
Farm to Market Road 1124
- Location: Freestone County
- Length: 1.84 mi (2.96 km)
- Existed: January 27, 1949–present

Farm to Market Road 1124 (FM 1124) is located in Freestone County.

FM 1124 begins at an intersection with FM 488 northeast of Fairfield and travels in a southeastern direction before ending at an intersection with County Road 210.

FM 1124 was designated on January 27, 1949, running from FM 488 northeast of Fairfield, northeastward to Young at a distance of 6.5 miles (10.5 km). The highway was extended 3.8 miles (6.1 km) northwestward to FM 488 on June 28, 1963. Approximately 3.5 miles (5.6 km) of FM 1124 between Young and FM 2570 was removed from the state highway system, while 6.3 miles (10.1 km) of the highway was transferred to FM 2570 on January 23, 1984.

== FM 1125 ==
Farm to Market Road 1125
- Location: Jack and Montague counties
- Length: 15.136 mi (24.359 km)
- Existed: 1949–present

== FM 1126 ==
Farm to Market Road 1126
- Location: Navarro County
- Length: 22.248 mi (35.805 km)
- Existed: 1949–present

Farm to Market Road 1126 (FM 1126) is located in Navarro County.

FM 1126 begins at an intersection with SH 31 southwest of Corsicana. The highway travels in a northwest direction and has an overlap with FM 744 and intersects SH 22 in Barry. FM 1126 continues to run in a northwest direction and turns northeast at an intersection with FM 2930. The highway enters Emhouse and intersects FM 1839 and FM 3383 in the town. FM 1126 continues to run in a northeast direction before ending at I-45 / US 287 just south of Rice.

FM 1126 was designated on January 27, 1949, running from SH 22 northwestward to Cryer Creek then northeastward to a county road at Emhouse, at a distance of 8.4 miles (13.5 km). The highway was extended 7.7 miles (12.4 km) southwestward to SH 31 on July 25, 1951, absorbing Spur 32 in the process. FM 1126 was extended 3.9 miles (6.3 km) northeastward on October 31, 1958. FM 1126 was extended 2.9 miles (4.7 km) northeastward to I-45 on November 24, 1959.

Junction list

The entire route is in Navarro County.

Location	mi	km	Destinations	Notes
	0.0	0.0	SH 31 – Waco, Corsicana	
	1.8	2.9	FM 744 east – Corsicana	South end of FM 744 overlap
	2.3	3.7	FM 744 west – Malone	North end of FM 744 overlap
Barry	7.5	12.1	SH 22 – Blooming Grove, Corsicana	
	10.1	16.3	FM 2930 west to FM 55	
Emhouse	14.9	24.0	FM 1839 south to SH 22	
Emhouse	15.4	24.8	FM 3383 south – Corsicana	
	22.2	35.7	I-45 (US 287) – Ennis, Corsicana	I-45 exit 239
1.000 mi = 1.609 km; 1.000 km = 0.621 mi: Concurrency terminus

== FM 1127 ==
Farm to Market Road 1127
- Location: San Jacinto County
- Length: 6.713 mi (10.804 km)
- Existed: May 23, 1951–present

Farm to Market Road 1127 (FM 1127) is located in San Jacinto County.

FM 1127 begins at an intersection with US 59 north of Shepherd. The highway travels in an eastern direction and turns northeast at Mussel Shoals and travels through the Drew's Landing community before turning back to the east. FM 1127 passes a subdivision before running parallel to the Trinity River before state maintenance ends with the road continuing as Watson Road.

The current FM 1127 was designated on May 23, 1951, along the current route.

Junction list

The entire route is in San Jacinto County.

Location	mi	km	Destinations	Notes
	0.0	0.0	US 59 (Future I-69) – Livingston, Cleveland	I-69/US 59 exit 180B northbound, 181 southbound; U.S. 59 is the future Interstate 69
	4.0	6.4	FM 3342 south	
	6.7	10.8	Watson Road	
1.000 mi = 1.609 km; 1.000 km = 0.621 mi

=== FM 1127 (1949) ===
Farm to Market Road 1127
- Location: Navarro County
- Existed: January 27, 1949–October 26, 1949

A previous route numbered FM 1127 was designated on January 27, 1949, running from Rush Prairie to SH 31 in Dawson at a distance of 8.1 miles (13.0 km). The highway was cancelled and combined with FM 639 on October 26, 1949 (now partially inundated, and rest now FM 1578 and FM 709).

== FM 1128 ==
Farm to Market Road 1128
- Location: Brazoria County
- Length: 6.826 mi (10.985 km)
- Existed: May 23, 1951–present

Farm to Market Road 1128 (FM 1128) is located in Brazoria County.

FM 1128 is a short urban road running between Manvel and Pearland. The southern terminus is at SH 6 in Manvel. The route travels north along Masters Road; it crosses Bailey Road at the city limits of Pearland, in which it is known as Manvel Road. The FM 1128 designation ends at FM 518.

The current route of FM 1128 was designated on May 23, 1951.

=== FM 1128 (1949) ===
Farm to Market Road 1128
- Location: Navarro County
- Existed: January 27, 1949–May 26, 1949

FM 1128 was originally designated on a route in Navarro County from SH 31 east of Powell to a mile south; this route was cancelled on May 26, 1949, in exchange for creation the section of FM 636 from FM 1129 to Montfort.

== FM 1129 ==
Farm to Market Road 1129
- Location: Navarro County
- Length: 14.893 mi (23.968 km)
- Existed: 1949–present

Farm to Market Road 1129 (FM 1129) is located in Navarro County.

FM 1129 begins at an intersection with SH 31 just west of Powell. The highway runs roughly parallel to I-45 for its entire length and ends at an intersection with FM 85 between Ennis and Seven Points.

FM 1129 was designated on January 27, 1949, running from SH 31 near Powell to near Montfort at a distance of 8.4 miles (13.5 km). The highway was extended 4.9 miles (7.9 km) north later that year on July 15. A spur connection to Roane was created on April 28, 1950. FM 1129 was extended 6.1 miles (9.8 km) to FM 85 on October 26, 1954. The section of highway between FM 85 and FM 662 was transferred to FM 85 on October 30, 1961. The spur connection to Roane was transferred to FM 3041 on May 19, 1966.

Junction list

The entire route is in Navarro County.

Location	mi	km	Destinations	Notes
	0.0	0.0	SH 31 – Corsicana, Athens	
	4.5	7.2	FM 3041 – Corsicana, Roane	
	7.7	12.4	FM 636 – Kerens	
	10.9	17.5	FM 1603 west – Chatfield	
	14.9	24.0	FM 85 – Ennis, Aley	
1.000 mi = 1.609 km; 1.000 km = 0.621 mi

== FM 1130 ==
Farm to Market Road 1130
- Location: Orange County
- Length: 11.274 mi (18.144 km)
- Existed: 1949–present

Farm to Market Road 1130 (FM 1130) is located in Orange County. It runs from FM 1136 northeast and southeast to FM 3247.

FM 1130 was designated on January 27, 1949, to run from SH 87 (now Little Cypress Drive) northwest to a county road near Lemonville, then southwest to FM 1136. On January 26, 1950, the road was extended south over the old alignment of SH 87, replacing FM 1559. On July 29, 1953, the road was shortened by 1.3 miles (2.1 km). On February 27, 1962, the section from FM 1134 to I-10 was cancelled, and the road was rerouted east and north on March 14, 1962, replacing FM 1134 and creating a concurrency with SH 87. On May 5, 1966, the road was extended on the other end to I-10. On April 25, 1978, the road was extended to FM 105. On September 13, 1989, the section from FM 105 to FM 1136 became part of FM 1442, and the section that was formerly FM 1134 became part of FM 3247.

== FM 1131 ==
Farm to Market Road 1131
- Location: Orange and Jasper counties
- Length: 15.745 mi (25.339 km)
- Existed: 1949–present

Farm to Market Road 1131 (FM 1131) is located in Orange and Jasper counties. It runs from FM 105 north of Vidor northwest, north, and northeast to FM 2246.

FM 1131 was designated on January 27, 1949, to run from FM 105 northwest to the Orange/Jasper county line. On September 20, 1961, the road was extended north to another point on FM 105, replacing FM 2576. On August 31, 1967, the road was extended northeast to FM 2246, creating a concurrency with FM 105.

== FM 1132 ==
Farm to Market Road 1132
- Location: Orange County
- Length: 4.611 mi (7.421 km)
- Existed: 1949–present

Farm to Market Road 1132 (FM 1132) is located in Orange County. It runs from FM 105 north of Vidor, southeast to US 90.

FM 1132 was designated on January 27, 1949, to run from SH 235 (now SH 12) northeast of Vidor to FM 105. On December 17, 1952, the road was extended southeast to US 90, creating a concurrency with SH 235; this concurrency would be eliminated on September 27, 1957 when SH 235 (which would be changed to SH 12 in August 1959) was rerouted on a new route to the southwest.

== FM 1133 ==
Farm to Market Road 1133
- Location: Hill County
- Length: 1.009 mi (1.624 km)
- Existed: May 2, 1962–present

Farm to Market Road 1133 (FM 1133) is located in Hill County. It runs from FM 3370 in Aquilla to FM 1304.

FM 1133 was designated on May 2, 1962, on the current route; at the time the north end was at FM 310 (which swapped with FM 3370 on March 28, 1985).

=== FM 1133 (1949) ===
Farm to Market Road 1133
- Location: Orange County
- Existed: January 27, 1949–June 24, 1953

A previous route numbered FM 1133 was designated on January 27, 1949, from Spur 171 (now FM 1006) north 1.6 miles (2.6 km) to a county road. FM 1133 was cancelled on June 24, 1953, and eliminated from the highway system to allow funding for extension of US 90.

== FM 1134 ==
Farm to Market Road 1134
- Location: Clay County
- Length: 2.806 mi (4.516 km)
- Existed: October 29, 1992–present

Farm to Market Road 1134 (FM 1134) is located in Clay County. From US 82 west of Ringgold, it runs south 2.8 miles (4.5 km) before state maintenance ends. The roadway continues under county jurisdiction as Worsham Road, which leads to FM 1288.

FM 1134 was designated on October 29, 1992, along the current route.

=== FM 1134 (1949) ===
Farm to Market Road 1134
- Location: Orange County
- Existed: January 27, 1949–March 14, 1962

The first route numbered FM 1134 was designated in Orange County on January 27, 1949, from the then-proposed location of SH 87 north of Orange northeast 1.9 miles (3.1 km) toward Echo. On November 21, 1955, the designation was extended west to FM 1130. This FM 1134 was cancelled on March 14, 1962, and its mileage was transferred to a relocated FM 1130 (later FM 3247). The old route of FM 1130 south to I-10 was given to the city of Orange on February 27, 1962.

=== FM 1134 (1964) ===
Farm to Market Road 1134
- Location: Ellis County
- Existed: May 6, 1964–August 18, 1987

The second route numbered FM 1134 was designated in Ellis County on May 6, 1964, from US 77 in Italy to I-35E. This FM 1134 was cancelled on August 18, 1987, and its mileage was transferred to SH 34.

== FM 1135 ==
Farm to Market Road 1135
- Location: Orange County
- Length: 4.068 mi (6.547 km)
- Existed: January 27, 1949–present

Farm to Market Road 1135 (FM 1135) is located in Orange County. It runs from US 90 in Vidor south to FM 105.

FM 1135 was designated on January 27, 1949, on the current route. It was cancelled on March 29, 1952, to allow funding for extension of US 90 but was reinstated on December 17, 1952.

== FM 1136 ==
Farm to Market Road 1136
- Location: Orange County
- Length: 5.25 mi (8.45 km)
- Existed: 1949–present

Farm to Market Road 1136 (FM 1136) is located in Orange County. It runs from SH 12 near Mauriceville southeast to US 90.

FM 1136 was designated on January 27, 1949, on the current route.

== FM 1137 ==
Farm to Market Road 1137
- Location: Anderson County
- Length: 4.508 mi (7.255 km)
- Existed: October 28, 1953–present

Farm to Market Road 1137 (FM 1137) is located in Anderson County. It runs from US 84 near Palestine east to a county road.

FM 1137 was designated on October 28, 1953, on the current route.

=== FM 1137 (1949) ===
Farm to Market Road 1137
- Location: Orange County
- Existed: January 27, 1949–March 29, 1952

A previous route numbered FM 1137 was designated on January 27, 1949, from SH 62 near Peveto northeast 3.2 miles (5.1 km) to FM 1130. FM 1137 was cancelled on March 29, 1952, and eliminated from the highway system to allow funding for extension of US 90. The route was revived starting on October 29, 1953 and September 29, 1954 as part of FM 406 (this section was later renumbered FM 1078).

== FM 1138 ==
Farm to Market Road 1138
- Location: Rockwall and Collin counties
- Length: 7.928 mi (Note: The certified length given is shorter than the actual mileage, as the TxDOT description of FM 1138 considers it to be discontinuous at rather than concurrent with FM 6.) (12.759 km)
- Existed: January 27, 1949–present

Farm to Market Road 1138 (FM 1138) is located in Rockwall and Collin counties.

FM 1138 begins at an intersection with SH 66 between Fate and Royse City. The highway travels in a northern direction to Nevada and has an overlap with FM 6 through the town. FM 1138 leaves the overlap and returns to traveling in a northern direction before ending at an intersection with FM 1778.

FM 1138 was designated on January 27, 1949, running from US 67 (now SH 66) northward to a road intersection at a distance of 1.2 miles (1.9 km). The highway was extended 7.1 miles (11.4 km) to FM 6 and FM 1778 on September 26, 1953.

Junction list

County	Location	mi	km	Destinations	Notes
Rockwall		0.0	0.0	SH 66 – Rockwall, Royse City	
Collin		2.2	3.5	FM 2755 west – Lavon	
Collin	Nevada	5.3	8.5	FM 6 west – Lavon	South end of FM 6 overlap
Collin	Nevada	5.9	9.5	FM 6 east – Josephine	North end of FM 6 overlap
Collin	Nevada	8.5	13.7	FM 1778 – Copeville, Josephine	
1.000 mi = 1.609 km; 1.000 km = 0.621 mi: Concurrency terminus

== FM 1139 ==
Farm to Market Road 1139
- Location: Rockwall County
- Length: 2.794 mi (4.497 km)
- Existed: January 27, 1949–present

Farm to Market Road 1139 (FM 1139) is located in Rockwall County. The highway connects FM 549 in southeastern Rockwall to FM 550 in McLendon-Chisholm.

FM 1139 was designated on January 27, 1949, along the current route.

== FM 1140 ==
Farm to Market Road 1140
- Location: Rockwall County
- Length: 2.451 mi (3.945 km)
- Existed: January 27, 1949–present

Farm to Market Road 1140 (FM 1140) is located in Rockwall County in the town of Heath.

FM 1140 begins at an intersection with FM 740 (Laurence Drive) / Hubbard Drive near Towne Center Park. The highway travels in a northwest direction along Smirl Drive and turns northeast at Darr Road. FM 1140 travels near Lake Ray Hubbard and turns east at Mariah Bay Drive. Smirl Drive turns into Laurence Drive at Old Ridge Road before the highway ends at an intersection with FM 740 (Ridge Road / Laurence Drive) / Heathland Crossing.

The highway was designated on January 27, 1949, along the current route. On June 27, 1995, the entire route was redesignated Urban Road 1140 (UR 1140). The designation reverted to FM 1140 with the elimination of the Urban Road system on November 15, 2018.

== FM 1141 ==
Farm to Market Road 1141
- Location: Rockwall County
- Length: 2.464 mi (3.965 km)
- Existed: 1949–present

Farm to Market Road 1141 (FM 1141) is located in Rockwall County. It runs from FM 552 to SH 66 east of Rockwall.

FM 1141 was designated on January 27, 1949, on the current route.

== FM 1142 ==
Farm to Market Road 1142
- Location: Scurry and Kent counties
- Length: 15.449 mi (24.863 km)
- Existed: January 22, 1957–present

Farm to Market Road 1142 (FM 1142) is located in Scurry and Kent counties. It runs from US 84 northwest of Snyder north to a road intersection north of the Polar Community.

FM 1142 was designated on January 22, 1957, on the current route.

=== FM 1142 (1949) ===
Farm to Market Road 1142
- Location: Rockwall County
- Existed: January 27, 1949–November 4, 1955

A previous route numbered FM 1142 was designated on January 27, 1949, from FM 548 near Blackland southeast 2.9 miles (4.7 km) to a county road. On July 15, 1949, the road was extended southwest to SH 205. FM 1142 was cancelled on November 4, 1955, and mileage was transferred to rerouted FM 548, while the old route of FM 548 from what is now SH 276 to SH 205 was transferred to FM 1143 (now SH 276) and FM 550.

== FM 1143 ==
Farm to Market Road 1143
- Location: Bell County
- Length: 0.525 mi (845 m)
- Existed: May 7, 1970–present

Farm to Market Road 1143 (FM 1143) is located in the city of Temple.

FM 1143 begins at a junction with I-35 in northern Temple. The highway travels in a slight southeastern direction along Industrial Boulevard before ending at an intersection with Spur 290.

The current FM 1143 was designated on May 7, 1970, running from 15th Street to Spur 290 at a distance of 0.2 miles (0.32 km). The highway was extended 0.3 miles (0.48 km) northwestward to Industrial Boulevard on September 2, 1971. On June 27, 1995, the entire route was redesignated Urban Road 1143 (UR 1143). The highway's western terminus was moved to the northbound frontage road of I-35 in 2014 as part of the My35 construction project. The designation reverted to FM 1143 with the elimination of the Urban Road system on November 15, 2018.

=== FM 1143 (1949) ===
Farm to Market Road 1143
- Location: Rockwall County
- Existed: January 27, 1949–November 26, 1969

A previous route numbered FM 1143 was designated on January 27, 1949, running from FM 549 eastward to FM 551 at a distance of 3.1 miles (5.0 km). The highway was extended eastward to the Rockwall–Hunt county line and westward to a county road on November 4, 1955, absorbing FM 1395, FM 2376, and parts of FM 548 and FM 551, with those two highways being rerouted. FM 1143 was extended westward from FM 549 to SH 205 on October 31, 1957. The highway was cancelled on November 26, 1969, and was replaced by SH 276.

== FM 1144 ==
Farm to Market Road 1144
- Location: Karnes County
- Length: 15.04 mi (24.20 km)
- Existed: 1949–present

Farm to Market Road 1144 (FM 1144) is located in Karnes County. It runs from US 181 near Karnes City west, south, and southeast to FM 99 in Coy City.

FM 1144 was designated on January 27, 1949, to run from US 181 at Karnes City west 10.5 miles (16.9 km) to a county road. On January 4, 1952, the road was extended east over the old route of US 181 to SH 80. On October 26, 1983, the road was extended south and southwest to SH 80. On June 21, 1990, the section from US 181 to SH 80 was transferred to Bus. US 181.

== FM 1145 ==
Farm to Market Road 1145
- Location: Karnes County
- Length: 1.107 mi (1.782 km)
- Existed: 1949–present

Farm to Market Road 1145 (FM 1145) is located in Karnes County. It runs from Bus. US 181 in Kenedy west to SH 72.

FM 1145 was designated on January 27, 1949, on the current route.

== FM 1146 ==
Farm to Market Road 1146
- Location: Leon County
- Length: 7.017 mi (11.293 km)
- Existed: 1948–present

Farm to Market Road 1146 (FM 1146) is located in Leon County. It runs from US 79 north of Marquez north to FM 1469.

FM 1146 was designated on August 26, 1948, to run from US 79 northwest 2.5 miles (4.0 km). On November 25, 1975, the road extended north to US 79.

== FM 1147 ==
Farm to Market Road 1147
- Location: Leon County
- Length: 2.996 mi (4.822 km)
- Existed: 1948–present

Farm to Market Road 1147 (FM 1147) is located in Leon County. It runs from SH 7 east of Marquez south to Bolling.

FM 1147 was designated on August 26, 1948, on the current route.

== FM 1148 ==
Farm to Market Road 1148
- Location: Stephens and Palo Pinto counties
- Length: 17.951 mi (28.889 km)
- Existed: January 27, 1949 (Note: FM 1148 was originally designated as RM 1148 from 1949 to 1992.)–present

Farm to Market Road 1148 (FM 1148) is located in Stephens and Palo Pinto counties. It runs from SH 67 in Ivan east to a county road.

FM 1148 was designated on January 27, 1949 as Ranch to Market Road 1148 (RM 1148), running from SH 67 east to Bunger Road, which became FM 1287 in May 1950. On February 27, 1951, the road was extended east to the Stephens/Palo Pinto County Line. On September 27, 1961, the road was extended east 4.7 miles (7.6 km). On November 25, 1975, the road was extended 3.3 miles (5.3 km) to a county road. On May 5, 1992, the road was changed to FM 1148.

== FM 1149 ==
Farm to Market Road 1149
- Location: Lamar and Red River counties
- Length: 2.524 mi (4.062 km)
- Existed: January 29, 1949–present

Farm to Market Road 1149 (FM 1149) is located in Lamar and Red River counties. It runs from US 271 in Deport east 2.5 miles (4.0 km) to FM 410.

FM 1149 was established on January 29, 1949, along the current route.

== FM 1150 ==
Farm to Market Road 1150
- Location: Guadalupe County
- Length: 10.806 mi (17.391 km)
- Existed: 1949–present

Farm to Market Road 1150 (FM 1150) is located in Guadalupe County. It runs from US 90A near Seguin to SH 80 near Luling.

FM 1150 was designated on January 29, 1949, to run from SH 3 (now US 90A) northeast to FM 1104 at Darst Oil Field. On March 22, 1949, the road was extended east to SH 80, replacing a section of FM 1104.

== FM 1151 ==
Farm to Market Road 1151
- Location: Armstrong and Randall counties
- Length: 37.411 mi (60.207 km)
- Existed: 1949–present

Farm to Market Road 1151 (FM 1151) is located in Armstrong County. It runs from FM 1541 south of Amarillo east to FM 294. There is a break at US 287 in Claude, and also a spur connection to SH 207 in Claude.

FM 1151 was designated on February 25, 1949, to run from FM 284 (now FM 1151 Spur) in Claude west 8.1 miles (13.0 km) to a road intersection. On July 25, 1951, the road was extended west and north 7.0 miles (11.3 km) to another road intersection. On March 26, 1952, the road was extended north to US 287 in Washburn. On October 18, 1954, the section from US 287 south 5.2 miles (8.4 km) was renumbered FM 2250. The road was extended west to FM 1541 eight days later. On November 24, 1959, concurrencies with FM 284 and US 287 were created, and the road was extended east 3.8 miles (6.1 km) from US 287 to a road intersection. On May 27, 1960, the road was extended east to FM 294. On June 10, 1966, the concurrency with FM 284 was removed, and a spur connection was added on the old route of FM 284 (which SH 207 would extend over most of in May 1967).

== FM 1152 ==
Farm to Market Road 1152
- Location: Baylor County
- Length: 10.256 mi (16.505 km)
- Existed: 1949–present

Farm to Market Road 1152 (FM 1152) is located in Baylor County. It runs from US 277 in Bomarton south and east to the former site of the Mary's Creek School, and then north to US 277.

FM 1152 was designated on February 25, 1949, on the current route.

== FM 1153 ==
Farm to Market Road 1153
- Location: Baylor County
- Length: 2.036 mi (3.277 km)
- Existed: February 25, 1949–present

Farm to Market Road 1153 (FM 1153) is located in Baylor County. It runs from RM 1919 north of Seymour to a point 2 miles (3.2 km) west.

FM 1153 was designated on February 25, 1949, from US 82, 0.4 miles (0.64 km) north of Seymour, north 1.4 miles (2.3 km) and west 3 miles (4.8 km). On January 30, 1951, a 1-mile (1.6 km) segment of the west–east section was cancelled in exchange for the creation of FM 1604 (now RM 1919). On January 14, 1957, the section from US 82 to a point 1.4 miles (2.3 km) north became a portion of RM 1919 (now RM Spur 1919).

== FM 1154 ==
Farm to Market Road 1154
- Location: Cass County
- Length: 1.655 mi (2.663 km)
- Existed: May 24, 1955–present

Farm to Market Road 1154 (FM 1154) is located in Cass County. It runs from FM 96 west of Atlanta north to Atlanta state park.

FM 1154 was designated on May 24, 1955, on the current route.

=== FM 1154 (1949) ===
Farm to Market Road 1154
- Location: Newton County
- Existed: February 25, 1949–January 29, 1953

A previous route numbered FM 1154 was designated on February 25, 1949, from SH 63 at Burkeville southeastward 1.4 miles (2.3 km) to a road intersection. On July 15, 1949, the road was extended southeast 2.3 miles (3.7 km) to another road intersection. On November 20, 1951, the road was extended southeast 0.7 miles (1.1 km). FM 1154 was cancelled on January 29, 1953, and mileage was transferred to FM 1414.

== FM 1155 ==
Farm to Market Road 1155
- Location: Washington County
- Length: 21.036 mi (33.854 km)
- Existed: 1949–present

Farm to Market Road 1155 (FM 1155) is located in Washington County.

FM 1155 begins at an intersection with FM 1371 in Chappell Hill. The highway intersects US 290 and FM 2447 before leaving the town. North of Chappell Hill, FM 1155 runs in a mostly northern direction and runs through farmland with some rural subdivisions and turns east at FM 2193. The highway runs in an eastern direction and turns back north near an intersection with FM 2726 and turns northeast at FM 912. FM 1155 intersects FM 1370 before running through the town of Washington and turns northwest near Washington-on-the-Brazos State Historic Site. The highway continues to run in a northwest direction before ending at an intersection with SH 105.

FM 1155 was designated on February 25, 1949, running from SH 90 (now SH 105) near Washington southward at a distance of 5.0 miles (8.0 km) and from US 290 (now FM 1371) at Chappell Hill northeast at a distance of 6.0 miles (9.7 km). The southern section of highway was extended 3.1 miles (5.0 km) northeast on January 18, 1952. FM 1155 was extended 1.66 miles (2.67 km) eastward on August 24, 1954, when US 290 was relocated near Chappell Hill. The southern section of highway was renumbered as FM 2447 on November 21, 1956, and the remainder of FM 1155 was extended to FM 2193, absorbing part of that highway in the process. On March 5, 1963, part of FM 912 was transferred.

Junction list

The entire route is in Washington County.

Location	mi	km	Destinations	Notes
Chappell Hill	0.0	0.0	FM 1371	
Chappell Hill	0.1	0.16	US 290 – Brenham, Hempstead	
Chappell Hill	0.7	1.1	FM 2447 (Chestnut Street)	
	7.9	12.7	FM 2193 west	
	13.5	21.7	FM 2726 north	
	18.1	29.1	FM 912 west	
	18.9	30.4	FM 1370 south	
Washington	19.5	31.4	PR 12 east – Washington-on-the-Brazos State Historic Site	
	21.0	33.8	SH 105 – Brenham, Navasota	
1.000 mi = 1.609 km; 1.000 km = 0.621 mi

== FM 1156 ==
Farm to Market Road 1156
- Location: Jack County
- Length: 12.371 mi (19.909 km)
- Existed: 1949–present

Farm to Market Road 1156 (FM 1156) is located in Jack County. It runs from US 380 northeast and south to SH 199 in Joplin.

FM 1156 was designated on March 30, 1949, to run from US 281 near Jacksboro east 7.8 miles (12.6 km) towards Wizard Wells. On July 14, 1949, the road was shortened to 5.8 miles (9.3 km) to stay within funding for construction. On May 23, 1951, the road was extended east 3.7 miles (6.0 km), and the road was extended 2.0 miles (3.2 km) to Wizard Wells on November 20, 1951. On November 21, 1956, the road was extended south to SH 199. On June 4, 1964, the section from then-RM 2475 west to US 281 was transferred to the new SH 824 (which also replaced a section of RM 2475; SH 824 and RM 2475 later became part of rerouted SH 24, now US 380).

== FM 1157 ==
Farm to Market Road 1157
- Location: Jackson County
- Length: 11.578 mi (18.633 km)
- Existed: 1949–present

Farm to Market Road 1157 (FM 1157) is located in Jackson County. It runs from SH 172 in Ganado east to SH 111.

FM 1157 was designated on February 25, 1949, to run from SH 172 in Ganado east 10.6 miles (17.1 km) to a road intersection. On July 14, 1949, the road was extended east to SH 111.

== FM 1158 ==
Farm to Market Road 1158
- Location: Red River County
- Length: 3.801 mi (6.117 km)
- Existed: February 25, 1949–present

Farm to Market Road 1158 (FM 1158) is a 3.801-mile (6.117 km) state road in Red River County that connects FM 114 (south-southwest of White Rock) with County Road 3230 (north of White Rock).

FM 1158 was designated on February 25, 1949, from FM 114 near Clarksville north 2.9 miles (4.7 km) to a road intersection near Whiterock. It was extended north 1.0 mile (1.6 km) to another road intersection on July 14, 1949.

== FM 1159 ==
Farm to Market Road 1159
- Location: Red River County
- Length: 24.153 mi (38.870 km)
- Existed: February 25, 1949–present

Farm to Market Road 1159 (FM 1159) is located in Red River County. It runs from Bus. US 82 in Clarksville, northeast and northwest to SH 37.

FM 1159 was designated on February 25, 1949, from US 82 near Clarksville north 4.4 miles (7.1 km) to a road intersection. It was extended northeast 2.5 miles (4.0 km) on August 24, 1955, and another 8.9 miles (14.3 km) to Ackworth on November 24, 1959. On September 27, 1960, FM 1159 was extended northwest 7.6 miles (12.2 km) to SH 37.

== FM 1160 ==
Farm to Market Road 1160
- Location: Wharton County
- Length: 18.402 mi (29.615 km)
- Existed: 1949–present

== FM 1161 ==
Farm to Market Road 1161
- Location: Wharton County
- Length: 13.933 mi (22.423 km)
- Existed: 1949–present

== FM 1162 ==
Farm to Market Road 1162
- Location: Wharton and Matagorda counties
- Length: 21.448 mi (34.517 km)
- Existed: 1949–present

== FM 1163 ==
Farm to Market Road 1163
- Location: Wharton County
- Length: 8.598 mi (13.837 km)
- Existed: 1949–present

== FM 1164 ==
Farm to Market Road 1164
- Location: Wharton County
- Length: 6.713 mi (10.804 km)
- Existed: 1949–present

Farm to Market Road 1164 (FM 1164) is located in Wharton County. Its western terminus is at US 90 Alt. approximately 5 miles (8 km) west of East Bernard. The two-lane road runs south-southeast before making a 90-degree turn to the east-northeast at CR 254. It proceeds to East Bernard, where it reaches its eastern terminus at SH 60.

FM 1164 was designated on February 25, 1949, from US 90 Alt. southeastward 2.9 miles (4.7 km). The former community of Nottawa was located at the junction with US 90 Alt. FM 1164 was extended to SH 60 on November 20, 1951. On June 1, 1965, FM 1164 was extended concurrent with SH 60 and then southeast to the San Bernard River, adding approximately 3.5 miles (5.6 km). On January 18, 1967, this extension was transferred to FM 2919, reverting FM 1164 to its 1951 description.

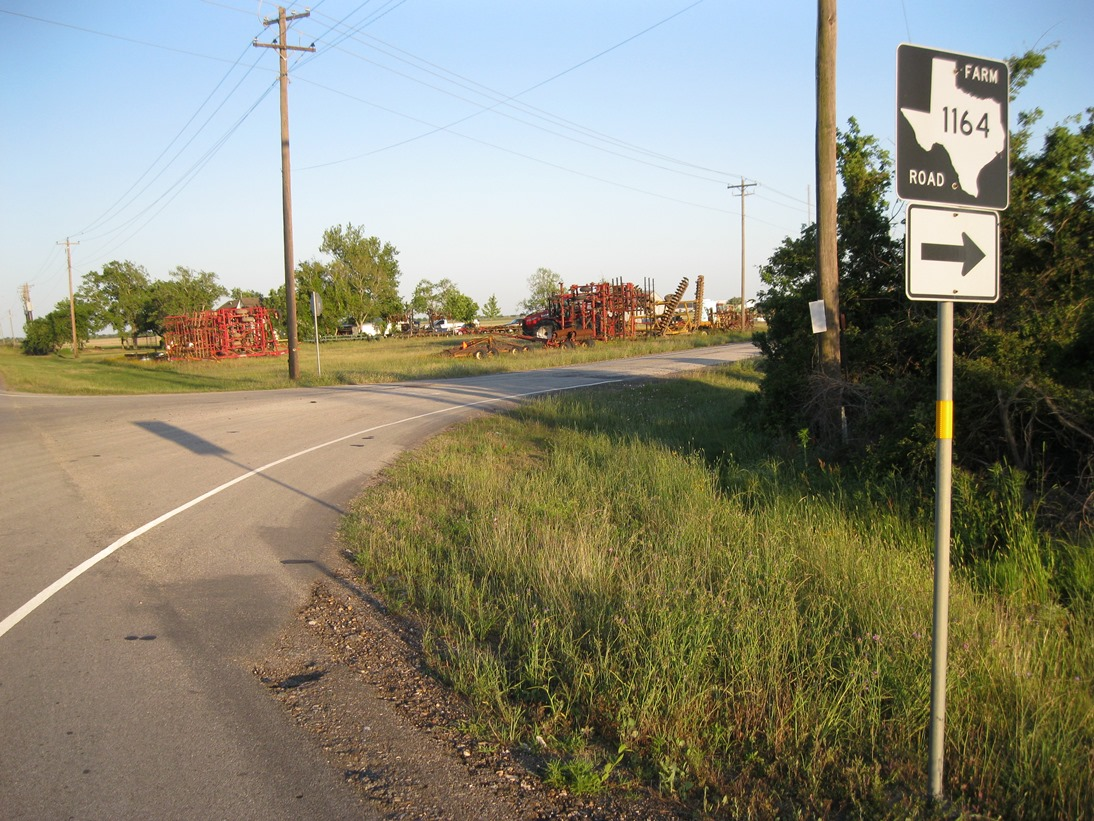
Junction of US 90 Alt. and FM 1164 at former site of Nottawa

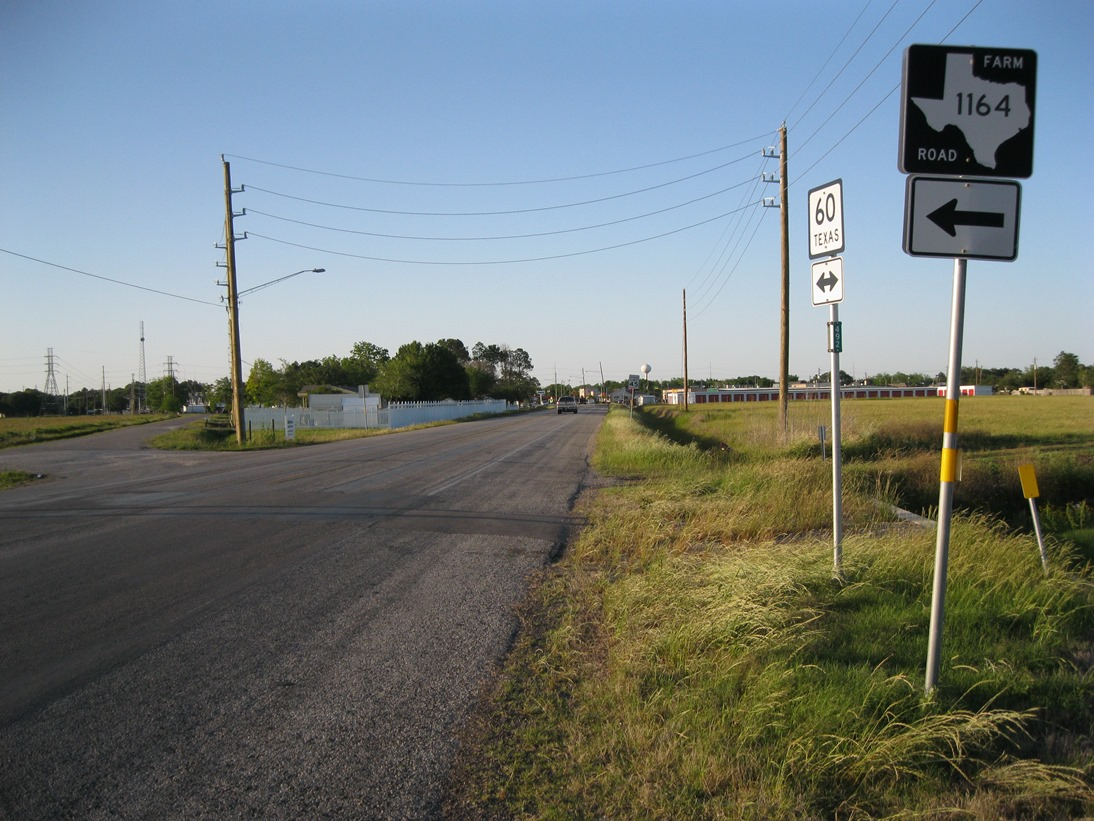
Intersection of FM 1164 and SH 60 south of East Bernard

== RM 1165 ==
Ranch to Market Road 1165
- Location: Culberson County
- Length: 0.932 mi (1,500 m)
- Existed: March 15, 1949 (Note: RM 1165 was originally designated as FM 1165 from 1948 to 1959.)–present

Ranch to Market Road 1165 (RM 1165) is located in Culberson County. Its western terminus is at RM 652, approximately 4.5 miles (7.2 km) east of that route's junction with RM 1108. The route travels 0.9 miles (1.4 km) east to a pipeline booster station.

The route was designated as Farm to Market Road 1165 (FM 1165) on March 15, 1949, from FM 1108 (now RM 1108) eastward 6.2 miles (10.0 km) to its current eastern terminus. On October 27, 1959, the designation was changed to RM 1165. On June 30, 1964, the western segment was transferred to RM 652.

== FM 1166 ==
Farm to Market Road 1166
- Location: Hardeman County
- Length: 13.793 mi (22.198 km)
- Existed: March 29, 1949–present

== FM 1167 ==
Farm to Market Road 1167
- Location: Hardeman County
- Length: 16.331 mi (26.282 km)
- Existed: March 29, 1949–present

== FM 1168 ==
Farm to Market Road 1168
- Location: King and Cottle counties
- Length: 11.975 mi (19.272 km)
- Existed: March 29, 1949–present

== FM 1169 ==
Farm to Market Road 1169
- Location: Cochran County
- Length: 13.274 mi (21.362 km)
- Existed: March 30, 1949–present

Farm to Market Road 1169 is located in Cochran County. It runs from SH 214 south of Morton to SH 125.

FM 1169 was designated on March 30, 1949 from SH 214 in Morton east to a road intersection. On September 28, 1949 the western terminus was moved 2.5 miles south of Morton and the route was flipped to run west and south instead of east. On January 14, 1952 the road was extended 2.6 miles west to FM 1578. On March 29, 1961 the road was extended west to FM 769 (now SH 125), replacing FM 1578.

== FM 1170 ==
Farm to Market Road 1170
- Location: Nolan County
- Length: 26.96 mi (43.39 km)
- Existed: October 28, 1953–present

Farm to Market Road 1170 (FM 1170) is located in Nolan County.

FM 1170 was designated on October 28, 1953, from SH 70 in Blackwell northeastward 4.0 miles (6.4 km). The road was numbered on November 17, 1953 or later. On July 28, 1955, FM 1170 was extended northeast to FM 53 (now SH 153). On November 21, 1956, FM 1170 was extended northwest 5 miles (8.0 km) from SH 70. On May 2, 1962, FM 1170 was extended northwest 5 miles (8.0 km). On June 28, 1963, FM 1170 was extended north 4.3 miles (6.9 km) to FM 2600. On July 26, 1963, FM 1170 was extended north to FM 608, replacing FM 2600.

Junction list

The entire route is in Nolan County.

Location	mi	km	Destinations	Notes
	0.0	0.0	FM 608 – Maryneal	
Blackwell	16.7	26.9	SH 70 – Sweetwater, Bronte	
	27.0	43.5	SH 153 – Sweetwater, Wingate	
1.000 mi = 1.609 km; 1.000 km = 0.621 mi

=== FM 1170 (1949) ===
Farm to Market Road 1170
- Location: Denton County
- Existed: March 30, 1949–November 17, 1953

A previous route numbered FM 1170 was designated on March 30, 1949, from SH 24 (now US 380) northward 3.3 miles (5.3 km) to a road intersection. On October 28, 1953, the road was extended north to FM 428. On November 17, 1953, FM 1170 was cancelled and mileage was transferred to FM 1385.

== FM 1171 ==
Farm to Market Road 1171
- Location: Denton County
- Length: 14.935 mi (24.036 km)
- Existed: March 30, 1949–present

== FM 1172 ==
Farm to Market Road 1172
- Location: Parmer County
- Length: 22.506 mi (36.220 km)
- Existed: April 28, 1955–present

Farm to Market Road 1172 (FM 1172) is located in Parmer County.

FM 1172 was designated on April 28, 1955, from FM 690 (now FM 145) at Lazbuddie northward 1.0 mile (1.6 km) to a road intersection. On November 21, 1956, FM 1172 was extended northward and eastward 3.0 miles (4.8 km). On October 31, 1957, FM 1172 was changed so that it went straight north 4.0 miles (6.4 km), and was extended north to SH 86. On June 1, 1965, FM 1172 was extended north to US 60.

=== FM 1172 (1949) ===
Farm to Market Road 1172
- Location: Denton County
- Existed: March 30, 1949–January 6, 1955

A previous route numbered FM 1172 was designated on March 30, 1949, from FM 156 in Justin northeast 4.1 miles (6.6 km) to a road intersection. On July 15, 1949, FM 1172 was extended east to US 377. On October 28, 1953, FM 1172 was extended east to FM 1830. On January 6, 1955, FM 1172 was cancelled and mileage was transferred to FM 407.

== FM 1173 ==
Farm to Market Road 1173
- Location: Denton County
- Length: 14.386 mi (23.152 km)
- Existed: March 30, 1949–present

Farm to Market Road 1173 (FM 1173) is located in Denton County.

FM 1173 begins at an intersection with FM 455 between Slidell and Bolivar. The highway travels in a southern direction mainly through farm land before turning east at Donald Road. FM 1173 travels in an eastern direction and turns southeast at Palmview Road and travels near a few subdivisions before entering Krum, intersecting with FM 156. The highway turns back east at Evans Avenue and passes near a large subdivision before entering Denton and ending at an intersection with the southbound frontage road of I-35.

FM 1173 was designated on March 30, 1949, running from FM 156 at Krum northwestward to a county road at distance of 12.4 miles (20.0 km) along a former routing of FM 156. The county road became part of FM 425 on May 23, 1951, which in turn became part of FM 455 on June 25, 1952. FM 1173 was extended 3.5 miles (5.6 km) eastward from FM 156 to US 77 on October 26, 1954.

== RM 1174 ==
Ranch to Market Road 1174
- Location: Burnet County
- Length: 23.094 mi (37.166 km)
- Existed: October 28, 1953 (Note: RM 1174 was originally designated as FM 1174 from 1953 to 1956.)–present

Ranch to Market Road 1174 (RM 1174) is located in Burnet County.

RM 1174 was designated October 28, 1953, as Farm to Market Road 1174 (FM 1174), running from FM 963 (now RM 963) southwestward to FM 243 (now RM 243) at Bertram at a distance of 9.8 miles (15.8 km). On October 1, 1956, FM 1174 was changed to RM 1174. On October 31, 1957, RM 1174 was extended south to RM 1869. On May 7, 1974, RM 1174 was extended southward 4.0 miles (6.4 km). On November 25, 1975, RM 1174 was extended southward 3.3 miles (5.3 km) to RM 1431, its current terminus.

=== FM 1174 (1949) ===
Farm to Market Road 1174
- Location: Hockley County
- Existed: March 30, 1949–February 24, 1953

A previous route numbered FM 1174 was designated on March 30, 1949, running from SH 51 westward to a road intersection at a distance of 3.5 miles (5.6 km). The highway was extended 2.4 miles (3.9 km) westward to FM 300 near Sundown on May 23, 1951. FM 1174 was cancelled on February 24, 1953, with the mileage being transferred to FM 41.

== FM 1175 ==
Farm to Market Road 1175
- Location: Sabine County
- Length: 0.978 mi (1,574 m)
- Existed: November 24, 1959–present

=== FM 1175 (1949) ===
Farm to Market Road 1175
- Location: Hockley County
- Existed: March 30, 1949–November 1, 1954

The first route numbered FM 1175 was designated on March 30, 1949, running from US 84 in Anton eastward to the Hockley–Lubbock county line. On December 17, 1952, the road was extended west to SH 51 (now US 385). FM 1175 was cancelled on November 1, 1954 and transferred to FM 597.

=== FM 1175 (1954) ===
Farm to Market Road 1175
- Location: Castro County
- Existed: October 26, 1954–October 15, 1955

The second route numbered FM 1175 was designated on October 26, 1954 (it was numbered as such on November 1, 1954, or later), from SH 51, 4.7 miles (7.6 km) north of the Castro–Lamb county line, eastward to the Castro–Swisher county line. FM 1175 was cancelled on October 15, 1955 and transferred to FM 145.

=== FM 1175 (1957) ===
Farm to Market Road 1175
- Location: Reeves County
- Existed: October 31, 1957–January 29, 1959

The third route numbered FM 1175 was designated in Reeves County on October 31, 1957, from SH 17 at Saragosa to a point 5.3 miles (8.5 km). FM 1175 was cancelled on January 29, 1959 and removed from the highway system in exchange for creating FM 2448.

== FM 1176 ==
Farm to Market Road 1176
- Location: Brown and Coleman counties
- Length: 40.193 mi (64.684 km)
- Existed: 1949–present

== FM 1177 ==
Farm to Market Road 1177
- Location: Clay and Wichita counties
- Length: 7.573 mi (12.188 km)
- Existed: May 26, 1949–present

Farm to Market Road 1177 (FM 1177) is located in northern Wichita and Clay counties. The route lies just south of the Red River and the Oklahoma state line. It is 7.6 miles (12.2 km) in length.

FM 1177 was designated on May 26, 1949, along its current route.

== FM 1178 ==
Farm to Market Road 1178
- Location: Callahan County
- Length: 9.669 mi (15.561 km)
- Existed: October 31, 1957–present

=== FM 1178 (1949) ===
Farm to Market Road 1178
- Location: Bell County
- Existed: May 25, 1949–September 2, 1955

A previous route numbered FM 1178 was designated on May 25, 1949, from US 81 at Troy eastward 3.0 miles (4.8 km) to a road intersection. On July 14, 1949, the road was extended eastward 3.4 miles (5.5 km) to the Bell–Falls county line at Belfalls. FM 1178 was cancelled on September 2, 1955, and mileage was transferred to FM 935.

== FM 1179 ==
Farm to Market Road 1179
- Location: Brazos County
- Length: 15.213 mi (24.483 km)
- Existed: 1949–present

Farm to Market Road 1179 (FM 1179) is located in Brazos County. It runs from SH 47 in Bryan, northeastward to FM 2038, 3 miles (4.8 km) southeast of Kurten. It is known as Villa Maria Road from SH 47 to the Villa Maria-Briarcrest split, and as Briarcrest Drive from the split to FM 158.

FM 1179 was designated on May 26, 1949, from FM 158 northeast 2.5 miles (4.0 km) to Steep Hollow Community. On November 20, 1951, FM 1179 was extended northeast 4.8 miles (7.7 km) to Reliance Church. On September 27, 1960, FM 1179 was extended northeast to FM 2038. On November 17, 1977, FM 1179 was extended to SH 6. On December 14, 1989, FM 1179 was extended to then-proposed SH 47. On October 28, 1992, FM 1179 was extended to FM 60. On June 27, 1995, the section from FM 158 to FM 60 was redesignated Urban Road 1179 (UR 1179). On October 26, 1995, the section from SH 47 to FM 60 was removed from the state highway system. The remainder of the section that had been redesignated UR 1179 reverted to FM 1179 with the elimination of the Urban Road system on November 15, 2018.

Junction list

The entire route is in Brazos County.

Location	mi	km	Destinations	Notes
Bryan	0.0	0.0	SH 47	Interchange
Bryan	2.7	4.3	FM 2818 (Harvey Mitchell Parkway)	Interchange
Bryan	3.5	5.6	To FM 2154 south (Wellborn Road)	
Bryan	4.4	7.1	Bus. SH 6 (Texas Avenue)	
Bryan	6.5	10.5	SH 6 (Earl Rudder Freeway)	Interchange; future I-14
Bryan	7.3	11.7	FM 158 (Boonville Road) – Bryan, Huntsville	
	15.2	24.5	FM 2038 – Kurten	
1.000 mi = 1.609 km; 1.000 km = 0.621 mi

== FM 1180 ==
Farm to Market Road 1180
- Location: Archer and Wichita counties
- Length: 10.194 mi (16.406 km)
- Existed: 1949–present

== FM 1181 ==
Farm to Market Road 1181
- Location: Ellis County
- Length: 15.176 mi (24.423 km)
- Existed: 1949–present

Farm to Market Road 1181 (FM 1181) is located in Ellis County. It begins at Bus. I-45/SH 34 in Ennis. The highway travels along Creechville Road and has a junction with I-45 at exit 251A before leaving the city. It travels through Creechville and Telico before ending at an intersection with SH 34 east of Ennis.

FM 1181 was designated on June 8, 1949, from US 75 (now Bus. I-45) south of Ennis northeastward 12.5 miles (20.1 km) via Creechville and Telico to SH 34. A 5.2-mile-long (8.4 km) segment was cancelled and turned over to the county for maintenance on January 18, 1952. FM 1181 was extended 2.9 miles (4.7 km) along a new route to a county road on March 26, 1953. The highway was extended 2.0 miles (3.2 km) to SH 34 on October 25, 1955, running east of the old FM 1181.

== FM 1182 ==
Farm to Market Road 1182
- Location: Ellis County
- Length: 4.227 mi (6.803 km)
- Existed: 1949–present

Farm to Market Road 1182 (FM 1182) is located in Ellis County.

FM 1182 begins at I-45/US 287 between Alma and Rice. The highway travels in a predominately northeast direction and turns north at Gentry Road. FM 1182 continues to travel in a more northern direction before ending at an intersection with FM 85.

FM 1182 was designated on June 8, 1949, along the current route.

== FM 1183 ==
Farm to Market Road 1183
- Location: Ellis County
- Length: 8.215 mi (13.221 km)
- Existed: 1949–present

Farm to Market Road 1183 (FM 1183) is located in Ellis County.

FM 1183 begins at I-45/US 287 in Alma. The highway travels in a southwest direction through the town and turns northwest at Oak Grove Road in Ennis. FM 1183 enters the main part of the city after an intersection with US 287. The highway travels along Oak Grove Road in Ennis before traveling along SW Main Street at SH 34. FM 1183 ends at an intersection with Bus. US 287.

It was designated on June 8, 1949, on its current route, but it continued 3 blocks east via current Bus. US 287. On June 18, 1996, the redundant three-block section was removed.

Junction list

The entire route is in Ellis County.

Location	mi	km	Destinations	Notes
Alma	0.0	0.0	I-45 (US 287) – Dallas, Corsicana	I-45 exit 246
Ennis	5.1	8.2	US 287 – Waxahachie, Corsicana	
Ennis	7.5	12.1	SH 34 (Lake Bardwell Drive, Creechville Road) to I-45 – Italy	
Ennis	8.2	13.2	Bus. US 287 (Ennis Avenue) to SH 34	
1.000 mi = 1.609 km; 1.000 km = 0.621 mi

== FM 1184 ==
Farm to Market Road 1184
- Location: Lamar County
- Length: 6.513 mi (10.482 km)
- Existed: 1949–present

== FM 1185 ==
Farm to Market Road 1185
- Location: Caldwell County
- Length: 4.663 mi (7.504 km)
- Existed: October 28, 1953–present

=== FM 1185 (1949) ===
Farm to Market Road 1185
- Location: Lamar County
- Existed: August 25, 1949–January 16, 1953

A previous route numbered FM 1185 was designated on August 25, 1949, from US 82 in Blossom northward to FM 195 in Faught. FM 1185 was cancelled on January 16, 1953, and mileage was transferred to FM 196.

== FM 1186 ==
Farm to Market Road 1186
- Location: Panola and Harrison counties
- Length: 14.508 mi (23.348 km)
- Existed: 1949–present

== FM 1187 ==
Farm to Market Road 1187
- Location: Tarrant and Parker counties
- Length: 34.401 mi (55.363 km)
- Existed: 1949–present

== FM 1188 ==
Farm to Market Road 1188
- Location: Erath County
- Length: 23.176 mi (37.298 km)
- Existed: 1949–present

== FM 1189 ==
Farm to Market Road 1189
- Location: Erath, Hood, and Parker counties
- Length: 33.779 mi (54.362 km)
- Existed: 1949–present

== FM 1190 ==
Farm to Market Road 1190
- Location: Denton County
- Length: 1.179 mi (1.897 km)
- Existed: February 3, 1987–present

Farm to Market Road 1190 (FM 1190) is located in Denton County near Lake Ray Roberts.

FM 1190 begins at an intersection with FM 455 in eastern Sanger. The highway travels in a northeastern direction and intersects with FM 2164 before ending at the Sanger Access Point Boat Ramp.

The current FM 1190 was designated on February 3, 1987, along the current route. The highway was created when FM 455 was rerouted due to the construction of Lake Ray Roberts.

=== FM 1190 (1949) ===
Farm to Market Road 1190
- Location: Hood County
- Existed: July 14, 1949–December 20, 1984

FM 1190 was first designated on July 14, 1949, running from FM 208 (now FM 4) at Acton to Falls Creek School at a distance of 5.5 miles (8.9 km). The highway was cancelled on December 20, 1984, with the mileage being transferred to FM 167.

== FM 1191 ==
Farm to Market Road 1191
- Location: Jack and Young counties
- Length: 26.988 mi (43.433 km)
- Existed: 1949–present

== FM 1192 ==
Farm to Market Road 1192
- Location: Denton County
- Length: 2.763 mi (Note: The certified length given is shorter than the actual mileage, as the TxDOT description of FM 1192 considers it to be discontinuous at rather than concurrent with Bus. US 377.) (4.447 km)
- Existed: February 3, 1987–present

Farm to Market Road 1192 (FM 1192) is located in Denton County, running from Ray Roberts Lake State Park - Jordan Unit to US 377/FM 455 in Pilot Point.

The current FM 1192 was designated on February 3, 1987, along the current route. The highway was created when FM 455 was rerouted due to the construction of Lake Ray Roberts.

Junction list

The entire route is in Denton County.

Location	mi	km	Destinations	Notes
	0.0	0.0	Ray Roberts Lake State Park - Jordan Unit	
Pilot Point	1.8	2.9	Bus. US 377 north (Washington Street)	West end of Bus. US 377 overlap
Pilot Point	1.9	3.1	Bus. US 377 south (Washington Street)	East end of Bus. US 377 overlap
Pilot Point	2.8	4.5	US 377 / FM 455 – Whitesboro, Aubrey	
1.000 mi = 1.609 km; 1.000 km = 0.621 mi

=== FM 1192 (1949) ===
Farm to Market Road 1192
- Location: Hood and Johnson counties
- Existed: July 14, 1949–December 20, 1984

FM 1192 was first designated on July 14, 1949, running from SH 171 near Cleburne westward to a road intersection at a distance of 8.2 miles (13.2 km). The highway was extended to 4.8 miles (7.7 km) to another road intersection on December 17, 1952. FM 1192 was extended 8.5 miles (13.7 km) to FM 1190 near Acton on November 26, 1969, absorbing FM 3026. The highway was cancelled on December 20, 1984, with the mileage being transferred to FM 208. FM 208 was transferred to FM 4 on February 25, 1985.

== FM 1193 ==
Farm to Market Road 1193
- Location: Collin County
- Length: 0.702 mi (1,130 m)
- Existed: May 6, 1964–present

Farm to Market Road 1193 (FM 1193) is located in Collin County in the town of Prosper.

FM 1193 begins at an intersection with Coleman Street (Bus. SH 289 before August 30, 2018) near the town square. The highway travels east along Broadway Street before ending at an intersection with SH 289 (Preston Road).

The current FM 1193 was designated on May 6, 1964, along the current route.

=== FM 1193 (1949) ===
Farm to Market Road 1193
- Location: Palo Pinto County
- Existed: July 14, 1949–February 6, 1953

FM 1193 was first designated on July 14, 1949, running from US 180 at Palo Pinto to a road intersection at a distance of 3.6 miles (5.8 km). The highway was cancelled on February 6, 1953, with the mileage being transferred to FM 4.

=== FM 1193 (1953) ===
Farm to Market Road 1193
- Location: Jones and Taylor counties
- Existed: October 28, 1953–October 22, 1962

FM 1193 was designated a second time on October 28, 1953, running from US 380 at Avoca, southward to US 180, then southwestward to Nugent at a distance of 14.5 miles (23.3 km). The highway was extended 6.2 miles (10.0 km) to FM 1082 on September 29, 1954. FM 1193 was extended from FM 1082 to the then proposed location of I-20 at a distance of 9.5 miles (15.3 km) on October 31, 1957. The highway was cancelled on October 22, 1962, with the mileage being transferred to FM 600.

== FM 1194 ==
Farm to Market Road 1194
- Location: Angelina County
- Length: 5.948 mi (9.572 km)
- Existed: May 6, 1964–present

=== FM 1194 (1949) ===
Farm to Market Road 1194
- Location: Palo Pinto County
- Existed: July 14, 1949–October 7, 1955

The first route numbered FM 1194 was designated on July 14, 1949, From SH 254 west of Graford southward 4.3 miles (6.9 km) to a road intersection. On December 17, 1952, the road was extended southward 2.0 miles (3.2 km) across the Brazos River. FM 1194 was cancelled on October 7, 1955, and mileage was transferred to FM 4.

=== FM 1194 (1957) ===
Farm to Market Road 1194
- Location: Coke County
- Existed: October 31, 1957–December 5, 1958

The second route numbered FM 1194 was designated on October 31, 1957, from US 277 in Tennyson eastward 3.3 miles (5.3 km) to the Coke–Runnels county line. FM 1194 was cancelled on December 5, 1958, and mileage was transferred to FM 2333.

== FM 1195 ==
Farm to Market Road 1195
- Location: Palo Pinto County
- Length: 6.021 mi (9.690 km)
- Existed: 1949–present

Farm to Market Road 1195 (FM 1195) is located in Palo Pinto County. It runs from US 180 east of Mineral Wells south and west to US 281.

FM 1195 was designated on July 14, 1949, from US 180 east of Mineral Wells southeastward 3.9 miles (6.3 km) to a county road (current FM 3028). On February 28, 1958, the road was rerouted so that its north end was further east than where it originally was, shortening the length of the road to 3.7 miles (6.0 km). The old route of FM 1195 was originally planned to be removed from the state highway system upon completion of the new route, but the old route was kept in the state highway system as FM 1821 on January 25, 1959, but this did not take effect until construction on the new route was completed. On May 6, 1964, the road was extended west to US 281.

The entire route is in Palo Pinto County.

Location	mi	km	Destinations	Notes
Mineral Wells	0.0	0.0	US 180 – Mineral Wells, Weatherford	
Mineral Wells	2.3	3.7	FM 1821 – Mineral Wells Airport	
Mineral Wells	3.3	5.3	FM 3028 – Mineral Wells, Millsap	
	5.9	9.5	US 281 – Mineral Wells, Santo	
1.000 mi = 1.609 km; 1.000 km = 0.621 mi

== FM 1196 ==
Farm to Market Road 1196
- Location: San Augustine County
- Length: 6.806 mi (10.953 km)
- Existed: November 20, 1951–present

=== FM 1196 (1949) ===
Farm to Market Road 1196
- Location: Archer County
- Existed: July 14, 1949–October 9, 1951

A previous route numbered FM 1196 was designated on July 14, 1949, from SH 25 2.8 miles (4.5 km) west of Archer City westward 6.0 miles (9.7 km). FM 1196 was cancelled on October 9, 1951, and mileage was transferred to FM 374, which became part of FM 210 on December 10, 1953 (FM 374 has since been reassigned to another highway).

== FM 1197 ==
Farm to Market Road 1197
- Location: Clay County
- Length: 13.336 mi (21.462 km)
- Existed: 1949–present

Farm to Market Road 1197 (FM 1197) is located in Clay County.

The southern terminus of FM 1197 is at US 82 in downtown Henrietta, and the route travels north along North Bridge Street through the city, passing the rodeo grounds, city square, the Clay County Courthouse, and Henrietta Reservoir. After leaving Henrietta, the two-lane, shoulderless route crosses the Little Wichita River and passes through the farming areas of northern Clay County before ending at an intersection with FM 2332 northeast of Hurnville.

FM 1197 was first designated on July 14, 1949. Its original southern terminus was at an intersection with SH 148 north of Henrietta, while its northern terminus was 0.4 miles (0.64 km) south of Hurnville, making the road 8.2 miles (13.2 km). The southern terminus was relocated to US 82 within the city of Henrietta on December 18, 1950, making FM 1197 a true north–south route. While the southern terminus has remained unchanged, the route was extended at its other end several times: to 4.3 miles (6.9 km) north and east of the previous terminus on May 23, 1951, 10.5 miles (16.9 km) east to Stanfield on December 18, 1953, and then southward 5.1 miles (8.2 km) again on August 21, 1955. On November 21, 1956, FM 1197 was extended south to US 82, so that the route designation was such that it formed a complete loop with US 82, with its "northern" terminus, now at US 82; however, this extension was canceled October 31, 1957, with part of the extension being cancelled and the rest of the extension, not connecting to the end of FM 1197 before the extension, being renumbered FM 2535. On October 13, 1960, the route designation was truncated its current terminus at FM 2332, with the remainder of the route, as well as FM 2535, becoming part of that route.

Junction list

The entire route is in Clay County.

Location	mi	km	Destinations	Notes
Henrietta	0.0	0.0	US 82 – Wichita Falls, Nocona	Southern terminus
	4.9	7.9	FM 3392	
	13.3	21.4	FM 2332 – Petrolia, Stanfield	Northern terminus
1.000 mi = 1.609 km; 1.000 km = 0.621 mi

== FM 1198 ==
Farm to Market Road 1198
- Location: Cooke County
- Length: 10.652 mi (17.143 km)
- Existed: 1949–present

Farm to Market Road 1198 (FM 1198) is located in Cooke County. It runs from US 82 south to FM 922.

FM 1198 was designated on July 14, 1949, from US 82 to Myra. On May 2, 1962, the designation was extended south to FM 1630. On May 25, 1962, FM 1198 was extended south to a road intersection 2.8 miles (4.5 km) south of FM 1630, replacing FM 2649. On November 26, 1969, FM 1198 was extended south to its current terminus at FM 922.

== FM 1199 ==
Farm to Market Road 1199
- Location: Cooke County
- Length: 7.126 mi (11.468 km)
- Existed: 1949–present

Farm to Market Road 1199 (FM 1199) is located in Cooke County. It runs from a county road 6.2 miles (10.0 km) northwest of US 82 southward, eastward and northward through Lindsay to US 82 east of Lindsay.

FM 1199 was designated on July 14, 1949, from US 82 west of Lindsay through Lindsay to US 82 east of Lindsay. On May 7, 1974, FM 1199 was extended northward and westward 2.3 miles (3.7 km) to a county road. On May 25, 1976, FM 1199 was extended west and north 3.9 miles (6.3 km) to a county road northwest of Lindsay.
