= Blue dolphin =

Blue dolphin or Blue Dolphin may refer to:

- Blue Dolphin, a yacht and research vessel designed in 1926 by William Roue
- Blue Dolphin Energy Company, an American oil and natural gas company
- Blue Dolphin Enterprises, parent company of Pacific Comics, a former American comic book publisher
- Blue dolphin cichlid (Cyrtocara moorii), a fish endemic to Lake Malawi in east Africa
- Blue Dolphin and Blue Dolphin 2, ships operated by Tsugaru Kaikyō Ferry in Japan

== See also ==
- Island of the Blue Dolphins, a children's novel by Scott O'Dell which won the 1960 Newbery Medal
