= Nixon, Texas =

- City
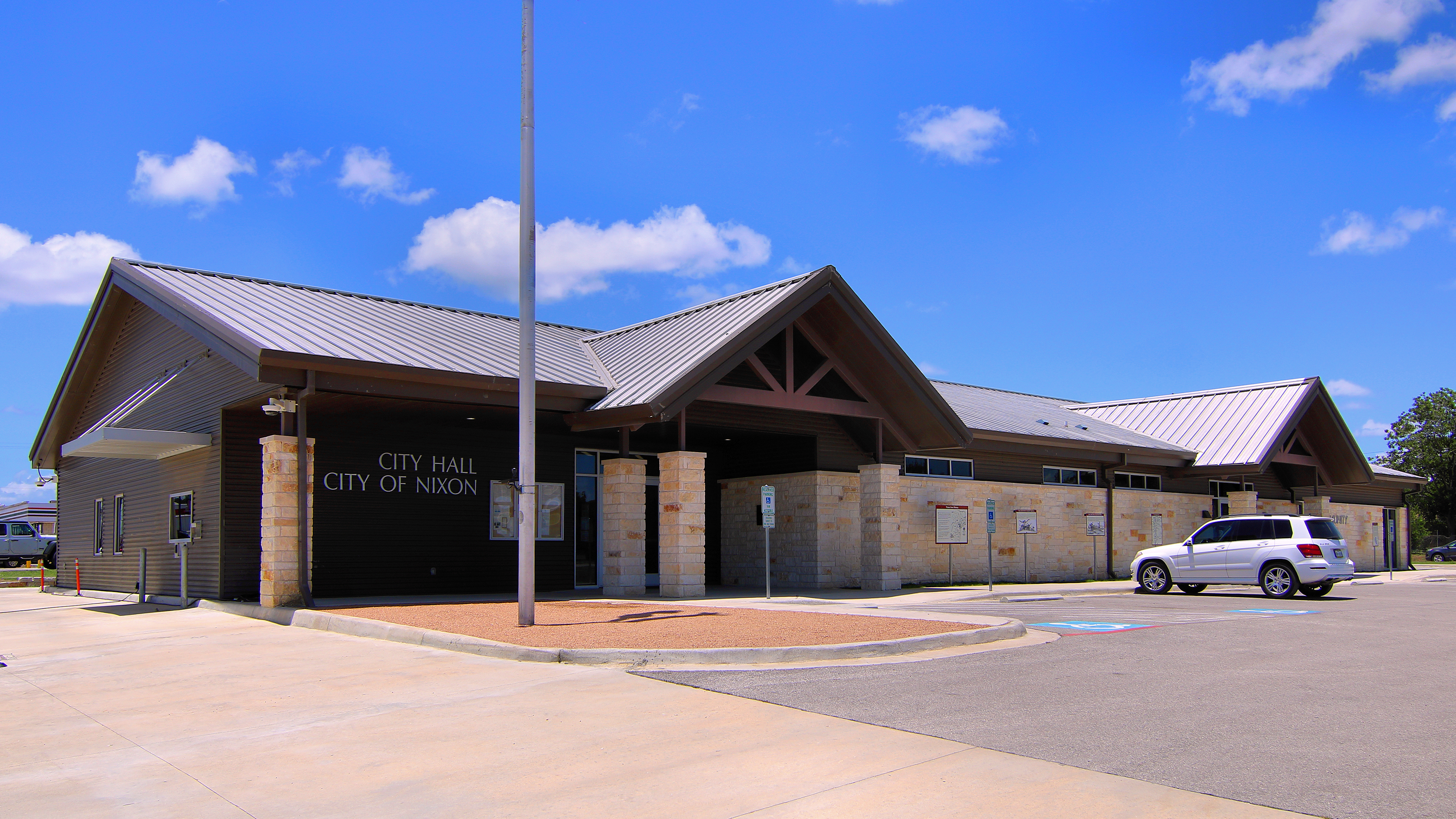
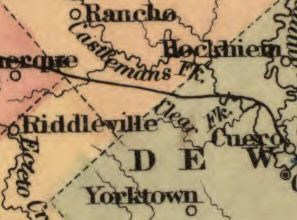
- Nixon-area, listed as "Rancho" and "Clear Fork" c. 1873. "Riddleville" is now Karnes City. Nixon City Hall shown above
- Coordinates: 29°16′11″N 97°45′57″W
- Country: United States
- State: Texas
- Counties: Gonzales, Wilson
- Settled: 1849 (Rancho)
- Founded: 1852 (R.T. Nixon Plantation)
- Incorporated: 1906 (John T. Nixon Tract)

Area
  - Total: 1.57 sq mi (4.06 km^{2})
  - Land: 1.56 sq mi (4.05 km^{2})
  - Water: 0.0039 sq mi (0.01 km^{2})
- Elevation: 387 ft (118 m)

Population (2020)
  - Total: 2,341
  - Density: 1,626.4/sq mi (627.94/km^{2})
- Time zone: UTC-6 (Central (CST))
  - Summer (DST): UTC-5 (CDT)
- ZIP code: 78140
- Area code: 830
- FIPS code: 48-51588
- GNIS feature ID: 2411257
- Website: nixon.texas.gov

Nixon is a city, self-described as a "compact neighborhood," at U.S. Highway 87 and the junction of Karnes, Gonzales and Wilson counties; alongside the Clear Fork Creek in the Juan J. Tejada League, in the U.S. state of Texas. Approaching 100 city blocks, the Nixon urban-area is defined by its schools at its north-end in the neighborhood of Rancho; with the southwest boundary hosting its industrial park and meat packing facilities, upon the 87-corridor towards Pandora and the county seat of Floresville.

The population was 2,341 at the 2020 census. Nixon is located primarily within Gonzales County; however, most of its major employers and assets are alongside the eastern Wilson County line. The city has a total area of 1.6 square miles (4.1 km^{2}), all land. The Wilson County portion of Nixon is part of the San Antonio metropolitan area.

Nixon was formed across the landholdings of the Nixon family through the end of the 19th century, beginning as a 14,000-acre (5,700 ha) plantation south of Luling and north of Belmont. In the early 20th century through the present day, Nixon continually consolidated southward at John T. Nixon's land closer to the original settlements of Cuero, Goliad and Indianola, once acting as a rail station; this confluence once having the original name of "Rancho," so named for its free-range cattle industry.

The city is served primarily by employers that include a publicly traded oil refinery, a chicken slaughterhouse, and its municipal services, especially the Nixon-Smiley Consolidated Independent School District. In 2018, the aggregate income of urban Nixon was an estimated $58,035,500. In 2019 according to the Texas Department of Transportation, the aggregate annual-average-daily-traffic (AADT) of urban Nixon was rated at 22,928 vehicles.

== Services ==
=== Holmes Foods ===
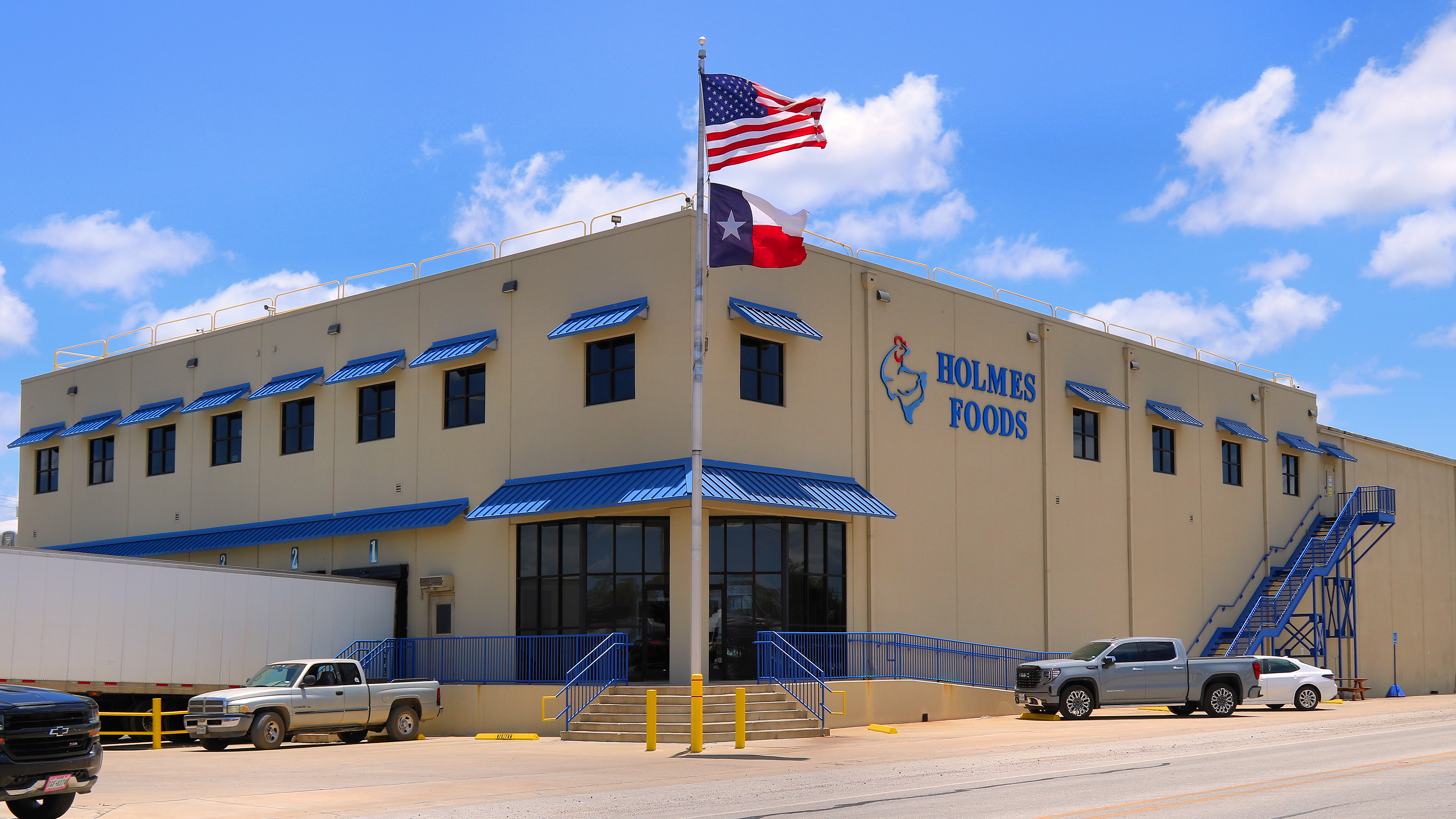
The Holmes Foods plant in Nixon

In 1925, near the Wilson County line of Nixon, Holmes Foods began as an ice plant that processed and slaughtered chickens across the street, eventually expanding to turkeys, "heavy hens," broilers and ducks.

As of 2010, ranking 30th out of 37 national "poultry integrators," the facility slaughtered 700,000 broiler chickens per week. During this time, 310 out of the "400+" facility employees processed these chickens into an "eight-piece cut," a major portion of the service offered by the facility.

This facility produces 50% of the local wastewater which is stored in three lagoons, later sprayed over half-a-mile of hay meadows for cattle ranching.

=== Blue Dolphin ===
Blue Dolphin Energy Company is a publicly traded Delaware corporation, headquartered in Houston, primarily engaged in the refining and marketing of petroleum products to be used as jet fuel, or as "a light sweet crude."

The company also provides tolling and storage terminaling services with 60 acres of assets located west of Nixon, Texas in eastern Wilson County, Texas. This includes a 15,000 bbl/d (2,400 m^{3}/d) crude distillation tower and more than 1.0 million barrels of petroleum storage tanks (collectively the “Nixon Facility”). Pipeline transportation and oil and gas operations are no longer active.

Since 2006 through 2014, according to the chief executive regarding this facility, in-kind with his other similar facility at the time, “...there were some issues with the EPA (Environmental Protection Agency) that we were not made aware of, and those issues have yet to be resolved.”

As of 2014, 45 workers were employed at this facility.

=== Recreational vehicle parks ===
The majority of the city's major arteries are zoned as "recreational vehicle parks," under a city-managed licensing program.

== History ==
The history of Nixon is defined by the dissolution and struggle of some of its major institutions.

=== Old Nixon ===
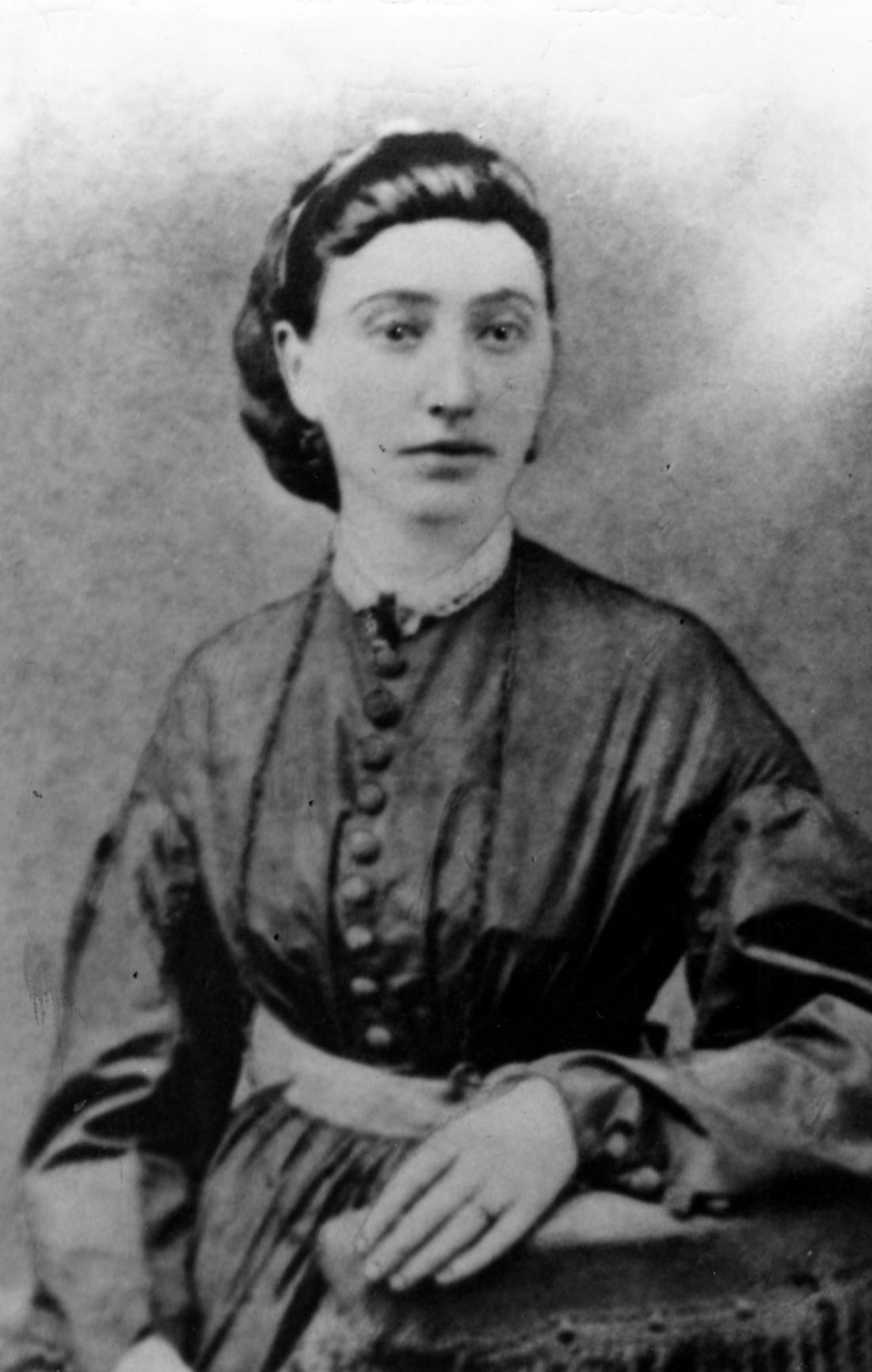
Fannie Andrews Nixon, wife of Old Nixon, Texas founder, Robert Thomas Nixon (1879); one of the first schoolteachers of the area

In 1852, Robert T. Nixon at the northern Gonzales—Guadalupe County line founded the original settlement of Nixon, now known as the ghost town "Old Nixon;" a former 14,000 acre plantation between Belmont-Luling.

The Old Nixon facility, despite being fenced at 14,000 acres at its precipice, began at an original capitalization of $800 for 400 acres of land; with no original "free land" grants of early Texas. During Juneteenth 1865, the plantation was not affected by the abolishment of slavery, as the plantation had no slaves. Cattle and horse-breeding were the primary occupations of this enterprise, the latter being featured in The Quarter Horse journal of July 1947; featuring the early 1900s, when the Old Nixon plantation under Dr. J.W. Nixon, hosted the first "Joe Bailey" Quarter Horse, a foremost founding sire of the breed.

In 1899, Old Nixon at Guadalupe County had a cotton gin (Nixon-family owned), two schools, a church, a blacksmith, several residences; alongside "Wagner's Store" and "Nixon and Stephens: Dealers in Dry Goods, Notions, Fine Groceries and General Merchandise." The latter was owned by W.H. Stephens and Sam Nixon. Robert T. Nixon's brother John T. Nixon lived at Rancho near what is now northern Nixon in southern Gonzales County. The name of Nixon was later taken from the former town and applied to the new town formed on John T. Nixon's land.

The only remaining establishment of the original Old Nixon settlement is its cemetery.

==== Rancho-Nixon ====
While Old Nixon was being founded, the settlement of Rancho grew at the northern boundary of present-Nixon and the country store of Paul Murray, on land he purchased in 1849. His store was located at the intersection of roads that led to the important settlements of San Antonio, Gonzales, Seguin, Cuero, Goliad and Indianola. Murray had come to Texas from Mississippi and was soon followed by many of his Mississippi neighbors. They came in search of farm land, but soon abandoned the plow to adopt the cowboy culture of the area, as unbranded range cattle were everywhere and free for the taking.

The name "Rancho" was the first name given to the developing Nixon settlement as a ranching culture developed. Some of the earliest open range branding codes in Texas originated here in 1866, as local stockmen were gathering cattle herds to be driven to northern markets by Rancho cowboys. These codes facilitated the system of marking and tracking the cattle that mingled together in open, unfenced ranges. A post office was officially established in 1855, and Rancho grew to have several businesses, as well as a school and two churches.

Rancho began a rapid decline in population when the Galveston, Harrisburg and San Antonio Railroad bypassed the town in 1906, and many residents relocated to the new railroad town of Nixon, two miles to the south. The post office closed in 1911, and by that time, many of Rancho's buildings had been moved to Nixon and most of Rancho's residents had relocated to the new town. Although virtually no visible evidence of the town of Rancho remains, the town's short existence stands as a reminder of the hundreds of similar towns that fell prey to the railroads that crossed Texas during the late 19th century.

==== Union-Nixon ====
Near the Wilson County—portion of Nixon, the town of Union or "Union Valley" had its postal services moved to Nixon in 1915. Settled before the American Civil War, the town had a population as high as 300 and several stores before its general consolidation into the Nixon community alongside FM 1681.

In 1947, the Union area had a nominal population of 50, with 22 reported in 1990 through 2000.

=== Urban Nixon ===
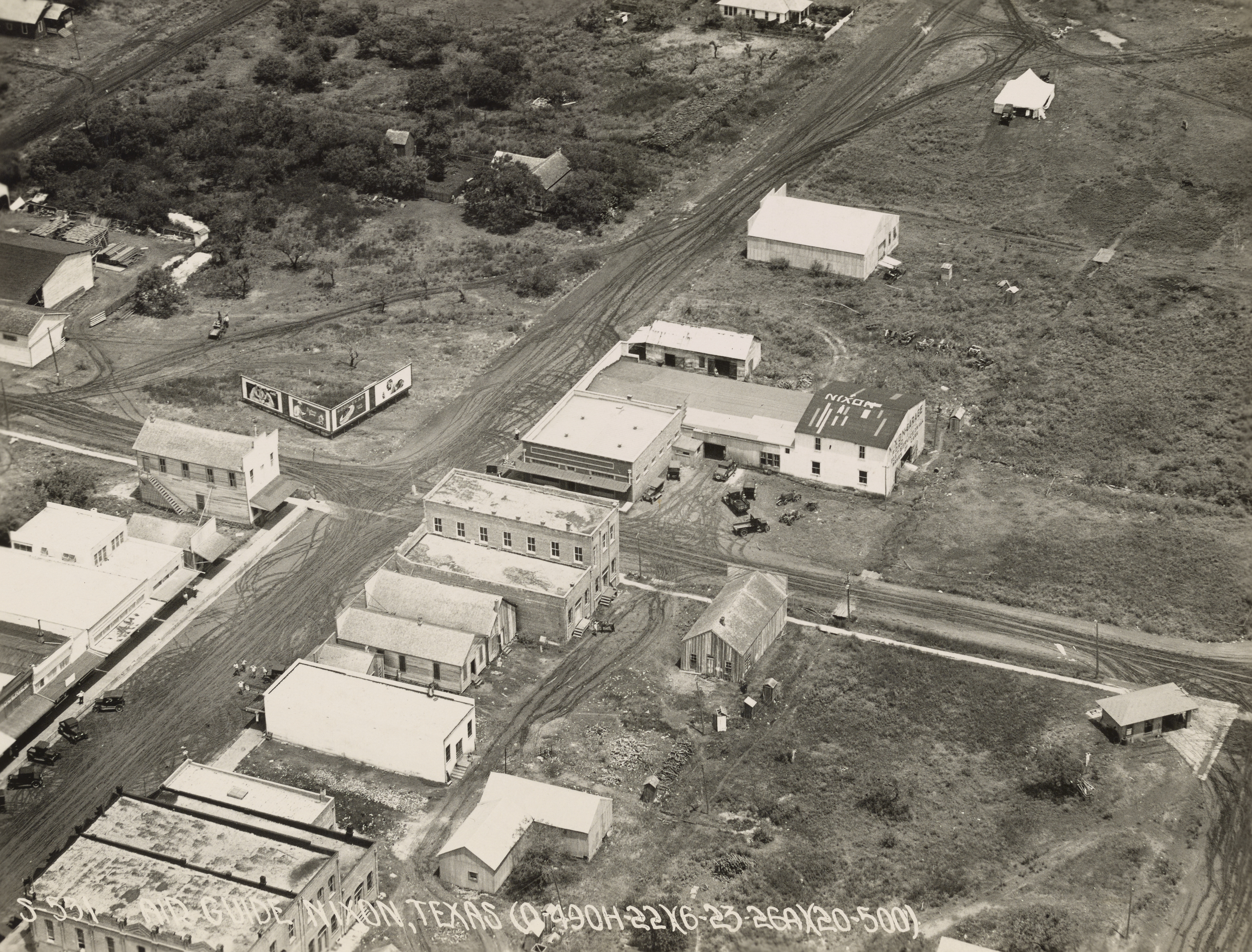
Nixon in 1926

Nixon as an urban development began in 1869, at the site of its First Baptist Church within its 100-block grid on Texas Avenue, near Wilson County. The San Antonio Baptist Association established a local mission here under Reverend T. Christmas and Reverend J.F. Hines.

The congregation had established a sanctuary one-mile north in Rancho, and consolidated it into the Nixon congregation upon the city's incorporation in 1907. In 1921, they began to partner with the congregation in Leakey, Texas, west of San Antonio.

The Nixon First Baptist Church is considered an original cultural founder of the community.

==== Nixon News ====
In the early 20th century, Nixon had a local newspaper titled Nixon News. It was forced to cease publication in September 1921. The editor cited reasons ranging from a lack of advertisement in the paper, lack of support from local businesses and apathy from the general community. The Daily Advocate newspaper of Victoria, Texas, during this period, suggested that the downscaling of another significant Texan paper was a related trend.

The trade-name of the paper returned as early as 1980 through 1986, serving as an executive over three annual city festivals; celebrating Nixon's overall production of a broad-range of poultry products and byproducts, purportedly the highest in the State of Texas at that time. At present Nixon News is, again, no longer published but was considered award-winning in "Community Service" by the Texas Press Association in 1980.

Through 2013 until 2017, the trade-named resumed its most recent operation as an online newspaper titled “The Nixon News” with publications on local politics. This third-iteration of the publication is no longer published as well.

==== Nixon intersection ====
Since approximately 2015, the Nixon intersection of U.S. Highway 87 and Texas State Highway 80 has been marked by the Texas Department of Transportation having to hire and replace multiple contractors, after continual delay to install traffic signals over three-and-a-half years; an installation that would normally be a "routine upgrade." The Nixon City Manager hypothesized the delays began with a first contractor "not working in a timely manner." After a first contractor, time was consumed by an initial six-month delay, another set of construction bids and years of replacement of prior work.

==== COVID-19 ====
In late March 2020, the first confirmed case of COVID-19 in Gonzales County was discovered in Nixon.

== Demographics ==
Historical population
Census	Pop.	Note	%±
1920	1,124		—
1930	1,037		−7.7%
1940	1,835		77.0%
1950	1,875		2.2%
1960	1,751		−6.6%
1970	1,925		9.9%
1980	2,008		4.3%
1990	1,995		−0.6%
2000	2,186		9.6%
2010	2,385		9.1%
2020	2,341		−1.8%
U.S. Decennial Census

=== 2020 census ===
As of the 2020 census, there were 2,341 people, 786 households, and 484 families residing in the city. The median age was 31.0 years; 31.6% of residents were under the age of 18 and 10.3% of residents were 65 years of age or older. For every 100 females there were 102.5 males, and for every 100 females age 18 and over there were 98.8 males age 18 and over.

There were 786 households in Nixon, of which 45.8% had children under the age of 18 living in them. Of all households, 41.2% were married-couple households, 21.6% were households with a male householder and no spouse or partner present, and 29.3% were households with a female householder and no spouse or partner present. About 25.2% of all households were made up of individuals and 8.7% had someone living alone who was 65 years of age or older.

There were 962 housing units, of which 18.3% were vacant. The homeowner vacancy rate was 0.8% and the rental vacancy rate was 9.1%.

0.0% of residents lived in urban areas, while 100.0% lived in rural areas.

Racial composition as of the 2020 census
Race	Number	Percent
White	1,333	56.9%
Black or African American	60	2.6%
American Indian and Alaska Native	10	0.4%
Asian	9	0.4%
Native Hawaiian and Other Pacific Islander	0	0.0%
Some other race	502	21.4%
Two or more races	427	18.2%
Hispanic or Latino (of any race)	1,914	81.8%

=== 2000 census ===
As of the census of 2000, there were 2,186 people, 686 households, and 506 families residing in the city. The population density was 1,928.1 inhabitants per square mile (744.4/km^{2}). There were 803 housing units at an average density of 708.3 per square mile (273.5/km^{2}). The racial makeup of the city was 69.99% White, 2.84% African American, 0.91% Native American, 0.09% Asian, 24.15% from other races, and 2.01% from two or more races. Hispanic or Latino of any race were 61.57% of the population.

There were 686 households, out of which 42.1% had children under the age of 18 living with them, 48.0% were married couples living together, 17.2% had a female householder with no husband present, and 26.2% were non-families. 24.1% of all households were made up of individuals, and 13.3% had someone living alone who was 65 years of age or older. The average household size was 3.02 and the average family size was 3.53.

In the city, the population was spread out, with 31.5% under the age of 18, 10.8% from 18 to 24, 26.7% from 25 to 44, 16.2% from 45 to 64, and 14.7% who were 65 years of age or older. The median age was 31 years. For every 100 females, there were 94.8 males. For every 100 females age 18 and over, there were 89.5 males.

The median income for a household in the city was $22,104, and the median income for a family was $25,139. Males had a median income of $21,250 versus $15,491 for females. The per capita income for the city was $10,135. About 22.3% of families and 27.5% of the population were below the poverty line, including 37.7% of those under age 18 and 25.0% of those age 65 or over.

== Climate ==
According to the Köppen Climate Classification system, Nixon has a humid subtropical climate, abbreviated "Cfa" on climate maps. The hottest temperature recorded in Nixon was 113 °F (45.0 °C) on July 26, 1954, while the coldest temperature recorded was 1 °F (−17.2 °C) on December 24, 1989.

Climate data for Nixon, Texas, 1991–2020 normals, extremes 1948–present
Month	Jan	Feb	Mar	Apr	May	Jun	Jul	Aug	Sep	Oct	Nov	Dec	Year
Record high °F (°C)	90 (32)	95 (35)	100 (38)	101 (38)	103 (39)	110 (43)	113 (45)	109 (43)	112 (44)	99 (37)	92 (33)	88 (31)	113 (45)
Mean maximum °F (°C)	79.6 (26.4)	83.1 (28.4)	87.1 (30.6)	90.9 (32.7)	93.6 (34.2)	98.4 (36.9)	100.2 (37.9)	101.5 (38.6)	98.8 (37.1)	93.4 (34.1)	86.0 (30.0)	81.1 (27.3)	103.3 (39.6)
Mean daily maximum °F (°C)	64.8 (18.2)	68.1 (20.1)	74.2 (23.4)	81.0 (27.2)	87.2 (30.7)	93.1 (33.9)	95.3 (35.2)	97.4 (36.3)	91.4 (33.0)	83.8 (28.8)	73.6 (23.1)	65.9 (18.8)	81.3 (27.4)
Daily mean °F (°C)	51.4 (10.8)	55.3 (12.9)	61.8 (16.6)	68.3 (20.2)	75.8 (24.3)	81.7 (27.6)	83.6 (28.7)	84.5 (29.2)	78.9 (26.1)	70.4 (21.3)	60.6 (15.9)	53.3 (11.8)	68.8 (20.5)
Mean daily minimum °F (°C)	38.3 (3.5)	42.5 (5.8)	49.3 (9.6)	55.7 (13.2)	64.5 (18.1)	70.2 (21.2)	72.0 (22.2)	71.6 (22.0)	66.5 (19.2)	57.1 (13.9)	47.7 (8.7)	40.8 (4.9)	56.4 (13.5)
Mean minimum °F (°C)	25.2 (−3.8)	29.3 (−1.5)	32.4 (0.2)	40.3 (4.6)	51.3 (10.7)	64.0 (17.8)	67.8 (19.9)	67.3 (19.6)	55.5 (13.1)	40.4 (4.7)	31.2 (−0.4)	26.3 (−3.2)	23.0 (−5.0)
Record low °F (°C)	3 (−16)	5 (−15)	22 (−6)	29 (−2)	39 (4)	54 (12)	56 (13)	57 (14)	43 (6)	27 (−3)	21 (−6)	1 (−17)	1 (−17)
Average precipitation inches (mm)	2.11 (54)	2.21 (56)	2.70 (69)	3.08 (78)	4.36 (111)	3.60 (91)	2.45 (62)	3.14 (80)	2.98 (76)	3.16 (80)	2.19 (56)	2.41 (61)	34.39 (874)
Average snowfall inches (cm)	0.0 (0.0)	0.0 (0.0)	0.0 (0.0)	0.0 (0.0)	0.0 (0.0)	0.0 (0.0)	0.0 (0.0)	0.0 (0.0)	0.0 (0.0)	0.0 (0.0)	0.0 (0.0)	0.1 (0.25)	0.1 (0.25)
Average precipitation days (≥ 0.01 in)	7.3	6.4	6.2	5.3	6.5	5.8	3.9	4.1	5.4	4.7	5.7	5.8	67.1
Average snowy days (≥ 0.1 in)	0.0	0.0	0.0	0.0	0.0	0.0	0.0	0.0	0.0	0.0	0.0	0.0	0.0
Source 1: NOAA
Source 2: National Weather Service

== Culture ==
The Nixon area is primarily served by the journals of record Wilson County News newspaper of Floresville and The Gonzales Inquirer newspaper of Gonzales.

=== Crime ===
In 2013, Kenneth Johnson of Nixon confessed to sexually assaulting two girls, ages 13 and 14, after a witness told Nixon police he saw Johnson rape an intoxicated teenager at a Nixon residence. He was African-American.

In 2018, 15-foot-long bleachers were stolen from the Nixon Little League baseball field; they were taken by truck in an act lasting three minutes.

In 2019, Nixon experienced significant acts of burglary and car theft, as well as issues of drugs and child-abuse being described as "most distinguishable."

==== Operation Torch ====
In early 2020, the Texas Department of Public Safety Criminal Investigations Division and the Nixon Police Department targeted the sale of crystal meth in the Gonzales—Wilson County area, under the name Operation Torch. A significant number of arrest warrants were served in the Nixon-Pandora-Stockdale-Smiley municipal-area. The investigation began with analysis of the local impact of meth distribution in Nixon, eventually uncovering a "drug network of distributors." Five of the targeted subjects, fifteen in total, were from the Nixon area. During this time period, eleven arrests were made, with four remaining at-large.

==== Texas Sheltered Care ====
In 2007, a former private facility in Nixon, "Texas Sheltered Care", that held children caught illegally crossing the US-Mexico border, was ordered closed due to allegations of sexual abuse. It operated under contract of the federal government's Department of Health and Human Services. Its 72 residents were sent to other shelters outside of Nixon, due to a lack of confidence of being able to reopen in the city. Immigration lawyers were forced to abandon their Nixon practices that served the detainees in the facility. The FBI and local authorities investigated the alleged incidents, with an accused staff member fired. The accused was later criminally charged and sentenced to prison.

== Notable people ==
- Little Joe, Tejano singer
- Andre Marrou, 1992 Libertarian Party presidential nominee
- Chris Marrou, former news anchor for KENS 5-TV in San Antonio
- Carlton McKinney, retired professional basketball player

=== Manuel Zepeda ===
In 2018, former Nixon city manager and local substitute teacher, Manuel Zepeda, was charged with 11 sexual felonies against children.

=== Auvye Trammel ===
In 2011, former Nixon councilman Auvye Trammel, having once served 21 years on the city council through two terms, was sentenced to 18 months in federal prison for connections with drug trafficking marijuana from Mexico; Trammel had posted bail for a known trafficker. He had also been prior charged for a chase involving the trafficker.

The then-current Nixon police chief was fired during the trafficking investigation just prior to Trammel's arrest; the former chief cites reasons of retaliation for investigating the then-councilman, while the city claims he failed to meet occupational standards.
