= Blue Dolphin Energy Company =

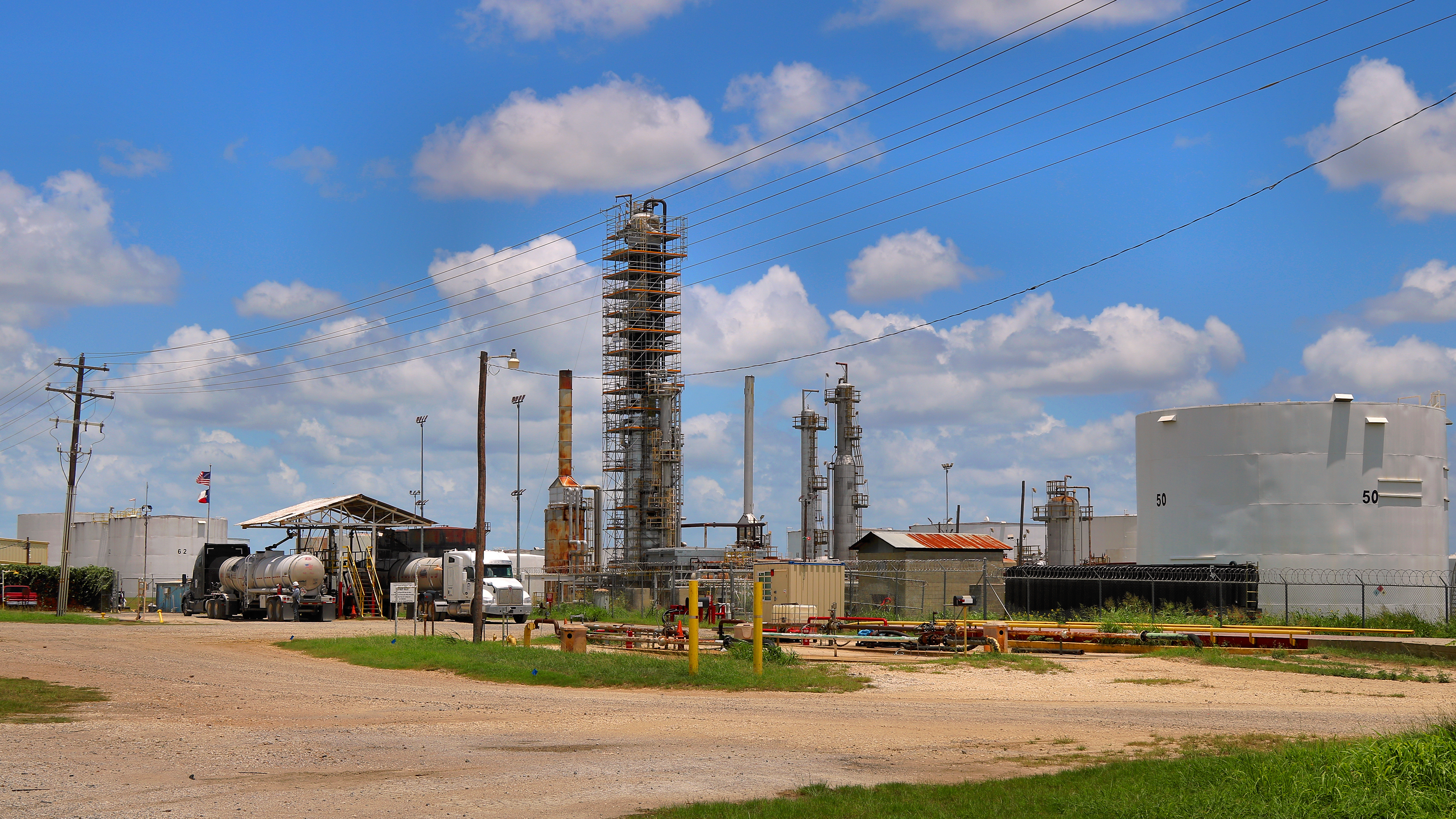
- The Blue Dolphin Energy Company refinery and depot west of Nixon, Texas.
- Company type: Public
- Traded as: OTCQX: BDCO
- Headquarters: Houston, Texas, U.S.
- Key people: Jonathan P. Carroll (CEO); Jonathan P. Carroll (president)
- Website: Official website

Blue Dolphin Energy Company is a publicly traded Delaware corporation, headquartered in Houston, primarily engaged in the refining and marketing of petroleum products to be used as jet fuel, or as "a light sweet crude."

The company also provides tolling and storage terminaling services with 60 acres of assets located west of Nixon, Texas in eastern Wilson County, Texas. This includes a 15,000 bbl/d (2,400 m^{3}/d) crude distillation tower and more than 1.0 million barrels of petroleum storage tanks (collectively the “Nixon Facility”). Pipeline transportation and oil and gas operations are no longer active.

Since 2006 through 2014, according to the chief executive regarding this facility, in-kind with his other similar facility at the time, “...there were some issues with the EPA (Environmental Protection Agency) that we were not made aware of, and those issues have yet to be resolved.”

As of 2014, 45 workers were employed at this facility.
