= Alma, Texas =

- Town
- Interactive map of Alma, Texas
- Coordinates: 32°16′51″N 96°32′58″W
- Country: United States
- State: Texas
- County: Ellis

Area
  - Total: 5.19 sq mi (13.43 km^{2})
  - Land: 5.17 sq mi (13.39 km^{2})
  - Water: 0.015 sq mi (0.04 km^{2})
- Elevation: 459 ft (140 m)

Population (2020)
  - Total: 373
  - Density: 72.2/sq mi (27.86/km^{2})
- Time zone: UTC-6 (Central (CST))
  - Summer (DST): UTC-5 (CDT)
- Area codes: 214, 469, 945, 972
- FIPS code: 48-02044
- GNIS feature ID: 2412351
- Website: cityofalmatx.gov

Alma is a town in Ellis County, Texas, United States. The population was 373 at the 2020 census.

== Geography ==
Alma is located on Interstate 45, approximately 5 miles (8.0 km) southeast of Ennis and 15 miles (24 km) north of Corsicana.

According to the United States Census Bureau, the town has a total area of 5.2 square miles (13.4 km^{2}), of which 0.02 square miles (0.04 km^{2}), or 0.3%, is water.

== Demographics ==
Historical population
Census	Pop.	Note	%±
1980	171		—
1990	205		19.9%
2000	302		47.3%
2010	331		9.6%
2020	373		12.7%
U.S. Decennial Census

As of the census of 2000, there were 302 people, 107 households, and 83 families residing in the town. The population density was 60.0 inhabitants per square mile (23.2/km^{2}). There were 114 housing units at an average density of 22.7 per square mile (8.8/km^{2}). The racial makeup of the town was 91.06% White, 3.64% African American, 5.30% from other races. Hispanic or Latino of any race were 5.96% of the population.

There were 107 households, out of which 37.4% had children under the age of 18 living with them, 67.3% were married couples living together, 8.4% had a female householder with no husband present, and 21.5% were non-families. 19.6% of all households were made up of individuals, and 7.5% had someone living alone who was 65 years of age or older. The average household size was 2.82 and the average family size was 3.23.

In the town, the population was spread out, with 28.5% under the age of 18, 8.6% from 18 to 24, 27.8% from 25 to 44, 23.8% from 45 to 64, and 11.3% who were 65 years of age or older. The median age was 38 years. For every 100 females, there were 92.4 males. For every 100 females age 18 and over, there were 91.2 males.

The median income for a household in the town was $46,250, and the median income for a family was $57,500. Males had a median income of $37,500 versus $14,205 for females. The per capita income for the town was $14,947. About 3.7% of families and 7.6% of the population were below the poverty line, including 9.3% of those under the age of eighteen and 8.3% of those sixty five or over.

The town of Alma has the lowest property taxes allowed by law.

== Education ==
The town of Alma is served by the Ennis Independent School District.
