= Pandora, Texas =

Unincorporated community in Texas, US

Coordinates: 29°15′00″N 97°50′19″W

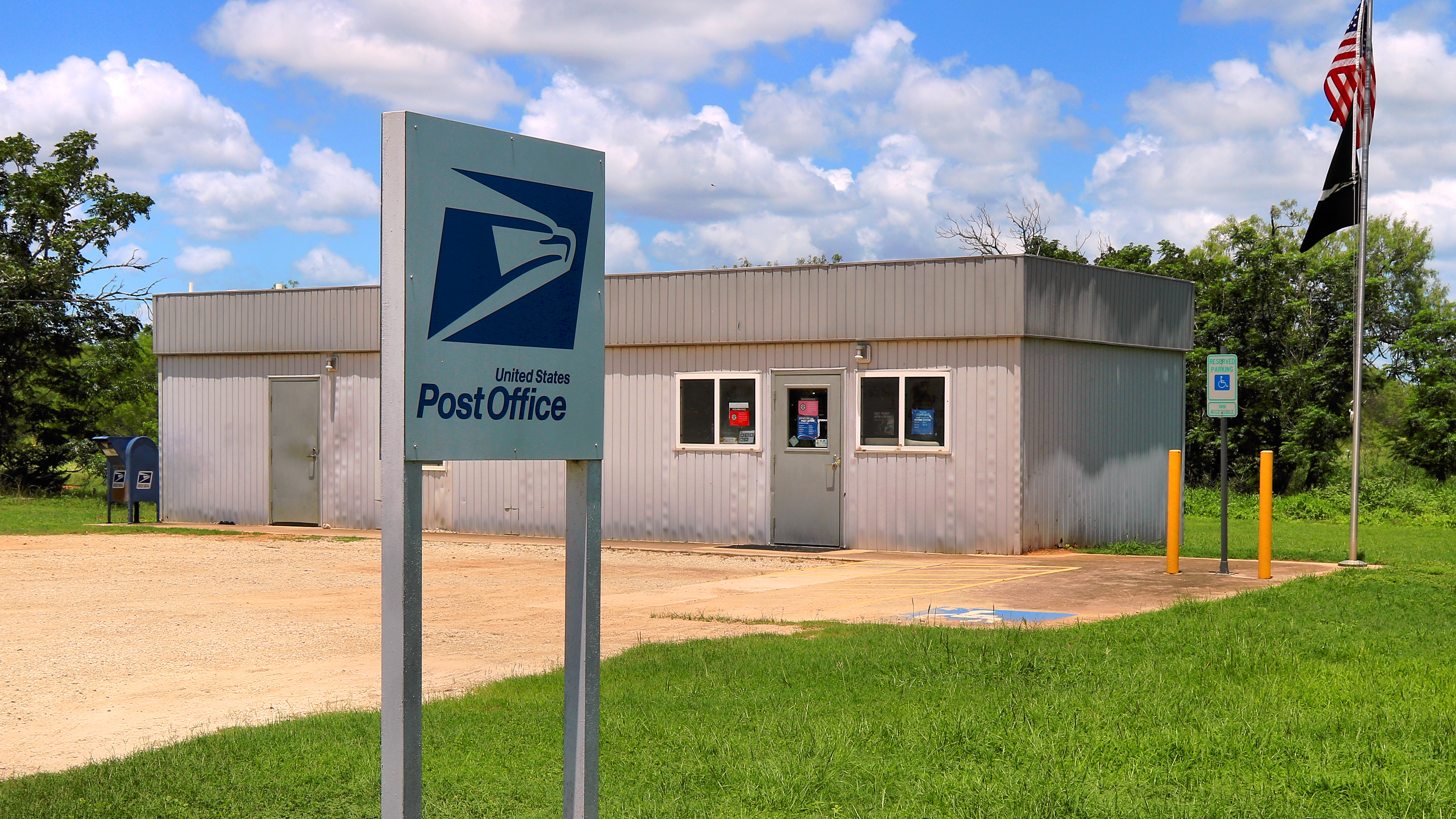
The United States Post Office in Pandora.

Pandora is an unincorporated community in Wilson County, Texas, United States. According to the Handbook of Texas, the community had an estimated population of 125 in 2000. Pandora is part of the San Antonio metropolitan area.

It is located at the junction of U.S. Highway 87 and FM 1107 in eastern Wilson County. This is approximately 20 miles (32 km) northeast of Floresville and 46 miles (74 km) southeast of Downtown San Antonio. Pandora has a post office, with the ZIP code 78143.
