= Artesia Wells, Texas =

Unincorporated community in Texas, US

Coordinates: 28°16′48″N 99°17′04″W

Artesia Wells is an unincorporated community and populated place in La Salle County, Texas, United States. According to the Handbook of Texas, the community had an estimated population of 35 in 2000.

Artesia Wells is located at the junction of Interstate 35 and FM 133 in western La Salle County, approximately seven miles south of Cotulla.

Public education in the community is provided by the Cotulla Independent School District.
