= Los Angeles, La Salle County, Texas =

Unincorporated community in Texas, US

Coordinates: 28°27′57″N 99°00′00″W

Los Angeles is an unincorporated community and populated place in La Salle County, Texas, United States. According to the Handbook of Texas, the community had an estimated population of 563 as of the 2020 census and a population of 20 in 2000.

Los Angeles is located along State Highway 97 in north-central La Salle County, about 13 miles east of Cotulla. Public education in the community is provided by the Cotulla Independent School District.

The community adopted the name "Los Angeles" as a promotional stunt in 1923 in reference to the much larger city in California.
