= Hailey Kinsel =

American barrel racer

- Occupation: Rodeo competitor
- Discipline: Barrel racing
- Born: October 3, 1994 (age 32); Cotulla, Texas, US
- Major wins/Championships: 2018, 2019, 2020, and 2022 Women's Professional Rodeo Association World Champion barrel racer

Significant horses
- DM Sissy Hayday "Sister"; Thunder Stones "TJ"

Hailey Kinsel (born October 3, 1994), is an American professional rodeo cowgirl who specializes in barrel racing and competes in the Women's Professional Rodeo Association (WPRA). She won the WPRA barrel-racing world championship in 2018, 2019, 2020, and 2022 at the National Finals Rodeo (NFR). She has also won the NFR Average title once in 2020. Kinsel and her horses have qualified for the NFR nine consecutive times in her years in professional rodeo from 2017 through 2025. She has been competing in rodeo since adolescence, winning awards through high school and college in both barrel racing and breakaway roping, as well as professional rodeo. Her horse, Sister, won the Barrel Racing Horse of the Year Award in 2018 and 2025.

== Early life ==
Hailey Kinsel was born on October 3, 1994. She grew up in Cotulla, Texas, with her parents Dan and Leslie Kinsel (née Walker). Her mother, who has an equestrian background, is a former Miss Rodeo Texas in 1980. Her parents own a commercial beef cattle ranch, and were instrumental in fostering her interest in rodeo and horses because they both had rodeo backgrounds. They enabled her and her brother to compete in horse and other sports in addition to academic and livestock events. Kinsel initially preferred to compete as a gymnast. When she turned 11, she became more interested in barrel racing and rodeo.

== Career ==
At 13, Kinsel received her first dedicated barrel horse, who "couldn't be used on the ranch". As Kinsel says, "Josey was off the track, and she was one that mom and I kind of brought along together." Kinsel competed with Josey in junior high school and high school, but stopped when the mare became injured. Kinsel then competed on a gelding named Thunder Stones, nicknamed TJ, throughout college rodeo. She also had TJ when she filled her professional permit for the Women's Professional Rodeo Association (WPRA).

Kinsel and her mother bought her current barrel racing horse DM Sissy Hayday "Sister" as a filly. Sister was one of many horses they bought young and trained, while they used others to fill gaps. Sister was one they trained from the ground up. Sister was sired by Sherry Cervi's PC Frenchman's Hayday, nicknamed Dinero. "We bought her because we had an older half sister to her out of a Royal Shake Em mare that we just loved. We tried to find that lineage and follow that bloodline and thought, 'Well, if she's crossed with Dinero, this could be good", said Kinsel.

Kinsel turned professional by joining the WPRA in 2015. Barrel racing and breakaway roping are sanctioned by the WPRA, while the other rodeo events, for male contestants, are sanctioned by the Professional Rodeo Cowboys Association (PRCA). All of the championship rodeo events are held together at the National Finals Rodeo (NFR) at the Thomas & Mack Center, in Las Vegas, Nevada, in December. The exception is steer roping which has its own finals event at the National Finals Steer Roping (NFSR). In July 2017 at the Days of '47 Rodeo, she cinched her first qualification to the NFR. She won the American Rodeo in 2017, came in second in 2018, won in 2019, and again in 2021.

== 2015 and 2016 seasons ==
In 2015, Kinsel finished ranked 19th in the WPRA Rookie of the Year standings with $4,880.

In 2016, she won the Elizabeth Stampede in Colorado, the Longview PRCA Rodeo in Texas, the Crockett Lions Club PRCA Rodeo in Texas, and the Hugo PRCA Rodeo in Oklahoma.

== 2017 season ==
The Kinsel family bought Sister at the age of two while Kinsel was in her college freshman year; she and her mother took turns riding her. They experienced issues training Sister, but the mare also had some natural abilities. They waited until Sister was five years old to start her in futurity competition. Her second year running barrels was 2017 and was Kinsel's first year qualifying for the NFR. In the mare's first 14 months of competition, she won $35,000. Kinsel jockeyed Sister to her first professional rodeo win in Elizabeth, Colorado, in 2016 and her win in Denver, Colorado, in the 2017 season.

Kinsel won a gold medal at the Days of '47 Rodeo in Salt Lake City, Utah, and won the West of the Pecos Rodeo in Texas. She finished in second place at the Tri-State Fair and Rodeo in Amarillo, Texas, the Dinosaur Days Rodeo in Vernal, Utah, the Guymon Pioneer Days Rodeo in Oklahoma, and the San Patricio County PRCA Rodeo in Sinton, Texas, and tied for second place at the National Western Stock Show and Rodeo in Denver. Other than barrel racing, she also competed at the 2017 WPRA World Finals in breakaway roping.

Starting with the preliminary rounds in February, Kinsel competed at the "world's richest one-day rodeo," the American Rodeo, for the first time. The rodeo is held in Arlington, Texas, at the AT&T Stadium. In the semi-finals, Kinsel and Sister scored a time of 14.08 seconds to win and move on to the second round of semi-finals on Thursday.

Kinsel and Sister won the semi-finals and advanced to the finals on Sunday, February 19, where the possible finals prize was $1 million. Kinsel needed a clean run to take second place, but she and Sister went all out and won first, despite taking risks. Kinsel won her event with a time of 14.4 seconds in the long round, and moved in the top four for the short round. She and Sister scored a time of 14.689 in the short round to win the event and also the top time of the event. Three competitors from three different events split the million-dollar prize. Kinsel, Cody DeMoss, and Sage Kimzey each received $333,333.33 from what is called the side pot, as well as $100,000 for winning their respective events. The three participants each won $433,333.33 that day.

Kinsel had qualified for the American Rodeo at the Better Barrel Races Regional (BBR) Qualifier in Glen Rose in November 2016. Due to that qualification, Kinsel became the first BBR/The American Qualifier to split the $1 million payout. Because Kinsel holds a BBR membership, her total winnings for $433,333.33 is a world record for members. "I didn't wear the right mascara for this", said Kinsel after her win. "God is good, and my horse is awesome." Sister helped Kinsel win almost $500,000 in the last couple of months leading up to and including the American.

=== National Finals Rodeo ===
Kinsel qualified for her first NFR in the seventh position in the world standings to make the top 15 competitors who qualify for the trip to the finals in December at the Thomas & Mack Center in Las Vegas, Nevada. She finished second in the world standings to become the reserve barrel racing world champion after 10 days of 10 go-rounds in the NFR. Kinsel set a new arena record in the third go-round with a time of 13.11 seconds. She set a new NFR earnings record by winning $189,385 in barrel racing over the entire 10 days of competition. She placed sixth in the NFR Average by winning four rounds out of 10 total and placing in 8 out of the 10 rounds. In only two of the 10 rounds, Kinsel finished out of the money due to knocking over a barrel, yet still was the high money earner.

== 2018 season ==
In February, Kinsel competed at the AT&T Center, in the San Antonio Stock Show and Rodeo in Texas. Kinsel and Sister swept Bracket 1 to start the semifinals as the high money winners and finish as the same. They won $7,134 in their bracket. The first round of the semifinals she won $2,230. When they competed on Wednesday night, their run was almost perfect, garnering them a time of 13.60 seconds. They broke the arena record of 13.67 seconds set by Sydni Blanchard in 2013. Kinsel said it was special because she grew up attending this rodeo, which is near her childhood home.

She won the Sanders County Fair and PRCA Rodeo in Plains, Montana, the Fallon County Fair and Rodeo in Baker, Montana, That Famous Preston Night Rodeo in Idaho, the Home of Champions Rodeo in Red Lodge, Montana, the Black Hills Roundup in Belle Fourche, South Dakota, the West of the Pecos Rodeo in Texas, and the Clovis Rodeo in California. She finished second at RodeoHouston and the Fort Worth Stock Show and Rodeo. She had a big win at Calgary Stampede in Calgary, Alberta, Canada, of $121,000, for which only $71,000 counted towards the World Standings. She also won the Days of '47 Cowboy Games and Rodeo in Salt Lake City, Utah, winning $53,200, although none of that counts to ProRodeo standings since that rodeo is not sanctioned by the WPRA. Kinsel won this rodeo two years consecutively.

This season, Sister earned more than $1 million in her career, including significant money for winning both the Calgary Stampede and the Days of '47 Rodeo. Kinsel said about Sister, "She really is that fast and that athletic, and I can't take credit for that. Some horses just have it, and she has that 'it' factor."

=== 2018 National Finals Rodeo ===
At the 60th NFR on Saturday, December 15, in Las Vegas, Kinsel won her first barrel racing world championship. She and NFR Average winner Carman Pozzobon accepted their gold buckles and saddles in front of an audience of 17,150 in the stadium that evening. Kinsel finished the 10-day competition with a WPRA record $350,700 in season earnings. "Oh man, it was amazing," she said. "Everyone up there is so deserving, and they're heroes of mine. It was definitely surreal and was pretty awesome."

Kinsel had the title locked up after new nine rounds. "We had (the world championship) won, and I could have run (Sister) to try for that Top Gun deal, but she owes me nothing", Kinsel said. "We accomplished our main goal, and we are getting ready for 2019. So, she had the night off and I ran my backup horse, TJ. He proved that he deserves to be here, too." Kinsel's seventh-place finish in the NFR Average earned her $11,423. Kinsel's total winnings of $350,699.83 also outdistanced second-place finisher Jessica Routier's total winnings of $251,704.23 for the championship.

== 2019 season ==
She won the Sioux Falls Premier Rodeo in Sioux Falls, South Dakota, the Pioneer Days Rodeo in Utah, and the Old Fort Days Rodeo in Fort Smith, Arkansas. She won the San Antonio Stock Show and Rodeo in San Antonio, Texas, for a second time. She won the Fort Worth Stock Show and Rodeo in Texas. She came in second at the Hugo PRCA Rodeo in Oklahoma. She also took second place at the Annual Cowboy Capital of the World PRCA Rodeo in Stephenville, Texas. Kinsel also won her second the American Rodeo championship.

In July, Kinsel competed at the historic Calgary Stampede in Calgary, Alberta, Canada. Kinsel took first place in the Ladies Barrel Racing event on Tuesday, July 9. When she finished her winning run, the clock confirmed that she had matched the arena record, which is 16.99 seconds.

=== 2019 National Finals Rodeo ===
When Kinsel finished her 2019 season, she was ranked second in the world standings. At the NFR in Las Vegas, she won NFR rounds 7 and 8 and placed in five other rounds. Kinsel and her horse Sister won the World Barrel Racing Championship for the second time. Kinsel finished 8th in the Average. With her championship win this season, she became the first barrel racer to win back-to-back titles after Kelly Kaminski did it during the 2004 to 2005 seasons. Kinsel earned a total of $290,020 for her entire season.

== 2020 season ==
Kinsel and her horse, Sister, ran the fastest time of the Dodge City, Kansas, rodeo. That day, they also set a new WPRA rodeo record for a standard barrel racing pattern with a time of 16.63 seconds. They also came in second in the average. Kinsel earned $7,831 in Dodge City.

Kinsel finished in second place at the Mineral Wells PRCA Rodeo in Texas. She won Nebraska's Big Rodeo in Burwell, and the Iowa Championship Rodeo in Sidney. Kinsel set a new arena record time of 16.90 seconds on Sister at the Lawton Rangers Rodeo in Lawton, Oklahoma. Lastly, she earned $4,926 at Lawton. She also earned $23,200 at the Fort Worth Stock Show and Rodeo, came in fifth at the San Antonio Stock and Rodeo earning $7,750, earned $5,417 at the ProRodeo Tour Finale, and won $4,875 at the Super Series Finish in Fort Worth.

=== 2020 National Finals Rodeo ===
Due to COVID-19, the NFR was held at the Globe Life Field in Arlington, Texas, this season. Kinsel was already in possession of the all-time record on a standard-sized pattern at 13.63 seconds back in Dodge City earlier this year. However, in their round Thursday night, Sister moved through the turns faster and sped through the pattern quicker than most horses can achieve, and they clocked the run at 16.56; a new record.

Kinsel had total NFR earnings of $270,615 this season, which was more than any other contestant. The amount broke her own 2017 record of $189,385 and gave her first RAM Top Gun Award. Kinsel finished the 2020 season with $349.076 total earnings, coming close to her own 2018 record of $350,700. Kinsel won her first NFR Average title this season with a time of 170.95 on 10 rounds. She won her third barrel racing world championship. Kinsel is the first WPRA member to win all these titles in a single season: world championship, NFR average championship, RAM Top Gun, and fast-time award.

The NFR allowed her to ride Sister on her victory lap this time, which is not usually done at rodeos. So of course, the reporters wanted to know about Sister.

They ask if she knows how special she is, and absolutely she knows she’s special to me, but I don’t think she knows she’s done a great thing, Kinsel said. I think she just has a great time. That, for me, is the most important thing. She loves it, she continues to love it, she has a blast out there. She doesn’t do it for anything I do it for. She does it because she thinks I asked her to and she likes me.

== 2021 season ==
In March, Kinsel competed at the American Rodeo another year. She won for the third time and took home $100,000 in prize money. Since no qualifier won their event, there were no competitors to win the $1 million bonus this year; thus, it carried over to the next year. In June, Kinsel competed at the Reno Rodeo, winning the reserve barrel racing championship and running the fastest time of the 2021 rodeo.

In July, Kinsel competed in the Fourth of July rodeos, a time of year known as "Cowboy Christmas" because of the large amount of prize money available to contestants. Kinsel's largest check was $8,099 from the Cody Stampede in Wyoming where she and Sister placed second with a 17.05 second time. They won the Livingston Roundup Rodeo in Montana with a time of 17.09 seconds for $7,200. She also came in second in St. Paul, Oregon, with a time of 17.51 seconds, for $6,705. After that, she gave Sister a break while she rode TJ in West Jordan, Utah, earning a check of $234. She also competed in Oakley, Utah, the only rodeo where she didn't place. Her total earnings during Cowboy Christmas were $22,238, making her the highest money earner for the event and, placing her back at the No. 2 spot in the World Standings as of July, 2021.

The 125th Cheyenne Frontier Days took place from July 23 to August 1 this year. The event is back after a hiatus last year due to COVID-19. It always takes place at Cheyenne Frontier Days Arena in Cheyenne, Wyoming. It bills itself as the world's largest, best, and most authentic rodeo. It boasts attendance of more than 250,000, and the rodeo includes all of the major events plus more.

In her opening round at Frontier Days, Kinsel's time was 17.56 which earned her fourth place and $3,404. She then competed in the second round with a time of 17.22 seconds and earned $5,499. In the third round, she took eighth place and earned $916, earning her a place in the finals on Sunday, August 1. In the finals, she and Sister clocked a run of 17.30 seconds in the short go, which won her first place in barrel racing in the rodeo. She earned $5,819 for winning. She also won the average, where she won an additional $10,997. This is her first time winning the "Daddy of 'Em All". There were 205 barrel racers entered in the rodeo this year. Kinsel gave all the credit to her horse Sister. "My horse is amazing... and tries so hard no matter what the job", praised Kinsel after her win. "By the grace of God she has carried me to some amazing places. She is truly the best thing in my life."

She also won the Tri-State Fair and Rodeo in Amarillo, Texas. She won the Tri-State Rodeo in Fort Madison, Iowa. She won the Kansas' Biggest Rodeo in Phllisburg, Kansas. She set the arena record on a standard pattern of 16.61 seconds. She won the Sheridan Wyoming Rodeo. She won the Ogden Utah Pioneer Days. She won the Livingston, Montana Round-Up. She was the co-champion at the Guymon, Oklahoma, Pioneer Days Rodeo. She finished second at the St. Paul Rodeo in Oregon. She finished second at the Cody, Wyoming, Stampede. She finished second at the Dinosaur Days Rodeo in Vernal, Montana.

== Career summary ==
- 4 WPRA barrel racing world championship titles (2018-2020, 2022)
- 1 NFR Average barrel racing title (2020)
- 9 NFR qualifications (2017-2025)
- 1 RAM Top Gun title (2020)

== Horses ==
DM Sissy Hayday "Sister" is a Palomino American Quarter Horse mare born in 2011. She is by PC Frenchmans Hayday and out of Royal Sissy Irish, who is a daughter of Royal Shakem.

- 2017 Scoti Flit Bar Rising Star Award
- 2018 Horse with the Most Heart
- 2018 AQHA/PRCA/WPRA Barrel Racing Horse of the Year
- 2019 Horse with the Most Heart - Three Way Tie for the Award with Freckles ridden by Shali Lord and Valor ridden by Donna Kay Rule
- 2021 Second place AQHA Barrel Racing Horse of the Year
- 2025 AQHA/PRCA/WPRA Barrel Racing Horse of the Year

Thunder Stones "TJ" was born in 2004. He is by Sticks and Stones and out of See F Jets Candy who is a daughter of Pines Easter Jet. He is a Quarter horse gelding.

DH Jess Stellar "Jules" was born in 2013. She is by Mighty Jess out of PC Frosted Stellar who is a daughter of Sun Frost. She is a Palomino mare Quarter horse, owned by Hodges Farm.

== Awards ==
- 2022 WPRA World Champion barrel racer
- 2020 WPRA World Champion barrel racer
- 2020 NFR Average Champion barrel racer
- 2019 WPRA World Champion barrel racer
- 2018 WPRA World Champion barrel racer
- 2016–2018 National Intercollegiate Rodeo Association (NIRA) barrel racing national qualifier
- 2018 NIRA College Champion barrel racer
- 2014 Texas High School Finals Rodeo Champion barrel racer Champion
- 2014, 2016 National High School Rodeo Association (NHSRA) Finals qualifier in barrel racing and breakaway roping

== Personal ==
Until recently, Hailey lived in the town where she grew up, Cotulla, Texas However, her current residence is her ranch in Stephenville, Texas. Kinsel graduated in 2017 from Texas A&M University (College Station) with a BA in Agriculture Economics. Kinsel competed on the Fightin' Aggie Rodeo team in barrel racing, breakaway roping, and goat tying. While attending university, she maintained a packed schedule that included classwork, taking care of three horses, leading a Bible study, and competing in PRCA rodeos.

In April 2018, Kinsel and two-time PBR world-champion bull rider Jess Lockwood started a relationship. A source confirmed they were still together on December 31, 2018. According to Lockwood, they had been dating for a year at that time. On March 28, 2019, Lockwood announced their engagement to be married on his Instagram account. On October 25, 2019, Lockwood and Kinsel were married at Kinsel's parent's ranch in Cotulla, Texas. She took his name, and used it professionally as Hailey Kinsel Lockwood. They used to split their time between winter at her ranch in Stephenville and spring at his in Montana. According to her profile on the WPRA website and her self-published sources, she is no longer using his surname.
