= Fowlerton, Texas =

- Census-designated place
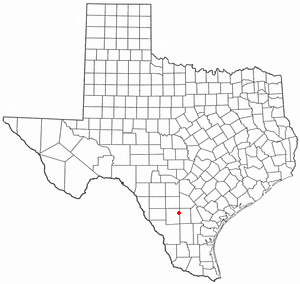
- Location of Fowlerton, Texas

- Coordinates: 28°27′53″N 98°48′42″W
- Country: United States
- State: Texas
- County: La Salle

Area
  - Total: 2.18 sq mi (5.64 km^{2})
  - Land: 2.17 sq mi (5.62 km^{2})
  - Water: 0.0039 sq mi (0.01 km^{2})
- Elevation: 318 ft (97 m)

Population (2020)
  - Total: 73
  - Density: 34/sq mi (13/km^{2})
- Time zone: UTC−6 (Central (CST))
  - Summer (DST): UTC−5 (CDT)
- ZIP Code: 78021
- Area code: 830
- FIPS code: 48-27144
- GNIS feature ID: 2408251

Fowlerton is a census-designated place (CDP) in La Salle County, Texas, United States. As of the 2020 census, Fowlerton had a population of 73.

== History ==
Fowlerton is named after The Fowler Brothers Land Company—an early 20th century initiative led by James and Charles Fowler to settle and develop a town on a 100,000 acre stretch of land.

To attract aspiring investors and farmers, the brothers carried out an advertisement campaign for farmland surrounding the townsite, describing themselves as “colonizers.” Additionally a cotton gin and water system were constructed. For 10$ a month after a 25$ down payment, a farmer would receive a 160 acre plot of land and a residential town lot. In 1911, The San Antonio, Uvalde and Gulf Railway Company had built lines through Fowlerton. At this point, the town consisted of 1,200 residents, two hotels, three general stores, a telephone system and a bank. The population would soon reach its peak of 2000 in 1914.

In 1917 a combination of droughts and low commodity prices led to financial decline. Simultaneously a variety of lawsuits were filed against the Fowler brothers on the basis of false advertising practices. The town would decline to a population of 600 by 1925 and never recover thereafter.

== Geography ==
Fowlerton is located in northeastern La Salle County at 28°27′53″N 98°48′42″W (28.464840, -98.811642). It is bordered to the east by McMullen County. Texas State Highway 97 passes through the community, leading north 29 miles (47 km) to Charlotte and west 27 miles (43 km) to Cotulla. Texas State Highway 72 leaves Highway 97 2 miles (3 km) north of Fowlerton and leads east 39 miles (63 km) to Three Rivers. San Antonio is 75 miles (121 km) north of Fowlerton, Corpus Christi is 114 miles (183 km) to the southeast, and Laredo is 100 miles (160 km) to the southwest.

According to the U.S. Census Bureau, the Fowlerton CDP has a total area of 2.2 square miles (5.6 km^{2}), of which 0.004 square miles (0.01 km^{2}), or 0.22%, are water. The Frio River runs along the northern edge of the community, leading east to the Nueces River at Three Rivers.

=== Climate ===
The climate in this area is characterized by hot, humid summers and generally mild to cool winters. According to the Köppen climate classification, Fowlerton has a humid subtropical climate, Cfa on climate maps. The all-time record high is 113 F (45 C), set on June 16, 1998. Conversely, the all-time record low is 9 F (-13 C, set on January 12, 1962 during the cold wave of 1962. The average date for the first frost is November 26, and the average date for the last frost is March 4. The most snow in one day is 5.0 inches (13 cm) on December 24, 2004. Fowlerton averages 22 nights below freezing annually.

Climate data for Fowlerton, Texas (normals 1991–2020, extremes 1913-1918, 1958-2013)
Month	Jan	Feb	Mar	Apr	May	Jun	Jul	Aug	Sep	Oct	Nov	Dec	Year
Record high °F (°C)	95 (35)	101 (38)	104 (40)	110 (43)	109 (43)	113 (45)	112 (44)	111 (44)	112 (44)	103 (39)	96 (36)	93 (34)	113 (45)
Mean maximum °F (°C)	80.7 (27.1)	88.7 (31.5)	92.1 (33.4)	97.1 (36.2)	100.8 (38.2)	103.0 (39.4)	102.5 (39.2)	104.0 (40.0)	100.5 (38.1)	96.2 (35.7)	89.6 (32.0)	83.9 (28.8)	106.2 (41.2)
Mean daily maximum °F (°C)	67.5 (19.7)	72.2 (22.3)	78.5 (25.8)	85.6 (29.8)	91.4 (33.0)	96.7 (35.9)	98.5 (36.9)	99.7 (37.6)	93.3 (34.1)	86.7 (30.4)	76.1 (24.5)	68.3 (20.2)	84.5 (29.2)
Daily mean °F (°C)	53.4 (11.9)	57.9 (14.4)	64.5 (18.1)	71.1 (21.7)	78.7 (25.9)	84.0 (28.9)	85.6 (29.8)	86.2 (30.1)	80.7 (27.1)	72.7 (22.6)	62.3 (16.8)	54.5 (12.5)	71.0 (21.7)
Mean daily minimum °F (°C)	39.2 (4.0)	43.5 (6.4)	50.4 (10.2)	56.7 (13.7)	65.9 (18.8)	71.4 (21.9)	72.7 (22.6)	72.7 (22.6)	68.1 (20.1)	58.8 (14.9)	48.5 (9.2)	40.7 (4.8)	57.4 (14.1)
Mean minimum °F (°C)	24.3 (−4.3)	27.2 (−2.7)	31.4 (−0.3)	40.7 (4.8)	52.0 (11.1)	65.2 (18.4)	69.7 (20.9)	68.5 (20.3)	55.1 (12.8)	39.6 (4.2)	30.8 (−0.7)	24.2 (−4.3)	21.9 (−5.6)
Record low °F (°C)	9 (−13)	16 (−9)	19 (−7)	30 (−1)	40 (4)	55 (13)	60 (16)	59 (15)	40 (4)	25 (−4)	21 (−6)	10 (−12)	9 (−13)
Average precipitation inches (mm)	1.47 (37)	1.08 (27)	2.11 (54)	1.82 (46)	3.43 (87)	2.65 (67)	2.80 (71)	1.97 (50)	3.86 (98)	2.30 (58)	1.32 (34)	1.45 (37)	26.26 (666)
Average snowfall inches (cm)	0.0 (0.0)	0.0 (0.0)	0.0 (0.0)	0.0 (0.0)	0.0 (0.0)	0.0 (0.0)	0.0 (0.0)	0.0 (0.0)	0.0 (0.0)	0.0 (0.0)	0.0 (0.0)	0.2 (0.51)	0.2 (0.51)
Average precipitation days (≥ 0.01 in)	5.8	5.2	5.9	3.9	5.4	4.8	5.3	4.1	5.7	4.2	3.9	5.7	61.1
Average snowy days (≥ 0.1 in)	0.0	0.0	0.0	0.0	0.0	0.0	0.0	0.0	0.0	0.0	0.0	0.1	0.1
Source: NOAA

== Demographics ==
Historical population
Census	Pop.	Note	%±
2000	62		—
2010	55		−11.3%
2020	73		32.7%
U.S. Decennial Census; 1850–1900 1910; 1920 1930 1940; 1950 1960 1970; 1980 1990 2000; 2010

Fowlerton first appeared as a census designated place in the 2000 U.S. census.

=== 2020 census ===
Fowlerton CDP, Texas – Racial and ethnic composition Note: the US Census treats Hispanic/Latino as an ethnic category. This table excludes Latinos from the racial categories and assigns them to a separate category. Hispanics/Latinos may be of any race.
Race / Ethnicity (NH = Non-Hispanic)	Pop 2000	Pop 2010	Pop 2020	% 2000	% 2010	% 2020
White alone (NH)	47	28	37	75.81%	50.91%	50.68%
Black or African American alone (NH)	0	0	0	0.00%	0.00%	0.00%
Native American or Alaska Native alone (NH)	0	0	1	0.00%	0.00%	1.37%
Asian alone (NH)	0	0	0	0.00%	0.00%	0.00%
Native Hawaiian or Pacific Islander alone (NH)	0	0	0	0.00%	0.00%	0.00%
Other race alone (NH)	0	0	0	0.00%	0.00%	0.00%
Mixed race or Multiracial (NH)	0	0	1	0.00%	0.00%	1.37%
Hispanic or Latino (any race)	15	27	34	24.19%	49.09%	46.58%
Total	62	55	73	100.00%	100.00%	100.00%

=== 2000 census ===
As of the census of 2000, 62 people and 18 families, and 28 households were residing in the Fowlerton CDP. The population density was 28.5 people per mi^{2} (11.0/km^{2}). The 45 housing units averaged 20.7/mi^{2} (8.0/km^{2}). The racial makeup of the CDP was 95.16% White and 4.84% from other races. Hispanics or Latinos of any race were 24.19% of the population.

Of the 28 households, 25.0% had children under the age of 18 living with them, 60.7% were married couples living together, 3.6% had a female householder with no husband present, and 35.7% were not families. About 35.7% of all households were made up of individuals, and 14.3% had someone living alone who was 65 years of age or older. The average household size was 2.21, and the average family size was 2.89.

In the CDP, the age distribution was 25.8% under 18, 1.6% from 18 to 24, 22.6% from 25 to 44, 33.9% from 45 to 64, and 16.1% who were 65 or older. The median age was 46 years. For every 100 females, there were 87.9 males. For every 100 females age 18 and over, there were 76.9 males.

The median income for a household in the CDP was $19,107, and for a family was $23,750. Males had a median income of $0 versus $40,417 for females. The per capita income for the CDP was $16,497. No families and 8.5% of the population were living below the poverty line, including no one under 18 or over 64.

== Education ==
Fowlerton is served by the Cotulla Independent School District, but most pupils transfer to McMullen County High School in Tilden.
