= Encinal County, Texas =

County in Texas

Coordinates: 27.7696°N 99.11345°W

Encinal County
- Former U.S. county in Texas
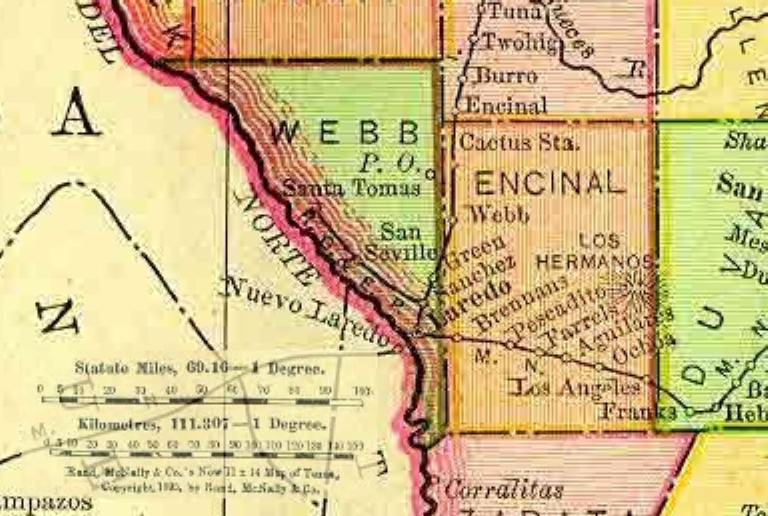
- Map of Webb and Encinal Counties in 1895
- Interactive map of Encinal County
- Founded: 1856
- Abolished: 1899
- Named after: Spanish word for oak grove

Population
  - Estimate (1890): 2,744

Encinal County was a former Texas county. Its area is now completely contained in the present Webb County. The name "Encinal" translates to "Oak Grove" in English.

== History ==
Encinal County was established on February 1, 1856 and was to consist of the eastern portion of present-day Webb County. The law creating the county called for a county seat at an unspecified location to be called Encinal; however, the seat was never established. The present town of Encinal, located nearby in La Salle County, had not yet adopted its current name at the time Encinal County was created. The county was never organized and was finally absorbed into Webb County on March 12, 1899. Had it been established in the present day, Ranchitos Las Lomas would have been the county seat.

== Geography ==
The Texas state law that created the county of Encinal laid out the following boundaries:

The following limits, to wit: beginning at the north-west corner of Duval county, thence due west with the south line of La Salle to its south-west corner; thence due south to the line of Zapata county; thence with the lines of Zapata and Starr, to the south-west corner of Duval county; thence north with the west line of Duval, to the beginning, shall constitute the county of Encinal, the county seat therof shall bear the same name.

Adjacent counties

- La Salle County (north)
- Duval County (east)
- Zapata County (south)
- Webb County (west)

== Demographics ==
Population statistics for Encinal County, Texas from U.S. Census data tabulated between the creation and dissolution of the county:

Census Year	Population
1860	43
1870	427
1880	1,902
1890	2,744
