= Dull =

Dull may refer to:

== Places ==
- Dull, Perth and Kinross, Scotland, United Kingdom, a village
- Dull, Ohio, United States, an unincorporated community
- Dull, Texas, United States, a ghost town

== People ==
- Dick Dull (1945–2026), American athlete and athletic director
- Gayle Dull (1883–1918), American middle-distance runner
- Jack Dull (1930–1995), American professor, scholar of the history of Han China
- Orville O. Dull (1888–1978), American film producer and director
- Ryan Dull (born 1989), American Major League Baseball pitcher

== Other uses ==
- Dull Gret, a figure of Flemish folklore

== See also ==
- Hugh the Dull, Lord of Douglas (1294 – between 1342 and 1346), Scottish nobleman and cleric
- Dul (disambiguation)
- Dullness (disambiguation)
