= Dul =

Dul may refer to:

- Důl, a municipality and village in the Czech Republic
- Dul Madoba, a Somali group
- Dul Koeun, Cambodian politician
- Dul Rural District, in West Azerbaijan Province, Iran

== See also ==
- DUL (disambiguation)
- Dull (disambiguation)
