= Cotulla–La Salle County Airport =

Airport in Texas, United States

- IATA: COT; ICAO: KCOT; FAA LID: COT

Summary
- Airport type: Public
- Owner: City of Cotulla/La Salle County
- Serves: Cotulla, Texas
- Elevation AMSL: 474 ft (144 m)
- Coordinates: 28°27′24″N 099°13′06″W

Map
- Location within Texas

Runways
Direction	Length		Surface
Direction	ft	m	Surface
13/31	6,005	1,830	Asphalt

Statistics (2023)
- Aircraft operations (year ending 4/22/2023): 13,450
- Based aircraft: 8
- Source: Federal Aviation Administration

Cotulla–La Salle County Airport (IATA: COT, ICAO: KCOT, FAA LID: COT) is a public use airport located one nautical mile (1.85 km) northeast of the central business district of Cotulla, a city in La Salle County, Texas, United States. It is owned by the City of Cotulla and La Salle County. According to the FAA's National Plan of Integrated Airport Systems for 2009–2013, it is categorized as a general aviation facility.

== Facilities and aircraft ==
Cotulla–La Salle County Airport covers an area of 317 acres (128 ha) at an elevation of 474 feet (144 m) above mean sea level. It has one runway designated 13/31 with an asphalt surface measuring 6,005 by 75 feet (1,830 x 23 m).

For the 12-month period ending April 22, 2023, the airport had 13,450 aircraft operations, an average of 37 per day: 78% general aviation, 16% military, and 6% air taxi. At that time there were 8 aircraft based at this airport: 5 single-engine, 1 multi-engine and 2 helicopter.

== See also ==
- List of airports in Texas
