= Atlee, Texas =

Ghost town in Texas, US

Atlee
- Ghost town
- Location in Texas
- Coordinates: 28.13055840°N 99.32670030°W
- Country: United States
- State: Texas
- County: La Salle

Atlee is a ghost town in La Salle County, Texas, United States. Built upon a stop on the International–Great Northern Railroad, the community was established after 1880. It failed to grow further, and was abandoned during the 20th century.
