= DUL =

DUL may refer to:

- Dialup Users List
- DOLCE+DnS-Ultralite - A lighter OWL axiomatization of DOLCE and DnS upper ontologies.
- Dullingham railway station

== See also ==
- Dul (disambiguation)
