= Encinal, Texas =

- City
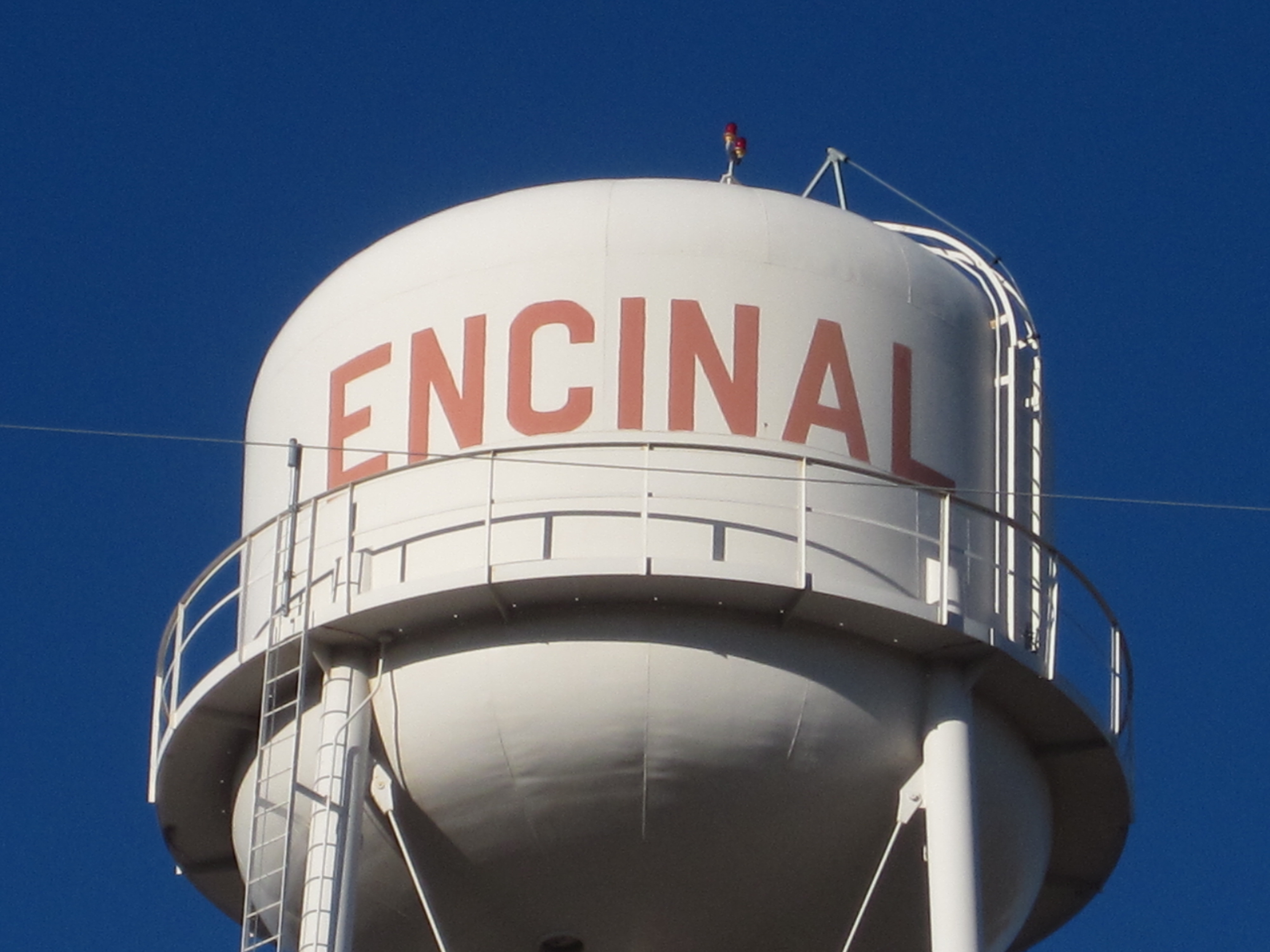
- Encinal water tower

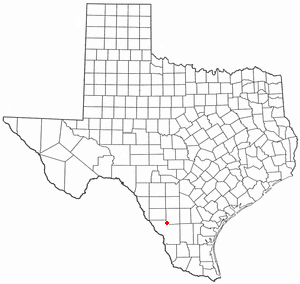
- Location of Encinal, Texas

- Coordinates: 28°2′28″N 99°21′17″W
- Country: United States
- State: Texas
- County: La Salle

Area
  - Total: 0.43 sq mi (1.12 km^{2})
  - Land: 0.43 sq mi (1.12 km^{2})
  - Water: 0 sq mi (0.00 km^{2})
- Elevation: 558 ft (170 m)

Population (2020)
  - Total: 540
  - Density: 1,200/sq mi (480/km^{2})
- Time zone: UTC-6 (Central (CST))
  - Summer (DST): UTC-5 (CDT)
- ZIP code: 78019
- Area code: 956
- FIPS code: 48-24240
- GNIS feature ID: 2410439
- Website: https://www.cityofencinal.com/

Encinal (/ˌɛnsɪˈnɔːl/ EN-sin-AWL) is a city in La Salle County, Texas, United States. The population was 540 at the 2020 census. Interstate 35 Business runs through the community. There are few businesses in Encinal; most have closed along the main street.

Railroad officials named the town for the Spanish word for oak grove. The population peaked in 1937 at eight hundred residents.

== History ==
Encinal may be named for the Spanish word for a holm or holly oak grove. The town was supposed to be the county seat for Encinal County, which was established on February 1, 1856, and was to consist of the eastern portion of Webb County. The county was never organized and was finally dissolved on March 12, 1899. The Encinal territory was absorbed into Webb County, and Encinal became part of La Salle County.

== Geography ==
Encinal is located at 28°2′28″N 99°21′17″W.

According to the United States Census Bureau, the city has a total area of 0.4 square miles (1.0 km^{2}), all land.

== Climate ==
The climate in this area is characterized by very hot, humid summers and generally mild to cool winters. According to the Köppen Climate Classification system, Encinal has a humid subtropical climate (Cfa), bordering a hot semi-arid climate (BSh). Thea all-time record high of 116 °F (47 °C) was recorded on June 17th, 1998, while the all-time record low of 8 °F (-13 °C) was recorded on January 12th & 13th, 1962. On average, there are 56 days where the temperature reaches at least 100 °F (38 °C) in a year. Freezing temperatures are recorded almost every winter.

Climate data for Encinal, Texas (1991–2020 normals, extremes 1907–2020)
Month	Jan	Feb	Mar	Apr	May	Jun	Jul	Aug	Sep	Oct	Nov	Dec	Year
Record high °F (°C)	96 (36)	101 (38)	105 (41)	110 (43)	115 (46)	116 (47)	114 (46)	112 (44)	111 (44)	105 (41)	98 (37)	98 (37)	116 (47)
Mean maximum °F (°C)	84.0 (28.9)	90.0 (32.2)	94.6 (34.8)	100.0 (37.8)	102.3 (39.1)	105.2 (40.7)	104.8 (40.4)	105.8 (41.0)	101.0 (38.3)	96.6 (35.9)	88.9 (31.6)	83.4 (28.6)	107.8 (42.1)
Mean daily maximum °F (°C)	67.6 (19.8)	72.4 (22.4)	79.1 (26.2)	86.6 (30.3)	92.4 (33.6)	97.9 (36.6)	98.4 (36.9)	99.7 (37.6)	92.6 (33.7)	86.1 (30.1)	76.0 (24.4)	67.6 (19.8)	84.7 (29.3)
Daily mean °F (°C)	55.2 (12.9)	59.2 (15.1)	65.2 (18.4)	72.6 (22.6)	79.3 (26.3)	84.8 (29.3)	85.7 (29.8)	86.2 (30.1)	81.0 (27.2)	73.0 (22.8)	63.5 (17.5)	55.3 (12.9)	71.8 (22.1)
Mean daily minimum °F (°C)	42.9 (6.1)	46.0 (7.8)	51.3 (10.7)	58.5 (14.7)	66.3 (19.1)	71.7 (22.1)	73.0 (22.8)	72.8 (22.7)	69.5 (20.8)	60.0 (15.6)	51.0 (10.6)	42.9 (6.1)	58.8 (14.9)
Mean minimum °F (°C)	30.6 (−0.8)	31.7 (−0.2)	35.7 (2.1)	43.5 (6.4)	54.6 (12.6)	65.5 (18.6)	69.4 (20.8)	69.1 (20.6)	60.5 (15.8)	46.6 (8.1)	35.4 (1.9)	30.8 (−0.7)	27.1 (−2.7)
Record low °F (°C)	8 (−13)	15 (−9)	23 (−5)	29 (−2)	40 (4)	51 (11)	57 (14)	60 (16)	44 (7)	31 (−1)	21 (−6)	11 (−12)	8 (−13)
Average precipitation inches (mm)	1.03 (26)	1.08 (27)	2.24 (57)	1.93 (49)	2.63 (67)	2.38 (60)	2.66 (68)	1.63 (41)	3.18 (81)	2.45 (62)	1.20 (30)	1.13 (29)	23.54 (598)
Average snowfall inches (cm)	0.0 (0.0)	0.0 (0.0)	0.0 (0.0)	0.0 (0.0)	0.0 (0.0)	0.0 (0.0)	0.0 (0.0)	0.0 (0.0)	0.0 (0.0)	0.0 (0.0)	0.0 (0.0)	0.3 (0.76)	0.3 (0.76)
Average precipitation days (≥ 0.01 in)	2.6	2.4	2.8	2.4	4.1	3.3	3.3	2.3	4.8	2.5	2.3	1.7	34.5
Average snowy days (≥ 0.1 in)	0.0	0.0	0.0	0.0	0.0	0.0	0.0	0.0	0.0	0.0	0.0	0.1	0.1
Source: NOAA

== Transportation ==
=== Highways ===
- Interstate Highway 35, exit 38, Runs directly through town to the east.
- Texas State Highway 44. Runs through town, Ends at US 83 far west of town.
- US 83. Bypasses town to the Far West.

=== Air travel ===
- Laredo International Airport (in Laredo)

== Demographics ==
Historical population
Census	Pop.	Note	%±
1890	562		—
1980	704		—
1990	620		−11.9%
2000	629		1.5%
2010	559		−11.1%
2020	540		−3.4%
U.S. Decennial Census

=== 2020 census ===
As of the 2020 census, Encinal had a population of 540. The median age was 40.3 years, while 24.4% of residents were under the age of 18 and 19.6% were 65 years of age or older. For every 100 females there were 96.4 males, and for every 100 females age 18 and over there were 95.2 males age 18 and over.

0.0% of residents lived in urban areas, while 100.0% lived in rural areas.

There were 181 households in Encinal, of which 37.0% had children under the age of 18 living in them. Of all households, 51.4% were married-couple households, 18.8% were households with a male householder and no spouse or partner present, and 26.0% were households with a female householder and no spouse or partner present. About 23.2% of all households were made up of individuals and 13.2% had someone living alone who was 65 years of age or older.

There were 256 housing units, of which 29.3% were vacant. The homeowner vacancy rate was 2.6% and the rental vacancy rate was 42.4%.

Racial composition as of the 2020 census
Race	Number	Percent
White	242	44.8%
Black or African American	4	0.7%
American Indian and Alaska Native	4	0.7%
Asian	0	0.0%
Native Hawaiian and Other Pacific Islander	0	0.0%
Some other race	60	11.1%
Two or more races	230	42.6%
Hispanic or Latino (of any race)	506	93.7%

=== 2000 census ===
As of the census of 2000, there were 629 people, 215 households, and 159 families residing in the city. The population density was 1,616.4 inhabitants per square mile (624.1/km^{2}). There were 276 housing units at an average density of 709.2 per square mile (273.8/km^{2}). The racial makeup of the city was 74.56% White, 0.16% African American, 0.32% Native American, 23.05% from other races, and 1.91% from two or more races. Hispanic or Latino of any race were 91.26% of the population.

There were 215 households, out of which 40.5% had children under the age of 18 living with them, 51.2% were married couples living together, 17.7% had a female householder with no husband present, and 25.6% were non-families. 22.3% of all households were made up of individuals, and 12.1% had someone living alone who was 65 years of age or older. The average household size was 2.93 and the average family size was 3.50.

In the city, the population was spread out, with 31.8% under the age of 18, 9.9% from 18 to 24, 24.6% from 25 to 44, 19.7% from 45 to 64, and 14.0% who were 65 years of age or older. The median age was 31 years. For every 100 females, there were 101.0 males. For every 100 females age 18 and over, there were 102.4 males.

The median income for a household in the city was $14,853, and the median income for a family was $18,125. Males had a median income of $18,250 versus $13,750 for females. The per capita income for the city was $6,928. About 37.2% of families and 38.1% of the population were below the poverty line, including 42.9% of those under age 18 and 30.2% of those age 65 or over.

== Education ==
- Encinal is within the Cotulla Independent School District.

== Notable people ==
- Rodney Lewis, CEO of Lewis Energy, has a ranch in Encinal
- George Strait, country music artist lives on his 8,000+ acre ranch near Encinal

== Gallery ==
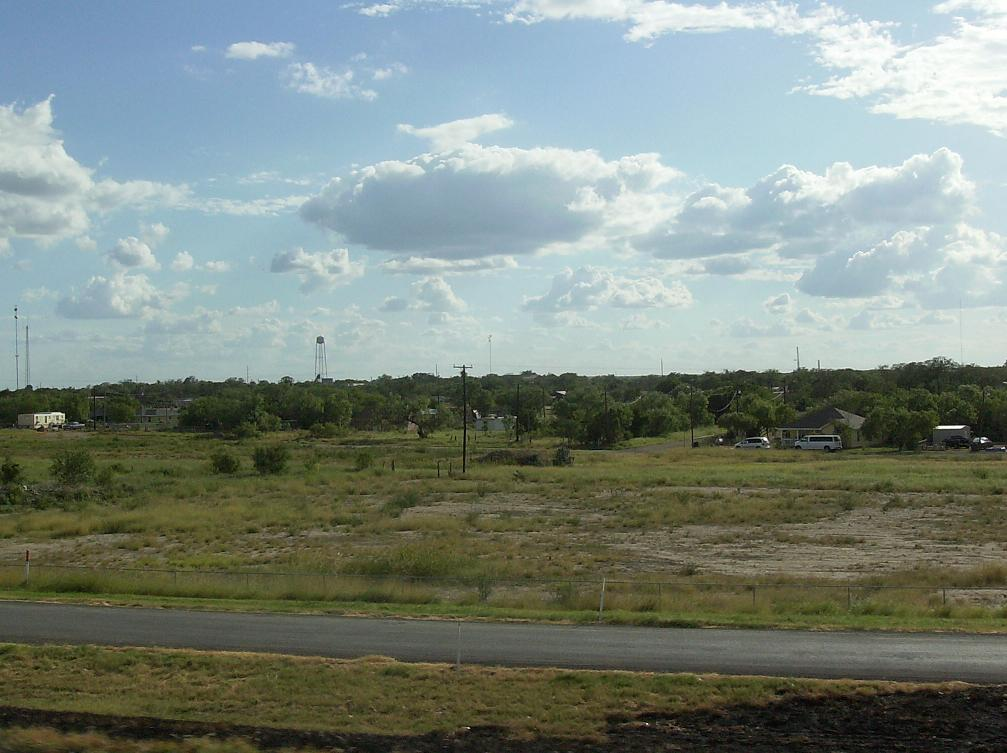
A glimpse of Encinal from Interstate 35.

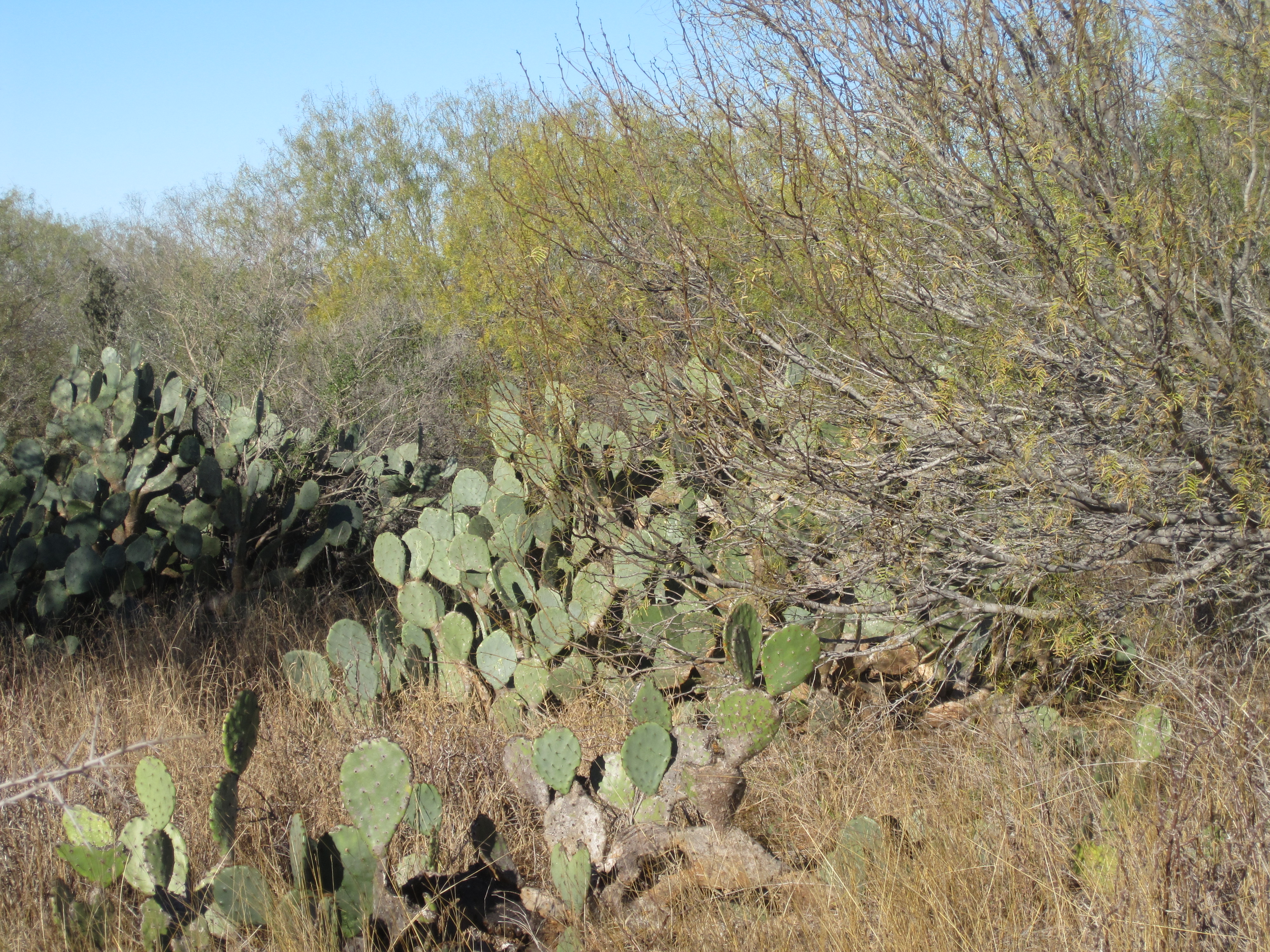
Cactus around Encinal & La Salle County

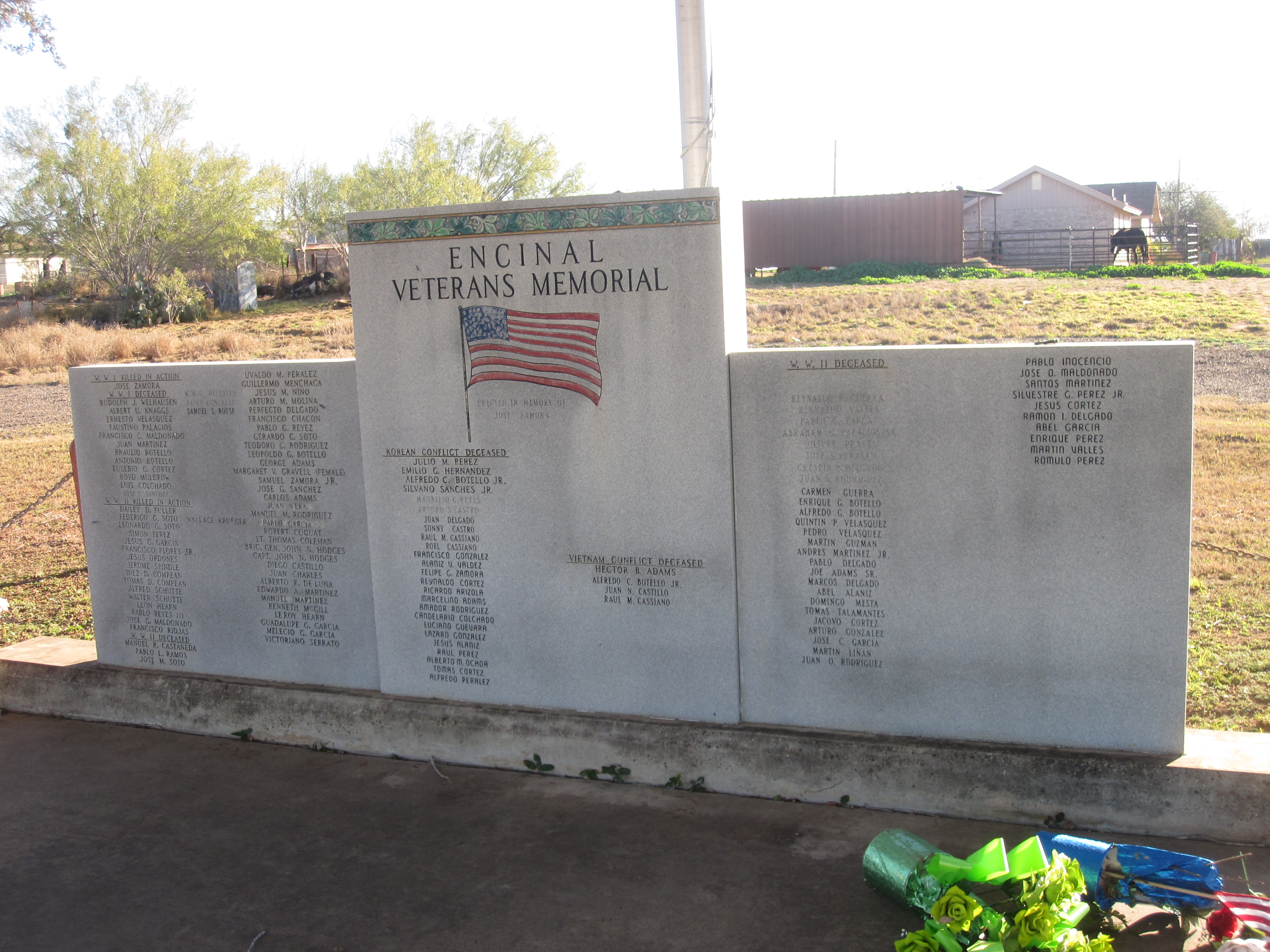
Veteran's Monument in Encinal
