= Dullness =

Dullness may refer to:

== In vision ==
- A lack of perceived brightness
- A lack of perceived colorfulness

== In medicine ==
- A dull sound in response to percussion (medicine)
  - Shifting dullness, a medical sign

== In philosophy and religion ==
- Tamas (philosophy), one of the three tendencies in the Samkhya school of Hindu philosophy
- Thīna, an unwholesome mental factor in Buddhism
- Laya or bying-ba, in the five faults and eight antidotes of Tibetan Buddhism

== Other uses ==
- Dulling, the tendency of a blade to lose sharpness
- Stupidity
- A tendency to cause boredom
- Drowsiness (archaic)

== See also ==
- Dull (disambiguation)
- Dulness, a goddess in The Dunciad
- Dully, a municipality in the canton of Vaud in Switzerland
