= Dull, Texas =

- Ghost town
- Location within Texas Location within the United States
- Coordinates: 28°26′42″N 98°55′52″W
- Country: United States
- State: Texas
- County: La Salle
- Elevation: 348 ft (106 m)
- Time zone: UTC-6 (Central (CST))
  - Summer (DST): UTC-5 (CDT)
- GNIS feature ID: 1378235

Dull is a populated place in La Salle County, Texas, United States.

== History ==
Brothers James and Andrew Dull owned a large ranch in La Salle County in the late 1800s. Tracts of the ranch were sold when it closed in 1901, and the community of Dull—named after the ranch—was established in 1912 on one of those tracts.

The settlement was located along the San Antonio, Uvalde and Gulf Railroad. A post office—established in 1913—changed its name to "Nettaville" in 1915, and closed in 1919.

During the 1940s, oil from a nearby well was loaded onto tank cars at Dull and then shipped by rail.
