= Důl =

- Municipality
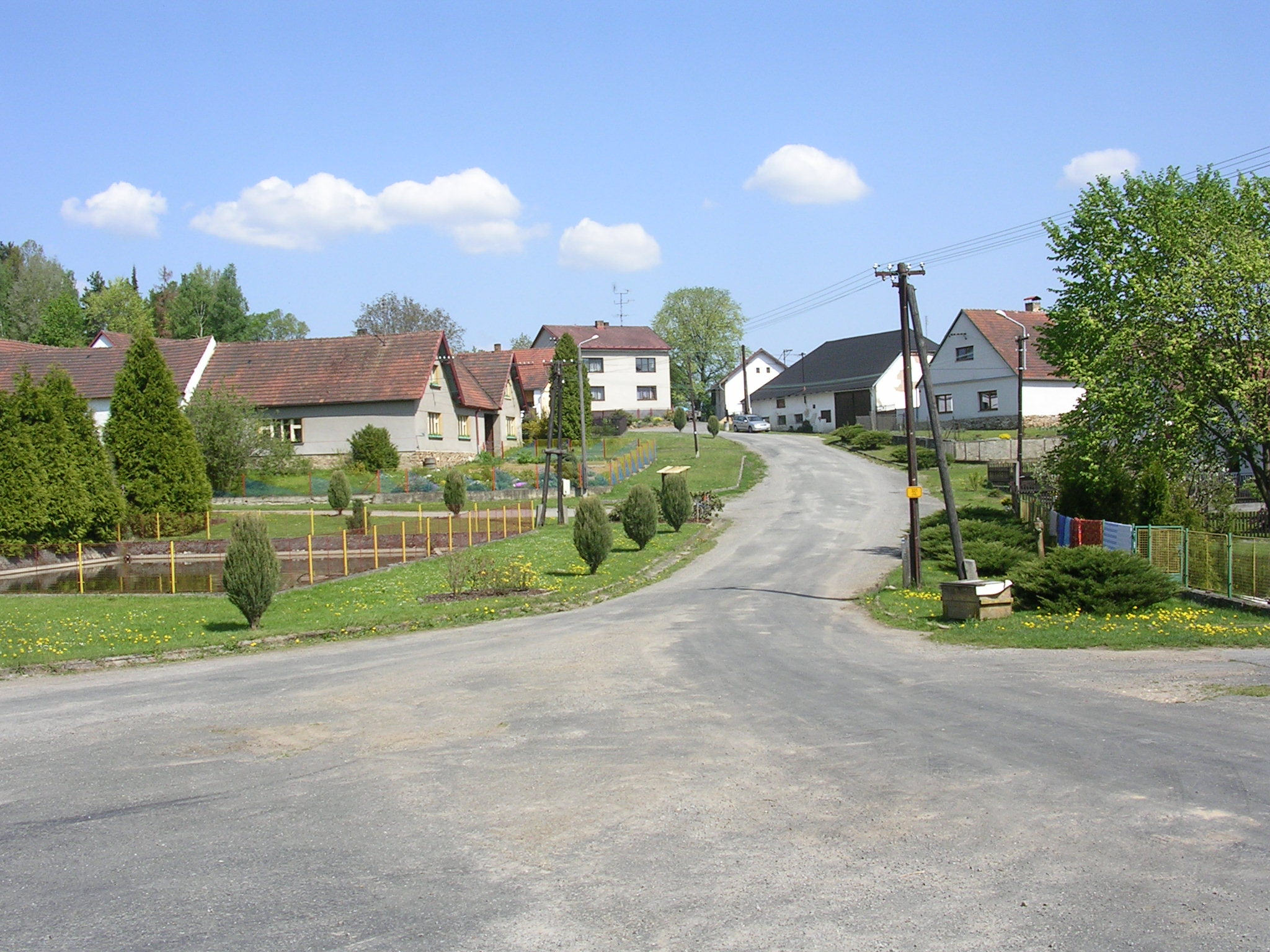
- Centre of Důl

- Location in the Czech Republic
- Coordinates: 49°27′8″N 15°1′48″E
- Country: Czech Republic
- Region: Vysočina
- District: Pelhřimov
- First mentioned: 1542

Area
  - Total: 2.33 km^{2} (0.90 sq mi)
- Elevation: 520 m (1,710 ft)

Population (2026-01-01)
  - Total: 53
  - Density: 23/km^{2} (59/sq mi)
- Time zone: UTC+1 (CET)
  - Summer (DST): UTC+2 (CEST)
- Postal code: 395 01
- Website: obecdul.cz

Důl is a municipality and village in Pelhřimov District in the Vysočina Region of the Czech Republic. It has about 50 inhabitants.

Důl lies approximately 15 kilometres (9 mi) west of Pelhřimov, 42 km (26 mi) west of Jihlava, and 83 km (52 mi) south-east of Prague.

== Administrative division ==
Důl consists of two municipal parts (in brackets population according to the 2021 census):

- Důl (24)
- Nová Ves (27)

== Demographics ==
Historical population
Year	Pop.	±%
1869	323	—
1880	278	−13.9%
1890	305	+9.7%
1900	293	−3.9%
1910	296	+1.0%
1921	280	−5.4%
1930	249	−11.1%
1950	163	−34.5%
1961	162	−0.6%
1970	131	−19.1%
1980	100	−23.7%
1991	75	−25.0%
2001	53	−29.3%
2011	50	−5.7%
2021	51	+2.0%
Source: Censuses
