= Jessica Routier =

American barrel racer

- Occupation: Rodeo competitor
- Discipline: Barrel racing
- Born: June 20, 1983 (age 43); Buffalo, South Dakota
- Major wins/Championships: 2018, 2019 Women’s Professional Rodeo Association

Significant horses
- Fiery Miss West "Missy " Especials Smoothie "Smoothie"

Jessica Routier is a professional barrel racer who has competed in many rodeos all over the world. She has three National Finals Rodeo qualifications, and she has seven National Circuit Finals Rodeo qualifications.

== Early life ==
Routier was born Jessica Mueller on June 20, 1983. She grew up in Montfort, Wisconsin. Routier grew up around horses; her mother and father rodeoed a little bit in their college and earlier years, which led her to do every girls event possible. She competed at Little Britches Rodeos and the Wisconsin High School Rodeo Association winning the Wisconsin high school cutting title for four years, the goat tying three years, and the pole bending and breakaway roping twice. She is also a three-time Wisconsin all-around champion.

With a rodeo scholarship to National American University in Rapid City, South Dakota, she competed under the tutelage of Glen Lammers and she qualified for the College National Finals Rodeo four times, winning the national barrel racing title in 2003. She graduated in 2006 with a master’s degree in business.

== Personal life ==
Routier met her future husband Riley while attending university in Rapid City, and she was married in 2007. She and her husband have five children: four girls and one boy. Her family usually travels with her to her competitions. Her family lives on a farm where they farm grass and raise cattle; the land is mostly leased from Riley's parents. Her oldest son Braden has competed in the South Dakota High School Rodeo Finals, while her second child Payton also competes in rodeo.

== Horses ==
Routier rides horses that have been provided by Gary Westergren, from Westergren Quarter Horses of Lincoln, Nebraska. Prior to meeting Routier, Westergren was looking for someone who could get one of his horses into the National Finals Rodeo, and he found that person in Routier. She gets Westergren's horses as two-year-olds and sends them out for thirty days. Then she gets them back, putting lots of ranch miles on them and slowly introducing them to barrels. She and Westergren then decide if the horse is a good fit for her or not. If they agree, then the horse stays; if not, Westergren will sell it, however if it is a mare he will take it back and breed it.

Smoothie was trained by Routier's mother, Shelly Mueller, and Routier competed on the horse during high school and college, winning the College National Finals Rodeo. As of 2021, Smoothie is a 26-year old mare.

Fiery Miss West, or "Missy", is Routier's current horse, owned by Westergren. Routier began riding Missy in 2017 as a futurity horse. Routier stated that Missy reminded her of "Smoothie". She has described Missy as special, "had a lot of good qualities that I knew I liked", and "it's natural; the way I want to ride is the way she wants to be ridden." As of 2021, Missy is a 10-year old mare.

== Career ==
As of 2019, Routier has competed in over 58 rodeos. She has earned $643,308 in career winnings as of 2020. She is ranked 7th in the world in barrel racing. She has qualified to the 2018, 2019, and 2020 National Finals Rodeo, and finished 3rd in the average finish for barrel racing at the 2020 National Finals Rodeo, a place she also claimed at the 2020 RAM National Circuit Finals Rodeo.

=== Career highlights ===
In 2017, she won the Badlands Circuit year-end title. In 2018 she finished the year as reserve WPRA World Champion with $251,704 and was second in the NFR average race. She placed in 7 out of 10 rounds at her first Wrangler NFR. In 2019, she entered the Wrangler NFR ranked 8th. She placed in six out of 10 rounds, finished 9th in the average and remained ranked 8th in the world. She won a total of $94,615 at the NFR and finished the year with $191,197 in earnings. In 2020 she finished third in the average at the National Finals Rodeo, scoring 174.59 seconds across 10 runs, winning $82,346. She won the Oregon Trail Rodeo.

== Awards ==
- 2020: Badlands Circuit Finals Rodeo Barrel Racing Horse of the Year.
- 2018–2019: She won the Jerry Ann Taylor Best Dressed Award Winner at the Wrangler NFR.
