= Kelly Kaminski =

American barrel racer

Kelly Kaminski is an American former professional rodeo cowgirl who specialized in barrel racing. She is a two-time Women's Professional Rodeo Association (WPRA) barrel racing world champion. In December 2004 and 2005, she won the championship at the Thomas & Mack Center at the National Finals Rodeo (NFR) in Las Vegas, Nevada.

== Life ==
Kaminski overcame many obstacles in her life to become a world champion. She had limited exposure to barrel racing in her youth and did not have a horse until her early teens. She did not compete until after graduating college. She became a teacher after college, her salary forcing her to forego most of the futurity and derby competition. Her motto is "Dream Big and Believe".

== Career ==
Kaminski was pregnant during the year her horse Rocky was eligible for the futurity. Due to this, she only entered one futurity. However, she did go to many Quarter Horse shows, and qualified for the World Show. Still pregnant, she made that her last show until after Kenna was born. As for the derby, Kaminski only competed in one, which was in the fall of next year. Kaminski says that she really "seasoned" Rocky at the 4Ds, that and the small circuit rodeos. She especially competed at the Mesquite Rodeo frequently because Rocky liked that arena. In 2000, they won the Chuck Dunn and Phil Goost-sree 4D Productions year-end championship and horse trailer. In 2000, they also won the Texas NBHA State 1D Open Championship in Austin, Texas. In 2001, she won the Chuck Dunn and Phil Goost-sree 4D Productions year-end championship and trophy saddle.

During this period of seasoning Rocky, she taught seventh grade for nine years. Kaminski had earned a B.A. at Sam Houston State University in Huntsville, Texas. So, in 2000, her husband urged her to quit and rodeo full-time. Unlike many competitors, Kaminski loves the traveling part of the road. She is not stretching the truth when she says, "I was born to do this".

Kaminski was the reserve barrel racing world champion in 2002 behind Charmayne James. She and Rocky hit a barrel in one round of this year's NFR. She was the reserve barrel racing world champion in 2003 behind Janae Ward. They got a no time in the 7th round, when Rocky ducked a barrel, at this NFR.

Kaminski won the barrel racing world championship two years consecutively. In 2004, she won $96,665 in the regular season. She then won $82,707 at the NFR. She finished the season with total earnings for 2004 of $179,372, which was enough to win the championship. She won her first NFR by $22,552 over Molly Powell, who had earnings of $156,820. Kaminski said she was relieved to get past the 7th round where Rocky had ducked the barrel the year before. Kaminski also won the 2005 barrel world riding championship. She qualified for the NFR five times.

== Rocky ==
Kaminski's horse Rocky was born on April 24, 1993. He was considered a member of Kaminski's family from the time he was born. His registered name is Rockem Sock-em Go. He was a gray gelding. Rocky's mother was registered with the American Quarter Horse Association (AQHA) as The Brown Filly. Kaminski won everything on Rocky. Rocky was sired by Mito Wise Wrangler out of The Brown Filly, who was a daughter of Easy Crimson. His pedigree has many champion Quarter Horses in it. He was named the Horse with the Most Heart three times at the NFR. In 2007, an injury and arthritis compelled Kaminski to retire Rocky. Rocky has since died due to Melanoma.

== Personal life ==
Kaminski is married to her husband Jerry. They have a daughter, Kenna, and she has a stepson, Colton. Kaminski resides in Bellville, Texas. Her favorite rodeo is her hometown rodeo, the Austin County Fair and Rodeo, which she has won once. Kaminski spends some of her time after retirement from barrel racing holding clinics and working with the Junior NFR. Her daughter, Kenna, is a barrel racer, whom she helps train. Kaminski also is a partner with Circle Y in some rodeo products, such as saddles.
