= Cotulla Independent School District =

School district in Texas, United States

Cotulla Independent School District is a public school district based in Cotulla, Texas, USA.

In addition to Cotulla, the district serves most of La Salle County, including the city of Encinal and the community of Fowlerton.

In 2009, the school district was rated "academically acceptable" by the Texas Education Agency.

Lyndon B. Johnson was principal of Cotulla's Welhausen school (September 1928–May 1929), for $125/month. Later, he was the 36th president of the United States.

== Schools ==
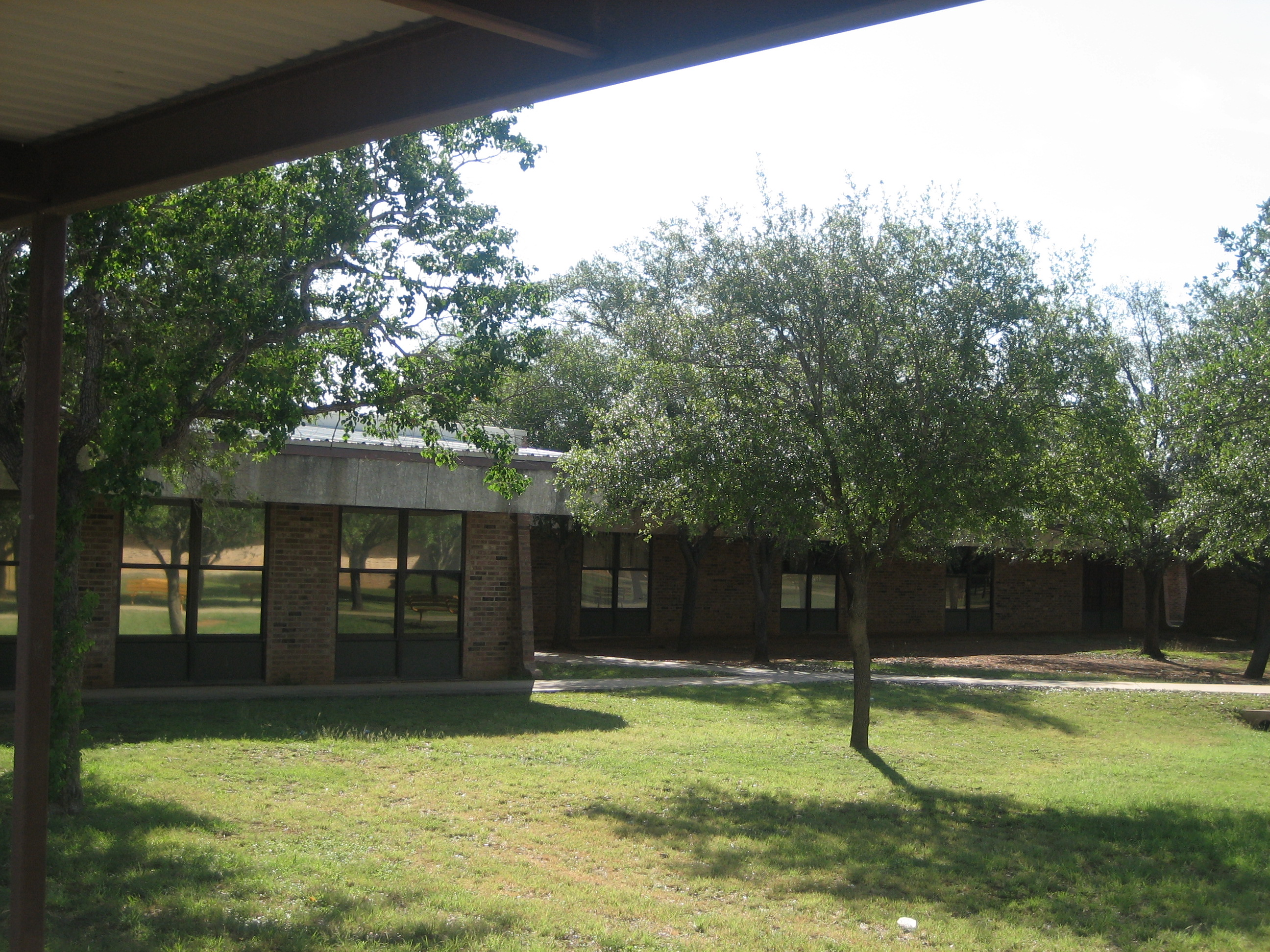
Part of Cotulla High School campus

- Cotulla High School (grades 9-12)
- Frank Newman Middle School (grades 6-8)
- Ramirez-Burks Elementary School (prekindergarten-grade 5)
- Encinal Elementary School (prekindergarten-grade 5)
- Cotulla Alternative Campus
