= La Salle County, Texas =

County in Texas, United States

- County
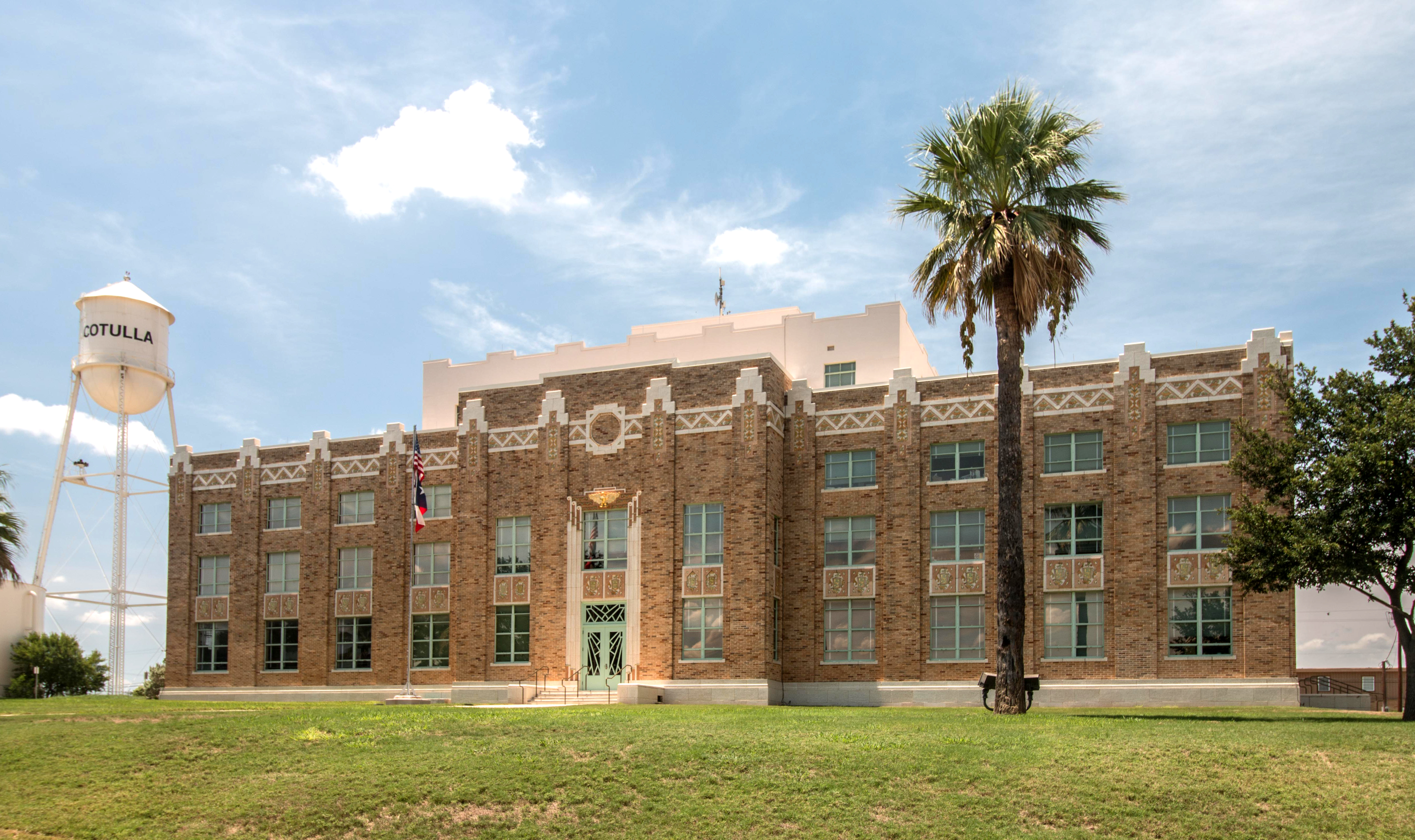
- The La Salle County Courthouse in Cotulla has undergone extensive renovation (2018).

- Location within the U.S. state of Texas
- Coordinates: 28°20′N 99°06′W
- Country: United States
- State: Texas
- Founded: 1880
- Named for: René-Robert Cavelier, Sieur de La Salle
- Seat: Cotulla
- Largest city: Cotulla

Area
  - Total: 1,494 sq mi (3,870 km^{2})
  - Land: 1,487 sq mi (3,850 km^{2})
  - Water: 7.5 sq mi (19 km^{2}) 0.5%

Population (2020)
  - Total: 6,664
  - Estimate (2025): 6,517 ▼
  - Density: 4.5/sq mi (1.7/km^{2})
- Time zone: UTC−6 (Central)
  - Summer (DST): UTC−5 (CDT)
- Congressional district: 23rd
- Website: www.co.la-salle.tx.us

La Salle County is a county in Texas. As of the 2020 census, its population was 6,664. Its county seat is Cotulla. The county was created in 1858 and later organized in 1880. It is named for René-Robert Cavelier, Sieur de La Salle, a 17th-century French explorer.

== History ==
=== Early history ===
The area of present-day La Salle County was occupied by the Coahuiltecan Indians until the 18th century, when they were squeezed out by the Spanish from the south and the Apache from the north. After the Mexican War of Independence, the Mexican government used land grants to encourage settlement, but very few settled in the area. By 1836, the area was entirely populated by Indians.

Between the Texas Revolution and the Mexican War, the area of present-day La Salle County lay in the disputed area between the Rio Grande and the Nueces River. Desperadoes ruled the area, as neither the Mexican government nor the Republic of Texas could gain control. The Treaty of Guadalupe Hidalgo assigned the Nueces Strip to Texas in 1848, but outlaws and hostile Indians delayed settlement of the area.

La Salle County was officially formed in 1858 from the Bexar District. The first settlements were established on the road from Laredo to San Antonio. In 1852, the Army established Fort Ewell near present-day Artesia Wells, where the road crossed the Nueces River, to protect travelers on the road. The fort was abandoned in 1854, and the remaining inhabitants moved to the settlement of Guajoco, located one and a half miles from the fort. By 1871, around 60 people lived in Guajoco, mostly of Mexican descent.

In 1856, William A. Waugh of Ohio established a ranch where the San Antonio–Laredo road crossed Cibolo Creek. His ranch headquarters became a stopping point for travelers, and in 1879, a post office was established there with the name Waugh's Rancho. Iuka, an early settlement located 8 miles west of present-day Cotulla, was established in 1868 by several families and served as a stage stop and marketplace for cattle buyers. The settlement established a post office in 1880. In 1870, the population of La Salle County was 69, and by 1880, it was 789.

La Salle County was formally organized in 1880 and Stuart's Rancho, near Guajoco, was designated the county seat. In the early 1880s, the International-Great Northern Railroad laid tracks to the county. Around this time, outlaws were gradually eliminated from the area, and the last Indian raid, involving a large band of about 40 Kickapoo, Seminole, and Lipan Apache occurred in April of 1878, resulting in the deaths of at least 18 settlers. These changes help bring stability to the county.

With the arrival of the railroads, settlements such as Iuka and Guajoco were abandoned as inhabitants moved near the railroad tracks. Polish immigrant Joseph Cotulla arrived in La Salle County in 1868 and eventually established a large ranching operation. In 1881, Cotulla donated 120 acres of his land to the railroad for the townsite of Cotulla, and the railroad built a depot there in 1882. While Cotulla continued to develop his town, Iuka's postmaster, Jesse Laxton, developed a townsite just across the tracks named La Salle. La Salle was granted a post office in 1881, and in 1882, was designated the temporary county seat. However, Cotulla became the county seat by special election in 1883.

== Geography ==
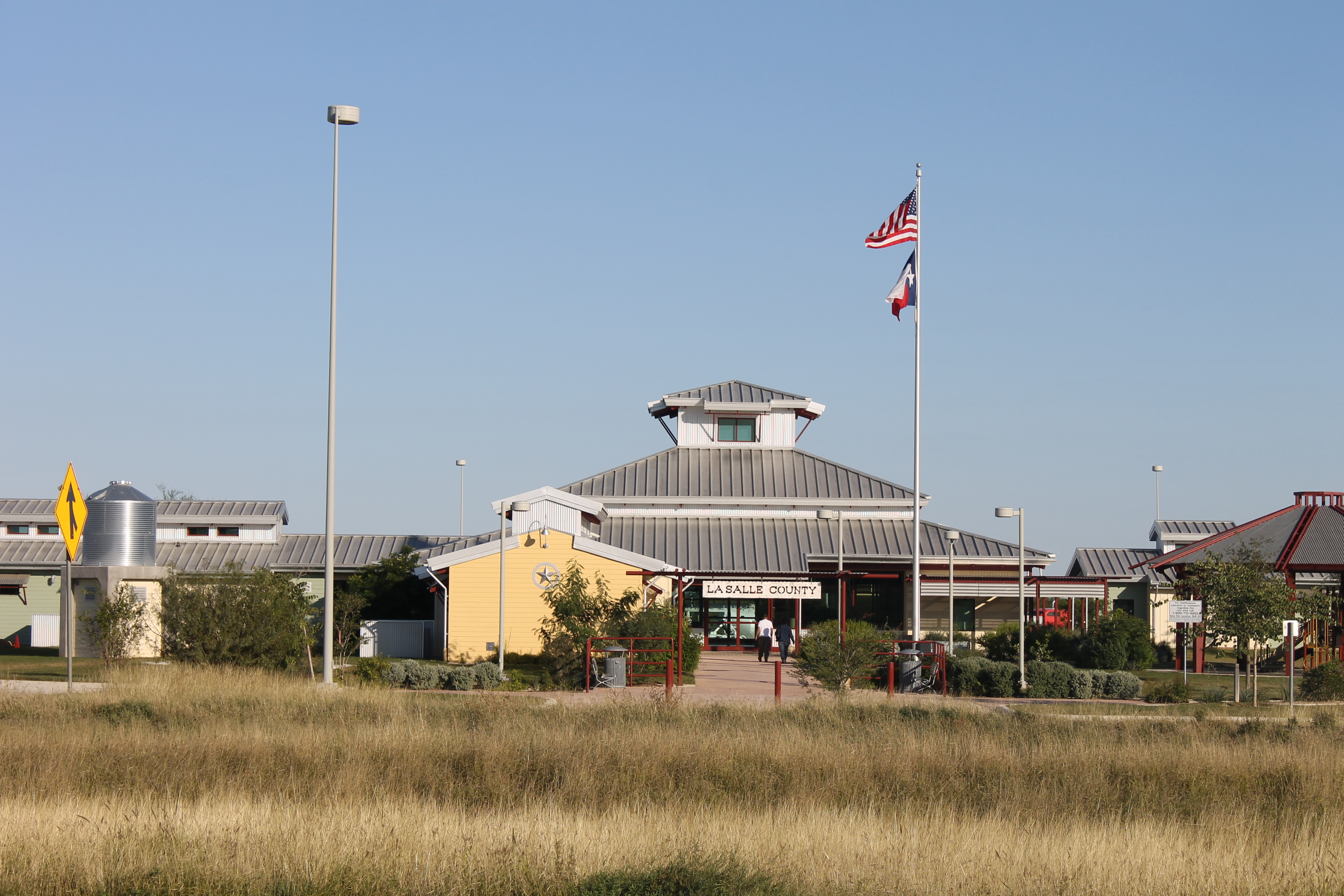
La Salle County highway visitor center on Interstate 35 south of Cotulla (November 2014)

According to the U.S. Census Bureau, the county has a total area of 1,494 square miles (3,870 km^{2}), of which 7.5 square miles (19 km^{2}) (0.5%) are covered by water.

=== Major highways ===
- I-35
- I-35 BL
- I-35 BL
- SH 44
- SH 97
- FM 133
- FM 468
- FM 469
- FM 624
- FM 1582

=== Adjacent counties ===
- Frio County (north)
- Atascosa County (northeast)
- McMullen County (east)
- Webb County (south)
- Dimmit County (west)
- Zavala County (northwest)

== Demographics ==
Historical population
Census	Pop.	Note	%±
1870	69		—
1880	789		1,043.5%
1890	2,139		171.1%
1900	2,303		7.7%
1910	4,747		106.1%
1920	4,821		1.6%
1930	8,228		70.7%
1940	8,003		−2.7%
1950	7,485		−6.5%
1960	5,972		−20.2%
1970	5,014		−16.0%
1980	5,514		10.0%
1990	5,254		−4.7%
2000	5,866		11.6%
2010	6,886		17.4%
2020	6,664		−3.2%
2025 (est.)	6,517	▼	−2.2%
U.S. Decennial Census; 1850–2010 2010–2014

=== Racial and ethnic composition ===
La Salle County, Texas – Racial and ethnic composition Note: the US Census treats Hispanic/Latino as an ethnic category. This table excludes Latinos from the racial categories and assigns them to a separate category. Hispanics/Latinos may be of any race.
Race / Ethnicity (NH = Non-Hispanic)	Pop 1980	Pop 1990	Pop 2000	Pop 2010	Pop 2020	% 1980	% 1990	% 2000	% 2010	% 2020
White alone (NH)	1,431	1,102	1,114	894	1,467	25.95%	20.97%	18.99%	12.98%	22.01%
Black or African American alone (NH)	4	52	192	18	221	0.07%	0.99%	3.27%	0.26%	3.32%
Native American or Alaska Native alone (NH)	4	6	5	25	3	0.07%	0.11%	0.09%	0.36%	0.05%
Asian alone (NH)	6	5	18	6	4	0.11%	0.10%	0.31%	0.09%	0.06%
Native Hawaiian or Pacific Islander alone (NH)	x	x	0	0	0	x	x	0.00%	0.00%	0.00%
Other race alone (NH)	5	21	2	5	5	0.09%	0.40%	0.03%	0.07%	0.08%
Mixed race or Multiracial (NH)	x	x	11	18	56	x	x	0.19%	0.26%	0.84%
Hispanic or Latino (any race)	4,064	4,068	4,524	5,920	4,908	73.70%	77.43%	77.12%	85.97%	73.65%
Total	5,514	5,254	5,866	6,886	6,664	100.00%	100.00%	100.00%	100.00%	100.00%

=== 2020 census ===
As of the 2020 census, the county had a population of 6,664. The median age was 39.7 years. 20.9% of residents were under the age of 18 and 17.4% of residents were 65 years of age or older. For every 100 females there were 138.7 males, and for every 100 females age 18 and over there were 152.3 males age 18 and over.

The racial makeup of the county was 47.9% White, 3.5% Black or African American, 0.3% American Indian and Alaska Native, 0.1% Asian, <0.1% Native Hawaiian and Pacific Islander, 14.0% from some other race, and 34.3% from two or more races. Hispanic or Latino residents of any race comprised 73.6% of the population.

<0.1% of residents lived in urban areas, while 100.0% lived in rural areas.

There were 1,857 households in the county, of which 34.7% had children under the age of 18 living in them. Of all households, 42.3% were married-couple households, 19.0% were households with a male householder and no spouse or partner present, and 31.6% were households with a female householder and no spouse or partner present. About 27.0% of all households were made up of individuals and 12.9% had someone living alone who was 65 years of age or older.

There were 2,582 housing units, of which 28.1% were vacant. Among occupied housing units, 71.3% were owner-occupied and 28.7% were renter-occupied. The homeowner vacancy rate was 1.7% and the rental vacancy rate was 24.3%.

=== 2000 census ===
As of the census of 2000, 5,866 people, 1,819 households, and 1,351 were families residing in the county. The population density was 4 people/mi^{2} (1.5 people/km^{2}). The 2,436 housing units averaged 2 units per square mile (0.77/km^{2}). The racial makeup of the county was 81.47% White, 3.55% African American, 0.34% Native American, 0.31% Asian, 12.21% from other races, and 2.13% from two or more races. About 77.12% of the population were Hispanic or Latino of any race.

Of the 1,819 households, 37.7% had children under the age of 18 living with them, 54.7% were married couples living together, 15.4% had a female householder with no husband present, and 25.7% were not families. About 22.9% of all households were made up of individuals, and 12.0% had someone living alone who was 65 years of age or older. The average household size was 2.89, and the average family size was 3.45.

In the county, the age distribution was 29.4% under 18, 10.0% from 18 to 24, 27.7% from 25 to 44, 21.3% from 45 to 64, and 11.6% who were 65 or older. The median age was 33 years. For every 100 females, there were 113.50 males. For every 100 females age 18 and over, there were 121.40 males.

The median income for a household in the county was $21,857, and for a family was $25,494. Males had a median income of $20,856 versus $17,339 for females. The per capita income for the county was $9,692. About 28.20% of families and 29.80% of the population were below the poverty line, including 38.50% of those under age 18 and 24.80% of those age 65 or over. The county's per capita income makes it one of the poorest counties in the United States, yet the average income of the top 1% highest earners in the county was $6,021,357, one of the highest in the United States.

== Education ==
Most of La Salle County is served by the Cotulla Independent School District. The Dilley Independent School District serves a small portion of northwestern La Salle County.

The designated community college is Southwest Texas Junior College.

== Communities ==
=== Cities ===
- Cotulla (county seat)
- Encinal

=== Census-designated place ===
- Fowlerton

=== Unincorporated communities ===
- Artesia Wells
- Los Angeles
- Millett

=== Ghost town ===
- Dull

== Notable people ==
- O. Henry, the famous short-story writer, lived and worked on a sheep ranch in La Salle County from 1882 to 1884 before settling in Austin as a pharmacist and bank teller.
- Ray Keck, the fifth and current president of Texas A&M International University in Laredo, was born in San Antonio and reared in Cotulla, where his father, Ray Keck, Jr., was president of Stockmen's National Bank.
- Lyndon B. Johnson, President of the United States, taught elementary school in Cotulla in 1928.

== Politics ==
For most of its history, La Salle County was a solid Democratic stronghold like most of South Texas. Before 2020, the county had voted for the Republican candidate only once in over a hundred years, delivering 65% of the vote to Richard Nixon during his landslide victory in 1972. In recent years, however, La Salle County has skewed significantly more Republican, as Donald Trump flipped the county in 2020 and further expanded his margin of victory in 2024. This political realignment is consistent with shifting trends among Hispanic voters in South Texas.

United States presidential election results for La Salle County, Texas
Year	Republican		Democratic		Third party(ies)	
Year	No.	%	No.	%	No.	%
1912	21	5.10%	339	82.28%	52	12.62%
1916	40	10.42%	340	88.54%	4	1.04%
1920	53	16.88%	252	80.25%	9	2.87%
1924	73	13.49%	458	84.66%	10	1.85%
1928	327	40.57%	479	59.43%	0	0.00%
1932	92	10.17%	810	89.50%	3	0.33%
1936	74	9.51%	704	90.49%	0	0.00%
1940	112	13.69%	706	86.31%	0	0.00%
1944	127	14.77%	692	80.47%	41	4.77%
1948	135	14.79%	719	78.75%	59	6.46%
1952	565	40.88%	816	59.04%	1	0.07%
1956	449	43.85%	574	56.05%	1	0.10%
1960	326	31.17%	718	68.64%	2	0.19%
1964	223	18.40%	988	81.52%	1	0.08%
1968	324	29.97%	645	59.67%	112	10.36%
1972	1,073	65.11%	567	34.41%	8	0.49%
1976	677	34.14%	1,294	65.25%	12	0.61%
1980	773	34.39%	1,442	64.15%	33	1.47%
1984	1,007	40.06%	1,504	59.82%	3	0.12%
1988	693	29.46%	1,651	70.20%	8	0.34%
1992	586	25.27%	1,522	65.63%	211	9.10%
1996	570	26.10%	1,522	69.69%	92	4.21%
2000	731	36.30%	1,266	62.86%	17	0.84%
2004	989	44.35%	1,229	55.11%	12	0.54%
2008	714	40.20%	1,052	59.23%	10	0.56%
2012	669	40.64%	965	58.63%	12	0.73%
2016	872	42.35%	1,129	54.83%	58	2.82%
2020	1,335	55.49%	1,052	43.72%	19	0.79%
2024	1,417	60.04%	933	39.53%	10	0.42%

United States Senate election results for La Salle County, Texas1
Year	Republican		Democratic		Third party(ies)	
Year	No.	%	No.	%	No.	%
2024	1,088	51.52%	956	45.27%	68	3.22%

United States Senate election results for La Salle County, Texas2
Year	Republican		Democratic		Third party(ies)	
Year	No.	%	No.	%	No.	%
2020	1,082	50.40%	1,005	46.81%	60	2.79%

Texas Gubernatorial election results for La Salle County
Year	Republican		Democratic		Third party(ies)	
Year	No.	%	No.	%	No.	%
2022	761	52.96%	662	46.07%	14	0.97%

== See also ==
- National Register of Historic Places in La Salle County, Texas
- Recorded Texas Historic Landmarks in La Salle County
- Winter Garden Region
