= Cotulla, Texas =

- City
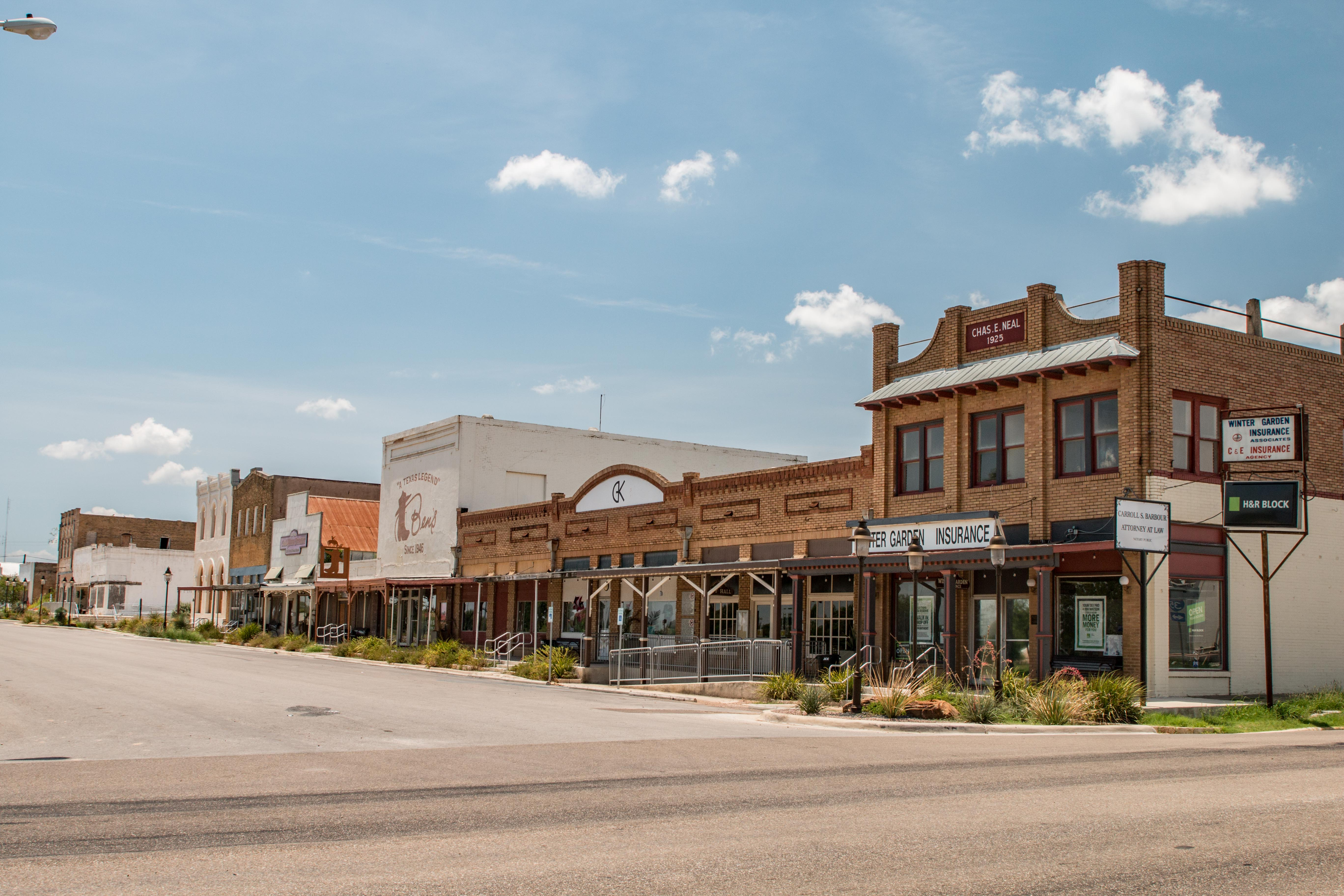
- Downtown Cotulla

- Location within Texas Location within the United States
- Coordinates: 28°26′3″N 99°14′11″W
- Country: United States
- State: Texas
- County: La Salle

Area
  - Total: 2.01 sq mi (5.21 km^{2})
  - Land: 2.01 sq mi (5.21 km^{2})
  - Water: 0 sq mi (0.00 km^{2})
- Elevation: 440 ft (130 m)

Population (2020)
  - Total: 3,718
  - Density: 1,850/sq mi (714/km^{2})
- Time zone: UTC-6 (Central (CST))
  - Summer (DST): UTC-5 (CDT)
- ZIP codes: 78001, 78014
- Area code: 830
- FIPS code: 48-17216
- GNIS feature ID: 2410247
- Website: https://www.cityofcotulla.org/

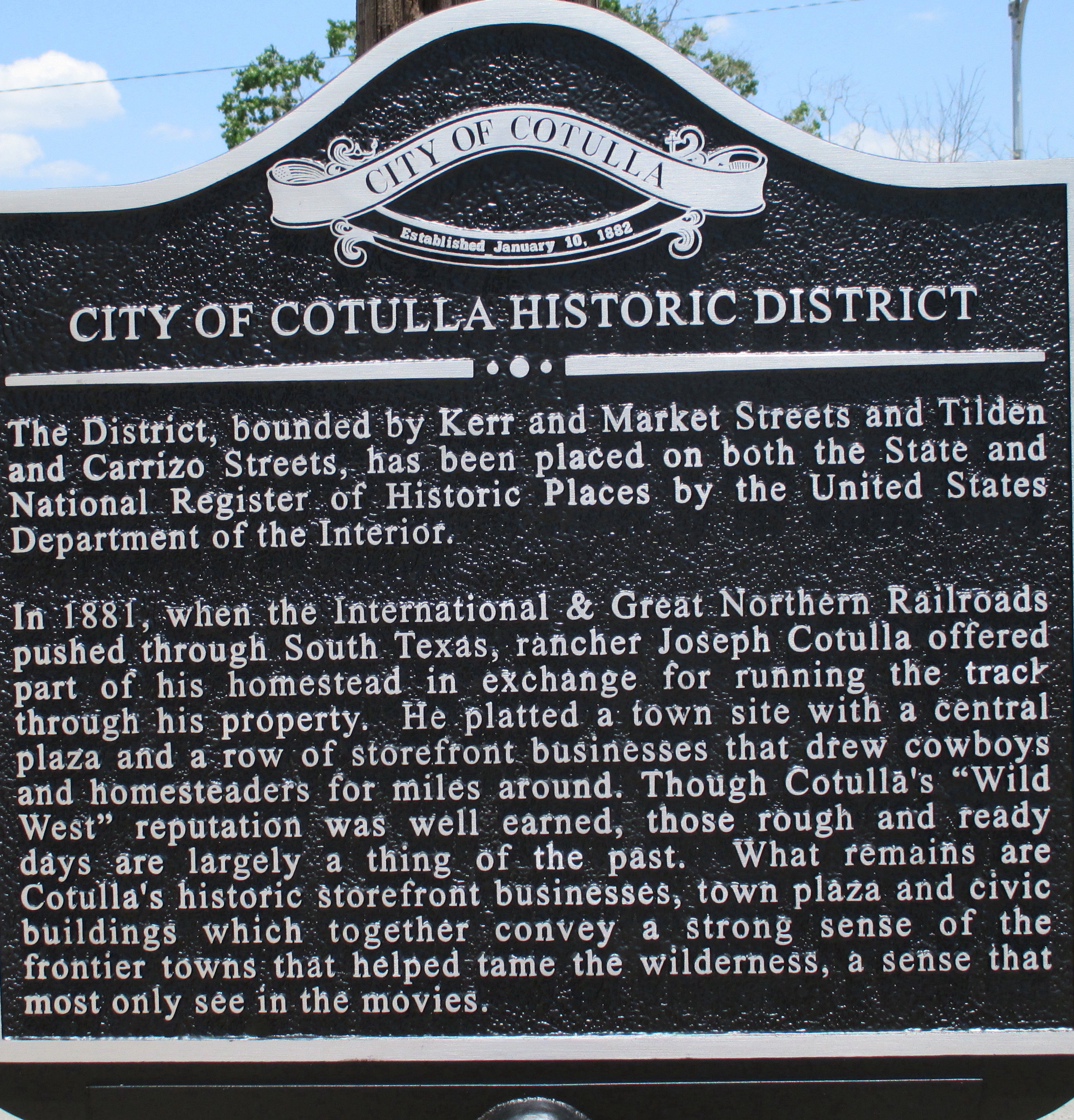
Cotulla Historic District sign downtown (erected 2013)

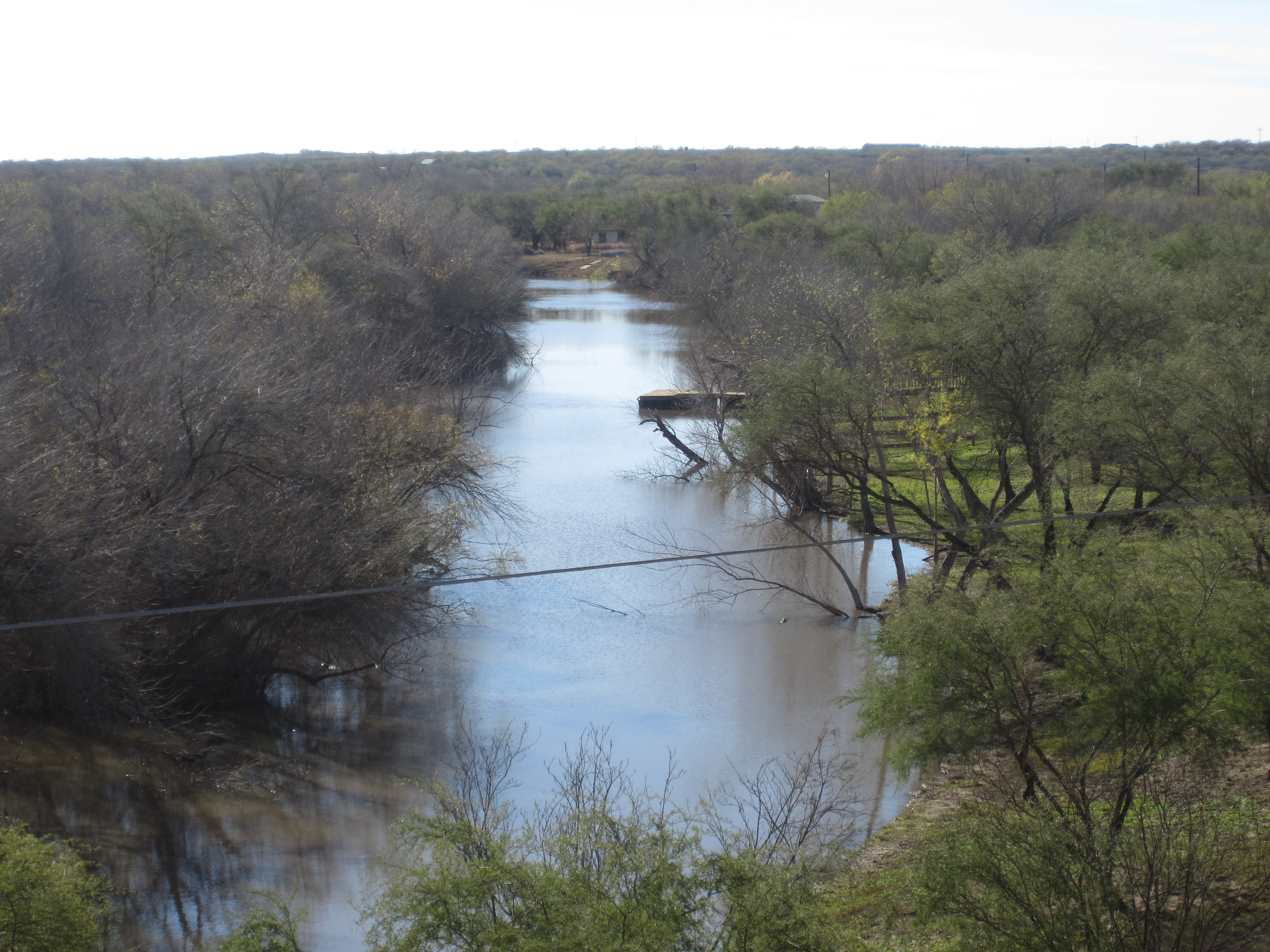
The Nueces River

Cotulla (/kəˈtjuːlə/ kə-TEW-lə) is a city in and the county seat of La Salle County, Texas, United States. Its population was 3,718 as of the 2020 census.

== History ==
Immigrant Joseph Cotulla, who was reared in Silesia, then a part of Prussia, migrated to the United States in the 1850s. He joined the Union Army in Brownsville, Texas. He lived in Atascosa County, but arrived in La Salle County in 1868 to establish what became a large ranching operation. After learning that the International-Great Northern Railroad intended to lay tracks in La Salle County, he worked to establish the town that bears his name.

In 1881, Cotulla donated 120 acres of his land to the railroad, and in 1882, a depot was constructed there. In 1883, the town was granted a post office. The same year, Cotulla became the county seat by special election.

In 1928, after completing his freshman year at Southwest Texas State Teachers College, Lyndon Baines Johnson taught 5th, 6th, and 7th graders at the Welhausen School. He commented when he returned in 1965:

I shall never forget the faces of the boys and the girls in that little Welhausen Mexican School, and I remember even yet the pain of realizing and knowing then that college was closed to practically every one of those children because they were too poor. And I think it was then that I made up my mind that this Nation could never rest while the door to knowledge remained closed to any American. So here, today, back on the campus of my youth, that door is swinging open far wider than it ever did before.

Joseph Cotulla's great-grandson, William Lawrence Cotulla (born around 1936), a former storekeeper in Cotulla, is a rancher in La Salle, Dimmit, and Webb Counties. In a 2013 interview with the Laredo Morning Times, William Cotulla noted the community of his birth has changed completely in less than 80 years, having gone through several phases, beginning with emphasis on farming, then ranching, thereafter hunting leases, and now petroleum and natural gas through the Eagle Ford Shale boom. With declining gasoline prices, though, the Eagle Ford boom took a sharp downturn by the fall of 2015.

In 1973, two railroad locomotives collided in Cotulla, and three people were killed as a result. In 2008, the area around Cotulla burned in a huge grass fire.

== Geography ==
Cotulla is located at 28°26′3″N 99°14′11″W (28.434144, –99.236343). This is 81 mi (147 km) southwest of San Antonio.

According to the United States Census Bureau, the city has a total area of 2.0 square miles (5.2 km^{2}), all land. The Nueces River flows through southern Cotulla in a southeastward direction to the Gulf of Mexico, near Corpus Christi.

== Climate ==
Cotulla has a hot semi-arid climate (Köppen: BSh) with very hot summers and mild winters. The all-time record high of 116 °F (47 °C) was recorded on June 28th, 1902 and June 19th & 21st, 2023, whilst the all-time record low of 16 °F (-9 °C) was recorded on January 9th, 2010 and February 18th, 2021.

Climate data for Cotulla, Texas (Cotulla–La Salle County Airport), 1991–2020 normals, extremes 1901–present
Month	Jan	Feb	Mar	Apr	May	Jun	Jul	Aug	Sep	Oct	Nov	Dec	Year
Record high °F (°C)	94 (34)	100 (38)	106 (41)	106 (41)	109 (43)	116 (47)	111 (44)	111 (44)	112 (44)	104 (40)	98 (37)	95 (35)	116 (47)
Mean maximum °F (°C)	85.9 (29.9)	90.3 (32.4)	93.6 (34.2)	99.3 (37.4)	103.2 (39.6)	105.0 (40.6)	104.5 (40.3)	106.3 (41.3)	102.4 (39.1)	97.1 (36.2)	89.7 (32.1)	84.7 (29.3)	108.1 (42.3)
Mean daily maximum °F (°C)	67.4 (19.7)	73.6 (23.1)	79.7 (26.5)	86.0 (30.0)	92.8 (33.8)	97.9 (36.6)	99.2 (37.3)	100.3 (37.9)	93.9 (34.4)	86.6 (30.3)	75.7 (24.3)	68.7 (20.4)	85.2 (29.5)
Daily mean °F (°C)	55.7 (13.2)	60.9 (16.1)	67.2 (19.6)	73.4 (23.0)	80.7 (27.1)	85.7 (29.8)	87.0 (30.6)	87.7 (30.9)	82.4 (28.0)	74.7 (23.7)	64.0 (17.8)	56.8 (13.8)	73.0 (22.8)
Mean daily minimum °F (°C)	43.9 (6.6)	48.3 (9.1)	54.8 (12.7)	60.7 (15.9)	68.6 (20.3)	73.6 (23.1)	74.7 (23.7)	75.0 (23.9)	70.8 (21.6)	62.8 (17.1)	52.4 (11.3)	44.9 (7.2)	60.9 (16.0)
Mean minimum °F (°C)	27.9 (−2.3)	30.7 (−0.7)	35.9 (2.2)	44.0 (6.7)	54.8 (12.7)	68.0 (20.0)	70.1 (21.2)	70.5 (21.4)	60.1 (15.6)	42.9 (6.1)	33.1 (0.6)	28.6 (−1.9)	25.3 (−3.7)
Record low °F (°C)	16 (−9)	16 (−9)	23 (−5)	36 (2)	44 (7)	56 (13)	62 (17)	63 (17)	50 (10)	35 (2)	26 (−3)	20 (−7)	16 (−9)
Average precipitation inches (mm)	0.85 (22)	1.26 (32)	1.57 (40)	1.33 (34)	3.01 (76)	2.20 (56)	2.26 (57)	1.67 (42)	2.98 (76)	2.39 (61)	1.15 (29)	1.01 (26)	21.68 (551)
Average precipitation days (≥ 0.01 in)	6.1	5.7	5.4	4.9	6.3	4.8	5.9	3.5	7.1	4.6	4.4	6.0	64.7
Source 1: NOAA
Source 2: National Weather Service

== Demographics ==
Historical population
Census	Pop.	Note	%±
1890	672		—
1910	1,880		—
1920	1,058		−43.7%
1930	3,175		200.1%
1940	3,633		14.4%
1950	4,418		21.6%
1960	3,960		−10.4%
1970	3,415		−13.8%
1980	3,912		14.6%
1990	3,694		−5.6%
2000	3,614		−2.2%
2010	3,603		−0.3%
2020	3,718		3.2%
U.S. Decennial Census

=== 2020 census ===
As of the 2020 census, 3,718 people, 1,294 households, and 1,110 families resided in the city. The median age was 36.9 years. 27.3% of residents were under the age of 18 and 17.9% of residents were 65 years of age or older. For every 100 females there were 89.5 males, and for every 100 females age 18 and over there were 88.0 males age 18 and over.

0.0% of residents lived in urban areas, while 100.0% lived in rural areas.

There were 1,294 households in Cotulla, of which 34.1% had children under the age of 18 living in them. Of all households, 37.9% were married-couple households, 18.9% were households with a male householder and no spouse or partner present, and 34.9% were households with a female householder and no spouse or partner present. About 28.0% of all households were made up of individuals and 12.7% had someone living alone who was 65 years of age or older.

There were 1,683 housing units, of which 23.1% were vacant. The homeowner vacancy rate was 1.2% and the rental vacancy rate was 20.0%.

Racial composition as of the 2020 census
Race	Number	Percent
White	1,555	41.8%
Black or African American	17	0.5%
American Indian and Alaska Native	5	0.1%
Asian	4	0.1%
Native Hawaiian and Other Pacific Islander	0	0.0%
Some other race	429	11.5%
Two or more races	1,708	45.9%
Hispanic or Latino (of any race)	3,244	87.3%

=== 2000 census ===
As of the census of 2000, 3,614 people, 1,208 households, and 901 families were residing in the city. The population density was 1,831.8 people per mi^{2} (708.3/km^{2}). The 1,504 housing units averaged 762.3 per mi^{2} (294.8/km^{2}). The racial makeup of the city was 83.45% White, 0.64% African American, 0.39% Native American, 0.50% Asian, 12.67% from other races, and 2.35% from two or more races. Hispanics or Latinos of any race were 83.56% of the population.

Of the 1,208 households, 39.0% had children under 18 living with them, 52.7% were married couples living together, 17.8% had a female householder with no husband present, and 25.4% were not families. About 22.6% of all households were made up of individuals, and 11.8% had someone living alone who was 65 or older. The average household size was 2.95, and the average family size was 3.50.

In the city, the age distribution was 33.6% under 18, 8.6% from 18 to 24, 24.0% from 25 to 44, 21.3% from 45 to 64, and 12.5% who were 65 or older. The median age was 32 years. For every 100 females, there were 90.2 males. For every 100 females 18 and over, there were 87.2 males.

The median income for a household in the city was $23,250 and for a family was $25,951. Males had a median income of $21,199 versus $17,415 for females. The per capita income for the city was $10,856. About 27.9% of families and 30.1% of the population were below the poverty line, including 39.0% of those under age 18 and 28.1% of those age 65 or over.

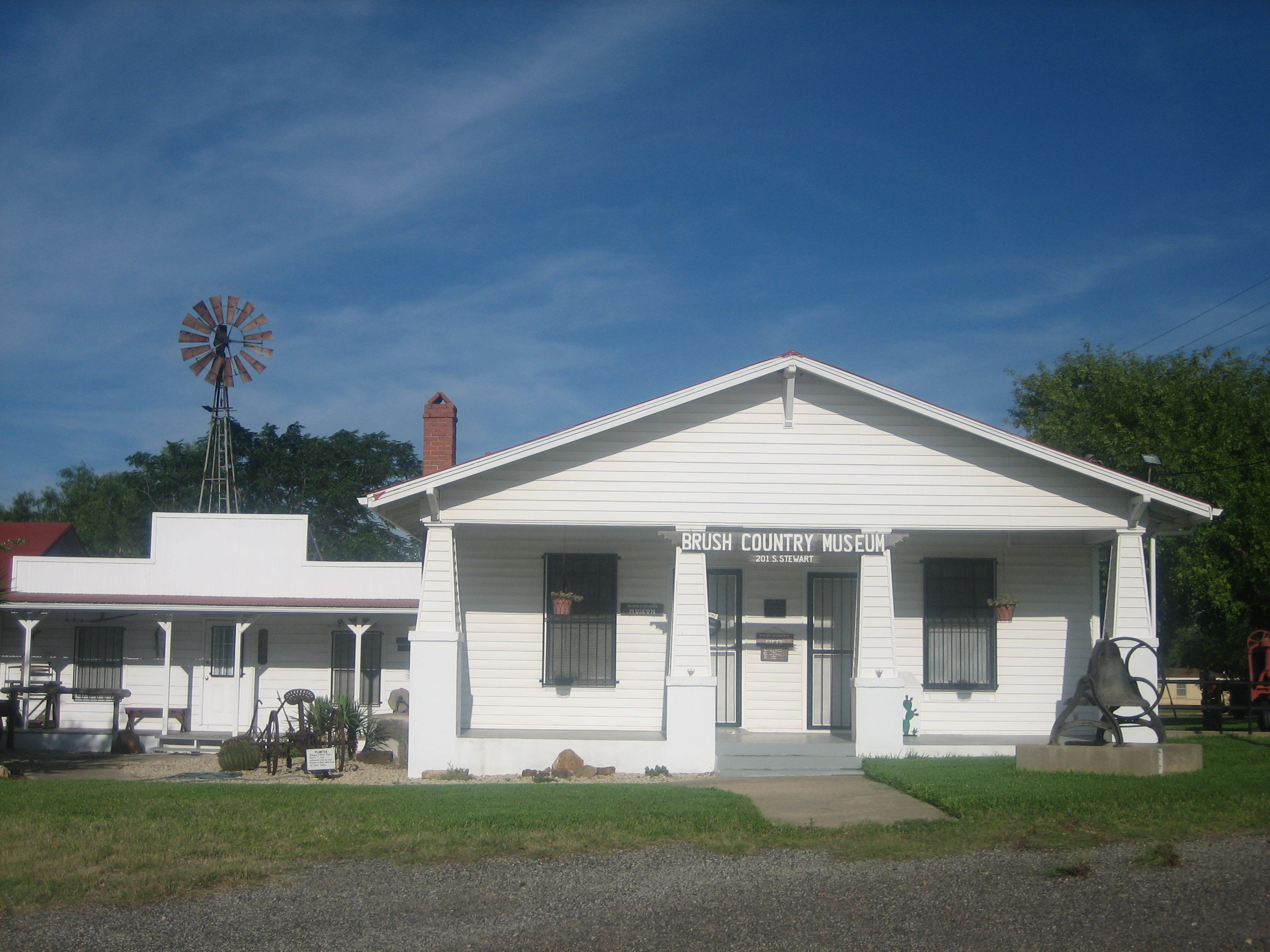
The Brush Country Museum in Cotulla preserves regional history.

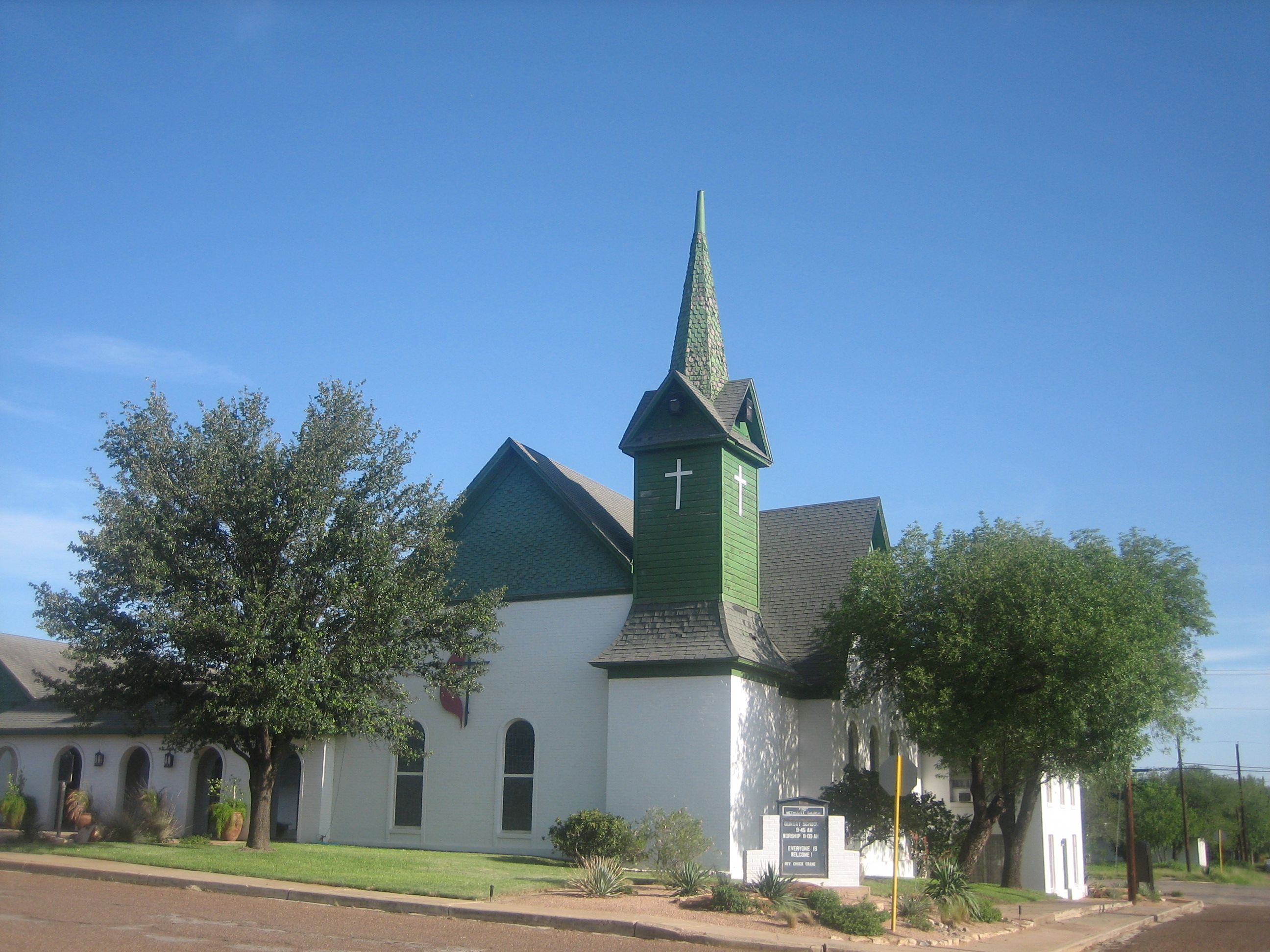
First United Methodist Church of Cotulla

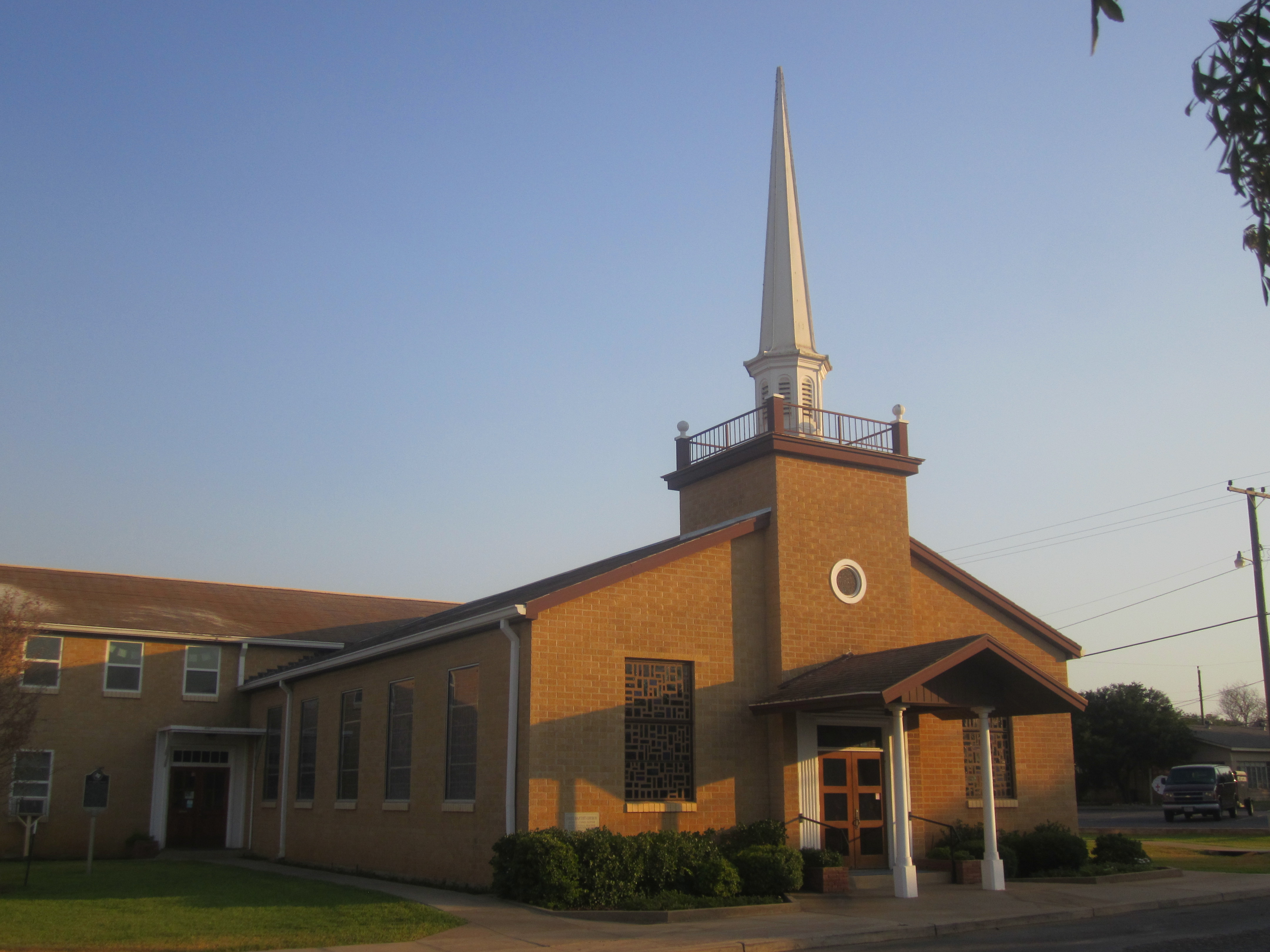
The First Baptist Church of Cotulla was established in the 1880s. The current sanctuary opened in 1948.

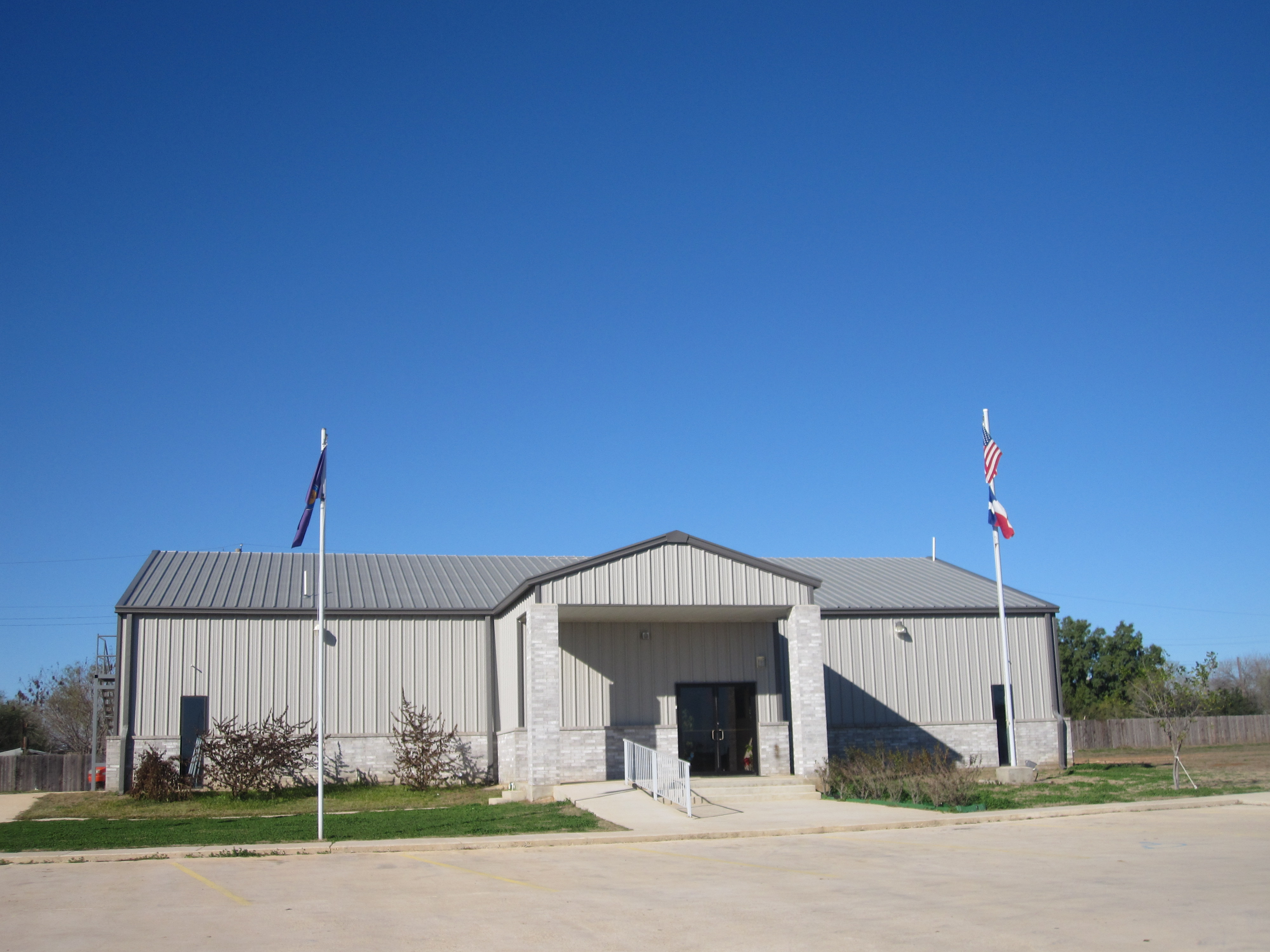
The Prevailing Word Church (nondenominational) in Cotulla

== Law and government ==
Cotulla is governed by a five-member city council and a mayor. The La Salle County Courthouse in downtown Cotulla has undergone extensive renovation.

== Education ==
- Cotulla is within the Cotulla Independent School District. Cotulla High School, with grades 9–12, is located east of town. The modern structure is divided into several noncontiguous units.

== Notable people ==
- Josh Beckett, retired Major League Baseball pitcher, owns Herradura Ranch, a 7,000-acre (28 km^{2}) deer-hunting enclave located about 28 miles (45 km) from Cotulla
- Jeff Bezos, founder and CEO of Amazon.com, was the wealthiest person in the world, as of December 2017. His maternal ancestors were settlers who lived in Texas. Over the generations, the family acquired a 25,000-acre (100 km^{2}) ranch in Cotulla.
- John Lewis Gaddis, known as the "Dean of Cold War Historians", was born in Cotulla in 1941.
- O. Henry, the short story writer, lived on a sheep ranch near Cotulla in the early 1880s with the successful goal of improving his health in the dry climate.
- Lyndon B. Johnson, U.S. President, taught public school in Cotulla from 1928 to 1929.
- Hailey Kinsel, three-time world champion barrel racer, was born and raised on her parents' cattle ranch near Cotulla.
- Phil Lyne, a rodeo cowboy and 1979 ProRodeo Hall of Fame inductee, resided in Cotulla.
- J.B. Mauney, an American former professional rodeo cowboy who specialized in bull riding, competed in the Professional Bull Riders and Professional Rodeo Cowboys Association, and was a two-time PBR World Champion in 2013 and 2015, resided in Cotulla.
- Kevin Patrick Yeary, judge of the Texas Court of Criminal Appeals, was born in Cotulla and raised in Laredo.
