= Wiedeville, Texas =

- Unincorporated community
- Location within Texas Location within the United States
- Coordinates: 30°13′10″N 96°20′25″W
- Country: United States
- State: Texas
- County: Washington
- Elevation: 328 ft (100 m)
- Time zone: UTC-6 (Central (CST))
  - Summer (DST): UTC-5 (CDT)
- Area code: 979
- GNIS feature ID: 1379273

Wiedeville is an unincorporated community in Washington County, Texas, United States. It is located within the Greater Houston metropolitan area.

== Geography ==
Wiedeville is located one mile from Farm to Market Road 50 and 5 mi (8.0 km) northeast of Brenham in central Washington County. It is also on Farm to Market Road 66.

== Education ==
Today, the community is served by the Brenham Independent School District.
