= William Penn, Texas =

- Unincorporated community
- Location within Texas Location within the United States
- Coordinates: 30°18′55″N 96°16′56″W
- Country: United States
- State: Texas
- County: Washington
- Elevation: 305 ft (93 m)
- Time zone: UTC-6 (Central (CST))
  - Summer (DST): UTC-5 (CDT)
- Area code: 979
- GNIS feature ID: 1379277

William Penn is an unincorporated community in Washington County, Texas, United States. According to the Handbook of Texas, the community had a population of 100 in 2000. It is located within the Greater Houston metropolitan area.

== History ==
The location is three miles south of Hidalgo Bluffs, where the Republic of Texas' Hidalgo town once stood along the Brazos River. Isaac Jackson had received a Mexican land grant for it initially. John G. Pitts, another Old Three Hundred member, bought it in 1839. John C. Eldridge, a Virginian who arrived in the area in 1849, gave it the name "William Penn" in honor of the steamship that made port calls at the adjacent ports of Warren and Washington in the 1850s.

Eldridge House at William Penn was built by early Texas builder Robert Hallum around 1850. It is the only Hallum-designed home that is still standing. The home was a hub of activity until 1903, when German immigrant Henry Muegge bought it.

William Penn was formerly a plantation community made up of Blacks and Anglo-Americans. German immigrants moved in before the Civil War; they eventually rose to prominence as an ethnic group.

At William Penn, Bethlehem Evangelical Lutheran Church was established in 1860. The current church structure was finished in 1893, while the cemetery there was established in 1861.

William Penn had a post office by 1873.

A conference of representatives from the Texas and Missouri Lutheran Synods was hosted at William Penn in 1878 by Rev. Peter Klindworth.

In 1884, William Penn's economy was entirely based on agriculture, but by 1890, it had grown to include a commercial sector and a wagonmaking industry. Around 1914, the opening of two cotton gins boosted the local economy. The last operational cotton gin in Washington County in 1988 was Sommer's Gin, which was run by five generations of Sommers. It was located close to William Penn. However, ranching was the town's main industry in the late 1980s.

The population increased from thirty in 1884 to a peak of 127 in 1904.

In 1916, the post office was closed.

In 1930, there were 50 residents; in 1952, there were 100, and the town had seven rated businesses. Despite the decline in commerce after 1970, William Penn's population stayed around 100 from 1990 to 2000. The population went down to 40 in 2010.

== Geography ==
William Penn is located at the intersection of Farm to Market Road 390 and County Road 75 on Jackson Creek, approximately 12 miles northeast of Brenham.

== Education ==
A school was organized by the local church congregation in 1876. The Brenham Independent School District serves area students.

== Notable people ==
- Bedford G. Guy, state legislator during reconstruction
- Gus Franklin Mutscher, state legislator

== See also ==
- Farm to Market Road 50
