= Bedford G. Guy =

American politician (1841–1915)

Bedford Green Guy (August 4, 1841 – July 3, 1915) was an American farmer and state legislator in Texas. He served from 1879 to 1881 as a member of the Greenback Party, although other sources have him listed as Republican. He represented Washington County, Texas.

He was initially a Republican nominee, and stated that he did not belong to either the left or right wings of the radical party.

He was born in Pittsylvania County, Virginia. He moved to Texas in 1869. Elected councilman in the Texas House of Councils. He lived in William Penn, Texas. He died in Waco, Texas.

== See also ==
- African American officeholders from the end of the Civil War until before 1900
