= Mill Creek, Texas =

- Unincorporated community
- Location within Texas Location within the United States
- Coordinates: 30°9′20″N 96°29′36″W
- Country: United States
- State: Texas
- County: Washington
- Elevation: 299 ft (91 m)
- Time zone: UTC-6 (Central (CST))
  - Summer (DST): UTC-5 (CDT)
- Area code: 979
- GNIS feature ID: 1378682

Mill Creek is an unincorporated community in Washington County, Texas, United States. According to the Handbook of Texas, the community had a population of 40 in 2000. It is located within the Greater Houston metropolitan area.

== Geography ==
Mill Creek is located on Farm to Market Road 28 on the Southern Pacific Railroad, 3/4 of a mile from Lake Lange and 5.5 mi (8.9 km) from Brenham in southwestern Washington County.

== Education ==
Today, the community is served by the Brenham Independent School District.

== See also ==
- I've Been Everywhere
