= Greenvine, Texas =

- Unincorporated community
- Location within Texas Location within the United States
- Coordinates: 30°06′54″N 96°33′30″W
- Country: United States
- State: Texas
- County: Washington
- Elevation: 440 ft (130 m)
- Time zone: UTC-6 (Central (CST))
  - Summer (DST): UTC-5 (CDT)
- Area code: 979
- GNIS feature ID: 1336989

Greenvine is an unincorporated community in southwestern Washington County, Texas, United States. According to the Handbook of Texas, the community had a population of 35 in 2000. It is located within the Greater Houston metropolitan area.

== Geography ==
Greenvine is located on FM 2502 near Pond Creek, 5 mi (8.0 km) south of Burton and 10 mi (16 km) southwest of Brenham in southern Washington County.

== Education ==
Greenvine had its own school in 1884. Since 1943, the community has been served by the Burton Independent School District.
