= Goodwill, Texas =

Goodwill
- Ghost town
- Location within Texas Location within the United States
- Coordinates: 30.242°N 96.185°W
- Country: United States
- State: Texas
- County: Washington
- Named after: Goodwill Church

Goodwill is an unincorporated community in Washington County, Texas, United States. It is located on Farm to Market Road 1155, approximately 14 miles northeast of Brenham.

== History ==
Goodwill was founded after the 1900s. A Baptist church and school was built there. It is unknown when the school closed down, but as of 2000, the church remains. There is no population estimate for Goodwill, nor is Goodwill on the Highway maps.

== Education ==
Any students in the area are in the Brenham Independent School District.
