= Farm to Market Road 50 =

State road in Texas

Farm to Market Road 50
- FM 50 highlighted in red

Route information
- Maintained by TxDOT
- Length: 51.378 mi (82.685 km)
- Existed: 1942–present

Major junctions
- South end: SH 105 near Brenham
- SH 21
- North end: US 79 / US 190 near Hearne

Location
- Country: United States
- State: Texas
- Counties: Washington, Burleson, Brazos, Robertson

Highway system
- Highways in Texas; Interstate; US; State; Former; Toll; Loops; Spurs; FM/RM; Park; Rec
← FM 49	→ FM 51

Farm to Market Road 50 (FM 50) is a Farm to Market Road in the U.S. state of Texas maintained by the Texas Department of Transportation (TxDOT). The 52.9-mile (85.1 km) route begins at State Highway 105 near Brenham and passes to the north through Independence to U.S. Route 79 and U.S. Route 190 near Hearne. The road has a brief concurrency with SH 21 along a bridge crossing the Brazos River. The road is in Washington, Burleson, Brazos, and Robertson counties.

The road was originally designated in 1942 along the portion of the present route north of SH 21. The road was briefly extended through Snook to SH 36 at Lyons before being rerouted over its current route through Independence to SH 105.

== History ==
The portion of FM 50 south of Independence was originally designated SH 211 on August 1, 1934. SH 211 was extended north to Clay on January 26, 1935, but on July 15, 1935, this extension was cancelled. On January 6, 1939, SH 211 was decommissioned. SH 211 was reinstated on January 22, 1940.

FM 50 was first designated on April 29, 1942, between US 79 and SH 21 and then extended on May 20, 1942, to the intersection of the present FM 60 known before then as SH 230 and then continued to the southwest along the current FM 60 through Snook and Center Line to SH 36 at Lyons. SH 230 was then decommissioned being replaced by an extended FM 50 to Lyons and the newly designated FM 60 to College Station.

On August 24, 1943, another section of FM 50 from FM 60 east of Snook to SH 211 in Independence was added. On October 6, 1943, the stretch of road from east of Snook to Lyons was added as an extension of FM 60, and FM 50 was extended south from Independence incorporating most of SH 211 to the former SH 90, now SH 105, near Brenham. The remainder of SH 211 was redesignated as Spur 197, now FM 390 and FM Spur 390.

== Route description ==
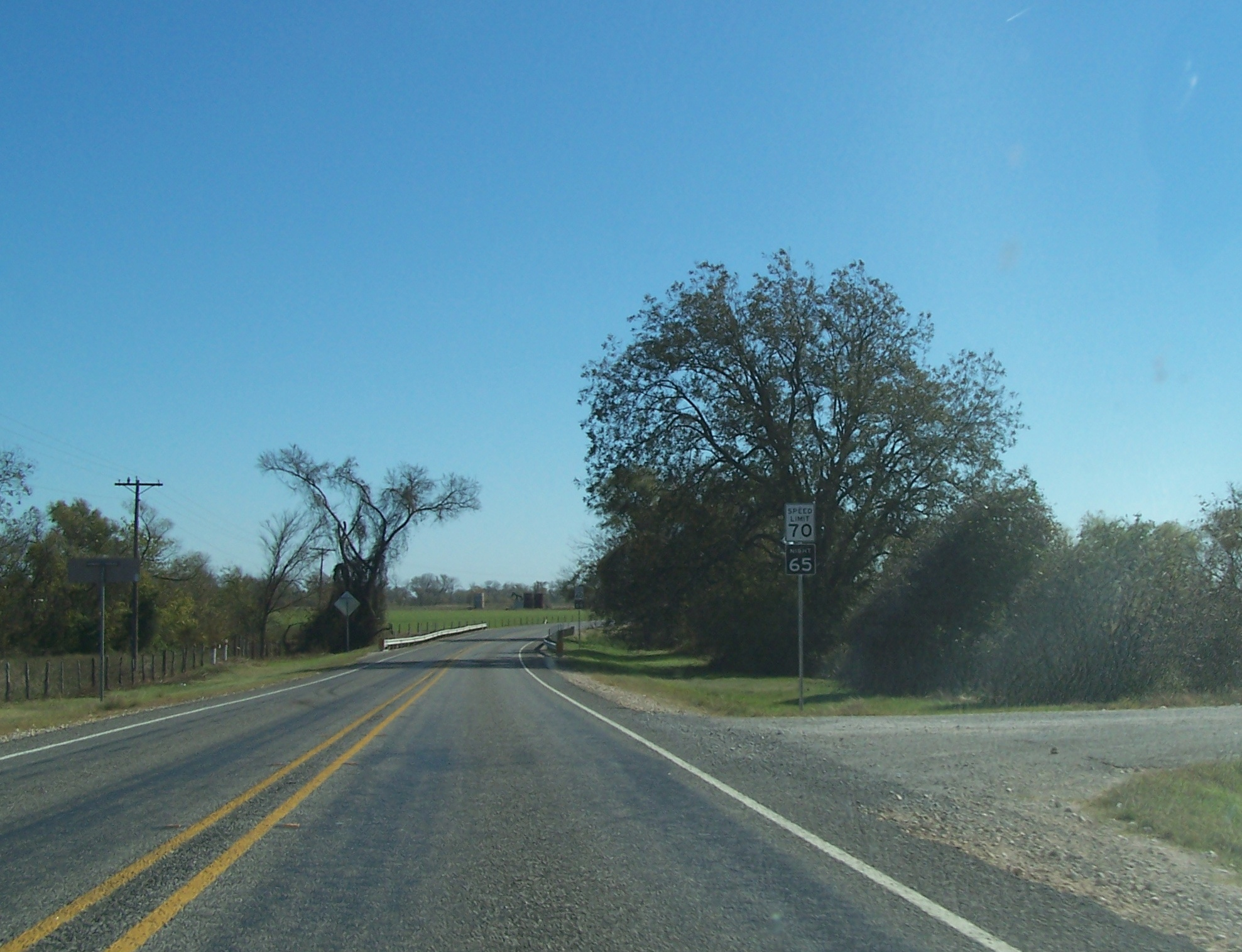
Farm to Market Road 50 immediately south of Texas State Highway 21

FM 50 begins at SH 105 3.0 miles (4.8 km) northeast of Brenham in Washington County. The road proceeds to the north passing Brenham Municipal Airport and intersecting FM 2621 near Prairie Hill before crossing FM 390 at Independence. The road continues northward passing through Jerry's Quarters and crossing Yegua Creek where the road enters Burleson County. North of the creek, the road crosses the Burlington Northern and Santa Fe Railway at Clay.

Further north, FM 50 intersects FM 1361 at Wilcox. After crossing Old River, the road changes course to the northwest crossing FM 60 north of Snook and FM 166 near Foster Store. Further northwest, the road passes through Grant before merging with SH 21. The combined route to the northeast crosses the Brazos River entering Brazos County with FM 50 separating from SH 21 on the other side. The route then goes to the north largely following the Union Pacific Railroad through Law, Sims, an intersection with FM 1687 at Mudville, and Mooring.

North of Mooring, FM 50 crosses into Robertson County and crosses merging Union Pacific tracks at Mumford. The road then follows along the railroad to the northwest crossing the tracks immediately before the road terminates at the combined route of US 79 and US 190 southeast of Hearne.

== Major intersections ==
County	Location	mi	km	Destinations	Notes
Washington		0	0.0	SH 105 – Brenham, Navasota	Southern terminus
Washington		3.6	5.8	FM 2621 – Sandy Hill	
Washington	Independence	8.6	13.8	FM 390 – Gay Hill, William Penn	
Burleson	Wilcox	18.2	29.3	FM 1361 – Somerville	
Burleson		26.6	42.8	FM 60 – Snook, College Station	
Burleson		27.4	44.1	FM 166 – Caldwell	
Burleson		34.8	56.0	SH 21 west – Caldwell	West end of SH 21 overlap
Brazos		36.2	58.3	SH 21 east – Bryan	East end of SH 21 overlap
Brazos	Mudville	39.4	63.4	FM 1687 (Sandy Point Rd.)	
Robertson		52.9	85.1	US 79 / US 190 – Rockdale, Hearne, Cameron	Northern terminus
1.000 mi = 1.609 km; 1.000 km = 0.621 mi
