= Phillipsburg, Texas =

- Unincorporated community
- Location within the state of Texas Phillipsburg, Texas (the United States)
- Coordinates: 30°05′42″N 96°22′01″W
- Country: United States
- State: Texas
- County: Washington, Austin
- Elevation: 387 ft (118 m)
- Time zone: UTC-6 (Central (CST))
  - Summer (DST): UTC-5 (CDT)
- ZIP code: 77833
- Area code: 979
- GNIS feature ID: 1343953

Phillipsburg is an unincorporated community in southern Washington County, in the U.S. state of Texas. The very small rural community is located along State Highway 36 (SH 36) south of Brenham. Aside from the names of two local roads, the name Phillipsburg is no longer marked on modern maps. The cemetery and Lutheran church, which is still open for worship, are actually slightly to the south in neighboring Austin County.

== Geography ==
Phillipsburg is situated on SH 36 at Old Phillipsburg Road, 6.1 miles (9.8 km) from downtown Brenham. Another source stated that the community is 5 miles (8.0 km) south of Brenham. At this point, the BNSF Railway runs roughly parallel with SH 36 and on the west side of the highway. Local roads include Bilski Lane which intersects with SH 36, a short distance north of Old Phillipsburg Road and goes a short way to the east-northeast. New Wehdem Road meets SH 36 just south of Old Phillipsburg Road and heads generally to the southwest. Phillipsburg Church Road, which approximates the Austin-Washington county line, starts at SH 36 0.7 miles (1.1 km) south of Old Phillipsburg Road. Phillipsburg Church Road goes 1.2 miles (1.9 km) to the east-northeast before turning sharply to the south-southeast at Wonder Hill Road near St. Paul Lutheran Church of Phillipsburg. There is a state historical marker at the church, which is in Austin County. Phillipsburg Church Road goes 0.7 miles (1.1 km) south-southeast to Phillipsburg Cemetery, also in Austin County. Continuing in a southerly direction, the road intersects with SH 36 near Kenney.

== History ==
Phillipsburg attracted mostly residents of German ethnicity. In 1889, a post office opened in the settlement, which was located along the Gulf, Colorado and Santa Fe Railway. The following year, the community acquired a station along the railroad. A competing settlement named Pesch was located nearby, but by 1891 Phillipsburg was the more important of the two. Phillipsburg became a significant supply point by 1896. St. Paul Church was built in 1901 and was welcomed into the Texas Lutheran synod twenty years later. In 1904, the post office closed. In 1936, there were about 100 persons and one business establishment in the town. The population decreased to 40 in 1952 and no businesses remained in Phillipsburg by 1970. In 2000, there were 40 persons reported as living in the area.

== Education ==
Today, Phillipsburg is served by the Brenham Independent School District.

== Gallery ==
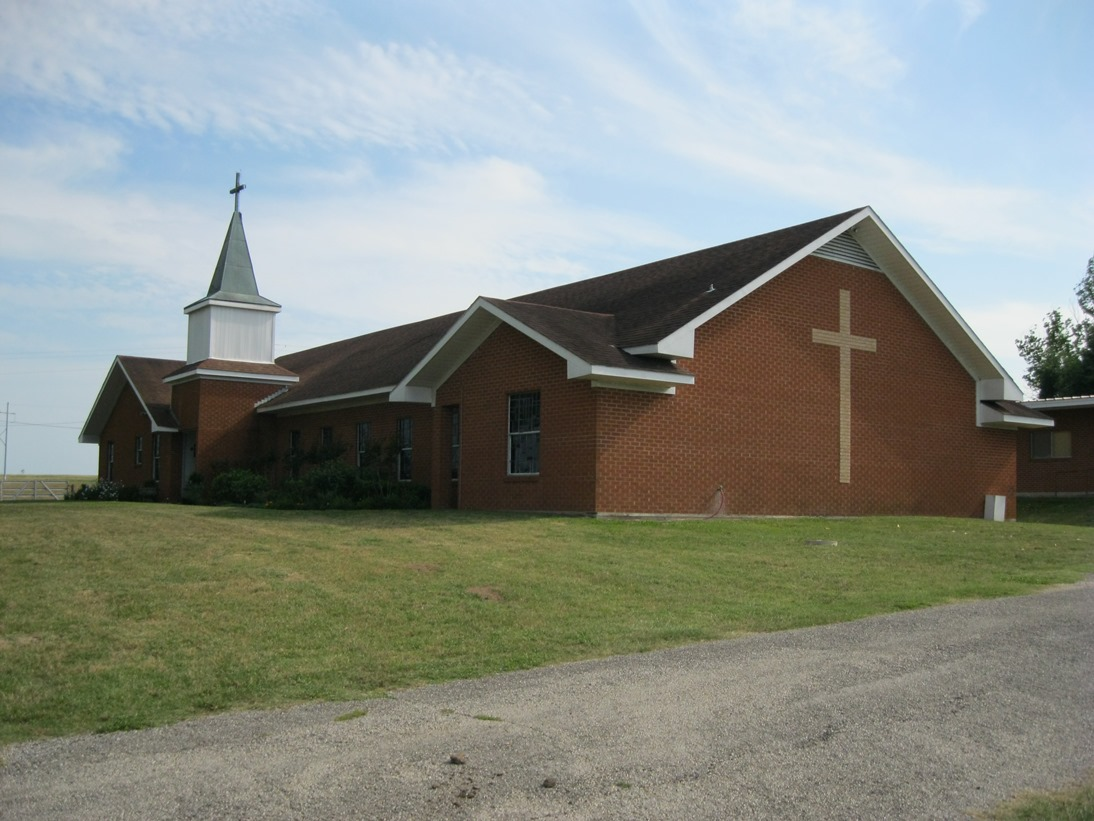
St Paul Lutheran Church on Phillipsburg Church Road

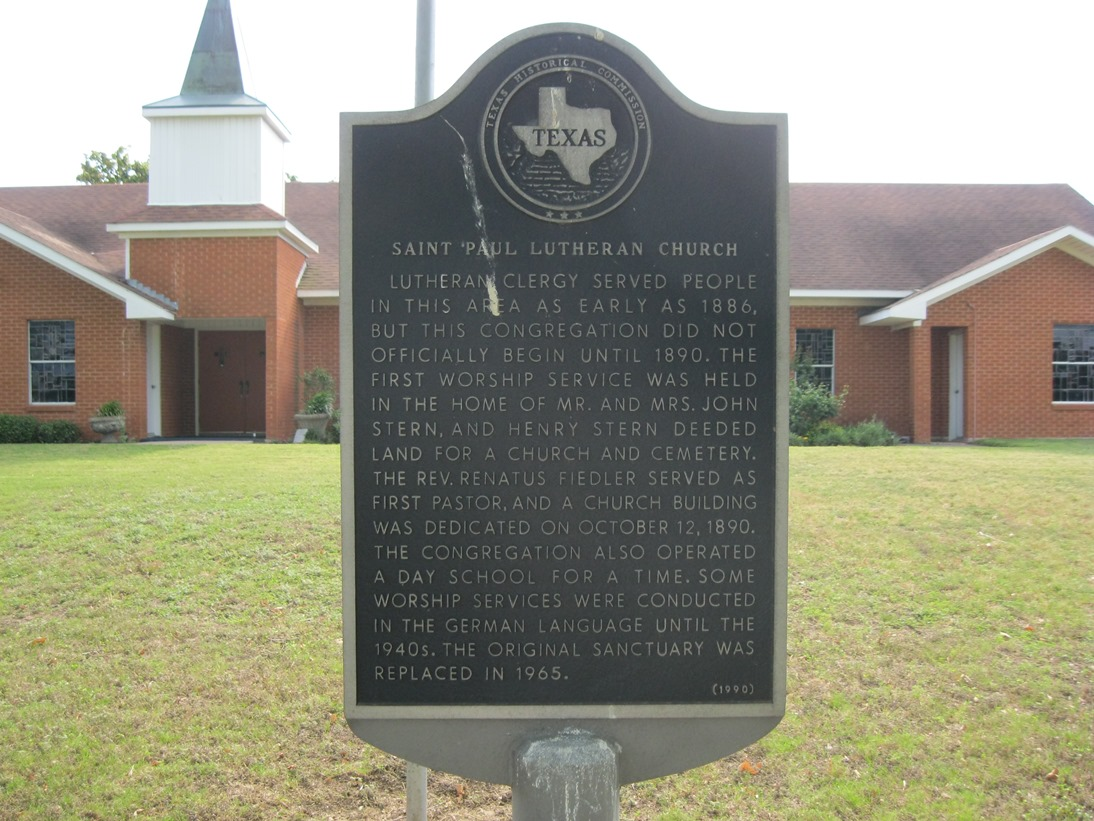
Historical marker at St Paul Lutheran Church in Phillipsburg

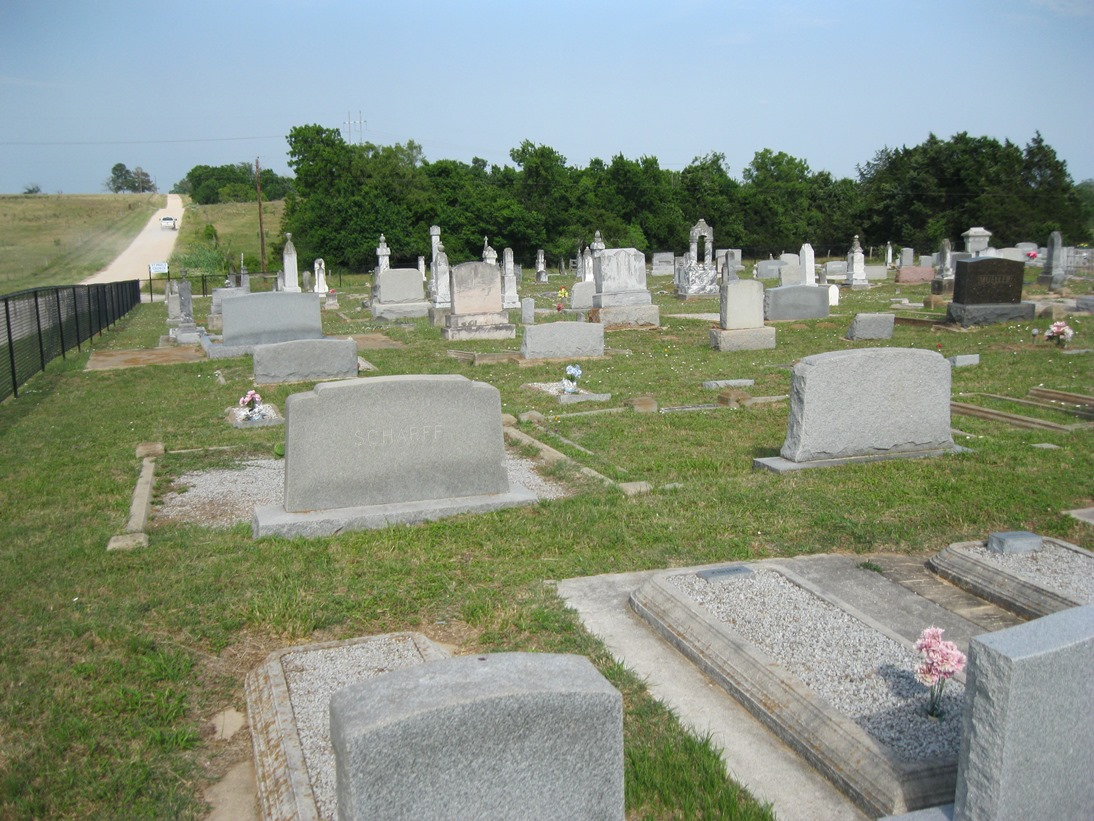
Phillipsburg Cemetery on Sempronius Road, seen at left

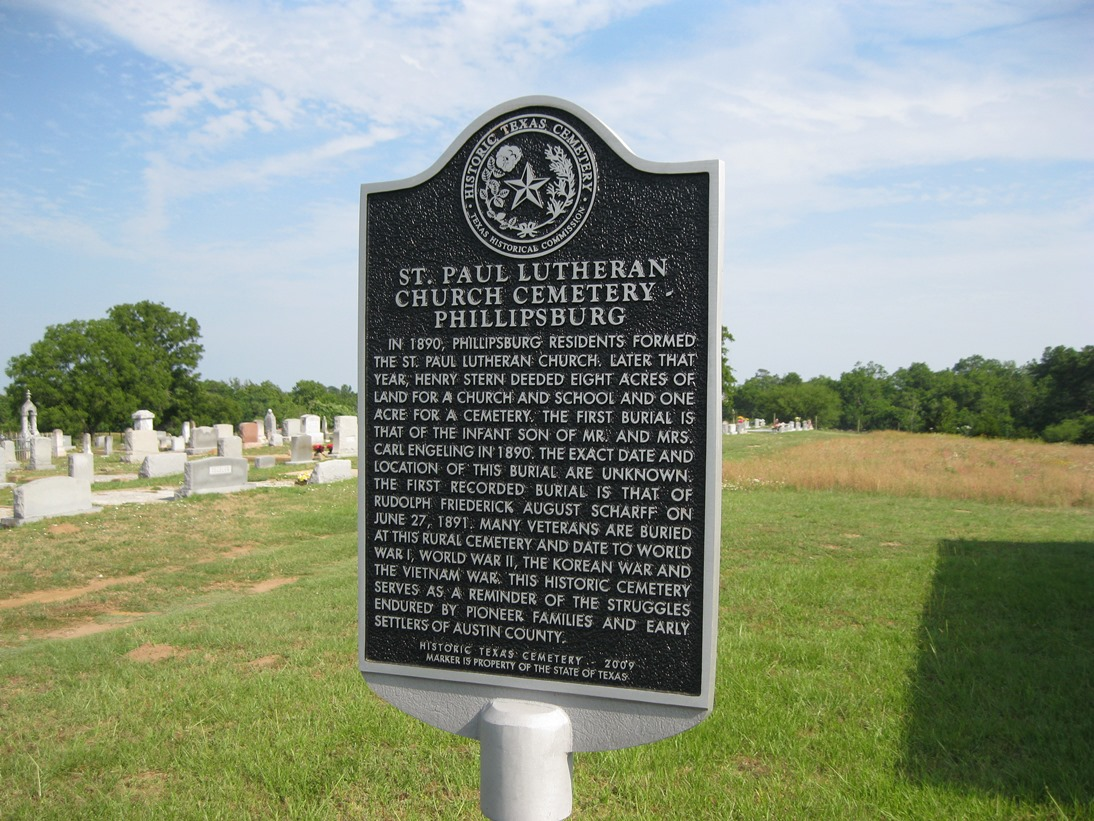
Historical marker at Phillipsburg Cemetery
