= Sandy Hill, Texas =

- Unincorporated community
- Location within Texas Location within the United States
- Coordinates: 30°16′41″N 96°19′33″W
- Country: United States
- State: Texas
- County: Washington
- Elevation: 335 ft (102 m)
- Time zone: UTC-6 (Central (CST))
  - Summer (DST): UTC-5 (CDT)
- Area code: 979
- GNIS feature ID: 1379025

Sandy Hill is an unincorporated community in Washington County, Texas, United States. According to the Handbook of Texas, the community had a population of 50 in 2000. It is located within the Greater Houston metropolitan area.

== History ==
Near Little Rocky Creek on Hardeman Branch is a hill with a 343 ft (105 m) elevation. German immigrants established the settlement, which grew in the early part of the 20th century. The current church structure for St. Matthew's Lutheran Church was built in 1915 after the congregation was established in 1907. It joined the Texas Synod in 1912. Sandy Hill's population increased from a low of ten during the Great Depression to an estimated fifty by 1945 and maintained that figure through 2000. Ranching is the primary economic activity in the area.

== Geography ==
Sandy Hill is located on Farm to Market Road 2621 on Sandy Hill Road near its intersection with Farm to Market Road 50, 9 mi (14 km) west of the Brazos River and 8 mi (13 km) northeast of Brenham in northeastern Washington County.

== Education ==
Today, the community is served by the Brenham Independent School District.
