= Rock Island, Texas =

Rock Island, Texas may refer to the following places:

- Rock Island, Colorado County, Texas
- Rock Island, Polk County, Texas
- Rock Island, Washington County, Texas
