= Brazos Belle Restaurant =

Restaurant in Burton, Texas, U.S.

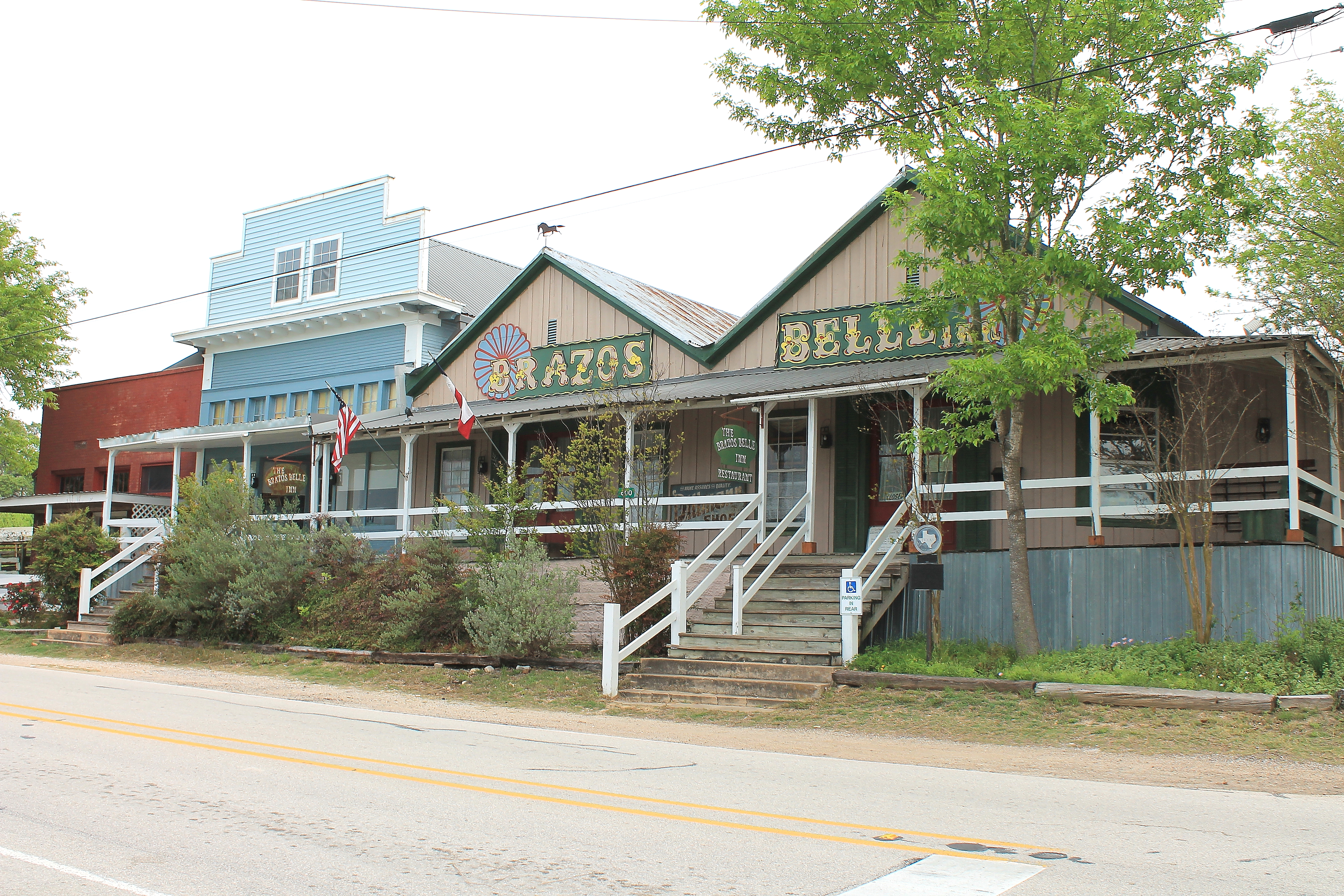
- Brazos Belle in 2013
- Interactive map of Brazos Belle Restaurant

Restaurant information
- Established: 1993
- Food type: French
- Location: 600 N Main Street, Burton, Texas, 77835, United States
- Coordinates: 30.1825°N 96.5962°W
- Website: www.brazosbellerestaurant.com

Brazos Belle Restaurant was a French country restaurant located in the town of Burton, Texas, in the rolling hills of Washington County.

== History ==
Established in 1993 by chefs André Delacroix and Sandy Chariau, Brazos Belle was housed in the historic Steiner & Dallmeyer Building dating back to the late 19th century. The restaurant has been celebrated locally for its authentic French bistro-style dishes and charming ambiance. The Brazos Belle gained a loyal following for its homemade bread, seasonal menu, and intimate setting. As of 2025, following the death of its chef, it remains temporarily closed for extensive renovations, with plans to reopen after restoring the adjacent historic Bridge Building.

== See also ==
- Texas Hill Country
