= Whitman, Texas =

- Unincorporated community
- Location within Texas Location within the United States
- Coordinates: 30°14′27″N 96°14′32″W
- Country: United States
- State: Texas
- County: Washington
- Elevation: 282 ft (86 m)
- Time zone: UTC-6 (Central (CST))
  - Summer (DST): UTC-5 (CDT)
- Area code: 979
- GNIS feature ID: 2034814

Whitman is an unincorporated community in Washington County, Texas, United States. According to the Handbook of Texas, the community had a population of 25 in 2000. It is located within the Greater Houston metropolitan area.

== History ==
The settlement opened a post office in 1876 and was named after Walter G. Whitman, its first postmaster. It had a commercial sector based around the local cotton industry as well as 75 residents by the mid-1880s. The populatation was reported at 25 between 1945 and 2000.

== Geography ==
Whitman is located on Farm to Market Road 1155 near Jackson Creek and Farm to Market Road 2193, 14 mi (23 km) northeast of Brenham in eastern Washington County.

== Education ==
Today, the community is served by the Brenham Independent School District.
