= Dee Winters =

American football player (born 2000)

No. 53 – Dallas Cowboys
- Position: Linebacker
- Roster status: Active

Personal information
- Born: October 17, 2000 (age 26); Brenham, Texas, U.S.
- Listed height: 5 ft 11 in (1.80 m)
- Listed weight: 227 lb (103 kg)

Career information
- High school: Burton (TX)
- College: TCU (2019–2022)
- NFL draft: 2023: 6th round, 216th overall pick

Career history
- San Francisco 49ers (2023–2025); Dallas Cowboys (2026–present)

Awards and highlights
- First-team All-Big 12 (2022)

Career NFL statistics as of Week 5, 2026
- Total tackles: 190
- Pass deflections: 11
- Interceptions: 2
- Defensive touchdowns: 1
- Fumble recoveries: 1
- Stats at Pro Football Reference

De'Monderick Winters (born October 17, 2000) is an American professional football linebacker for the Dallas Cowboys of the National Football League (NFL). He played college football for the TCU Horned Frogs.

== Early life ==
Winters was born on October 17, 2000, and grew up in Burton, Texas, a small town west of Houston that had only one gas station. He played football at Burton High School and was a two-way player, although he was primarily used at wide receiver. A three-star recruit, Winters ranked as the 87th-best player in the state and committed to TCU over Arkansas, Northwestern, Arizona State and Texas Tech.

== College career ==
Although recruited as a safety, Winters' position was quickly changed to linebacker when he arrived at TCU. As a true freshman, he appeared in 11 games, two of which he started, and posted 28 tackles and a sack.

Winters won the starting job as a sophomore and started all 10 games, placing second on the team with 65 tackles, 9.5 of which were for a loss.

Winters remained a starter as a junior, starting all 12 games and leading TCU with 74 tackles while being third on the team with five tackles for loss.

As a senior in 2022, Winters led a defense that brought TCU to the national championship game, earning first-team All-Big 12 Conference honors after tallying 79 tackles, the fourth-best on the squad, a team-leading 14.5 tackles-for-lossp (tied with Dylan Horton), and 7.5 sacks, placing second on the team. He was named most valuable player of their playoff semifinals win over Michigan after recording seven tackles, three of which were for a loss, a pass breakup and a 29-yard interception return touchdown. After the season, Winters was invited to the Senior Bowl. At the time of his graduation, Winters was the career leader in stops among active TCU players.

=== College statistics ===
Season	Team	GP	Tackles				Interceptions				Fumbles		
Season	Team	GP	Cmb	Solo	Ast	Sck	Int	Yds	Avg	TD	FF	FR	TD
2019	TCU	11	28	19	9	2.0	0	0	0	0	0	0	0
2020	TCU	10	65	40	25	2.0	0	0	0	0	0	1	1
2021	TCU	12	74	53	21	1.0	2	7	3.5	0	0	0	0
2022	TCU	15	79	48	31	7.5	1	29	29.0	1	0	1	0
Career		48	246	160	86	12.5	3	36	12.0	1	0	2	1

== Professional career ==
Pre-draft measurables
Height	Weight	Arm length	Hand span	Wingspan	40-yard dash	10-yard split	20-yard split	20-yard shuttle	Vertical jump	Broad jump	Bench press
5 ft 11 in (1.80 m)	227 lb (103 kg)	31 5/8 in (0.80 m)	8 5/8 in (0.22 m)	6 ft 3 in (1.91 m)	4.49 s	1.56 s	2.59 s	4.46 s	31.5 in (0.80 m)	9 ft 9 in (2.97 m)	20 reps
All values from NFL Combine/Pro Day

=== San Francisco 49ers ===
Winters was selected by the San Francisco 49ers in the sixth round (216th overall) of the 2023 NFL draft. He appeared in 15 games for the 49ers as a rookie, defending one pass and logging 10 combined tackles.

Winters again appeared in 15 games (including 10 starts) for the 49ers in 2024, posting four passes defended and 44 combined tackles. Winters started all 17 games for the 49ers in 2025, recording one interception, five passes defended, and 101 combined tackles. During Week 16 against the Indianapolis Colts, Winters intercepted Philip Rivers and returned the ball 74 yards for his first NFL touchdown.

=== Dallas Cowboys ===
On April 24, 2026, Winters was traded to the Dallas Cowboys in exchange for a fifth-round pick.

== NFL career statistics ==
Legend
**Bold**	Career high

=== Regular season ===
Year	Team	Games		Tackles					Interceptions						Fumbles				
Year	Team	GP	GS	Cmb	Solo	Ast	Sck	TFL	Int	Yds	Avg	Lng	TD	PD	FF	Fum	FR	Yds	TD
2023	SF	15	0	10	6	4	0.0	0	0	0	0.0	0	0	1	0	0	0	0	0
2024	SF	15	10	44	26	18	0.0	0	0	0	0.0	0	0	4	0	0	0	0	0
2025	SF	**17**	**17**	**101**	**67**	**34**	0.0	**8**	**1**	**74**	**74.0**	**74**	**1**	**5**	0	0	0	0	0
2026	DAL	6	6	35	23	12	0.0	3	1	0	0.0	0	0	1	0	0	1	5	0
Career		53	33	190	122	68	0.0	11	2	74	74.0	74	1	11	0	0	1	5	0

=== Postseason ===
Year	Team	Games		Tackles					Interceptions						Fumbles				
Year	Team	GP	GS	Cmb	Solo	Ast	Sck	TFL	Int	Yds	Avg	Lng	TD	PD	FF	Fum	FR	Yds	TD
2023	SF	**3**	0	1	1	0	0.0	0	0	0	0	0	0	0	0	0	0	0	0
2025	SF	1	**1**	**9**	**5**	**4**	0.0	**3**	0	0	0	0	0	0	0	0	0	0	0
Career		4	1	10	6	4	0.0	3	0	0	0	0	0	0	0	0	0	0	0
