= Tigertown, Texas =

Tigertown
- Ghost town
- Location within Texas Location within the United States
- Coordinates: 30°05′54.6″N 96°27′18.6″W
- Country: United States
- State: Texas
- County: Washington
- Settled: 1830
- Abandoned: 1900

Tigertown, also known as Tiger Point, is a ghost town in Washington County, Texas, United States. It was located on FM 332 Rd before the road descends into the Mill Creek bottoms, approximately six miles from Brenham.

== History ==
Tigertown was founded before the Texas Revolution. In the 1830s, Phil Coe Sr named the town Tigertown because "he said it was full of men who led fast and furious lives." It had a post office by the 1850s, but nothing remained of the town by 1900. Today, a farm stands on where Tigertown existed.
