= Berlin, Texas =

Unincorporated community in Texas, US

Coordinates: 30°10′17″N 96°26′45″W

Berlin is an unincorporated community in Washington County, in the U.S. state of Texas. The community is on U.S. Route 290, approximately two miles west of Brenham.

== History ==
Berlin was founded in 1864. The community was originally built up chiefly by Germans.
