= Texas Regulars =

American political faction formed for the 1944 presidential election

The Texas Regulars was a group based in Texas which was formed in 1944 to deny Franklin D. Roosevelt a majority of the Electoral College in the 1944 presidential election.

== Background ==
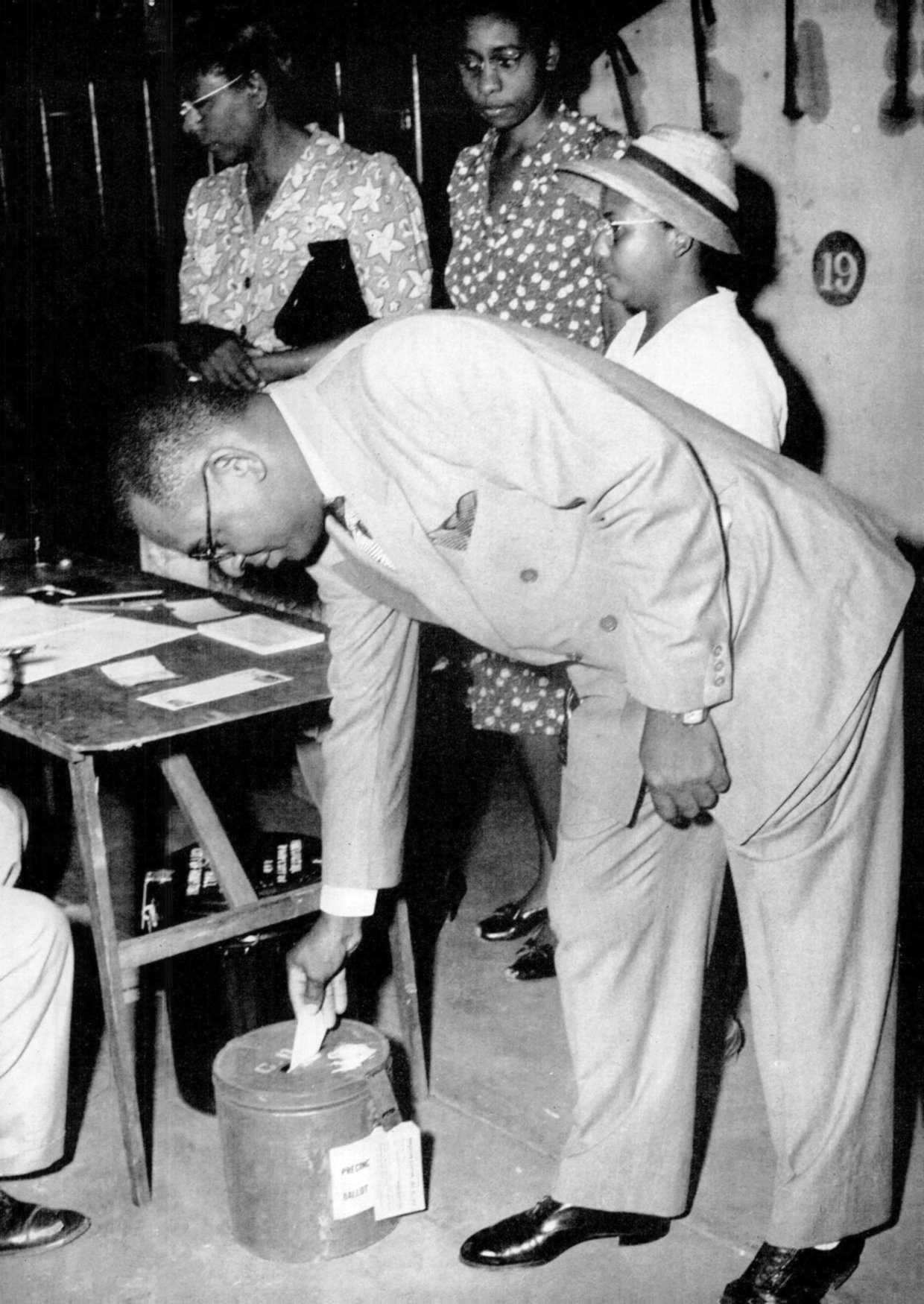
Houston dentist Lonnie E. Smith casts his ballot in the 1944 Texas Democratic primary election (July 22, 1944).

By the 1940s, conservative Democrats in Texas had become increasingly disenchanted with Roosevelt and his New Deal.

They were also unhappy that the US Supreme Court, in Smith v. Allwright (1944), had disallowed the segregated primaries (White primaries) used by the Democratic Party in Texas and some other states.

== History ==
=== Attempt at taking over the Texas Democratic Party ===
The Texas Regulars tried to gain control of the state nominating convention and select a slate of presidential electors who would not vote for Roosevelt. The group's supporters included US Representative Martin Dies Jr., former Texas governor Dan Moody, and Senator W. Lee O'Daniel.

The Texas Regulars won the first convention, but lost the second convention.

=== Unpledged electors ===
This defeat led them to form their own ticket of unpledged electors, not bound to any candidate. On election day, they finished third both in Texas and in the national popular vote, with 135,439 votes (0.3% of the vote nationally, and 11.8% of the vote in Texas). They won a majority in only Washington County, Texas.

Roosevelt easily carried Texas with 71.4% of the statewide vote, and won national re-election with 432 of 531 electoral votes.

=== Platform ===
The Texas Regulars opposed the New Deal, trade unions, and government intervention and supported states' rights and white supremacy, with a platform paraphrased as follows:

1. Restoration of the Democratic Party to the integrity which has been taken away by Hillman, Browder, and others.
2. Protection of honest labor unions from foreign-born racketeers who have gained control by blackmail.
3. Return of state rights which have been destroyed by the Communist-controlled New Deal.
4. Restoration of the freedom of education.
5. Restoration of the supremacy of the white race, which has been destroyed by the Communist-controlled New Deal.
6. Restoration of the Bill of Rights instead of rule by regimentation.
7. Restoration of government by laws instead of government by bureaus.
8. Restoration of the individual appeal for justice, instead of a politically appointed bureau.

== Aftermath ==
The Texas Regulars disbanded soon afterward, but many of them went on to support the Dixiecrat movement of Strom Thurmond in the 1948 presidential election.

They later became "Eisenhower Democrats" (or supported unpledged electors in presidential elections) in the 1950s, before becoming Republicans by the 1960s and 1970s.

== See also ==
- George Wallace 1968 presidential campaign

=== Links ===
- Conservative Democrat
- Unpledged elector

=== Sources ===
- McArthur, Judith N.; Harold L., Smith (2005). "At War With The Texas Regulars, 1944–1946". Minnie Fisher Cunningham.
