= Ayres, Texas =

Ghost town in Texas, US

Ayres, or Ayers, is a ghost town in Washington County, Texas, United States. Established c. 1835 by Stephen F. Austin, it was named for settler David Ayres. It was later abandoned.
