= 1944 United States presidential election in Texas =

- November 7, 1944

Nominee	Franklin D. Roosevelt	Thomas E. Dewey	Unpledged electors
Party	Democratic	Republican	Texas Regulars
Home state	New York	New York	Texas
Running mate	Harry S. Truman	John W. Bricker	—
Electoral vote	23	0	0
Popular vote	821,605	191,425	135,439
Percentage	71.42%	16.64%	11.77%
County results
Roosevelt
40–50%
50–60%
60–70%
70–80%
80–90%
90–100%
Dewey
40–50%
50–60%
60–70%
70–80%
80–90%
Unpledged
50–60%
President before election
Franklin D. Roosevelt
Democratic
Elected President
Franklin D. Roosevelt
Democratic

The 1944 United States presidential election in Texas took place on November 7, 1944, as part of the 1944 United States presidential election. State voters chose 23 electors to represent the state in the Electoral College, which chose the president and vice president.

Incumbent Democratic President Franklin D. Roosevelt won Texas in a landslide, taking 71.42% of the state's vote to Republican Thomas E. Dewey's 16.64%. The Texas Regulars, a group of conservative Democrats who opposed Roosevelt's New Deal and ran a ticket of unpledged electors, took 11.77% of the vote.

As a former Confederate state, Texas had a history of Jim Crow laws, disenfranchisement of African-American and Mexican-American populations, and single-party Democratic rule. The only exceptions to this were a few local governments in Unionist German-American counties (chiefly Gillespie and Kendall) in Central Texas. Since 1930, no Republicans had served in either house of the Texas Legislature, and Democratic candidates for federal office routinely won the state by an overwhelming margin (Franklin Roosevelt won more than 87% of Texas' ballots in both 1932 and 1936). Many of Texas' officeholders were highly critical of Roosevelt's decision in 1940 to replace the segregationist, pro-Jim Crow, conservative Texan John Nance Garner with the anti-segregationist, anti-Jim Crow, liberal Northerner Henry A. Wallace as his running mate.

This antipathy grew far worse when, in March 1944, the landmark case of Smith v. Allwright ruled unconstitutional the white primaries upon which the politics of Texas and most other Southern states were based. (Note: Oklahoma, Tennessee, North Carolina and Virginia lacked statewide white primaries due to the presence of viable Republican opposition in the northwestern Plains or Appalachia, although many counties in these states did use white primaries (Fayette County, Tennessee was to conduct white primaries as late as 1959, fifteen years after Smith v. Allwright).) The result was that Texas' oil and natural gas industries became powerfully opposed to the re-nomination of President Roosevelt, and called for the reversal of New Deal policies alongside the "return of states' rights" and "restoration of white supremacy".

At first, these anti-New Deal Democrats attempted to take over the state Democratic organization, send anti-Roosevelt delegates to the national convention, and prevent the seating of Black delegates at that convention. When this failed, and Roosevelt loyalists maintained control of the state Democratic delegation, the anti-New Deal groups formed the "Texas Regulars", led by Merritt Gibson, who would later join Strom Thurmond's Dixiecrat movement.

Although their electors were not pledged to any candidate, the Regulars were able to gain access to the ballot in September. Support from Governor Pappy O'Daniel, however, failed to obscure that the Regulars' support was largely confined to affluent urban areas and a few traditional plantation districts, plus the fact that some of their support came from the state's small traditional Republican presidential vote. Consequently, Texas again voted overwhelming for incumbent President Roosevelt and his new running mate, Missouri Senator Harry S. Truman.

Washington County nonetheless gave the Regulars 52 percent of its ballots and thus became the first county in the nation to go for a third party since 1924, when Robert La Follette won over 16% of the national vote and more than a sixth of the nation's counties, Roosevelt remains the most recent Democratic presidential candidate to carry Texas more than once.

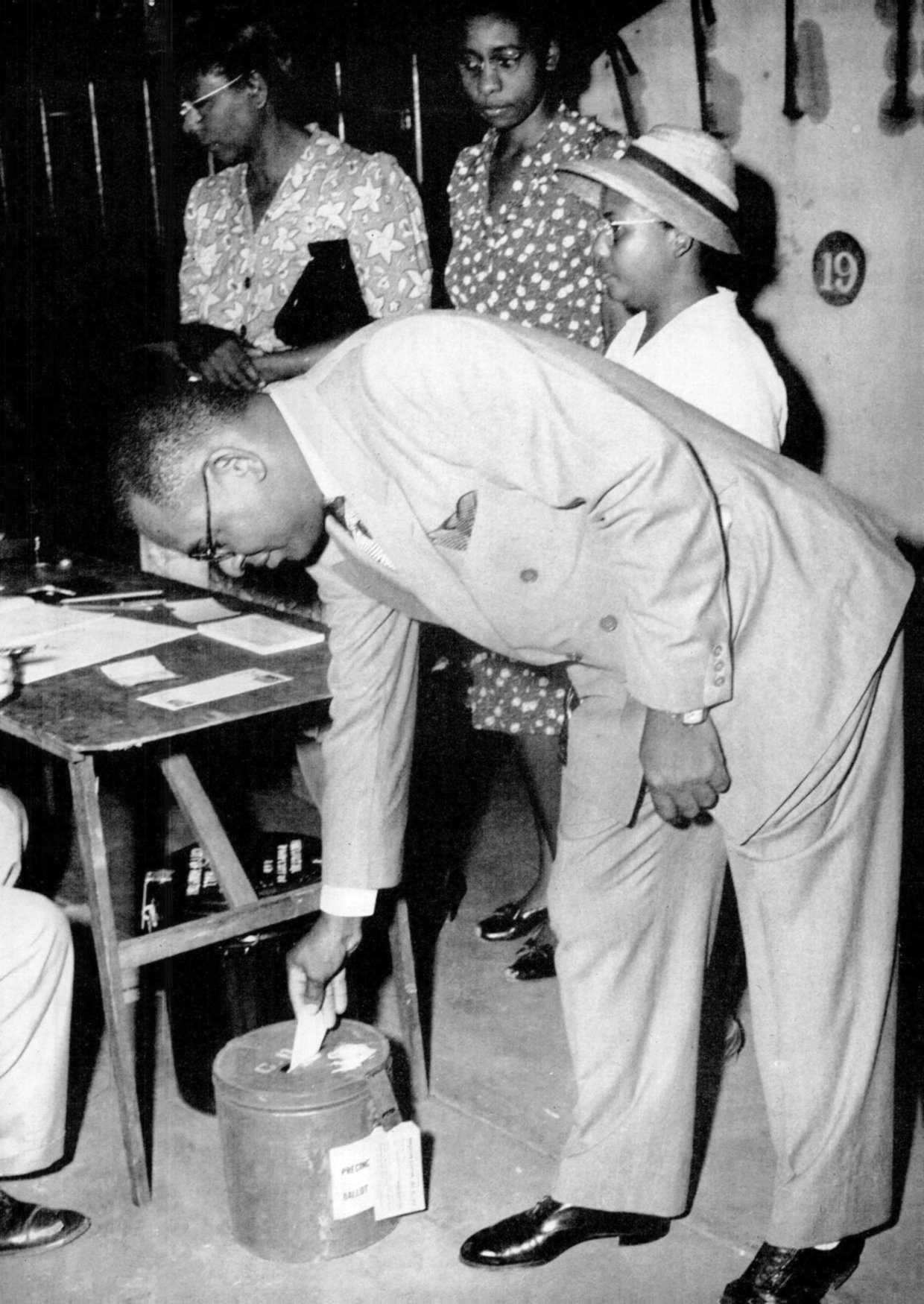
Houston dentist Lonnie E. Smith, plaintiff in the landmark Supreme Court case Smith v. Allwright, casts his ballot in the 1944 Texas Democratic primary (July 22, 1944).

== Results ==
1944 United States presidential election in Texas
Party	Candidate	Votes	%
Democratic	Franklin D. Roosevelt (inc.)	821,605	71.42%
Republican	Thomas E. Dewey	191,425	16.64%
Texas Regulars	Unpledged electors	135,439	11.77%
Prohibition	Claude Watson	1,017	0.09%
Socialist	Norman Thomas	594	0.05%
America First	Gerald Smith	251	0.02%
Total votes		1,150,331	100%

=== Results by county ===
1944 United States presidential election in Texas by county
County	Franklin D. Roosevelt Democratic		Thomas E. Dewey Republican		Unpledged electors Texas Regulars		Various candidates Other parties		Margin		Total votes cast
County	#	%	#	%	#	%	#	%	#	%	Total votes cast
Anderson	4,342	79.32%	467	8.53%	660	12.06%	5	0.09%	3,682 (Note: In this county where the unpledged "Texas Regulars" ran second ahead of Dewey, margin given is Roosevelt vote minus Texas Regulars vote and percentage margin Roosevelt percentage minus Texas Regulars percentage.)	67.26%	5,474
Andrews	329	81.44%	48	11.88%	21	5.20%	6	1.49%	281	69.55%	404
Angelina	4,387	74.38%	1,001	16.97%	508	8.61%	2	0.03%	3,386	57.41%	5,898
Aransas	456	73.43%	150	24.15%	12	1.93%	3	0.48%	306	49.28%	621
Archer	1,674	79.83%	194	9.25%	227	10.82%	2	0.10%	1,447	69.00%	2,097
Armstrong	623	77.88%	132	16.50%	44	5.50%	1	0.13%	491	61.38%	800
Atascosa	1,757	66.40%	685	25.89%	202	7.63%	2	0.08%	1,072	40.51%	2,646
Austin	1,316	41.33%	619	19.44%	1,248	39.20%	1	0.03%	68	2.14%	3,184
Bailey	943	64.68%	358	24.55%	153	10.49%	4	0.27%	585	40.12%	1,458
Bandera	532	42.29%	634	50.40%	92	7.31%	0	0.00%	-102	-8.11%	1,258
Bastrop	2,604	79.17%	385	11.71%	299	9.09%	1	0.03%	2,219	67.47%	3,289
Baylor	1,568	87.65%	102	5.70%	118	6.60%	1	0.06%	1,450	81.05%	1,789
Bee	1,306	54.17%	848	35.17%	246	10.20%	11	0.46%	458	19.00%	2,411
Bell	6,960	77.72%	763	8.52%	1,216	13.58%	16	0.18%	5,744	64.14%	8,955
Bexar	35,024	57.96%	23,588	39.04%	1,697	2.81%	118	0.20%	11,436	18.93%	60,427
Blanco	846	55.95%	533	35.25%	133	8.80%	0	0.00%	313	20.70%	1,512
Borden	237	76.95%	34	11.04%	36	11.69%	1	0.32%	201	65.26%	308
Bosque	2,502	75.02%	504	15.11%	324	9.72%	5	0.15%	1,998	59.91%	3,335
Bowie	7,045	79.14%	790	8.87%	1,063	11.94%	4	0.04%	5,982	67.20%	8,902
Brazoria	5,543	72.07%	850	11.05%	1,286	16.72%	12	0.16%	4,257	55.35%	7,691
Brazos	3,358	76.75%	464	10.61%	548	12.53%	5	0.11%	2,810	64.23%	4,375
Brewster	864	72.85%	237	19.98%	83	7.00%	2	0.17%	627	52.87%	1,186
Briscoe	615	74.28%	80	9.66%	131	15.82%	2	0.24%	484	58.45%	828
Brooks	403	63.46%	142	22.36%	86	13.54%	4	0.63%	261	41.10%	635
Brown	2,426	68.45%	430	12.13%	675	19.05%	13	0.37%	1,751	49.41%	3,544
Burleson	1,992	82.76%	158	6.56%	256	10.64%	1	0.04%	1,736	72.12%	2,407
Burnet	1,697	80.35%	228	10.80%	183	8.66%	4	0.19%	1,469	69.55%	2,112
Caldwell	2,916	75.00%	704	18.11%	266	6.84%	2	0.05%	2,212	56.89%	3,888
Calhoun	732	68.22%	158	14.73%	176	16.40%	7	0.65%	556	51.82%	1,073
Callahan	1,962	79.66%	224	9.09%	276	11.21%	1	0.04%	1,686	68.45%	2,463
Cameron	5,998	50.63%	5,309	44.82%	510	4.31%	29	0.24%	689	5.82%	11,846
Camp	977	71.42%	180	13.16%	210	15.35%	1	0.07%	767	56.07%	1,368
Carson	1,216	68.97%	446	25.30%	97	5.50%	4	0.23%	770	43.68%	1,763
Cass	2,866	76.59%	541	14.46%	331	8.85%	4	0.11%	2,325	62.13%	3,742
Castro	838	69.66%	222	18.45%	143	11.89%	0	0.00%	616	51.21%	1,203
Chambers	1,038	78.10%	179	13.47%	110	8.28%	2	0.15%	859	64.64%	1,329
Cherokee	3,918	76.14%	598	11.62%	620	12.05%	10	0.19%	3,298	64.09%	5,146
Childress	2,295	82.05%	299	10.69%	199	7.11%	4	0.14%	1,996	71.36%	2,797
Clay	2,307	77.42%	311	10.44%	358	12.01%	4	0.13%	1,949	65.40%	2,980
Cochran	716	71.60%	123	12.30%	157	15.70%	4	0.40%	559	55.90%	1,000
Coke	824	85.92%	65	6.78%	69	7.19%	1	0.10%	755	78.73%	959
Coleman	2,887	77.94%	498	13.44%	312	8.42%	7	0.19%	2,389	64.50%	3,704
Collin	6,574	78.79%	974	11.67%	784	9.40%	12	0.14%	5,600	67.11%	8,344
Collingsworth	1,725	79.79%	261	12.07%	168	7.77%	8	0.37%	1,464	67.72%	2,162
Colorado	1,517	48.97%	638	20.59%	931	30.05%	12	0.39%	586	18.92%	3,098
Comal	787	26.33%	2,021	67.61%	178	5.96%	3	0.10%	-1,234	-41.28%	2,989
Comanche	2,941	77.66%	356	9.40%	484	12.78%	6	0.16%	2,457	64.88%	3,787
Concho	1,090	79.91%	151	11.07%	123	9.02%	0	0.00%	939	68.84%	1,364
Cooke	3,270	66.22%	919	18.61%	730	14.78%	19	0.38%	2,351	47.61%	4,938
Coryell	2,518	79.71%	413	13.07%	228	7.22%	0	0.00%	2,105	66.64%	3,159
Cottle	2,551	91.89%	130	4.68%	94	3.39%	1	0.04%	2,421	87.21%	2,776
Crane	552	86.38%	58	9.08%	25	3.91%	4	0.63%	494	77.31%	639
Crockett	323	65.65%	112	22.76%	57	11.59%	0	0.00%	211	42.89%	492
Crosby	1,691	79.50%	201	9.45%	230	10.81%	5	0.24%	1,461	68.69%	2,127
Culberson	200	79.68%	17	6.77%	34	13.55%	0	0.00%	166	66.14%	251
Dallam	1,118	69.44%	323	20.06%	167	10.37%	2	0.12%	795	49.38%	1,610
Dallas	60,909	64.77%	21,099	22.44%	11,781	12.53%	247	0.26%	39,810	42.33%	94,036
Dawson	2,149	74.83%	472	16.43%	244	8.50%	7	0.24%	1,677	58.39%	2,872
Deaf Smith	1,117	61.88%	508	28.14%	176	9.75%	4	0.22%	609	33.74%	1,805
Delta	1,706	85.86%	133	6.69%	148	7.45%	0	0.00%	1,558	78.41%	1,987
Denton	5,584	78.54%	771	10.84%	739	10.39%	16	0.23%	4,813	67.69%	7,110
De Witt	1,884	45.00%	1,879	44.88%	419	10.01%	5	0.12%	5	0.12%	4,187
Dickens	1,617	86.06%	141	7.50%	117	6.23%	4	0.21%	1,476	78.55%	1,879
Dimmit	554	56.70%	328	33.57%	95	9.72%	0	0.00%	226	23.13%	977
Donley	1,170	74.90%	280	17.93%	108	6.91%	4	0.26%	890	56.98%	1,562
Duval	3,353	95.31%	136	3.87%	28	0.80%	1	0.03%	3,217	91.44%	3,518
Eastland	4,607	75.87%	643	10.59%	809	13.32%	13	0.21%	3,798	62.55%	6,072
Ector	2,265	73.28%	432	13.98%	384	12.42%	10	0.32%	1,833	59.30%	3,091
Edwards	348	59.39%	187	31.91%	48	8.19%	3	0.51%	161	27.47%	586
Ellis	7,065	85.08%	666	8.02%	564	6.79%	9	0.11%	6,399	77.06%	8,304
El Paso	11,426	72.69%	2,072	13.18%	2,202	14.01%	18	0.11%	9,224	58.68%	15,718
Erath	3,330	79.84%	411	9.85%	415	9.95%	15	0.36%	2,915	69.89%	4,171
Falls	3,191	75.63%	377	8.94%	648	15.36%	3	0.07%	2,543	60.27%	4,219
Fannin	5,984	83.54%	677	9.45%	496	6.92%	6	0.08%	5,307	74.09%	7,163
Fayette	3,156	52.34%	1,611	26.72%	1,251	20.75%	12	0.20%	1,545	25.62%	6,030
Fisher	2,041	87.52%	154	6.60%	135	5.79%	2	0.09%	1,887	80.92%	2,332
Floyd	1,756	71.73%	370	15.11%	320	13.07%	2	0.08%	1,386	56.62%	2,448
Foard	925	85.65%	84	7.78%	69	6.39%	2	0.19%	841	77.87%	1,080
Fort Bend	2,781	69.87%	442	11.11%	752	18.89%	5	0.13%	2,029	50.98%	3,980
Franklin	1,336	83.45%	147	9.18%	110	6.87%	8	0.50%	1,189	74.27%	1,601
Freestone	2,427	80.31%	277	9.17%	312	10.32%	6	0.20%	2,115	69.99%	3,022
Frio	951	69.47%	293	21.40%	124	9.06%	1	0.07%	658	48.06%	1,369
Gaines	1,173	79.74%	173	11.76%	118	8.02%	7	0.48%	1,000	67.98%	1,471
Galveston	11,748	77.94%	1,542	10.23%	1,757	11.66%	27	0.18%	9,991	66.28%	15,074
Garza	842	72.65%	144	12.42%	169	14.58%	4	0.35%	673	58.07%	1,159
Gillespie	333	9.32%	2,950	82.56%	287	8.03%	3	0.08%	-2,617	-73.24%	3,573
Glasscock	185	68.77%	34	12.64%	48	17.84%	2	0.74%	137	50.93%	269
Goliad	641	47.55%	609	45.18%	95	7.05%	3	0.22%	32	2.37%	1,348
Gonzales	2,804	70.33%	841	21.09%	338	8.48%	4	0.10%	1,963	49.24%	3,987
Gray	3,067	61.48%	1,739	34.86%	172	3.45%	11	0.22%	1,328	26.62%	4,989
Grayson	11,636	82.70%	1,372	9.75%	1,044	7.42%	18	0.13%	10,264	72.95%	14,070
Gregg	6,401	70.52%	1,412	15.56%	1,249	13.76%	15	0.17%	4,989	54.96%	9,077
Grimes	1,559	79.14%	137	6.95%	274	13.91%	0	0.00%	1,285	65.23%	1,970
Guadalupe	1,583	36.45%	2,556	58.85%	200	4.61%	4	0.09%	-973	-22.40%	4,343
Hale	3,066	70.02%	712	16.26%	594	13.56%	7	0.16%	2,354	53.76%	4,379
Hall	1,812	85.96%	164	7.78%	126	5.98%	6	0.28%	1,648	78.18%	2,108
Hamilton	1,790	71.63%	344	13.77%	363	14.53%	2	0.08%	1,427	57.10%	2,499
Hansford	590	70.07%	203	24.11%	49	5.82%	0	0.00%	387	45.96%	842
Hardeman	1,756	80.81%	223	10.26%	192	8.84%	2	0.09%	1,533	70.55%	2,173
Hardin	2,632	84.20%	243	7.77%	234	7.49%	17	0.54%	2,389	76.42%	3,126
Harris	71,077	68.27%	11,843	11.37%	21,095	20.26%	104	0.10%	49,982	48.00%	104,119
Harrison	3,588	71.63%	619	12.36%	782	15.61%	20	0.40%	2,806	56.02%	5,009
Hartley	484	93.08%	26	5.00%	10	1.92%	0	0.00%	458	88.08%	520
Haskell	2,573	83.46%	261	8.47%	249	8.08%	0	0.00%	2,312	74.99%	3,083
Hays	1,690	69.60%	495	20.39%	241	9.93%	2	0.08%	1,195	49.22%	2,428
Hemphill	792	69.29%	274	23.97%	70	6.12%	7	0.61%	518	45.32%	1,143
Henderson	3,219	76.28%	427	10.12%	566	13.41%	8	0.19%	2,653	62.87%	4,220
Hidalgo	7,250	59.26%	4,080	33.35%	865	7.07%	39	0.32%	3,170	25.91%	12,234
Hill	4,876	81.48%	516	8.62%	582	9.73%	10	0.17%	4,294	71.76%	5,984
Hockley	2,641	78.44%	319	9.47%	400	11.88%	7	0.21%	2,241	66.56%	3,367
Hood	1,203	81.73%	146	9.92%	120	8.15%	3	0.20%	1,057	71.81%	1,472
Hopkins	3,981	81.64%	533	10.93%	348	7.14%	14	0.29%	3,448	70.71%	4,876
Houston	2,329	74.03%	233	7.41%	584	18.56%	0	0.00%	1,745	55.47%	3,146
Howard	3,588	82.79%	334	7.71%	404	9.32%	8	0.18%	3,184	73.47%	4,334
Hudspeth	333	84.09%	35	8.84%	28	7.07%	0	0.00%	298	75.25%	396
Hunt	6,200	77.14%	714	8.88%	1,105	13.75%	18	0.22%	5,095	63.39%	8,037
Hutchinson	2,760	72.14%	864	22.58%	196	5.12%	6	0.16%	1,896	49.56%	3,826
Irion	363	80.13%	54	11.92%	35	7.73%	1	0.22%	309	68.21%	453
Jack	1,484	75.52%	217	11.04%	264	13.44%	0	0.00%	1,220	62.09%	1,965
Jackson	1,708	74.39%	344	14.98%	244	10.63%	0	0.00%	1,364	59.41%	2,296
Jasper	1,850	76.23%	341	14.05%	235	9.68%	1	0.04%	1,509	62.18%	2,427
Jeff Davis	331	79.38%	51	12.23%	35	8.39%	0	0.00%	280	67.15%	417
Jefferson	22,066	75.88%	4,525	15.56%	2,445	8.41%	44	0.15%	17,541	60.32%	29,080
Jim Hogg	620	86.96%	77	10.80%	16	2.24%	0	0.00%	543	76.16%	713
Jim Wells	1,908	59.79%	1,113	34.88%	167	5.23%	3	0.09%	795	24.91%	3,191
Johnson	4,757	80.68%	546	9.26%	582	9.87%	11	0.19%	4,175	70.81%	5,896
Jones	3,417	83.00%	361	8.77%	336	8.16%	3	0.07%	3,056	74.23%	4,117
Karnes	1,920	67.23%	692	24.23%	241	8.44%	3	0.11%	1,228	43.00%	2,856
Kaufman	4,251	82.77%	430	8.37%	441	8.59%	14	0.27%	3,810	74.18%	5,136
Kendall	309	17.54%	1,337	75.88%	114	6.47%	2	0.11%	-1,028	-58.34%	1,762
Kenedy	16	19.51%	60	73.17%	5	6.10%	1	1.22%	-44	-53.66%	82
Kent	572	86.93%	31	4.71%	55	8.36%	0	0.00%	517	78.57%	658
Kerr	1,377	46.79%	1,358	46.14%	204	6.93%	4	0.14%	19	0.65%	2,943
Kimble	880	70.57%	225	18.04%	142	11.39%	0	0.00%	655	52.53%	1,247
King	228	89.06%	13	5.08%	15	5.86%	0	0.00%	213	83.20%	256
Kinney	401	66.61%	200	33.22%	1	0.17%	0	0.00%	201	33.39%	602
Kleberg	1,473	75.27%	421	21.51%	59	3.01%	4	0.20%	1,052	53.76%	1,957
Knox	1,785	83.33%	156	7.28%	199	9.29%	2	0.09%	1,586	74.04%	2,142
Lamar	6,283	81.10%	725	9.36%	732	9.45%	7	0.09%	5,551	71.65%	7,747
Lamb	2,407	69.89%	616	17.89%	415	12.05%	6	0.17%	1,791	52.00%	3,444
Lampasas	1,693	81.95%	212	10.26%	160	7.74%	1	0.05%	1,481	71.68%	2,066
La Salle	692	80.47%	127	14.77%	41	4.77%	0	0.00%	565	65.70%	860
Lavaca	3,406	68.74%	960	19.37%	580	11.71%	9	0.18%	2,446	49.36%	4,955
Lee	953	43.40%	771	35.11%	463	21.08%	9	0.41%	182	8.29%	2,196
Leon	1,569	82.67%	140	7.38%	189	9.96%	0	0.00%	1,380	72.71%	1,898
Liberty	2,561	74.12%	336	9.73%	551	15.95%	7	0.20%	2,010	58.18%	3,455
Limestone	4,299	84.99%	239	4.73%	514	10.16%	6	0.12%	3,785	74.83%	5,058
Lipscomb	551	53.39%	396	38.37%	76	7.36%	9	0.87%	155	15.02%	1,032
Live Oak	642	45.69%	548	39.00%	212	15.09%	3	0.21%	94	6.69%	1,405
Llano	1,199	77.96%	198	12.87%	140	9.10%	1	0.07%	1,001	65.08%	1,538
Loving	60	71.43%	18	21.43%	6	7.14%	0	0.00%	42	50.00%	84
Lubbock	7,654	70.50%	1,169	10.77%	2,021	18.62%	12	0.11%	5,633	51.89%	10,856
Lynn	1,968	78.94%	263	10.55%	256	10.27%	6	0.24%	1,705	68.39%	2,493
Madison	1,115	85.31%	65	4.97%	125	9.56%	2	0.15%	990	75.75%	1,307
Marion	1,057	76.54%	219	15.86%	104	7.53%	1	0.07%	838	60.68%	1,381
Martin	758	76.88%	131	13.29%	97	9.84%	0	0.00%	627	63.59%	986
Mason	822	54.95%	420	28.07%	248	16.58%	6	0.40%	402	26.87%	1,496
Matagorda	1,854	60.45%	412	13.43%	798	26.02%	3	0.10%	1,056	34.43%	3,067
Maverick	787	70.14%	302	26.92%	30	2.67%	3	0.27%	485	43.23%	1,122
McCulloch	2,088	74.47%	463	16.51%	251	8.95%	2	0.07%	1,625	57.95%	2,804
McLennan	15,336	82.31%	1,668	8.95%	1,591	8.54%	36	0.19%	13,668	73.36%	18,631
McMullen	223	59.47%	106	28.27%	45	12.00%	1	0.27%	117	31.20%	375
Medina	1,469	43.35%	1,607	47.42%	311	9.18%	2	0.06%	-138	-4.07%	3,389
Menard	776	69.16%	96	8.56%	250	22.28%	0	0.00%	526	46.88%	1,122
Midland	1,688	57.63%	302	10.31%	938	32.02%	1	0.03%	750	25.61%	2,929
Milam	3,537	71.11%	623	12.53%	803	16.14%	11	0.22%	2,734	54.97%	4,974
Mills	1,428	78.59%	172	9.47%	216	11.89%	1	0.06%	1,212	66.70%	1,817
Mitchell	2,215	86.09%	218	8.47%	138	5.36%	2	0.08%	1,997	77.61%	2,573
Montague	2,900	78.17%	429	11.56%	375	10.11%	6	0.16%	2,471	66.60%	3,710
Montgomery	2,902	80.17%	219	6.05%	493	13.62%	6	0.17%	2,409	66.55%	3,620
Moore	999	71.66%	313	22.45%	80	5.74%	2	0.14%	686	49.21%	1,394
Morris	1,269	85.98%	122	8.27%	85	5.76%	0	0.00%	1,147	77.71%	1,476
Motley	744	79.57%	107	11.44%	79	8.45%	5	0.53%	637	68.13%	935
Nacogdoches	3,226	77.14%	319	7.63%	619	14.80%	18	0.43%	2,607	62.34%	4,182
Navarro	6,298	85.10%	449	6.07%	639	8.63%	15	0.20%	5,659	76.46%	7,401
Newton	910	74.35%	187	15.28%	124	10.13%	3	0.25%	723	59.07%	1,224
Nolan	3,071	81.96%	322	8.59%	349	9.31%	5	0.13%	2,722	72.64%	3,747
Nueces	11,091	70.32%	3,819	24.21%	835	5.29%	28	0.18%	7,272	46.10%	15,773
Ochiltree	863	65.93%	307	23.45%	136	10.39%	3	0.23%	556	42.48%	1,309
Oldham	277	67.73%	93	22.74%	36	8.80%	3	0.73%	184	44.99%	409
Orange	4,500	77.05%	910	15.58%	421	7.21%	9	0.15%	3,590	61.47%	5,840
Palo Pinto	3,291	79.76%	416	10.08%	410	9.94%	9	0.22%	2,875	69.68%	4,126
Panola	2,106	84.17%	221	8.83%	164	6.55%	11	0.44%	1,885	75.34%	2,502
Parker	3,503	76.90%	559	12.27%	476	10.45%	17	0.37%	2,944	64.63%	4,555
Parmer	810	58.53%	415	29.99%	157	11.34%	2	0.14%	395	28.54%	1,384
Pecos	1,226	74.17%	305	18.45%	120	7.26%	2	0.12%	921	55.72%	1,653
Polk	1,817	80.61%	154	6.83%	280	12.42%	3	0.13%	1,537	68.19%	2,254
Potter	6,519	64.65%	2,759	27.36%	783	7.76%	23	0.23%	3,760	37.29%	10,084
Presidio	648	63.28%	211	20.61%	165	16.11%	0	0.00%	437	42.68%	1,024
Rains	628	68.56%	137	14.96%	149	16.27%	2	0.22%	479	52.29%	916
Randall	1,439	68.04%	409	19.34%	263	12.43%	4	0.19%	1,030	48.70%	2,115
Reagan	426	81.92%	53	10.19%	40	7.69%	1	0.19%	373	71.73%	520
Real	326	59.38%	163	29.69%	59	10.75%	1	0.18%	163	29.69%	549
Red River	2,991	78.24%	466	12.19%	361	9.44%	5	0.13%	2,525	66.05%	3,823
Reeves	1,157	76.62%	201	13.31%	149	9.87%	3	0.20%	956	63.31%	1,510
Refugio	991	67.51%	376	25.61%	96	6.54%	5	0.34%	615	41.89%	1,468
Roberts	289	69.14%	89	21.29%	37	8.85%	3	0.72%	200	47.85%	418
Robertson	2,681	88.13%	126	4.14%	231	7.59%	4	0.13%	2,450	80.54%	3,042
Rockwall	1,153	84.90%	98	7.22%	98	7.22%	9	0.66%	1,055	77.69%	1,358
Runnels	2,657	70.16%	685	18.09%	438	11.57%	7	0.18%	1,972	52.07%	3,787
Rusk	5,232	76.45%	637	9.31%	973	14.22%	2	0.03%	4,259	62.23%	6,844
Sabine	1,169	80.68%	203	14.01%	75	5.18%	2	0.14%	966	66.67%	1,449
San Augustine	1,176	92.02%	102	7.98%	0	0.00%	0	0.00%	1,074	84.04%	1,278
San Jacinto	522	72.50%	53	7.36%	145	20.14%	0	0.00%	377	52.36%	720
San Patricio	2,712	70.61%	878	22.86%	242	6.30%	9	0.23%	1,834	47.75%	3,841
San Saba	2,109	88.13%	177	7.40%	104	4.35%	3	0.13%	1,932	80.74%	2,393
Schleicher	520	74.82%	84	12.09%	89	12.81%	2	0.29%	431	62.01%	695
Scurry	1,761	80.93%	285	13.10%	130	5.97%	0	0.00%	1,476	67.83%	2,176
Shackelford	1,007	75.21%	135	10.08%	194	14.49%	3	0.22%	813	60.72%	1,339
Shelby	2,927	82.13%	428	12.01%	205	5.75%	4	0.11%	2,499	70.12%	3,564
Sherman	454	77.74%	97	16.61%	32	5.48%	1	0.17%	357	61.13%	584
Smith	6,671	69.94%	936	9.81%	1,921	20.14%	10	0.10%	4,750	49.80%	9,538
Somervell	406	65.38%	87	14.01%	127	20.45%	1	0.16%	279	44.93%	621
Starr	1,312	94.05%	68	4.87%	15	1.08%	0	0.00%	1,244	89.18%	1,395
Stephens	2,104	75.04%	217	7.74%	479	17.08%	4	0.14%	1,625	57.95%	2,804
Sterling	330	92.18%	18	5.03%	10	2.79%	0	0.00%	312	87.15%	358
Stonewall	902	83.52%	89	8.24%	89	8.24%	0	0.00%	813	75.28%	1,080
Sutton	449	70.60%	118	18.55%	69	10.85%	0	0.00%	331	52.04%	636
Swisher	1,275	70.09%	331	18.20%	208	11.43%	5	0.27%	944	51.90%	1,819
Tarrant	36,791	72.05%	4,113	8.05%	10,161	19.90%	0	0.00%	26,630	52.15%	51,065
Taylor	7,975	81.86%	602	6.18%	1,149	11.79%	16	0.16%	6,826	70.07%	9,742
Terrell	329	65.28%	156	30.95%	17	3.37%	2	0.40%	173	34.33%	504
Terry	2,304	82.88%	273	9.82%	203	7.30%	0	0.00%	2,031	73.06%	2,780
Throckmorton	970	81.93%	76	6.42%	135	11.40%	3	0.25%	835	70.52%	1,184
Titus	2,612	84.07%	265	8.53%	226	7.27%	4	0.13%	2,347	75.54%	3,107
Tom Green	6,272	75.51%	1,125	13.54%	891	10.73%	18	0.22%	5,147	61.97%	8,306
Travis	14,384	74.80%	2,324	12.09%	2,496	12.98%	26	0.14%	11,888	61.82%	19,230
Trinity	1,132	73.13%	127	8.20%	287	18.54%	2	0.13%	845	54.59%	1,548
Tyler	1,037	72.98%	219	15.41%	162	11.40%	3	0.21%	818	57.57%	1,421
Upshur	2,369	70.32%	446	13.24%	548	16.27%	6	0.18%	1,821	54.05%	3,369
Upton	742	81.09%	105	11.48%	66	7.21%	2	0.22%	637	69.62%	915
Uvalde	1,322	56.11%	856	36.33%	166	7.05%	12	0.51%	466	19.78%	2,356
Val Verde	1,210	60.96%	676	34.06%	98	4.94%	1	0.05%	534	26.90%	1,985
Van Zandt	3,139	74.65%	503	11.96%	540	12.84%	23	0.55%	2,599	61.81%	4,205
Victoria	2,331	63.27%	936	25.41%	415	11.26%	2	0.05%	1,395	37.87%	3,684
Walker	1,638	80.41%	145	7.12%	254	12.47%	0	0.00%	1,384	67.94%	2,037
Waller	1,007	70.13%	190	13.23%	234	16.30%	5	0.35%	773	53.83%	1,436
Ward	1,448	79.60%	268	14.73%	97	5.33%	6	0.33%	1,180	64.87%	1,819
Washington	1,387	34.46%	534	13.27%	2,101	52.20%	3	0.07%	-714 (Note: In this county where the unpledged "Texas Regulars" ran ahead of both Roosevelt and Dewey, margin given is Roosevelt vote minus Texas Regulars vote and percentage margin Roosevelt percentage minus Texas Regulars percentage.)	-17.74%	4,025
Webb	4,742	85.12%	776	13.93%	47	0.84%	6	0.11%	3,966	71.19%	5,571
Wharton	3,754	74.45%	529	10.49%	754	14.95%	5	0.10%	3,000	59.50%	5,042
Wheeler	1,869	71.47%	511	19.54%	228	8.72%	7	0.27%	1,358	51.93%	2,615
Wichita	11,392	77.94%	1,597	10.93%	1,609	11.01%	18	0.12%	9,783	66.93%	14,616
Wilbarger	3,382	76.53%	517	11.70%	513	11.61%	7	0.16%	2,865	64.83%	4,419
Willacy	846	48.70%	754	43.41%	133	7.66%	4	0.23%	92	5.30%	1,737
Williamson	5,284	71.11%	1,239	16.67%	885	11.91%	23	0.31%	4,045	54.43%	7,431
Wilson	2,666	75.46%	676	19.13%	185	5.24%	6	0.17%	1,990	56.33%	3,533
Winkler	1,004	84.16%	120	10.06%	68	5.70%	1	0.08%	884	74.10%	1,193
Wise	3,114	78.26%	444	11.16%	413	10.38%	8	0.20%	2,670	67.10%	3,979
Wood	3,045	75.35%	485	12.00%	503	12.45%	8	0.20%	2,542	62.91%	4,041
Yoakum	646	77.00%	106	12.63%	86	10.25%	1	0.12%	540	64.36%	839
Young	3,183	77.37%	327	7.95%	596	14.49%	8	0.19%	2,587	62.88%	4,114
Zapata	501	91.59%	43	7.86%	3	0.55%	0	0.00%	458	83.73%	547
Zavala	696	61.65%	342	30.29%	90	7.97%	1	0.09%	354	31.36%	1,129
Totals	821,605	71.42%	191,423	16.64%	135,411	11.77%	1,896	0.16%	630,182	54.78%	1,150,335

==== Counties that flipped from Democratic to Republican ====
- Bandera
- Medina

==== Counties that flipped from Republican to Democratic ====
- Lee

==== Counties that flipped from Republican to Unpledged ====
- Washington

== See also ==
- United States presidential elections in Texas
