= Zionville, Texas =

Ghost town in Texas, US

Zionville
- Ghost town
- Location in Texas
- Coordinates: 30.2018815°N 96.4913577°W
- Country: United States
- State: Texas
- County: Washington
- Elevation: 400 ft (122 m)

Zionville is a ghost town in Washington County, Texas, United States.

== History ==
Zionville is situated south of the intersection of Farm to Market Roads 390 and 2679. The town was named after the Zion Lutheran Church in the town, which was established in 1870 by William Pfennig. A post office operated from 1872 to 1880, with Adolph Streckert serving as postmaster. The town received many Prussian immigrants in the 1870s. From the 1930s, the town declined. In 1970, a new church, the new Zion Lutheran Church, was constructed.
