= Burton Commercial Historic District =

Historic district in Texas, United States

- U.S. National Register of Historic Places
- U.S. Historic district
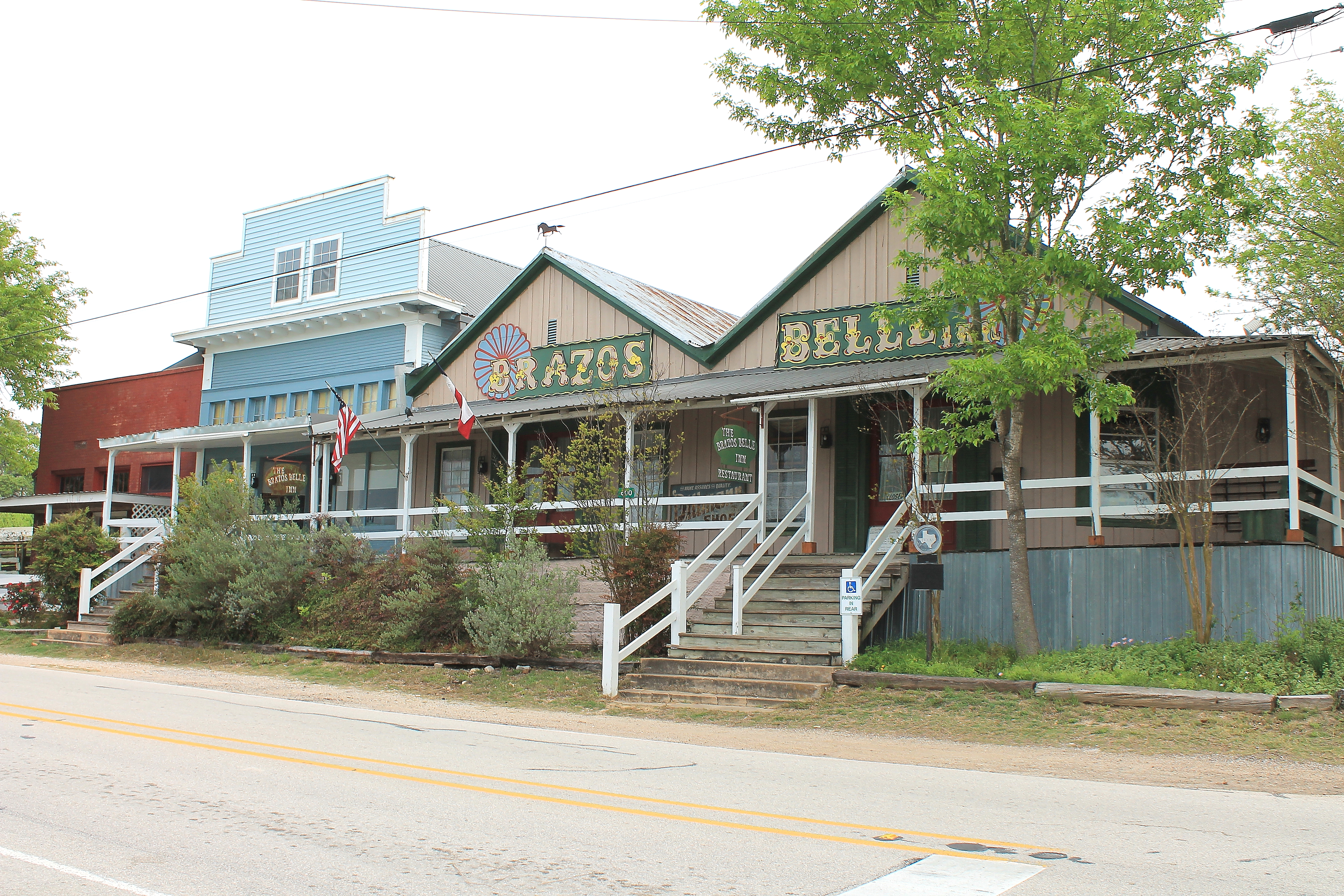
- Steiner & Dallmeyer Building in 2013

- Location within Texas Location within the United States
- Location: Roughly bounded by Railroad, Live Oak, Brazos and Burton, including area S of Railroad between Washington and Texas Sts., Burton, Texas
- Coordinates: 30°10′54″N 96°35′45″W
- Area: 12 acres (4.9 ha)
- Built: 1870
- Architectural style: One-part commercial block
- MPS: Burton MPS
- NRHP reference No.: 91000709
- Added to NRHP: June 11, 1991

The Burton Commercial Historic District is located in Burton, Texas.

The district encompasses all or parts of seven city blocks. It contains 47 buildings, 28 of them classified as contributing. The buildings include retail stores, industrial buildings, a railroad depot and a portion of the railway right-of-way. The district was added to the National Register of Historic Places on June 11, 1991.

== Buildings ==
Notable buildings in the district include:

- H. Knittel Store Annex-one-story frame building constructed in 1880
- Meat Market-one-story brick building constructed around 1900 for F.W.E. Fischer, a prominent and early Burton merchant.
- Chamber of Commerce-Modern miniature frame building built around 1950 by Will Weeren.
- Farmer's Cotton Warehouse-one-story frame warehouse
- Homeyer Lumber Company-one-story frame building constructed around 1900. Lumber company was founded in 1881 by Charles W. Homeyer, a Burton resident.
- Old Burton State Bank-This one-story building served as Burton's first and only state bank from 1906 to 1965. Today it houses municipal offices.
- The Barber Shop-one-story building was built in 1906 for Fritz Buch as a grocery store. The barber shop operated from 1906 to 1986.
- Burton Auto Company-one-story building constructed in 1916 as the City Garage.
- The Steiner & Dallmeyer Building, home of the Brazos Belle Restaurant

== Gallery ==
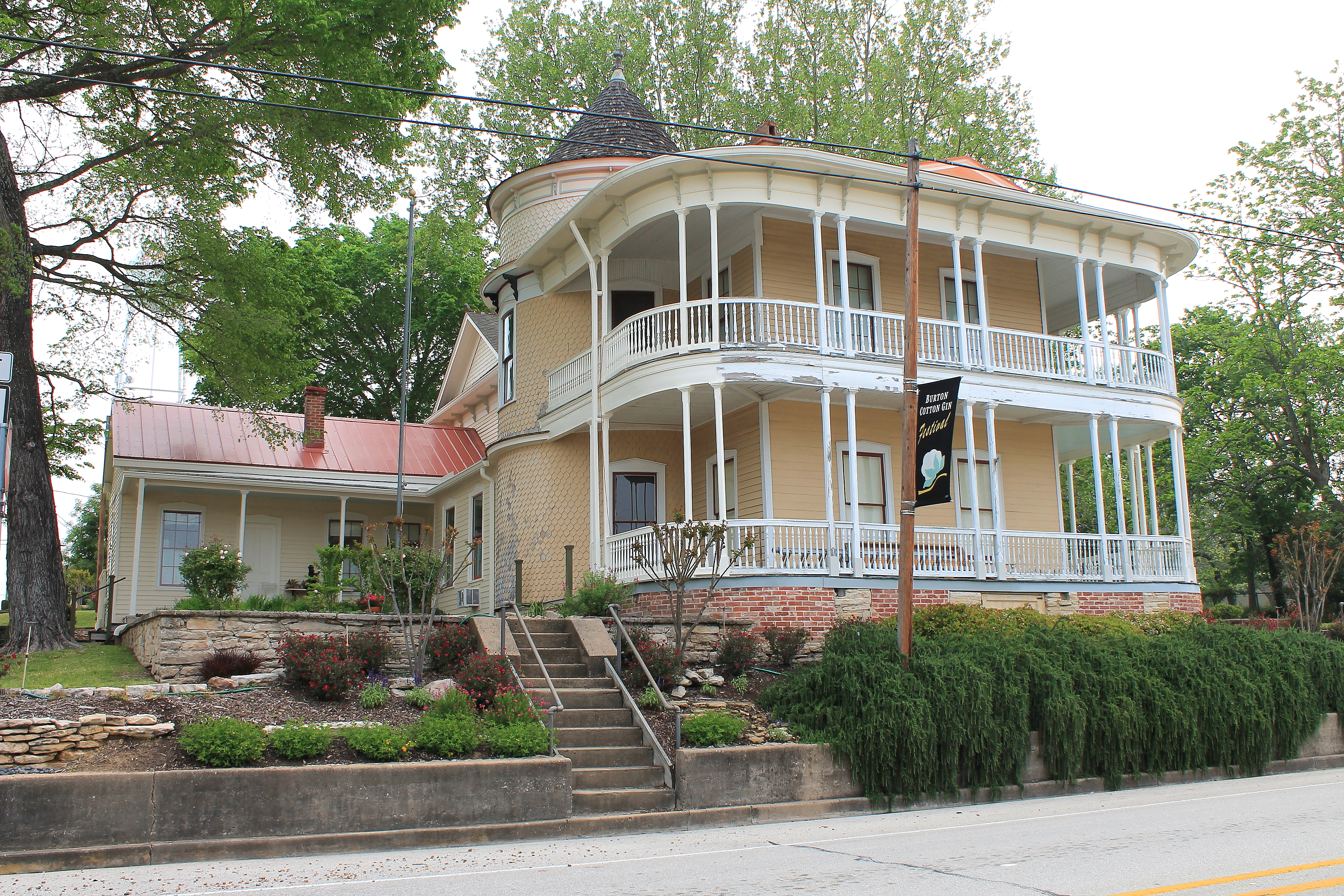

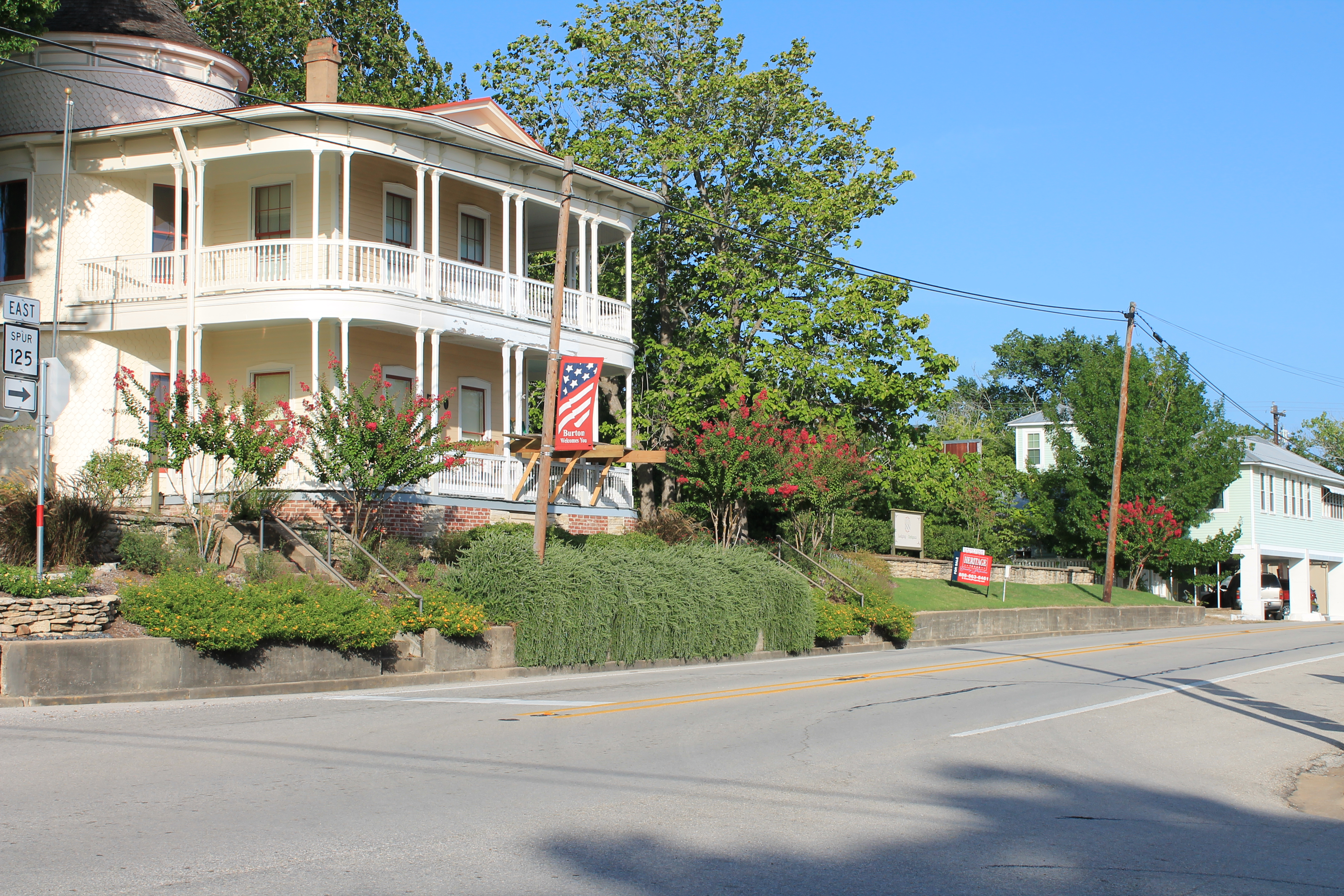

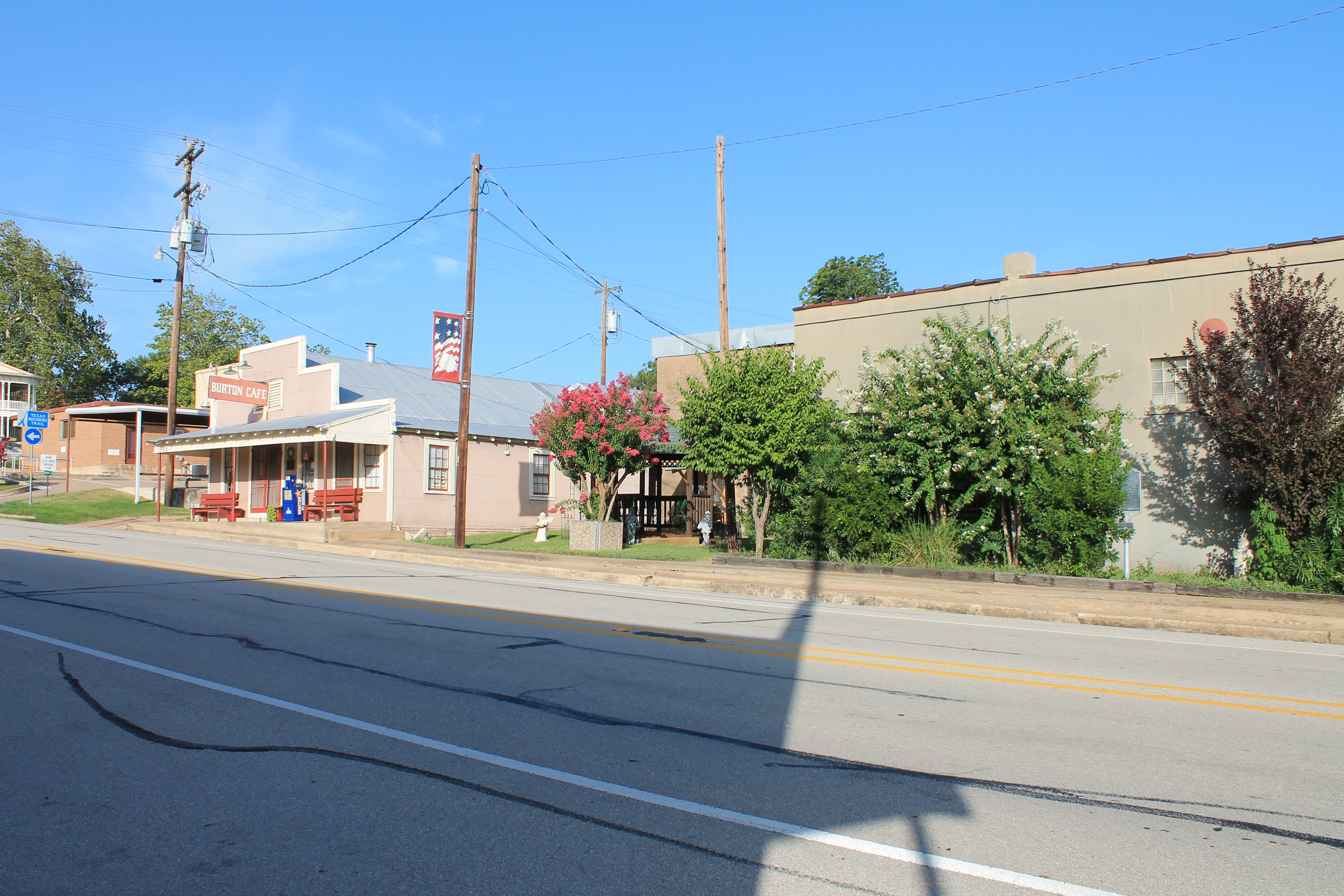

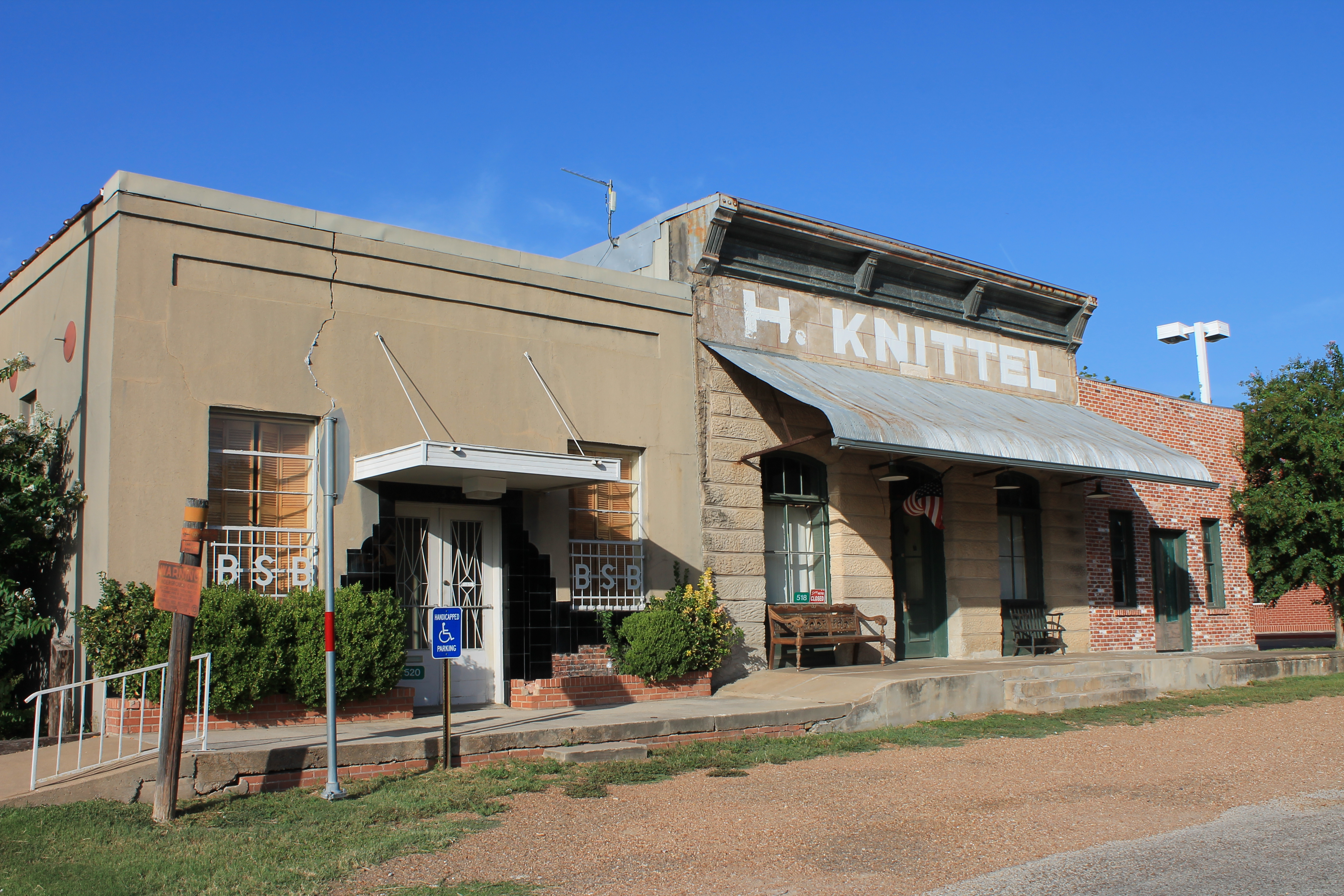

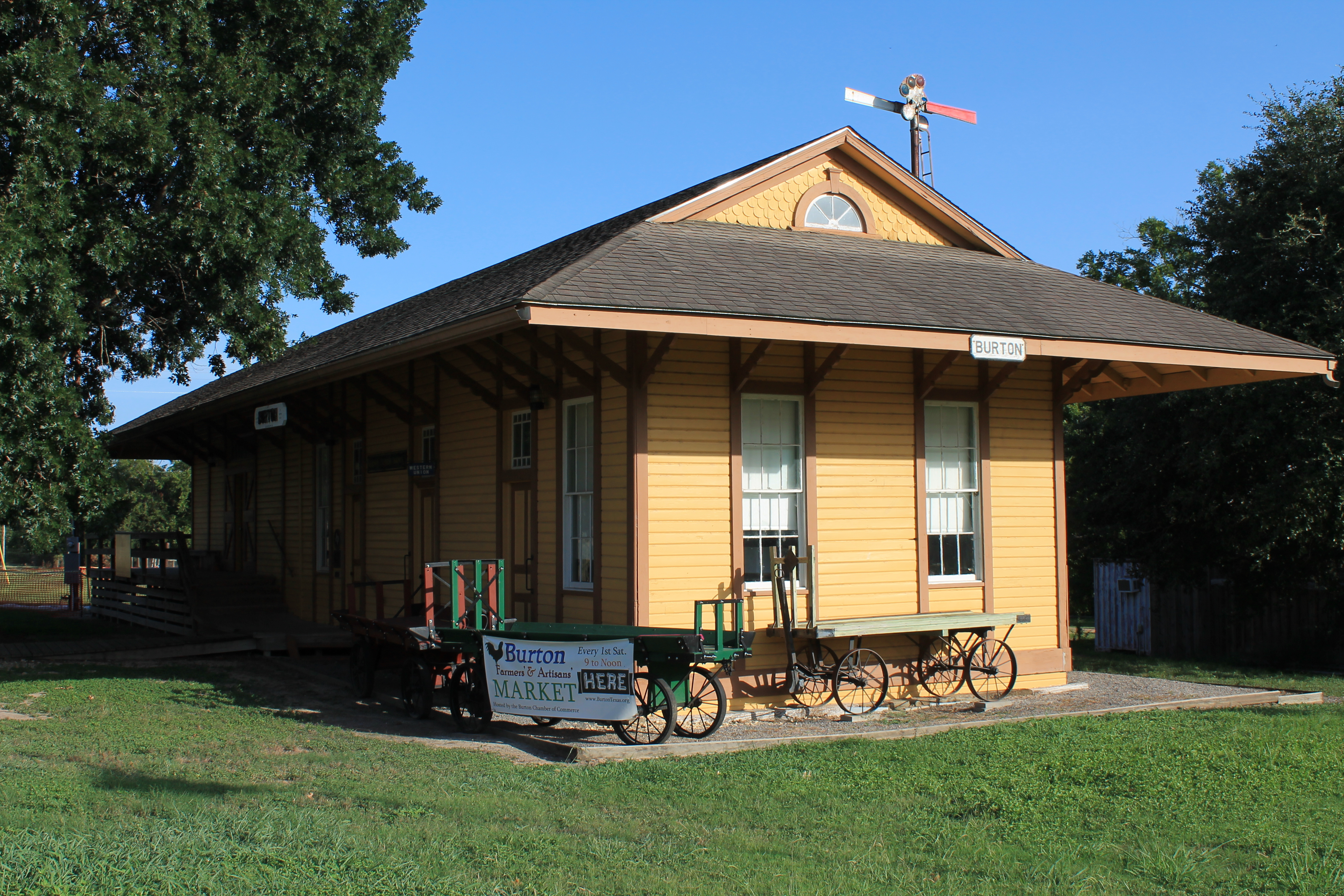

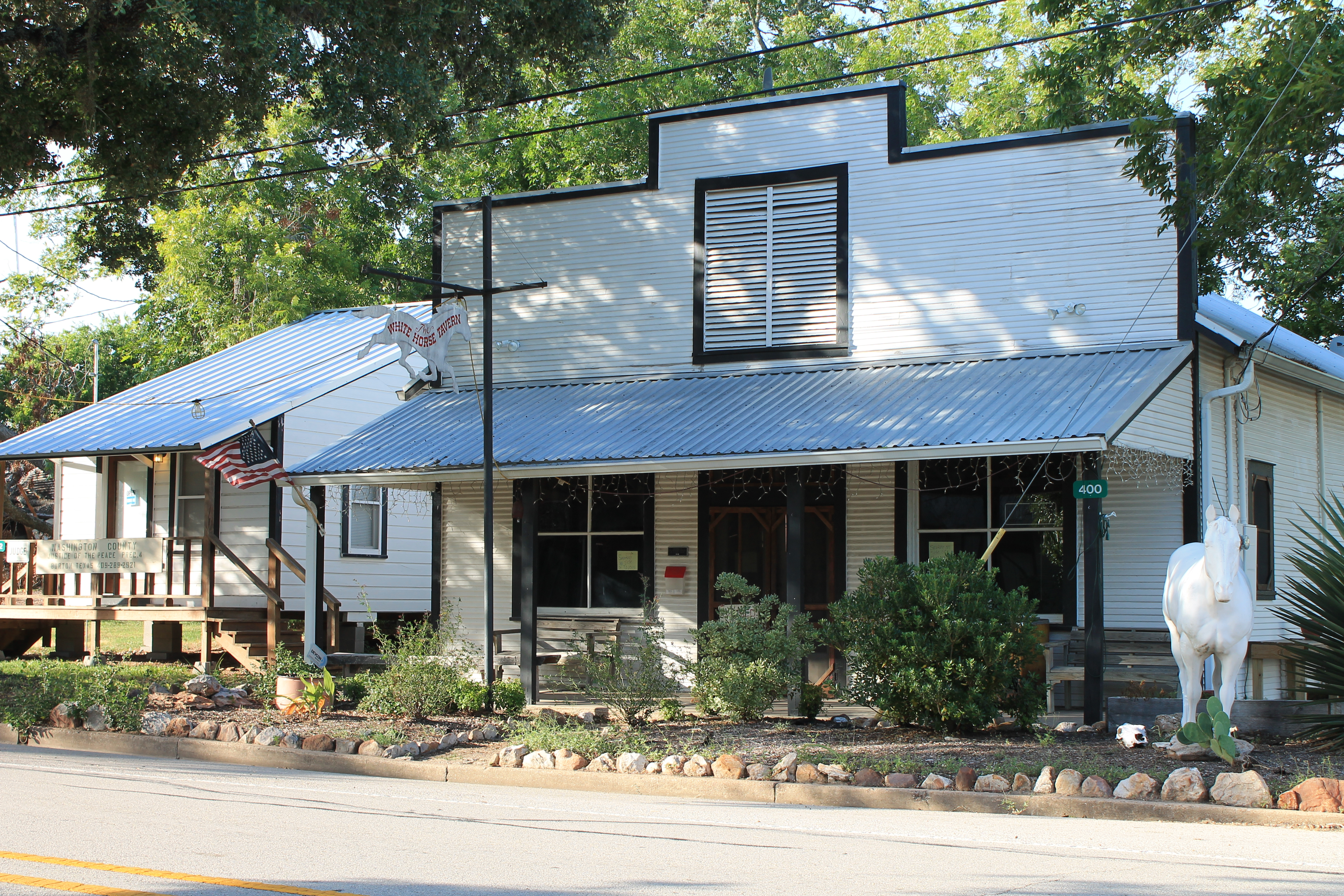

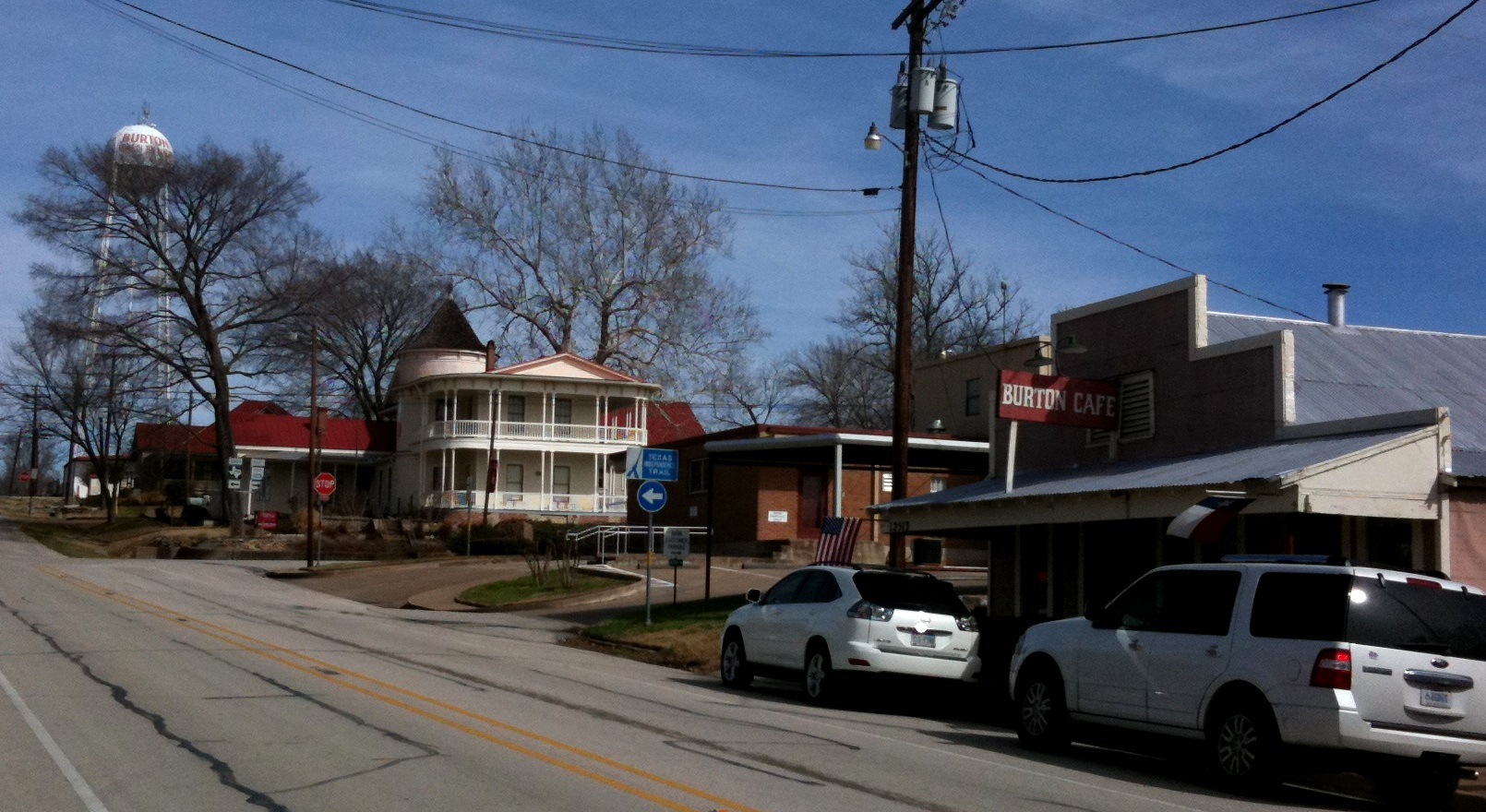

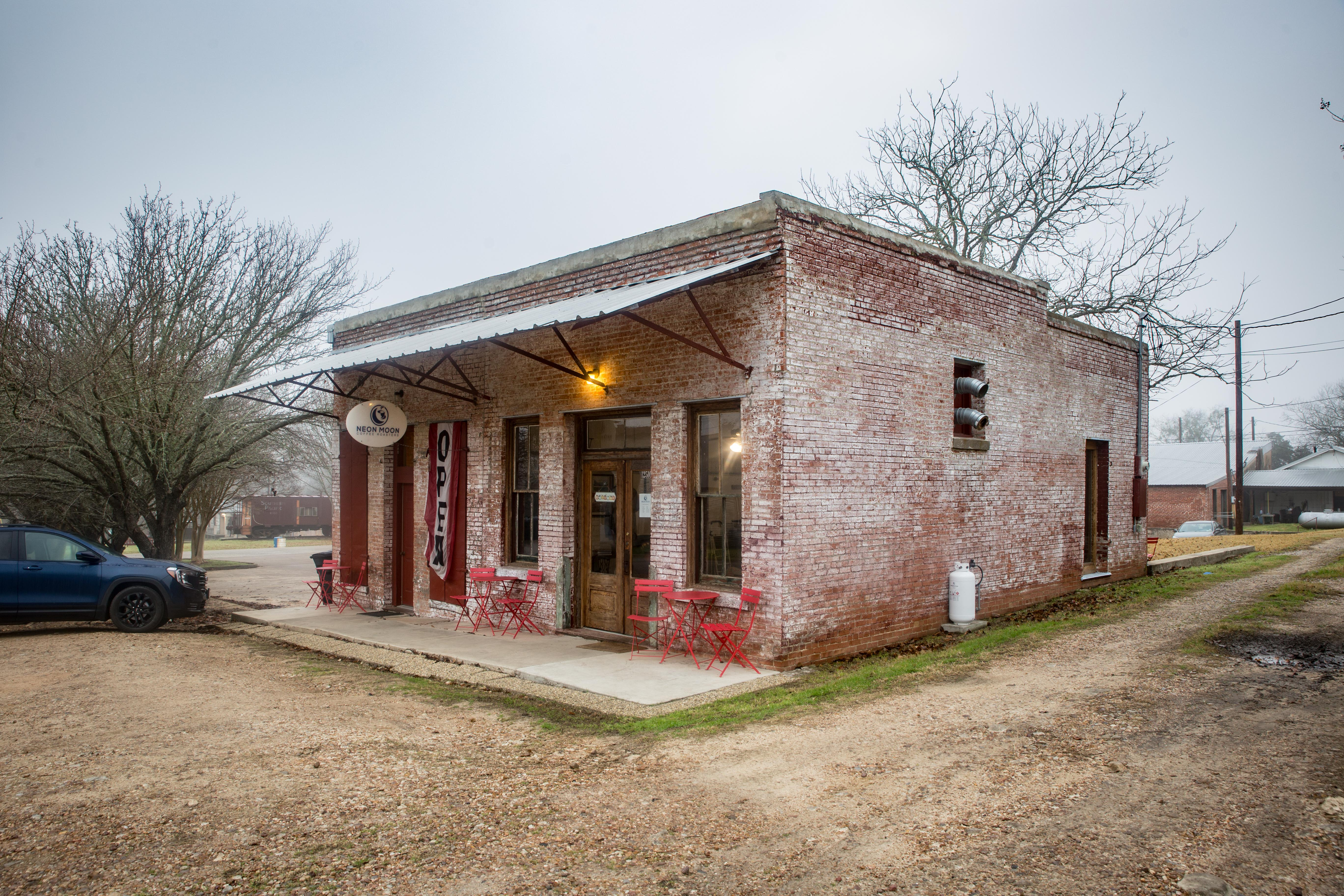

== See also ==
- National Register of Historic Places listings in Washington County, Texas
- Recorded Texas Historic Landmarks in Washington County
