= Wilcox, Burleson County, Texas =

- Unincorporated community
- Location within Texas Location within the United States
- Coordinates: 30°26′46″N 96°22′46″W
- Country: United States
- State: Texas
- County: Burleson
- Elevation: 207 ft (63 m)
- Time zone: UTC-6 (Central (CST))
  - Summer (DST): UTC-5 (CDT)
- Area code: 979
- GNIS feature ID: 1380780

Wilcox is an unincorporated community in Burleson County, Texas, United States. According to the Handbook of Texas, the community had a population of 40 in 2000. It is located within the Bryan-College Station metropolitan area.

== Geography ==
Wilcox is located at the intersection of Texas State Highway 50 and Farm to Market Road 1361, 5 mi (8.0 km) southeast of Snook in southeastern Burleson County.

== Education ==
Today, Wilcox is served by the Snook Independent School District.
