= Rock Island, Washington County, Texas =

Rock Island
- Ghost town
- Location within Texas Location within the United States
- Coordinates: 30.180750°N 96.166909°W
- Country: United States
- State: Texas
- County: Washington
- Settled: 1830s
- Post Office: 1849-1857
- Abandoned: 1857
- Founded by: Barbara Groce Clarke, granddaughter of Jared E. Groce
- Named after: Small island in Brazos River

Rock Island is a historical settlement located on the Brazos River in Washington County, Texas, United States, northeast of Chappell Hill, and northwest of Hempstead. It emerged from a pre-Texas Republic era plantation named Rock Island for a small island in the Brazos. Conflicting histories place the site either east of the Brazos River in Waller County or west of the river in Washington County. This could be explained by the apparent change in the path of the river at that spot during the existence of Rock Island.

By 1837, the plantation had a general store, inn, cotton gin, blacksmith, and a growing population but lost its bid for the county seat. The settlement benefitted by the addition of a ferry crossing and the Rock Island Academy. Rock Island had a post office 1849-1857. In 1857, the railroad was built east of the Brazos establishing the new community of Hempstead but did not cross the Brazos leading to the decline in Rock Island.
