= Burton Independent School District =

School district in Texas

Address
- 701 North Railroad Street Burton, Texas, 77835; United States
- Coordinates: 30.182°N 96.598°W

District information
- Type: Public
- Grades: PK–12
- Schools: 2
- NCES District ID: 4812240

Students and staff
- Students: 588 (2023–2024)
- Teachers: 50.00 (on an FTE basis) (2023–2024)
- Staff: 43.15 (on an FTE basis) (2023–2024)
- Student–teacher ratio: 11.76 (2023–2024)

Other information
- Website: www.burtonisd.net

Burton Independent School District is a public school district based in Burton, Washington County, Texas, USA.

In 2009, the school district was rated "academically acceptable" by the Texas Education Agency.

== Schools ==
Burton High School

Location
- 917 North Main Street; Burton, (Washington County), Texas 77835; United States

Information
- Type: Public high school
- Principal: Micah Goebel
- Staff: 24.85 (FTE)
- Enrollment: 222 (2023-24)
- Student to teacher ratio: 8.93
- Colors: Red, black and white
- Nickname: Panthers
- Website: Burton High School

- Burton High School (grades 7-12)
- Burton Elementary (prekindergarten-grade 6)

== Notable alumni ==
- Dee Winters (2019), professional football player, San Francisco 49ers
