= Washington County, Texas =

County in Texas, United States

- County
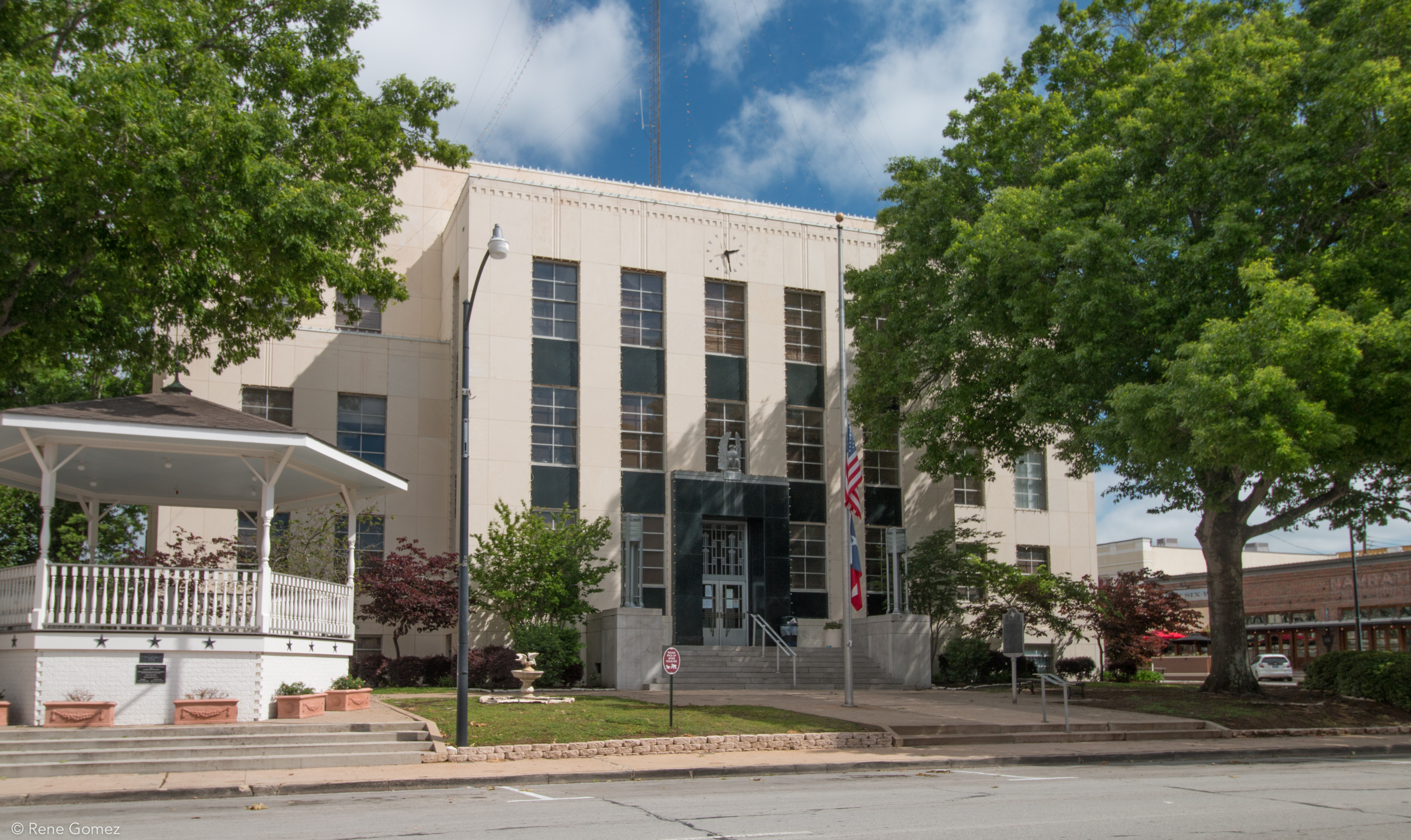
- The Washington County Courthouse in Brenham

- Location within the U.S. state of Texas
- Coordinates: 30°13′N 96°25′W
- Country: United States
- State: Texas
- Founded: 1837
- Named for: George Washington
- Seat: Brenham
- Largest city: Brenham

Area
  - Total: 622 sq mi (1,610 km^{2})
  - Land: 604 sq mi (1,560 km^{2})
  - Water: 18 sq mi (47 km^{2}) 2.9%

Population (2020)
  - Total: 35,805
  - Estimate (2025): 38,288 ▲
  - Density: 58/sq mi (22/km^{2})
- Time zone: UTC−6 (Central)
  - Summer (DST): UTC−5 (CDT)
- Congressional district: 10th
- Website: www.co.washington.tx.us

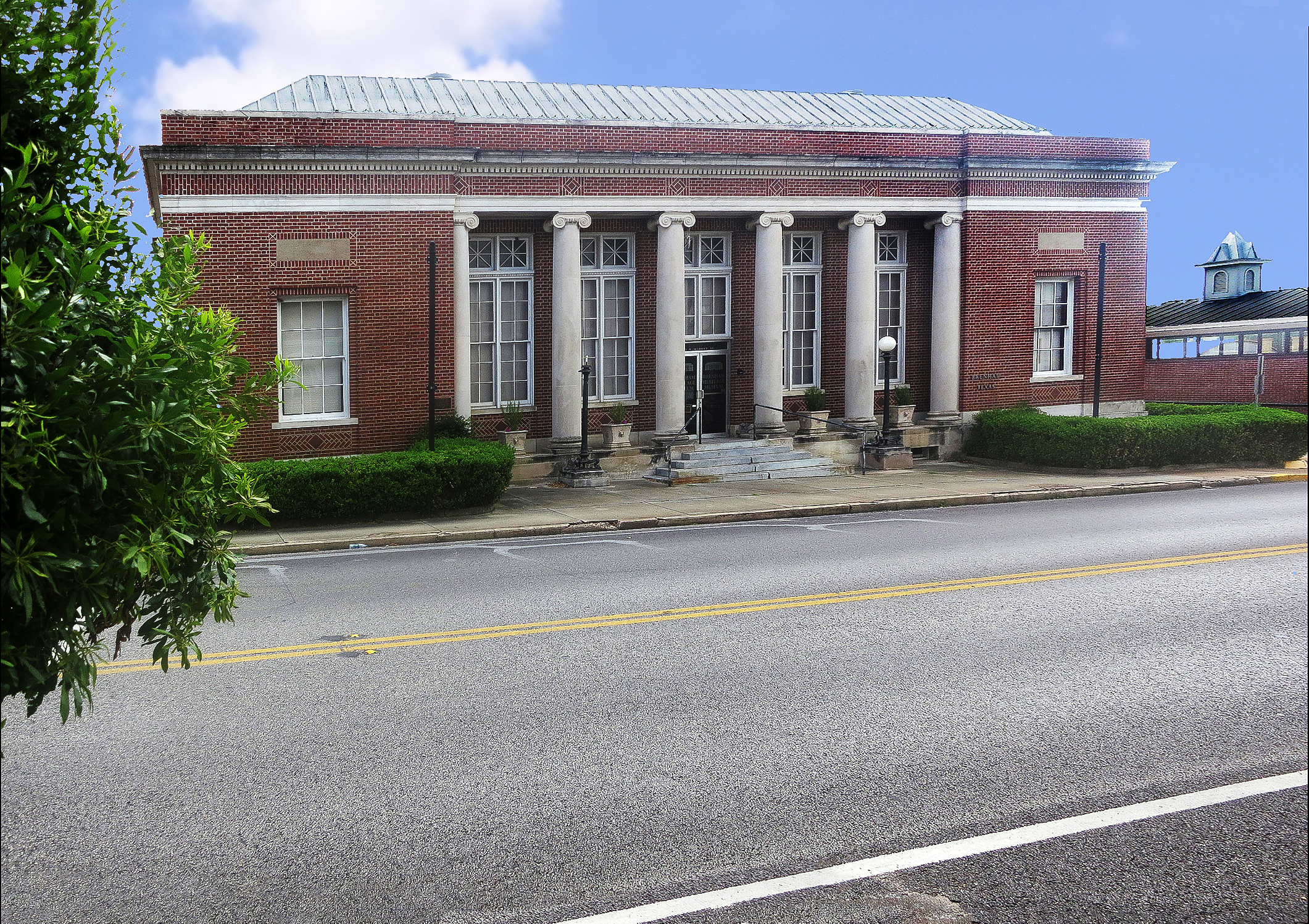
Brenham Heritage Museum

Washington County is a county in southeastern Texas. As of the 2020 census, its population was 35,805. Its county seat is Brenham, which is located along U.S. Highway 290, 72 miles northwest of Houston. The county was created in 1835 as a municipality of Mexico and organized as a county in 1837. It is named for George Washington, the first president of the United States.

Washington County comprises the Brenham, TX micropolitan statistical area, which is also included in the Houston-The Woodlands, TX combined statistical area.

Washington-on-the-Brazos in the county is notable as the site of the signing of the Texas Declaration of Independence during the Convention of 1836. Reflecting the county's history as a destination of mid-19th-century German immigrants who came after the 1848 German revolutions, in the 2000 US Census, more than one-third of residents identified as being of German ancestry.

== Geography ==
According to the U.S. Census Bureau, the county has a total area of 622 square miles (1,610 km^{2}), of which 18 square miles (47 km^{2}) (2.9%) are covered by water.

=== Major highways ===
- U.S. Highway 290
- State Highway 36
- State Highway 105
- State Highway 237
- Spur 125

=== Adjacent counties ===
- Brazos County (north)
- Grimes County (northeast)
- Waller County (east)
- Austin County (south)
- Fayette County (southwest)
- Lee County (west)
- Burleson County (northwest)

== Demographics ==
Historical population
Census	Pop.	Note	%±
1850	5,983		—
1860	15,215		154.3%
1870	23,104		51.9%
1880	27,565		19.3%
1890	29,161		5.8%
1900	32,931		12.9%
1910	25,561		−22.4%
1920	26,624		4.2%
1930	25,394		−4.6%
1940	25,387		0.0%
1950	20,542		−19.1%
1960	19,145		−6.8%
1970	18,842		−1.6%
1980	21,998		16.7%
1990	26,154		18.9%
2000	30,373		16.1%
2010	33,718		11.0%
2020	35,805		6.2%
2025 (est.)	38,288	▲	6.9%
U.S. Decennial Census; 1850–2010 2010 2020

=== 2020 census ===
As of the 2020 census, the county had a population of 35,805. The median age was 42.4 years. 21.1% of residents were under the age of 18 and 22.6% of residents were 65 years of age or older. For every 100 females there were 96.7 males, and for every 100 females age 18 and over there were 94.3 males age 18 and over.

The racial makeup of the county was 65.1% White, 15.7% Black or African American, 0.4% American Indian and Alaska Native, 1.6% Asian, 0.1% Native Hawaiian and Pacific Islander, 6.3% from some other race, and 10.9% from two or more races. Hispanic or Latino residents of any race comprised 17.9% of the population.

48.6% of residents lived in urban areas, while 51.4% lived in rural areas.

There were 13,906 households in the county, of which 28.2% had children under the age of 18 living in them. Of all households, 50.5% were married-couple households, 17.6% were households with a male householder and no spouse or partner present, and 27.6% were households with a female householder and no spouse or partner present. About 29.1% of all households were made up of individuals and 15.4% had someone living alone who was 65 years of age or older.

There were 16,838 housing units, of which 17.4% were vacant. Among occupied housing units, 71.8% were owner-occupied and 28.2% were renter-occupied. The homeowner vacancy rate was 1.9% and the rental vacancy rate was 8.9%.

=== Racial and ethnic composition ===
Washington County, Texas – Racial and ethnic composition Note: the US Census treats Hispanic/Latino as an ethnic category. This table excludes Latinos from the racial categories and assigns them to a separate category. Hispanics/Latinos may be of any race.
Race / Ethnicity (NH = Non-Hispanic)	Pop 1980	Pop 1990	Pop 2000	Pop 2010	Pop 2020	% 1980	% 1990	% 2000	% 2010	% 2020
White alone (NH)	16,391	19,321	21,515	22,394	22,023	74.51%	73.87%	70.84%	66.42%	61.51%
Black or African American alone (NH)	4,794	5,427	5,604	5,861	5,555	21.79%	20.75%	18.45%	17.38%	15.51%
Native American or Alaska Native alone (NH)	15	37	49	61	75	0.07%	0.14%	0.16%	0.18%	0.21%
Asian alone (NH)	73	181	363	432	547	0.33%	0.69%	1.20%	1.28%	1.53%
Native Hawaiian or Pacific Islander alone (NH)	x	x	1	7	14	x	x	0.00%	0.02%	0.04%
Other race alone (NH)	62	30	8	34	140	0.28%	0.11%	0.03%	0.10%	0.39%
Mixed race or Multiracial (NH)	x	x	186	288	1,026	x	x	0.61%	0.85%	2.87%
Hispanic or Latino (any race)	663	1,158	2,647	4,641	6,425	3.01%	4.43%	8.71%	13.76%	17.94%
Total	21,998	26,154	30,373	33,718	35,805	100.00%	100.00%	100.00%	100.00%	100.00%

=== 2000 census ===
As of the census of 2000, 30,373 people, 11,322 households, and 7,936 families were residing in the county. The population density was 50 people per square mile (19 people/km^{2}). There were 13,241 housing units at an average density of 22 units per square mile (8.5 units/km^{2}). The racial makeup of the county was 74.68% White, 18.66% African American, 0.27% Native American, 1.21% Asian, 4.02% from other races, and 1.16% from two or more races. About 8.71% of the population identified as Hispanic or Latino of any race; 33.6% identified as of German, 6.1% American, 5.7% English, 5.3% Irish, and 5.0% Polish ancestry according to Census 2000. Around 88.1% spoke English, 8.6% Spanish, and 1.2% German as their first language.

Of the 11,322 households, 31.6% had children under 18 living with them, 54.8% were married couples living together, 11.4% had a female householder with no husband present, and 29.90% were not families. About 25.7% of all households were made up of individuals, and 12.9% had someone living alone who was 65 or older. The average household size was 2.53 and the average family size was 3.05.

In the county, the age distribution was 24.7% under the age of 18, 11.1% from 18 to 24, 25.3% from 25 to 44, 22.1% from 45 to 64, and 16.9% who were 65 or older. The median age was 37 years. For every 100 females, there were 94.7 males. For every 100 females 18 and over, there were 92.1 males.

The median income for a household in the county was $36,760, and for a family was $43,982. Males had a median income of $31,698 versus $21,346 for females. The per capita income for the county was $17,384. About 9.8% of families and 12.9% of the population were below the poverty line, including 14.8% of those under 18 and 14.5% of those 65 or over.

== Communities ==
=== Cities ===
- Brenham (county seat)
- Burton

=== Unincorporated communities ===
- Berlin
- Chappell Hill
- Greenvine
- Independence
- Latium
- Longpoint
- Mill Creek
- Phillipsburg‡
- Prairie Hill
- Quarry
- Sandy Hill
- Washington-on-the-Brazos
- Wesley
- Whitman
- Wiedeville
- William Penn

=== Historic communities ===
As part of a San Jacinto Day speech in 1900, Hon. Harry Haynes said, "This grand old county, the birthplace and cradle of Texas liberty, is in a sense a vast town cemetery. Tiger Point, Union Hill, Long Point, Sandtown, Old Gay Hill, Mt. Vernon, Turkey Creek, Mt. Gilead, Rock Island, Jacksonville, Mustang, all by the inexorable decrees of new conditions and changes wrought in the course of human events have been blotted from the face of this beautiful earth."

- Ayres
- Cedar Creek – a mile north of Chappell Hill
- Coles Settlement
- Gay Hill
- Goodwill
- Graball
- Mt. Vernon – 2nd county seat, 1841-1843
- Muellersville
- Rock Island
- Tigertown
- Winklemann – single owner tourist town
- Yegua
- Zionville

== Politics ==
Since the 1940s, Washington County has been powerfully Republican, with the only Democratic presidential candidate to carry it since Franklin D. Roosevelt’s 1936 landslide being Hill Country native Lyndon B. Johnson in 1964. Since 1980, no Democrat has gained more than 40 percent of the county’s vote.

United States presidential election results for Washington County, Texas
Year	Republican		Democratic		Third party(ies)	
Year	No.	%	No.	%	No.	%
1912	546	29.43%	1,111	59.89%	198	10.67%
1916	1,306	53.72%	1,119	46.03%	6	0.25%
1920	684	21.24%	796	24.72%	1,740	54.04%
1924	496	11.99%	3,568	86.25%	73	1.76%
1928	275	9.94%	2,491	90.06%	0	0.00%
1932	99	2.79%	3,443	97.12%	3	0.08%
1936	176	8.10%	1,993	91.72%	4	0.18%
1940	1,868	56.32%	1,449	43.68%	0	0.00%
1944	534	13.27%	1,387	34.46%	2,104	52.27%
1948	1,904	50.88%	1,647	44.01%	191	5.10%
1952	3,519	72.17%	1,354	27.77%	3	0.06%
1956	2,975	75.83%	933	23.78%	15	0.38%
1960	2,613	58.21%	1,864	41.52%	12	0.27%
1964	2,019	40.69%	2,938	59.21%	5	0.10%
1968	3,244	57.86%	1,686	30.07%	677	12.07%
1972	3,862	74.30%	1,323	25.45%	13	0.25%
1976	3,820	58.77%	2,635	40.54%	45	0.69%
1980	4,821	64.32%	2,518	33.60%	156	2.08%
1984	6,506	72.32%	2,483	27.60%	7	0.08%
1988	6,041	66.85%	2,960	32.75%	36	0.40%
1992	5,817	53.60%	3,283	30.25%	1,753	16.15%
1996	6,319	60.65%	3,460	33.21%	640	6.14%
2000	8,645	73.21%	2,996	25.37%	168	1.42%
2004	9,597	73.47%	3,389	25.94%	77	0.59%
2008	10,176	70.78%	4,034	28.06%	167	1.16%
2012	10,857	75.41%	3,381	23.48%	159	1.10%
2016	10,945	73.79%	3,382	22.80%	505	3.40%
2020	12,959	74.27%	4,261	24.42%	229	1.31%
2024	14,020	76.96%	4,058	22.28%	139	0.76%

United States Senate election results for Washington County, Texas1
Year	Republican		Democratic		Third party(ies)	
Year	No.	%	No.	%	No.	%
2024	13,586	74.86%	4,240	23.36%	323	1.78%

United States Senate election results for Washington County, Texas2
Year	Republican		Democratic		Third party(ies)	
Year	No.	%	No.	%	No.	%
2020	12,988	75.16%	4,017	23.25%	275	1.59%

Texas Gubernatorial election results for Washington County
Year	Republican		Democratic		Third party(ies)	
Year	No.	%	No.	%	No.	%
2022	10,965	78.48%	2,824	20.21%	183	1.31%

The GOP was competitive in the county during the Third Party System and to a smaller extent during the “System of 1896” era, as the county then had a sizeable freedman population, but the county became typically “Solid South” Democratic for a brief period once that freedman population was completely disfranchised. Following the New Deal, the almost entirely White electorate of Washington County – which was being gradually stripped of its freedman population by the Great Migration – was one of the first to turn against FDR, being one of just 7 Texas counties to vote for Wendell Willkie in 1940. Washington was one of 11 Texas counties to vote in 1920 for American Party candidate James E. Ferguson, and the solitary county to give a majority to the conservative “Texas Regulars”, which were a predecessor to the numerous “Dixiecrat” movements of the following two decades, in the 1944 election.

== Education ==
School districts:

- Brenham Independent School District
- Burton Independent School District District

Blinn College is the designated community college for all of the county. Additionally, Washington County is the sole taxation zone for Blinn College, meaning it is the only place with in-district tuition.

== See also ==
- National Register of Historic Places listings in Washington County, Texas
- Recorded Texas Historic Landmarks in Washington County
