= Brenham Independent School District =

School district in Texas, United States

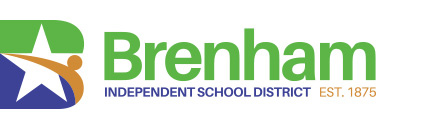

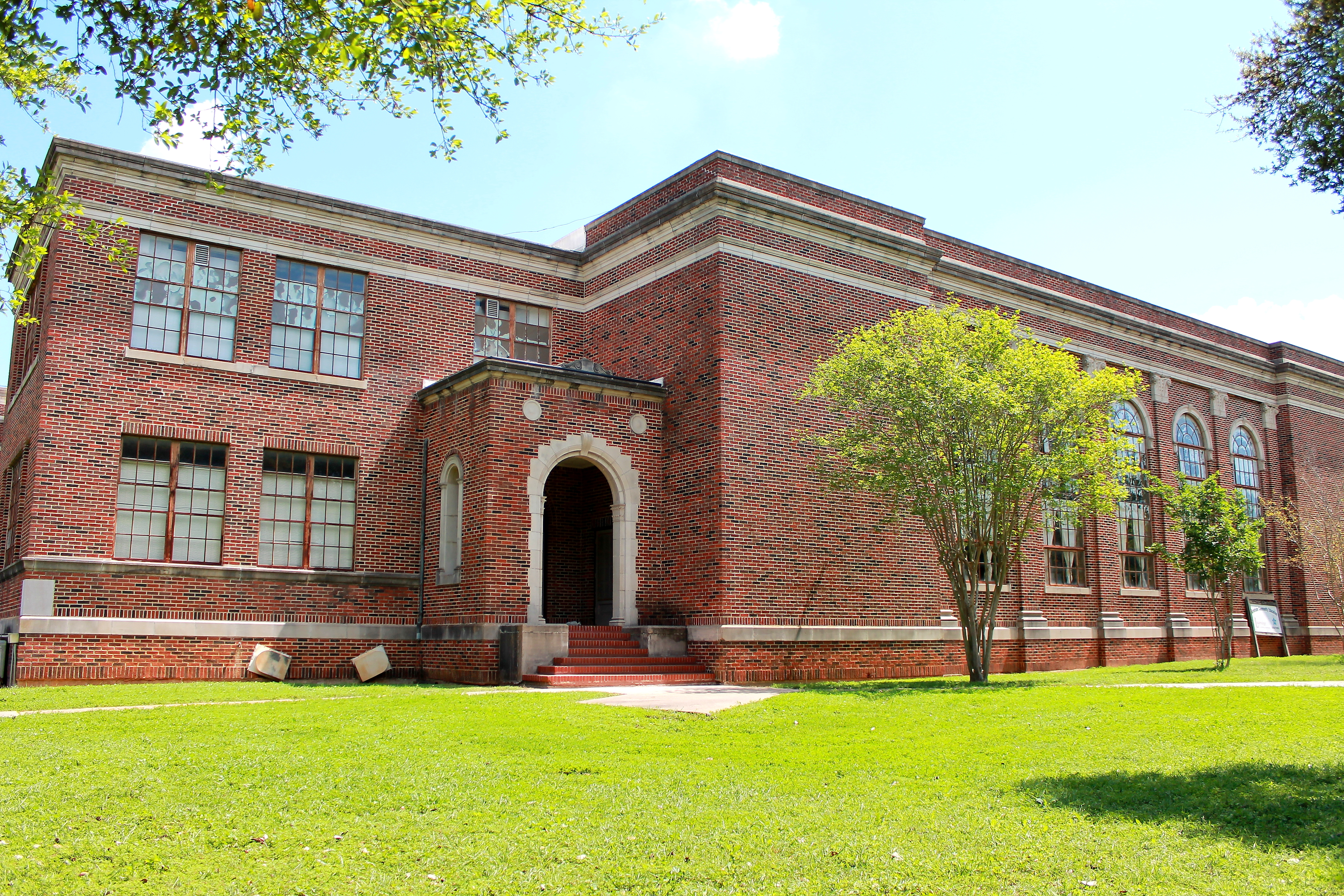
- Old Brenham High School

Address
- 711 E. Mansfield St ESC Region 6 Brenham, Washington County, Texas, 77833; United States
- Coordinates: 30°9′24″N 96°23′18″W

District information
- Type: Independent school district
- Grades: Pre-K through 12
- Superintendent: Clay Gillentine
- Schools: 7
- Budget: $52.3 million total expenditures (2020-2021)
- NCES District ID: 4811280

Students and staff
- Students: 4,865 (2023–2024)
- Teachers: 371.65 (on an FTE basis) (2023–2024)
- Staff: 398.09 (on an FTE basis) (2023–2024)
- Student–teacher ratio: 13.09 (2023–2024)
- Athletic conference: UIL Class 5A Football & Basketball
- District mascot: Cubs
- Colors: Green, White

Other information
- TEA District Accountability Rating for 2011-12: Academically Acceptable
- Website: www.brenhamisd.net

Brenham Independent School District is a public school district based in Brenham, Texas, US. While mostly located in Washington County, a very small portion of the district extends into Austin County. The district serves the City of Brenham and the Washington community in Washington County. The district operates one high school, Brenham High School.

== Finances ==
The district's approved budget for 2020-2021 estimates general fund revenue at $47.8 million, interest and sinking revenue at $2.49 million, and child nutrition revenue at $2 million. This budget also estimates general fund expenditures at $47.8 million, interest and sinking expenditures at $2.74 million, and child nutrition expenditures at $2.13 million.

The district is funded largely through local property taxes and the state budget. In the 2020-2021 school year, the maintenance and operations (M&O) tax rate was 0.9658% (funding the general fund), and the interest and sinking (I&S) rate was 0.08% (funding the interest and sinking fund). These taxes brought in $29.8 million and $2.43 million in revenue respectively, the rest of the revenue coming from a combination of local, state, and federal funding.

Approximately 78% of the district's general fund expenditures ($37.1 million of $47.8 million) were for payroll.

== Academic achievement ==
In 2011, the school district was rated "academically acceptable" by the Texas Education Agency. About 49% of districts in Texas in 2011 received the same rating. No state accountability ratings will be given to districts in 2012. A school district in Texas can receive one of four possible rankings from the Texas Education Agency: Exemplary (the highest possible ranking), Recognized, Academically Acceptable, and Academically Unacceptable (the lowest possible ranking).

Historical district TEA accountability ratings

- 2011: Academically Acceptable
- 2010: Academically Acceptable
- 2009: Academically Unacceptable
- 2008: Academically Acceptable
- 2007: Academically Acceptable
- 2006: Academically Acceptable
- 2005: Academically Acceptable
- 2004: Academically Acceptable

== Schools ==
In the 2011-2012 school year, the district operated seven schools.

=== Regular instructional ===
==== Brenham High School (Grades 9-12) ====
The principal in the 2011-2012 school year was Steve Skrla. In 2011, the school was rated "academically acceptable" by the Texas Education Agency. Thirty-four percent of schools in Texas in 2011 received the same rating. The school was the first accredited high school in the state of Texas.

Brenham High is the home of the Brenham Cub Band. The band has been a 4A Honor Band Finalist and 4A State Marching Finalist. Brenham High School has a Marine Corps JROTC program which has won numerous awards for drill, shooting team, and color guard. Brenham High School is also the home of the Brenham High School Chorale Choir. The choir has been a mixed choir consisting of at least 20 students and five students to each voice part. In 2008, the choir received all ones at the UIL Concert and Sight-reading Competition. Brenham High School is also the home of the Brenham High School Drama Department.

==== Brenham Junior High School (Grades 7-8) ====
The principal in the 2011-2012 school year was Paul Aschenbeck. In 2011, the school was rated "academically unacceptable" by the Texas Education Agency. Six percent of schools in Texas in 2011 received the same rating. Originally built as a bomb shelter during the Cold War, the school is two stories high with one underground.

==== Brenham Middle School (Grades 5-6) ====
The principal in the 2011-2012 school year was Peggy Still. In 2011, the school was rated "academically acceptable" by the Texas Education Agency. Thirty-four percent of schools in Texas in 2011 received the same rating. In 2005, the school was named as a National Blue Ribbon School.

==== Elementary Schools (Grades PK-4) ====
- Alton Elementary
- Brenham Elementary
- Krause Elementary

=== Alternative instructional ===
- Brenham Alternative (Grades 5 through 12)

== See also ==
- List of school districts in Texas
- List of high schools in Texas
