= List of ghost towns in Texas =

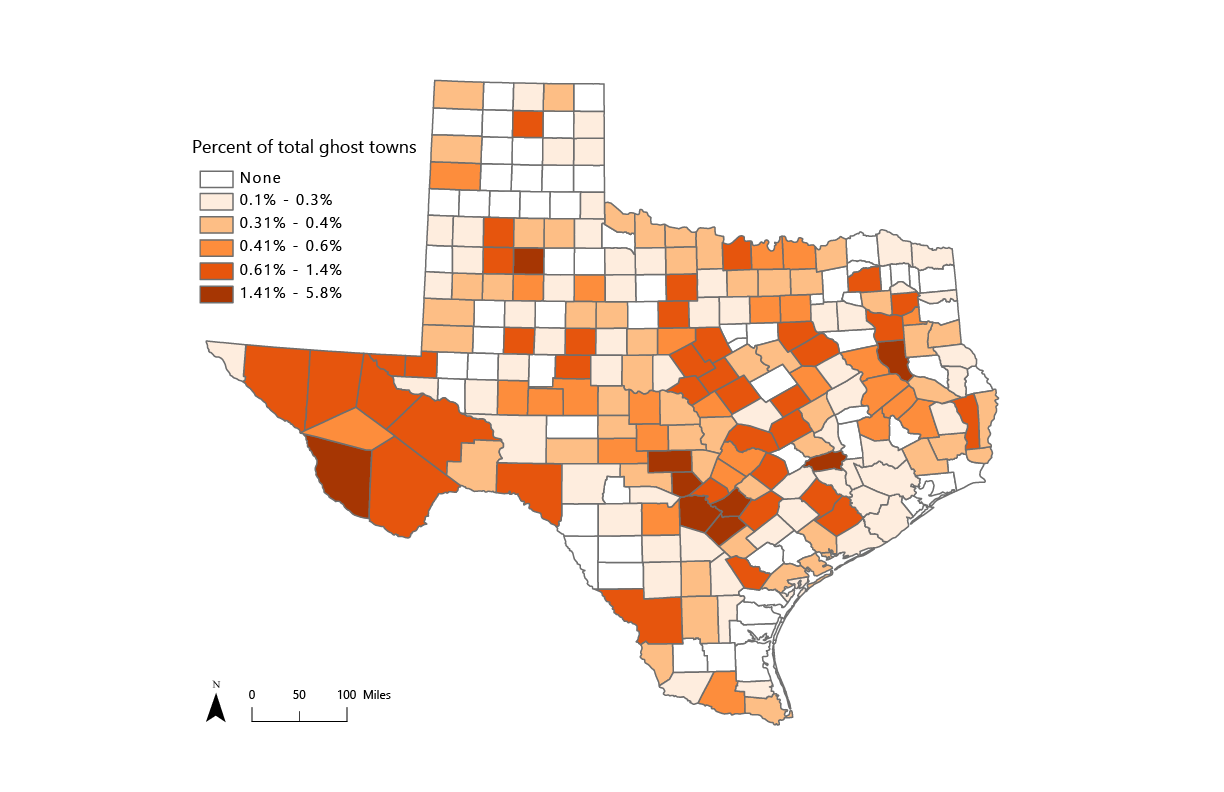
Choropleth map of percentage of ghost towns per county in Texas.

This is an incomplete list of ghost towns in Texas.

== Classification ==
Barren site

- Sites no longer in existence
- Sites that have been destroyed
- Submerged
- Reverted to pasture
- May have a few difficult-to-find foundations/footings at most

Neglected site

- Only rubble left
- All buildings uninhabited
- Roofless building ruins
- Some buildings or houses still standing

Abandoned site

- Buildings or houses still standing
- Buildings and houses all abandoned
- No population, except caretaker
- Site no longer in existence except for one or two buildings (for example old church, grocery store)

Semiabandoned site

- Building or houses still standing
- Buildings and houses largely abandoned
- Fewer than 50 residents (small population)
- Many abandoned buildings

Historic community

- Building or houses still standing
- Still a busy community
- Smaller than its boom years
- Population has decreased dramatically, to one-fifth or less
- May now be a census-designated place
- May have been "absorbed" by extant entity

== List ==
Name	Other names	County	Settled	Abandoned	Current status	Notes/references
Acala		Hudspeth	Before 1925		Semi-abandoned	Population high-mark of 100
Acme		Hardeman	1898		Semi-abandoned	Georgia-Pacific Gypsum plant is still in operation at townsite
Adobe Walls		Hutchinson	1843		Barren site	See also First Battle of Adobe Walls, Second Battle of Adobe Walls
Adobes		Presidio	1870s		Neglected site	Only scattered ruins and the cemetery remain.
Albert	Martinsburg	Gillespie	1877		Semi-abandoned	Location of historic Albert Dance Hall.
Albuquerque		Gonzales/Wilson	1857		Barren site	Later survey found it to be in Gonzales County, not Wilson as believed at founding.
Aldridge		Jasper	1890s		Barren site	Logging town hampered by several mill fires, bypassed by railroad
Alexander		Erath	1876		Historic community	Population high mark was 381; approximately 40 remain as of 2000.
Allamoore	Allamore, Carrizo	Hudspeth	1888		Semi-abandoned	
Alton	Pinckneyville	Denton	1848	1856	Semi-abandoned	Original Denton County seat; currently remains a ghost town with only the infamous Old Alton Bridge and the cemetery being left.
Alum		Wilson	Before 1900		Semi abandoned	Little recorded history, once had a general store and small school.
Ammans Crossing		Kendall				Little information found.
Anarene		Archer	1908	1950s	Barren site	Zero tangible remains
Aransas City		Aransas	1837	1847	Barren site	Original Refugio County seat
Arden		Irion	1885		Semi-abandoned	One homestead and cemetery are only remains
Arno		Reeves	1907	1915	Barren site	Population high mark of 100 residents.
Arispe	La Valley	Hudspeth	1885	1940s	Abandoned	Population high mark of 57
Auburn		Ellis	1850's		Semi-abandoned	Only scattered residences and cemetery remain
Audra		Taylor	Before 1900	1910s	Barren site	Bypassed by railroad and supplanted by nearby Bradshaw
Audubon		Wise	1865	1900s	Barren site	Very little information found; bypassed by railroad
Ayr		Deaf Smith	1890	1895	Barren site	Supplanted by La Plata as county seat and abandoned
Ayres		Washington	1835		Barren site	One of Stephen F. Austin's original colonies.
Bankersmith		Kendall	1913	By 1980	Barren site	No longer exists
Bartonsite	Barton Ranch	Hale	1907	1921	Barren site	Most of town's structures were relocated to Abernathy.
Becton		Lubbock	1917		Semi-abandoned	Current population of 125
Belcherville		Montague	1858		Semi-abandoned	Current population estimated at 35
Belknap		Young	1851		Historic community	See Fort Belknap
Belle Plain		Callahan	1876	1909	Neglected site	Original Callahan County seat. Ruins of Belle Plain college and cemetery only remnants
Belzora		Smith	1850	1930s	Abandoned site	Once a prominent inland port, now abandoned
Ben Ficklin	Benficklin	Tom Green	1873	1882	Barren site	Original Tom Green county seat, destroyed by catastrophic flood
Benina	Ashton, Boren's Mills	San Augustine	1871	1940s	Barren site	No longer exists
Benton		Kendall			Barren site	Little information found
Benton City	Benton	Atascosa	1876	1956	Historic community	Absorbed by Lytle
Best		Reagan	1924		Abandoned site	Oil boomtown, once home to 3,500 residents
Bettina		Llano	1847		Barren site	Commune started by German freethinkers
Bexar	La Colorada, La Mina de la Colorada	Bexar	1854		Semi-abandoned	Bypassed by railroad
Birchville	Smith Ranch	Hudspeth			Barren site	No longer exists
Birdville		Tarrant	1841		Historic community	Absorbed by Haltom City
Bitter Creek		Nolan	1880s		Barren site	Near present-day Sweetwater
Block Creek		Kendall	1884	1940s	Barren site	Commune started by German freethinkers
Blumenthal		Gillespie	ca. 1900		Semi-abandoned site	
Boise		Oldham			Abandoned site	Railroad town, very little information found
Boldtville		Wilson				
Bomarton		Baylor				
Boonville		Brazos				
Boracho		Culberson				
Boz		Ellis				
Bradshaw		Taylor	1909	1990s	Semi-abandoned	Population high-mark was 450, 61 remained as of 2000
Bragg	Bragg Station	Hardin				
Brazos Point		Bosque				
Britton		Ellis				
Bronco		Yoakum				
Browning		Smith				
Bryant Station		Milam				
Bucksnort	Sarahville De Viesca, Fort Milam	Falls	1834			
Burning Bush Colony		Smith/Cherokee				Redirects to Metropolitan Church Association. Burning Bush Colony was a Methodist settlement.
Caddo		Milam				
Caddo		Wilson				
Cain City		Gillespie	1915			No longer exists
Calaveras		Wilson				
Calf Creek		McCulloch			Abandoned site	
Callahan City		Callahan				
Calliham		McMullen				
Camey Spur		Denton	1852			
Camp Verde		Kerr				
Cañada Verde		Wilson				
Candelaria		Presidio				
Candlish		Bee				
Canyon City		Comal	1960s		Barren, submerged	Submerged by impoundment of Canyon Lake in 1964
Canyon Valley		Crosby				
Cap Rock		Crosby				
Caput		Gaines				
Carlton		Hamilton			Semi-abandoned site	
Carpenter		Wilson				
Carta Valley		Edwards				
Carter		Parker				
Casa Blanca		Jim Wells				
Casa Piedra		Presidio				
Castolon	La Harmonia Ranch, Campo Santa Helena	Brewster				
Cedar Creek		Washington				
Cedar Station		Terrell				
Center Point		Camp	1865			
Center Point		Hays				
Center Point		Hopkins				
Center Point		Kerr				
Center Point		Panola				
Center Point		Trinity				
Center Point		Upshur				
Chalk Mountain		Erath			Abandoned site	
Cheapside		Gonzales				
Cheyenne		Winkler				
Chinati		Presidio				
Chinese Coal Mine		Jeff Davis				
Chispa		Jeff Davis				
Cibolo Settlement		Comal			No longer exists	
Cincinnati		Walker				
Clairemont		Kent	1892	1950's	Semi-abandoned site	Original Kent County Seat
Clairette		Erath				
Clara		Wichita				
Clareville		Bee				
Click		Llano				
Clinton		DeWitt				
Clifden	Gallagher's Ranch	Medina				
Close City		Garza			No longer exists	
County Line		Lubbock/Hale				
Coffeeville		Upshur				
Coke		Wood				
Coker		Bexar				
Cold Springs		Uvalde				
Coles Settlement		Washington				
College Mound		Kaufman			Barren site	
Coltharp		Houston				
Comyn		Comanche				
Concrete		Guadalupe				
Copano		Refugio				Named for the Copane Indians.
Cora		Comanche	1857		Barren site	Original Comanche County seat.
Corn Hill		Williamson			Semi-abandoned site	
Cottage Hill		Bexar				
Cowden Place		Winkler				
Crestonio		Duval				
Crisp		Ellis				
Cryer Creek		Navarro				
Currey's Creek	Curry Creek Settlement	Kendall	1850			
Curry		Stephens			Barren: Submerged	Submerged by impoundment of the Hubbard Creek Reservoir
Cuthbert		Mitchell	1890			
Dalby Springs		Bowie				
Danville		Gregg				Historic community, absorbed by Kilgore.
Darilek		Wilson				
Darwin		Webb				No longer exists.
Decker	Decker Prairie; Decker's Prairie	Nolan				
Deland		Erath				
Denhawken		Wilson				
Desdemona		Eastland	1877		Historic Community	
Dewees		Wilson				
Dias E Ocho Creek Camp		Presidio				
Dido		Tarrant	1848		Abandoned	Still contains a few residents that are working on restoring the town.
Dietz		Guadalupe				
Dillon		Hopkins				
Dixie		Grayson				
Doan's Crossing	Doans	Wilbarger	1878			Started in 1878 as a cattle-drive trading post by Jonathan Doan and his nephew Corwin Doan. Quanah Parker traded here.
Dodge City		Williamson				
Dolores		Webb				
Dolores Viejo		Zapata				
Dolores Nuevo	Nueva Dolores	Zapata				
Doseido Colony		Wilson				
Doole	Gansel	Concho	1911			Renamed at the request of the United States Postal Service.
Drop	Dewdrop	Denton	1854	1910	Semi-abandoned	Still one or two residents in the area.
Drumright		Glasscock				
Dryden		Terrell				
Duffau		Erath				
Dull		La Salle				
Dumas		Wood				
Dye Mound	Dye	Montague				Neither the Texas Almanac nor the Handbook of Texas classify this a ghost town. Year 2000 population was 2000.
Eagle Creek		Wilson				
Eagle's Nest		Val Verde				
Ebony		Mills				
Eckert		Gillespie				
Egypt		Leon				
Eliasville		Young			Semi-abandoned site	
Elizabethtown	Bugtown	Denton	1850	1880	Barren site	Elizabethtown is now just a muddy field open for lease, about 2 miles from the Texas Motor Speedway. The only remnant is the cemetery.
Elm Creek		Guadalupe				
Emerald		Crockett				
Emma		Crosby				Original Crosby County seat.
Enon		Houston				
Enon		Upshur				
Epworth		Hale				Merged with Hale City to form Hale Center
Esperanza		Montgomery				
Estacado		Crosby/Lubbock				No longer exists.
Etholen		Hudspeth				
Etna		Cherokee				
Fairview		Wilson				Neither the Texas Almanac nor the Handbook of Texas classify this a ghost town. Year 2000 population was 95.
Farewell		Dallam				
Farmer		Young				
Fasken		Andrews				
Fastrill		Cherokee				
Flora		Smith				
Fort Belknap		Young				
Fort Griffin		Shackelford				
Fort Holland		Presidio				
Fort Hudson		Val Verde				
Fort Martin Scott		Gillespie				
Fort McKavett	Scabtown, Lehnesburg	Menard	1850s	1900s	Historic community	Now a state historic site
Fort Oldham		Burleson				
Fort Phantom Hill		Jones				
Fort Quitman		Hudspeth				
Fort Terrett		Sutton				
Frio Town	Frio City	Frio				Original Frio County seat.
Frosa		Limestone				
Fry		Brown				
Fuqua		Liberty				
Gander Slu		Guadalupe				
Gay Hill		Washington				
Ghent		Cherokee				
Gilliland		Knox				Neither the Texas Almanac nor the Handbook of Texas classify this a ghost town. Year 2000 population was 10.
Girvin		Pecos				
Glenrio		Deaf Smith				Neither the Texas Almanac nor the Handbook of Texas classify this a ghost town. Year 2000 population was 10.
Goforth		Hays				
Gold, Texas		Gillespie				Rheingold School is an NRHP listing. Founded in 1869 by the families of two German brothers, Jacob and Peter Gold, who owned most of the land. It was unofficially known as Rheingold
Golden Pond, Texas		Stonewall				
Gomez, Texas	Old Gomez	Terry				
Goodwill		Washington				
Gorbit	Gorbett, Torbit	Dallas	1889	1904	Historic Community	Absorbed by Irving
Goshen		Walker				
Graball		Washington				
Granville		Angelina				
Grapetown		Gillespie				
Grass Pond Colony		Wilson				
Grassyville		Bastrop			Abandoned site	
Gray Mule		Floyd				
Graytown		Wilson				Handbook of Texas refers to this as a "dispersed rural community".
Green Valley		Denton			Semi-abandoned site	Still has a population of around 10-15 people.
Grice		Upshur				Handbook of Texas refers to this as a "dispersed rural community".
Grit		Mason				
Gruene		Comal				Historic community; absorbed by New Braunfels.
Guadalupe City		Guadalupe				Absorbed by Seguin
Gulf	Old Gulf; Gulf Hill; Big Hill	Matagorda				
Gunsight		Stephens				
Hackberry		Lavaca				
Hagerman		Grayson			Barren: Submerged	Submerged by the Lake Texoma impoundment in 1944
Hale City		Hale				Merged with Epworth to form Hale Center.
Handley		Tarrant	1876	1946	Historic community	Absorbed by Fort Worth
Hart Camp	Harts Camp	Lamb				
Haslam		Shelby				Neither the Texas Almanac nor the Handbook of Texas classify this a ghost town.
Hay Flat		Loving/Winkler				
Hayrick		Coke				
Heckville		Lubbock				
Hedwigs Hill, Texas		Mason				Handbook of Texas refers to this as a "dispersed rural community".
Helena		Karnes	1852			Original Karnes County seat.
Helmic		Trinity				Handbook of Texas refers to this as a "dispersed rural community".
Henry's Chapel		Cherokee				Handbook of Texas refers to this as a "dispersed rural community".
Hickory Flats		Bastrop				
Hilda		Mason				
Holt		San Saba				
Honey Creek		Comal				
Hot Springs		Brewster				
Huff		Archer				
Hughes		Irion				
Huron		Hill				
Ilka		Guadalupe				
Illinois Bend		Montague				Neither the Texas Almanac nor the Handbook of Texas classify this a ghost town.
Indianola		Calhoun			Barren site, submerged	Submerged under Matagorda Bay.
Indio		Starr/Presidio				
Ireland		Coryell/Hamilton				Neither the Texas Almanac nor the Handbook of Texas classify this a ghost town. Year 2000 population was 60.
Iron Bridge		Gregg				
Islitas		Webb				
Israel		Freestone				
Izoro		Lampasas				
Jakes Colony		Guadalupe				Neither the Texas Almanac nor the Handbook of Texas classify this a ghost town. Year 2000 population was 95.
Jarvis		Anderson				
Jean		Young				Neither the Texas Almanac nor the Handbook of Texas classify this a ghost town. Year 2000 population was 110.
Jermyn		Jack				Neither the Texas Almanac nor the Handbook of Texas classify this a ghost town. Year 2000 population was 75.
Jewel		Eastland				
Jim Town		Dallas				
Jimkurn		Stephens				
Joinerville		Rusk				
Jonesboro		Coryell/Hamilton				Neither the Texas Almanac nor the Handbook of Texas classify this a ghost town. Year 2000 population was 125.
Jud		Haskell				
Juniper		Coke				
Juno		Val Verde				
Justiceburg		Garza				Neither the Texas Almanac nor the Handbook of Texas classify this a ghost town. Year 2000 population was 12.
Kellyville		Marion				Neither the Texas Almanac nor the Handbook of Texas classify this a ghost town. Community tied to the tourist trade from Caddo Lake State Park. Year 2000 population of 75.
Kelm		Navarro				
Kelsey		Upshur				
Kelso		Deaf Smith				The town that never was. Land sales scheme created by George G. Wright, who constructed a fake city on the property. That, and other Kelso schemes by Wright, failed.
Kent		Culberson				
Kicaster		Wilson			Semi-abandoned	Neither the Texas Almanac nor the Handbook of Texas classify this a ghost town. Year 2000 population was 100.
Kimball		Bosque				
Kingsmill	Kings Mill	Gray				
Kirk		Bexar				
Kirkland		Childress				
Kittie	Kittie West	Live Oak				
Kittrell		Walker				
Knight		Polk				
Knoxville		Cherokee				
La Casa		Stephens				
La Lomita		Hidalgo				Listed on 1975 National Register of Historic Places
La Plata		Presidio				
La Reunion		Dallas			Barren	Absorbed by Dallas. The only confirmed remnant is the cemetery.
Lajitas		Brewster			Historic community	
Langtry		Val Verde			Abandoned site	
Larissa		Cherokee			Semi-abandoned site	
Las Cabras		Wilson				
Las Islas		Wilson				
Laurelia		Polk				
League Four		Crosby				
Leesville		Gonzales				
Lemonville		Orange				
Levita		Coryell				Neither the Texas Almanac nor the Handbook of Texas classify this a ghost town. Year 2000 population was 70.
Linnville, Brazoria County, Texas		Brazoria				
Linnville, Calhoun County, Texas		Calhoun				
Lobo		Culberson			Abandoned site	
Locker		San Saba				
Lodi		Wilson				
Loire		Wilson				
Loma Vista		Wilson				
Lone Oak		Bexar			Historic community	Appears to have been absorbed by San Antonio.
Longfellow		Pecos				Railroad station, not a town.
Longhorn		Bexar			Absorbed	Company town (from Longhorn Cement Company) abandoned and eventually absorbed by San Antonio.
Lookout Valley		Bexar				Unknown where or what this is
Los Ojuelos		Webb				
Louetta		Harris				
Lowell		Erath				The only mention of Lowell in Erath County is that's it's near Armstrong Creek.
Lozier		Pecos				
Luckenbach		Gillespie			Semi-abandoned site	
Luxello		Bexar				
Lyra		Palo Pinto				
Lytton Springs		Caldwell				
Macksville		Comanche				
Madera Springs		Jeff Davis				
Magwalt		Winkler				No information found on this one
Manda		Travis				
Manestee		Tom Green				
Mangum		Eastland				
Manning		Angelina				
Mantua		Collin				
Marcelina		Wilson				
Marysville		Cooke				Neither the Texas Almanac nor the Handbook of Texas classify this a ghost town. Year 2000 population was 12.
Maxdale		Bell				
McDuff		Bastrop				
McGirk		Hamilton				
McNeil		Williamson			Historic community	Absorbed by Austin.
Medicine Mound		Hardeman				
Mendota		Hemphill				
Mentone		Loving			Historic community	Least populated seat of least populated county in Texas
Merle		Burleson				
Merrilltown		Travis			Historic community	Absorbed by Austin.
Mesquite		Borden			Abandoned site	
Mill Creek		Guadalupe				
Millville		Rusk				Formerly known as Chickenfeather Road
Mineral Springs		Panola				
Minters Chapel		Tarrant				
Mobeetie	Hide Town; Hidetown	Wheeler				
Monte Christo		Hidalgo				
Monthalia		Gonzales				Neither the Texas Almanac nor the Handbook of Texas classify this a ghost town. Year 2000 population was 65.
Morales		Jackson				
Mormon Mill		Burnet				
Morrill		Cherokee				
Morris Ranch		Gillespie				
Mount Blanco		Crosby				This link currently redirects Mount Blanco.
Mount Olive		Mills				
Muellersville		Washington				
Mustang Prairie		Falls				
Narcisso		Cottle				
Neighborsville		Comal				
Neuse Store		Comal				
New Birmingham		Cherokee				
New Danville		Gregg			Historic community	Absorbed by Kilgore.
New Fountain		Medina				
New Gulf	Newgulf	Wharton				
New Lynn		Lynn				
New Sweden		Travis				
Newport		Clay				Neither the Texas Almanac nor the Handbook of Texas classify this a ghost town.
Nix		Lampasas				Neither the Texas Almanac nor the Handbook of Texas classify this a ghost town. Year 2000 population was 14.
Nockenut		Wilson				
Nogal		Ochiltree				
Norfleet		Hale				
North Roby		Fisher			Barren site	
Nottawa		Wharton				
Noxville		Kimble				Neither the Texas Almanac nor the Handbook of Texas classify this a ghost town. Year 2000 population was 6.
O'Daniel		Guadalupe				Named for schoolteacher John N. O'Daniel
Oak Forest		Gonzales				
Oak Hill		Bastrop				
Oak Hill	Live Oak Springs, Live Oak, Oatmanville	Travis	1870	1990s	Historic community	Absorbed by Austin
Oakland		Colorado				
Ochiltree		Ochiltree				Named for William Beck Ochiltree
Ochoa		Presidio				
Odds		Limestone/Falls				
Ohio		Hamilton				
Ojo de Veranda		Presidio				
Olga		Nolan				
Olive	Sunset	Hardin				
Olmos		Guadalupe				
Opdyke namesake of Opdyke West		Hockley			Abandoned site	
Orient		Tom Green				
Orla		Reeves			Historic community	Neither the Texas Almanac nor the Handbook of Texas classify this a ghost town. Year 2000 population was 183.
Orlena		Cooke			Submerged	Possibly submerged with the creation of Lake Texoma
Osage		Colorado				
Oso		Fayette				
Otis Chalk		Howard	1926			Named for the rancher whose oil-rich land triggered a 1926 local oil boom.
Otto		Falls				
Owens		Crosby				Named for Tom B. Owens, who built the schoolhouse.
Owensville		Robertson				
Owenville		Sutton				
Pandora		Wilson				
Padgett		Young				
Palm Valley		Williamson			Historic community	Absorbed by Round Rock.
Pandale		Val Verde				
Parita		Bexar				Named for Parita Creek
Park Springs		Wise				
Parris		Collin				
Paso Real		Cameron/Willacy				
Peach Creek		Wharton				
Peach Tree Village		Tyler				
Pear Valley		McCulloch			Semi-abandoned	Neither the Texas Almanac nor the Handbook of Texas classify this a ghost town. Year 2000 population was 37.
Pedernales		Gillespie				
Penick		Jones				
Perico		Dallam				
Pescadito		Webb				
Peyton Colony		Blanco				
Phelan		Bastrop				
Phillips		Hutchinson		1936		One-time home of Phillips Petroleum Company, founded on land owned by James A. Whittenburg. The town ceased to exist after the 1936 death of Whittenburg.
Pila Blanca		Duval				
Pilares		Presidio				
Pine Springs		Culberson				
Pisek		Colorado				
Pisgah		Navarro				
Pittsville		Fort Bend				
Plata		Presidio				
Pleasant Hill		Houston				Only the town cemetery remains.
Plemons		Hutchinson				Only the town cemetery remains.
Plummer Crossing		Wilson				
Poesta	Hatchers	Bee				Originally named "Hatchers", but renamed for nearby Poesta Creek.
Polonia		Caldwell				
Pontotoc		Mason				
Port Sullivan		Milam				
Porterville		Loving				
Porvenir		Presidio				See also Porvenir massacre (1918)
Praha		Newton				
Preston		Wharton				
Princeton		Newton			Abandoned	Abandoned in the early 20th century.
Pringle		Hutchinson				
Proffitt		Young				Named for the John Proffitt ranching family.
Provident City		Colorado	1909	1930s		Began as a land promotion in 1909. Mostly abandoned during the Great Depression in the United States.
Pumpville		Val Verde				Neither the Texas Almanac nor the Handbook of Texas classify this a ghost town.
Pyote		Ward				
Quigley		Jasper				
Quincy		Bee				Originally known as the John Quincy Ranch.
Rath City		Stonewall				
Rayner		Stonewall				Original Stonewall County seat.
Redbarn		Pecos				Yates Oil Field is here. The town was named for the barn Ira and Ann Yates had on their property. Iraan, Texas is a combination of their names.
Red River Station		Montague				
Regency		Mills				
Remlig		Jasper				
Rexville		Austin				No longer exists.
Ridout		Wilson				Obscure, very little info found.
Rock Island		Washington/Waller				No longer exists.
Roosevelt		Kimble				Named for President Theodore Roosevelt, who allegedly visited the area with the Rough Riders. Founded by W. B. Wagoner.
Rooster Springs		Hays				No longer exists.
Ross City		Howard				No longer exists, per Texas Almanac.
Royston, Texas		Fisher				
Runnels City		Runnels				No longer exists.
Rustler Springs		Culberson				Texas Almanac says this town no longer exists.
St. Mary's of Aransas		Refugio				
Sage		Burnet				
Salona		Montague				
Salt Flat		Hudspeth				
Salt Gap		McCullouch				
Sam Fordyce		Hidalgo				
Saspamco		Wilson				
San Vicente		Brewster				
Sanco		Coke				
Sandy Hills		Wilson				No longer exists.
Santa Rita		Cameron				No longer exists.
Santo Tomás		Webb				No longer exists.
Sarahville de Viesca	Bucksnort	Falls				No longer exists.
Savage		Crosby				
Savage		Fannin				
Senterfitt		Lampasas				No longer exists.
Shafter		Presidio				
Shafter Lake		Andrews				No longer exists.
Shannon		Clay				
Sher-Han		Hansford				No longer exists.
Sherwood		Irion				Original Irion County seat.
Signal Hill		Hutchinson				No longer exists.
Silver		Coke				Not classified as a ghost town, and there are active businesses here.
Sipe Springs		Comanche				No longer exists.
Sipe Springs		Milam				No longer exists.
Sivells Bend		Cooke				
Slide		Lubbock				
Smeltertown		El Paso				No longer exists.
Smithfield		Tarrant		1958	Absorbed	Annexed by North Richland Hills in 1958.
Soash		Howard				No longer exists.
Sowers		Dallas			Historic community	No longer exists, absorbed by Irving.
Spanish Fort		Montague			Neglected	Year 2000 Spanish Fort population was 50, but all structures are abandoned.
Spurlin		Hamilton				No longer exists.
Starrville		Smith				
Sterley		Floyd				10 persons living here in 1990.
Sterling		Robertson				No longer exists.
Steward's Mill		Freestone				Population of 22 in 2000 census.
Stiles		Reagan	Before 1877			Original Reagan County seat. Neither the Texas Almanac nor the Handbook of Texas classify this a ghost town. Established by former slaves prior to 1877. Population of four persons in 2000.
Sullivan		Guadalupe				No longer exists.
Sumpter		Trinity				No longer exists. Once the home of outlaw John Wesley Hardin
Sunnyside		Menard				No longer exists.
Sunshine Hill		Wichita				No longer exists.
Sutherland Springs		Wilson				
Swartwout		Polk				Sam Houston was a shareholder in this town.
Swastika		Hale				Removed from all maps after the WWII rise of Nazi Germany. No evidence exists that this was an actual community, but might have been a train switch stop.
Sweden		Duval				
Sweet Home		Guadalupe	Before 1877			Neither the Texas Almanac nor the Handbook of Texas classify this a ghost town. Established by former slaves prior to 1877. Population of 80 persons in the year-2000 census.
Sycamore		Guadalupe				No longer exists.
Tarrant		Hopkins				No longer exists.
Tascosa		Oldham				Cal Farley's Boys Ranch built on this land in 1939.
Tee Pee City		Motley				No longer exists.
Tehuacana		Limestone			Historic community	
Telegraph		Kimble				Neither the Texas Almanac nor the Handbook of Texas classify this a ghost town.
Telico		Ellis				
Tennyson		Coke				
Terlingua		Brewster				Former ghost town that came back to life with its annual chili cook-off. 2000 population was 267.
Texana		Jackson				No longer exists, but was significant during the 1835–36 Texas Revolution.
Texla		Orange				No longer exists.
Texon		Reagan				No longer exists.
The Grove		Coryell				
Three Oaks		Wilson				Neither the Texas Almanac nor the Handbook of Texas classify this a ghost town, with a year-2000 population of 150 residents.
Thurber		Erath	1888	ca. 1937	Semi-abandoned site	Company town (Texas and Pacific Oil and Coal Company); at its peak was most populous city between Fort Worth and El Paso.
Tiemann		Guadalupe				No longer exists.
Tigertown		Washington				
Tip Top		Rusk				
Toadsuck	Toadsuck Saloon	Grayson				No longer exists. Originally called Toadsuck Saloon. In the vernacular of its era, a "suck" sometimes referred to a whirlpool.
Tokio		Terry				
Tolbert		Wilbarger				Neither the Texas Almanac nor the Handbook of Texas classify this a ghost town.
Toyah		Reeves			Semi-abandoned site	
Toyahvale		Reeves				
Towash		Hill				No longer exists.
Trickham		Coleman			Semi-abandoned	Neither the Texas Almanac nor the Handbook of Texas classify this a ghost town, with a year-2000 population of 12 residents. The peak population was 150 in year 1892.
Tucker		Anderson				
Tuckertown		Navarro				No longer exists.
Tuff		Bandera				No longer exists.
Tuleta		Bee				
Turpentine		Jasper				No longer exists.
Twin Sisters		Blanco				
Union Valley		Wilson				Neither the Texas Almanac nor the Handbook of Texas classify this a ghost town, with a year-2000 population of 52 residents.
Unity		Wilson				No longer exists.
Upland		Upton				No longer exists.
Upton		Bastrop				
Utica		Smith				No longer exists.
Vandenburg		Medina				No longer exists.
Viboras		Starr County				
Verbena		Garza				No longer exists.
Vesrue		Winkler				No longer exists.
Vieja Springs		Presidio				
Virginia City		Bailey				No longer exists.
Waring		Kendall				
Warren		Fannin				No longer exists.
Wasp Creek		Kendall				
Wastella		Nolan				Neither the Texas Almanac nor the Handbook of Texas classify this a ghost town. Small population, but not a ghost town.
Watson		Red River/Comanche		1936		Nonexistent as of 1936.
Watkins		Terrell				No longer exists.
Watkins		Van Zandt				No longer exists.
Wayside		Lynn				No longer exists.
Welfare		Kendall			Semi-abandoned	Neither the Texas Almanac nor the Handbook of Texas classify this a ghost town. Small population, but not a ghost town.
Wenasco		Jasper				No longer exists
White City		Gaines				No longer exists.
Whiteway		Hamilton			Semi-abandoned	Neither the Texas Almanac nor the Handbook of Texas classify this a ghost town. Small population, but not a ghost town.
Whiteflat		Motley			Semi-abandoned	Neither the Texas Almanac nor the Handbook of Texas classify this a ghost town. Small population, but not a ghost town.
Whittenburg		Hutchinson				No longer exists, merged with Phillips, Texas, now also a ghost town.
Who'd Thought It		Hopkins				No longer exists.
Whon		Coleman			Semi-abandoned	Neither the Texas Almanac nor the Handbook of Texas classify this a ghost town. Small population, but not a ghost town.
Wild Cat Bluff		Anderson				No longer exists.
Williams Ranch		Mills				No longer exists.
Winkelmann		Washington	1983	1989		Created in 1983 by developer Ray Winkelmann, as a type of tourist attraction village. He had 93 employees and ran tours through the town. He auctioned the town off in 1989.
Wintergreen		Karnes				No longer exists.
Woodward		LaSalle			Semi-abandoned	Neither the Texas Almanac nor the Handbook of Texas classify this a ghost town. Small population, but not a ghost town.
Woody		Loving				No longer exists.
Yegua		Washington				No longer exists.
Zeirath		Jasper				No longer exists.
Zella		McMullen				No longer exists.
Ziler		Howard				No longer exists.
Zionville		Washington				
Zorn		Guadalupe				
Zuehl		Guadalupe				

== Images ==
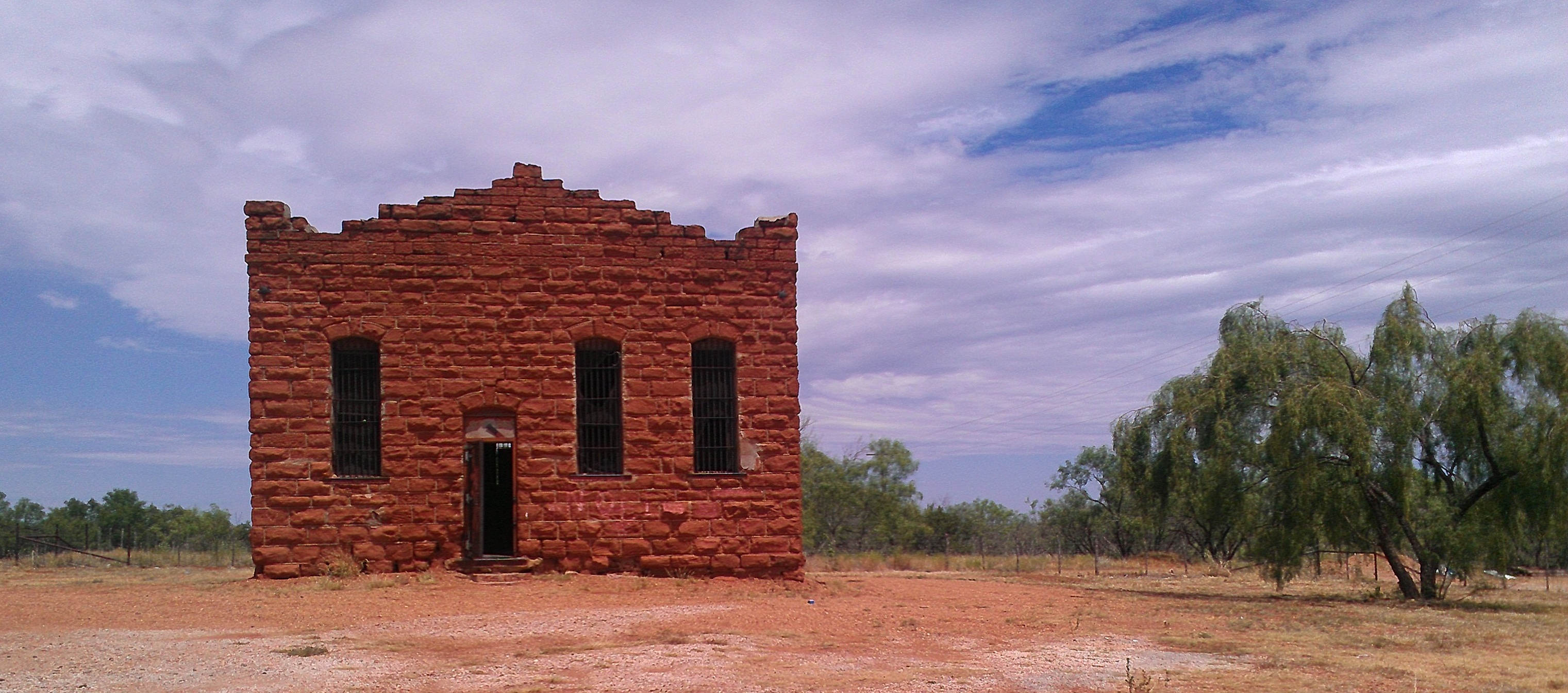
Abandoned jail in Clairemont (Kent County)

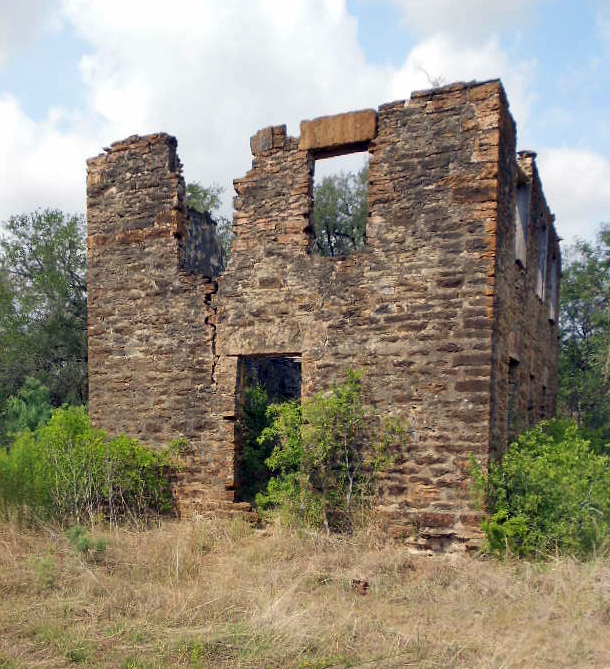
Abandoned school in Benton City (Atascosa County)

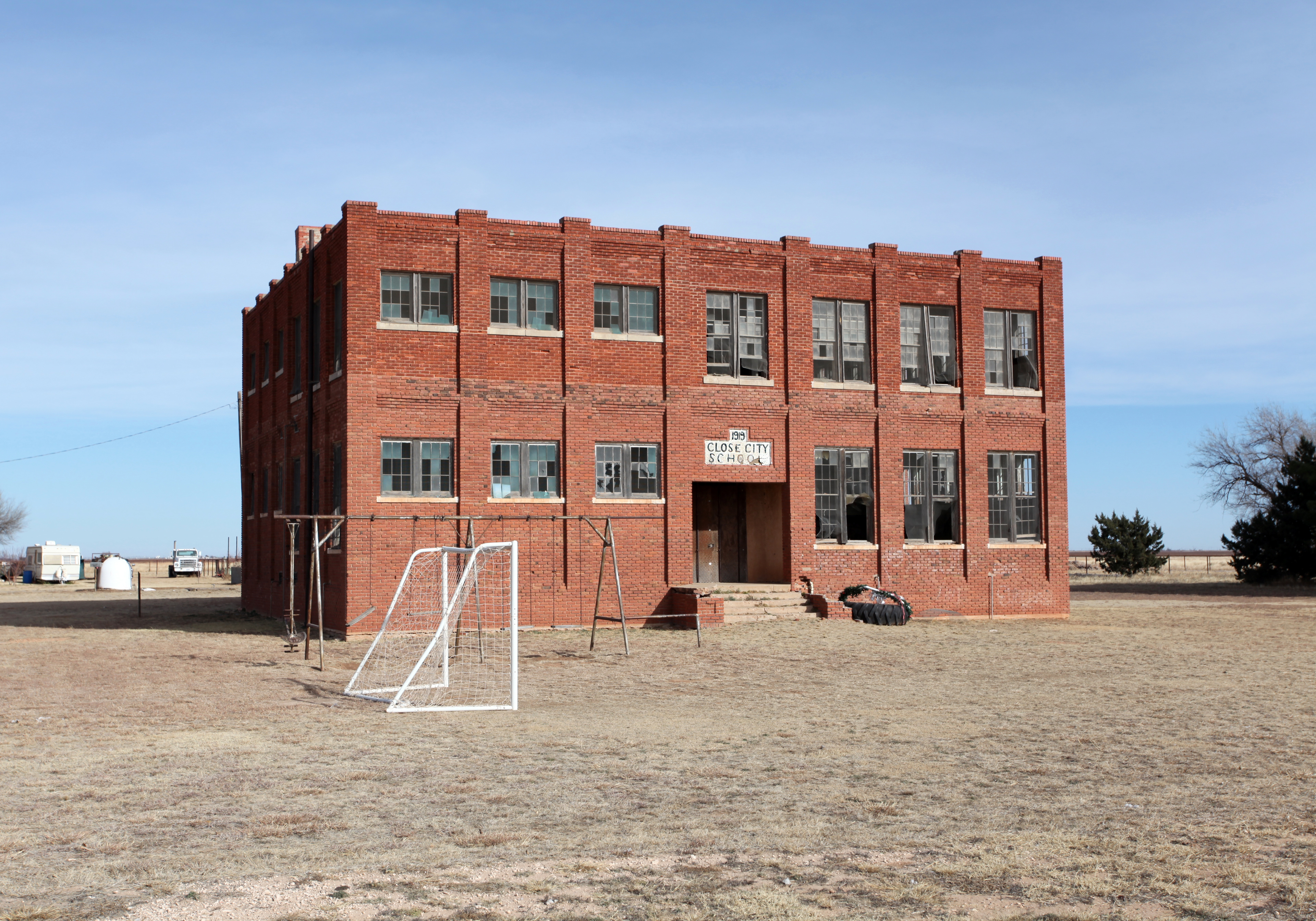
Abandoned school in Close City (Garza County)

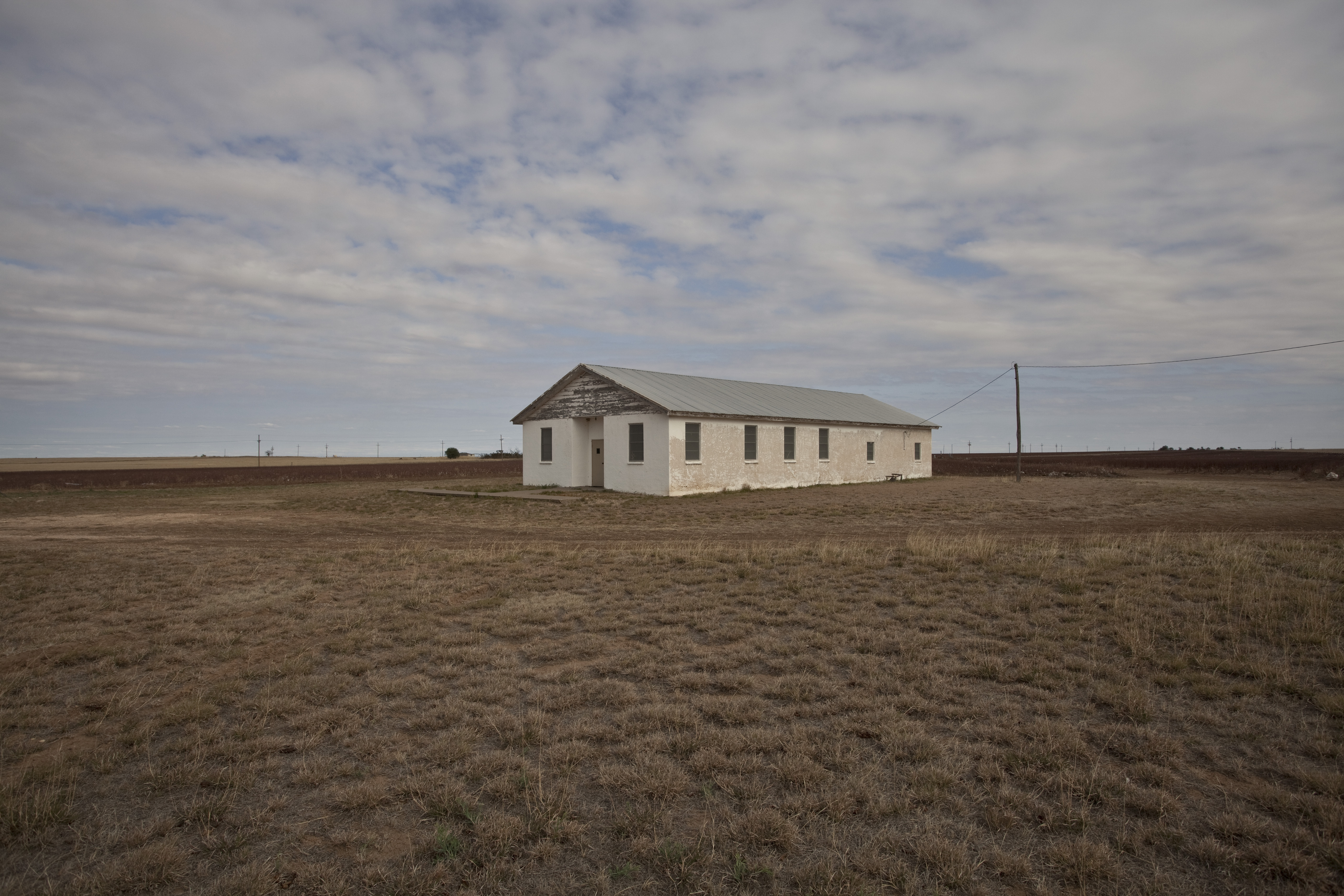
Abandoned church in Estacado (Crosby/Lubbock County)

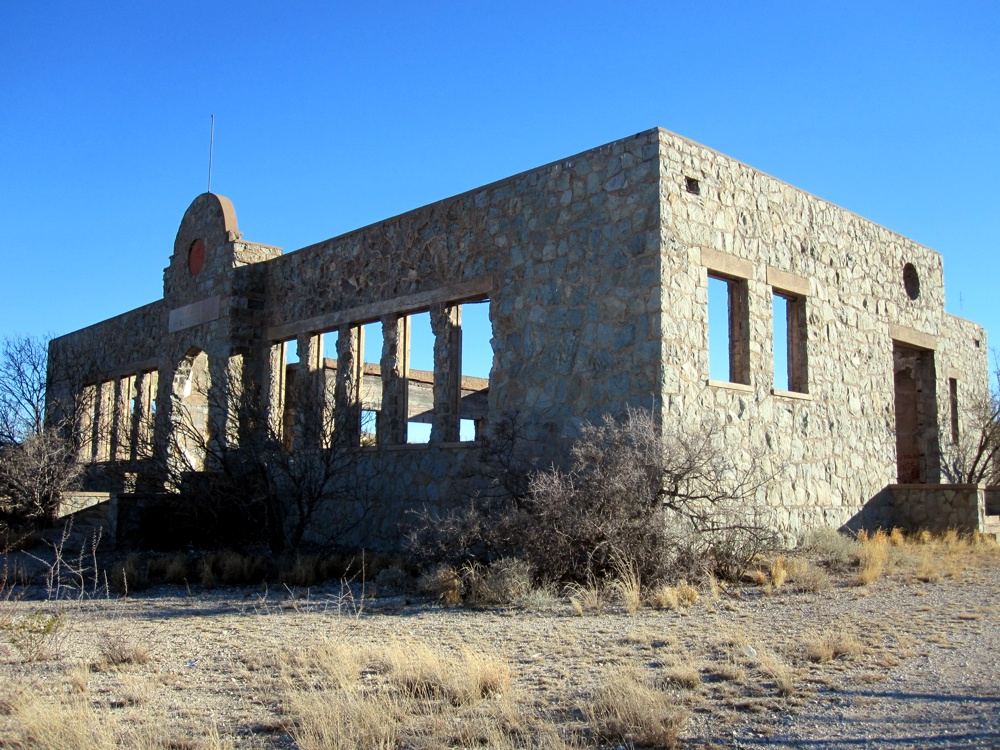
Ruins of Kent Public School (Culberson County)

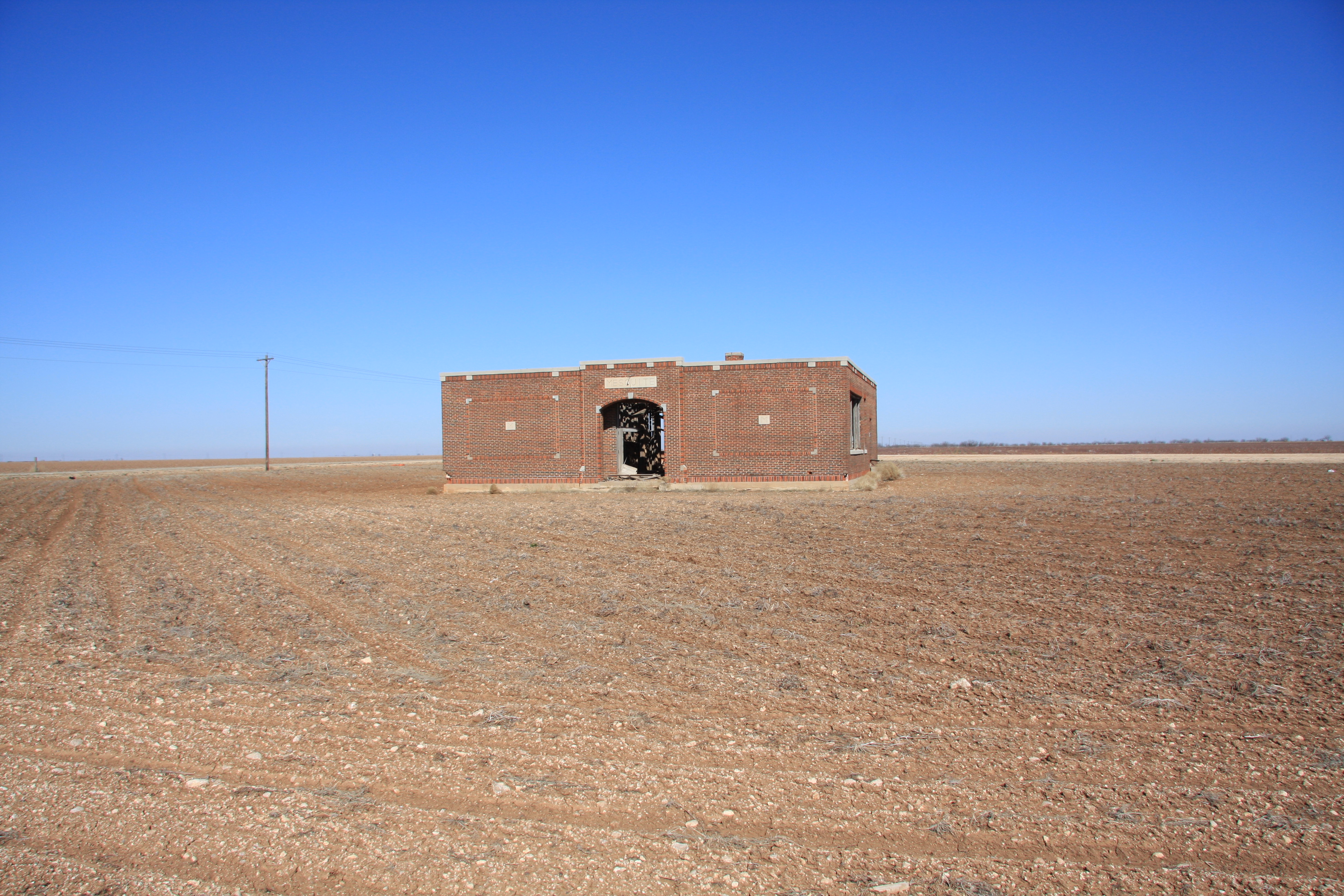
Abandoned school in Mesquite (Borden County)

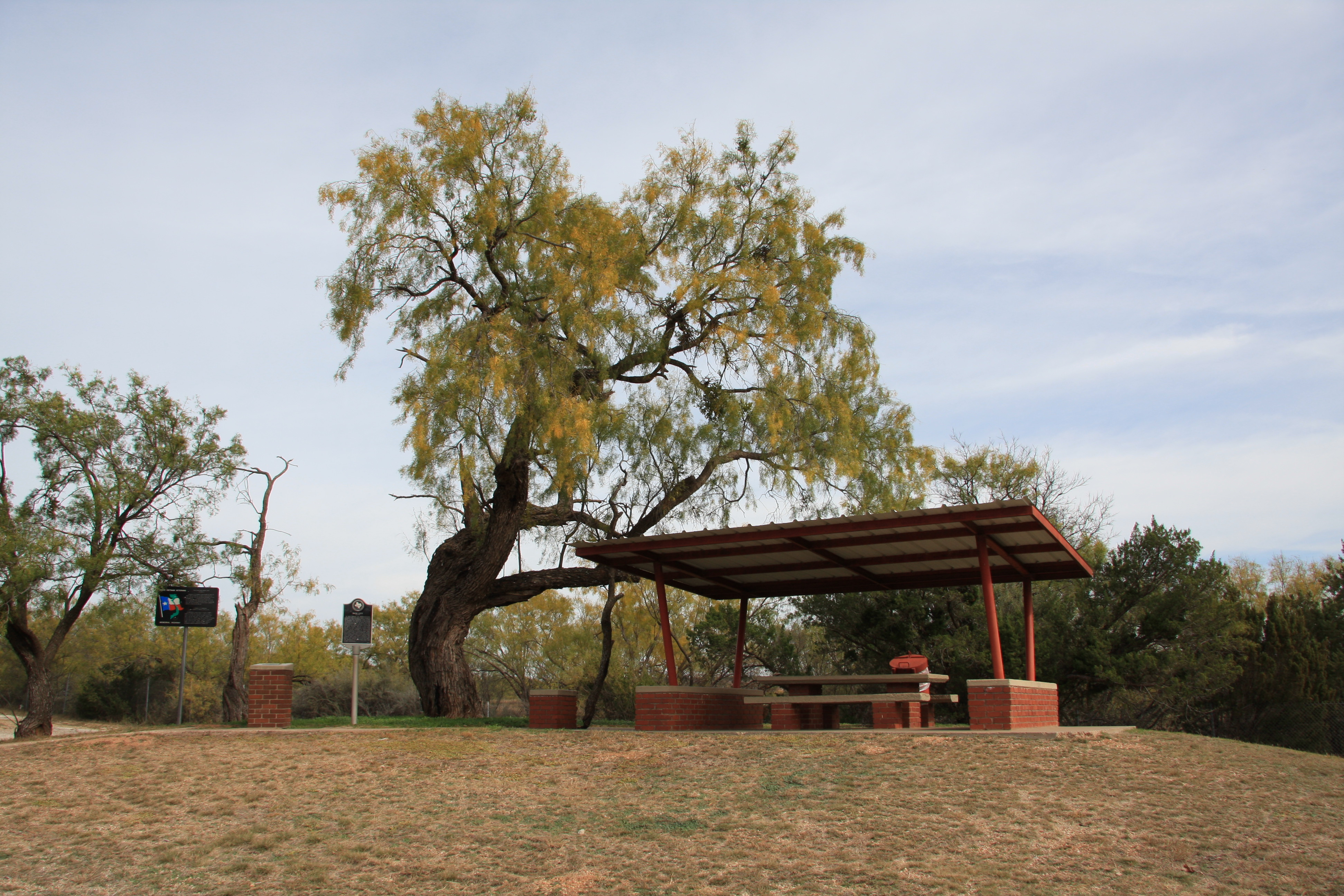
Historical marker at former Rath City (Stonewall County)

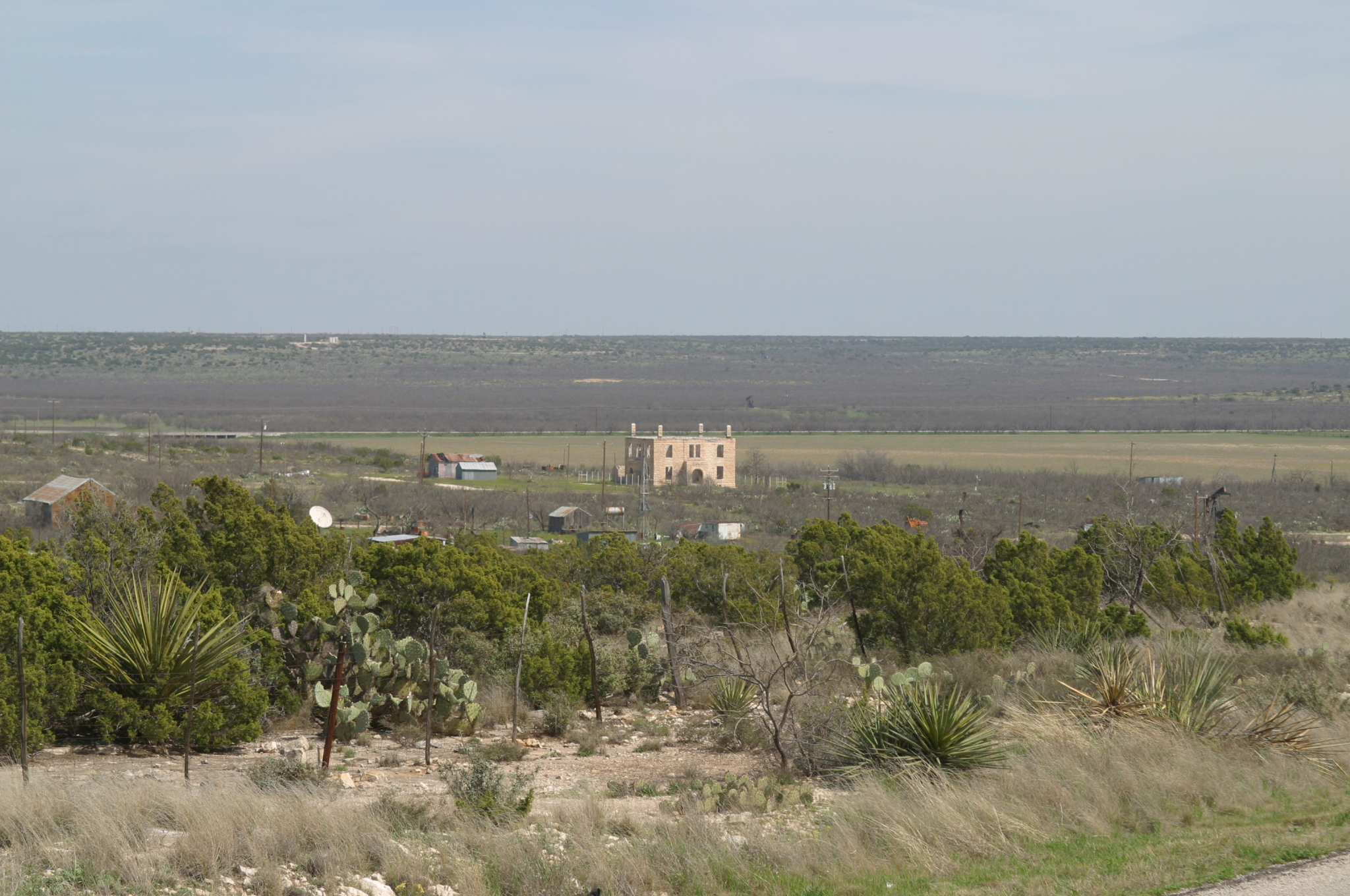
Abandoned courthouse in Stiles (Reagan County)

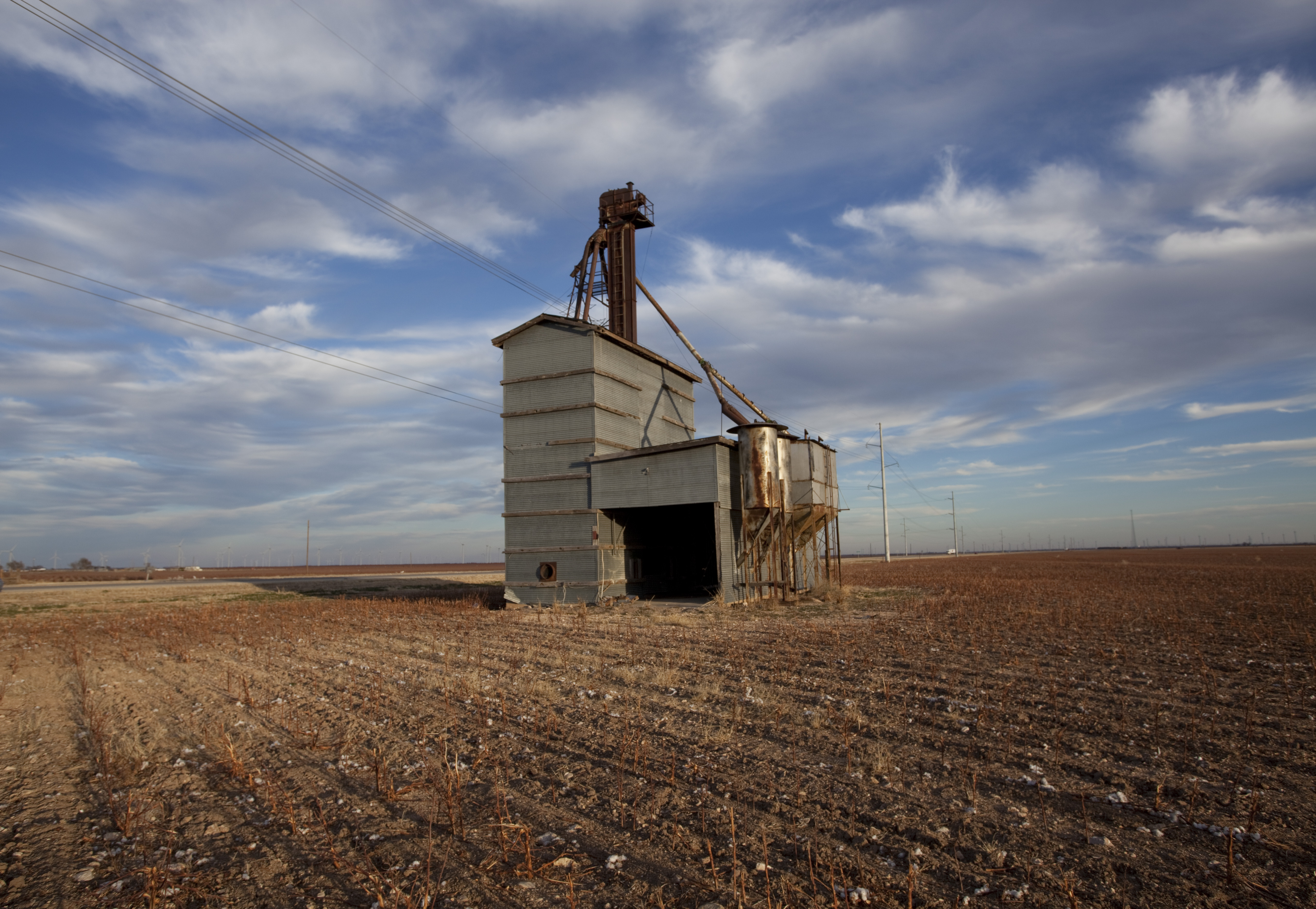
Abandoned grain elevator in Wastella (Nolan County)

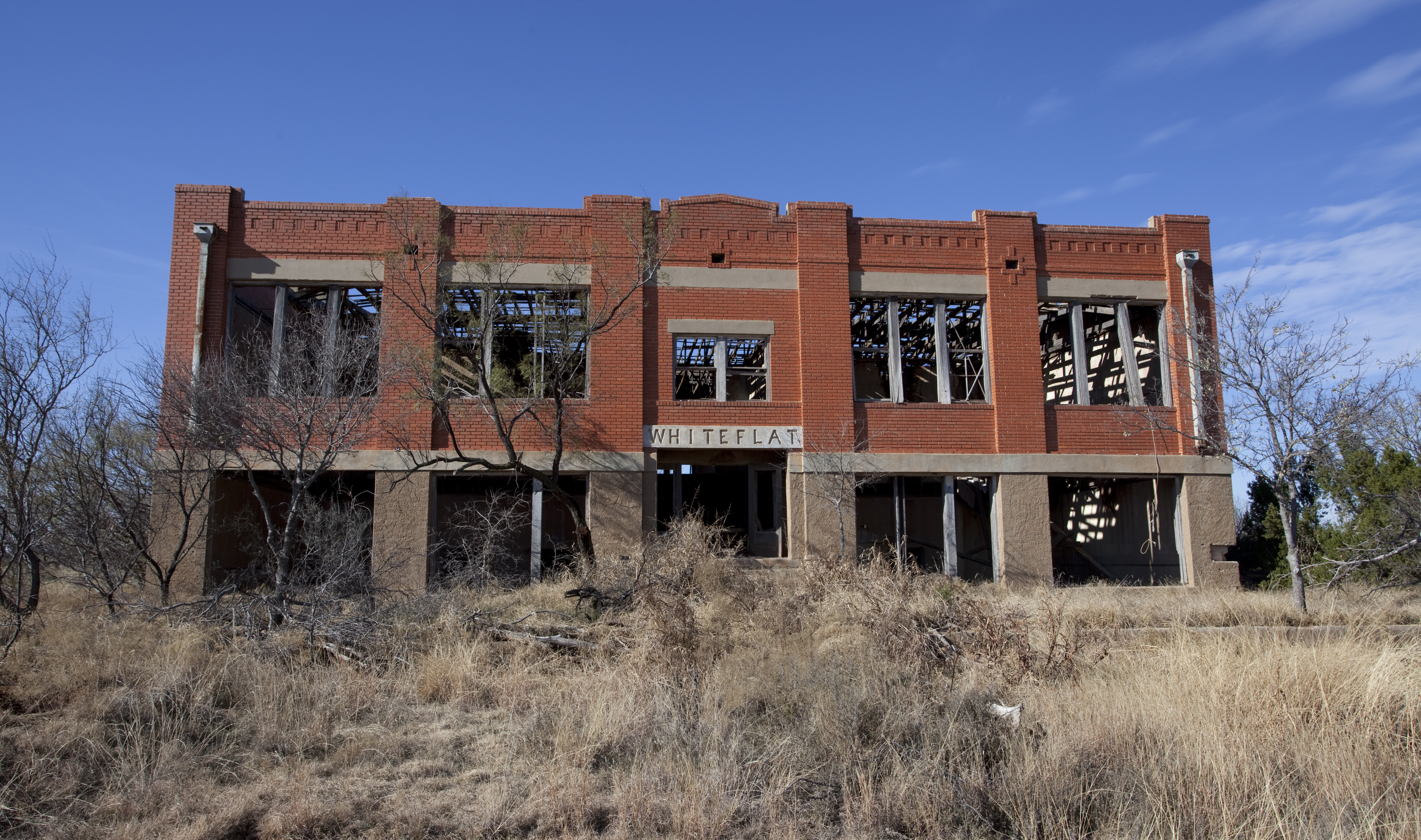
Abandoned school in Whiteflat (Motley County)

== Additional sourcing ==
- Texas – GhostTowns.com
- Texas Ghost Towns
- Texas Escapes online magazine
- Ghost Towns of Texas. Norman, OK: University of Oklahoma Press, 1986. Google Books. Retrieved August 19, 2013.
