= Sipe Springs =

Sipe Springs may refer to:

- Sipe Springs, Comanche County, Texas
- Sipe Springs, Milam County, Texas
