= New Fountain, Texas =

- Ghost town
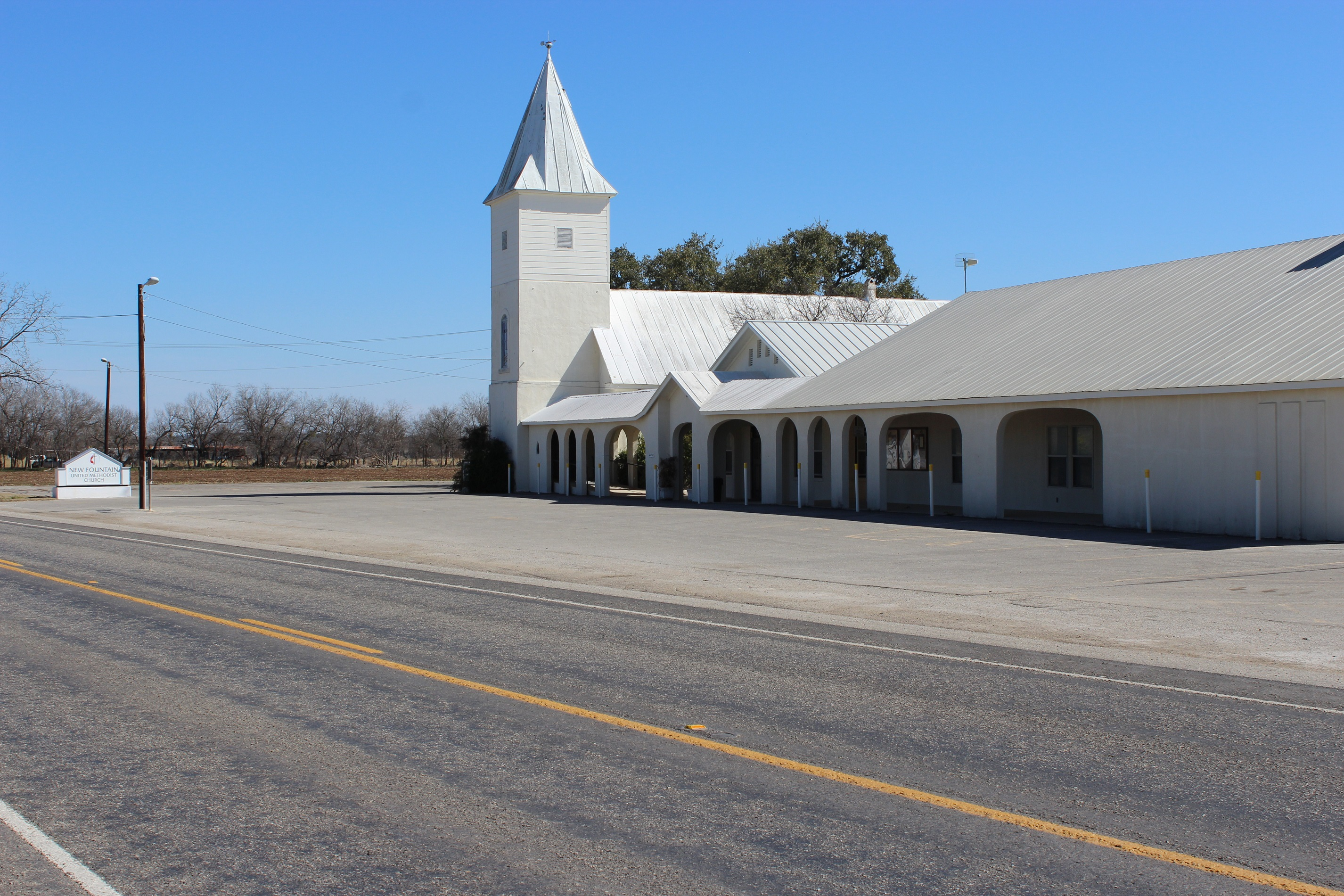

- Location within the state of Texas
- Coordinates: 29°23′12″N 99°03′36″W
- Country: United States
- State: Texas
- County: Medina
- Elevation: 853 ft (260 m)
- Time zone: UTC-6 (Central (CST))
  - Summer (DST): UTC-5 (CDT)
- Area code: 830
- FIPS code: 48-50928
- GNIS feature ID: 1380889

New Fountain is a ghost town established in 1846. It is located 1.8 miles (2.9 km) west of Quihi and 5.6 miles (9.0 km) east-northeast of Hondo in Medina County in the U.S. state of Texas. It was part of empresario Henri Castro's colonization of the Medina River Valley in the Republic of Texas.

== History ==
New Fountain was a settlement founded in 1846 by Henri Castro's colonists from the nearby settlement of Vandenburg. When the springs upstream on Verde Creek dried up, they moved to a new water source found four miles downstream, calling their settlement New Fountain for the spring. In 1857, New Fountain was the fourth post office to be established in Medina County, which remained until 1914. By 1858, Rev. John Schaper had organized a Methodist church, which with its cemetery, is now the last vestige of this old settlement remaining. By 1860, New Fountain had besides the Methodist church, a mill, and a Masonic lodge, and was a stagecoach stop on the San Antonio-El Paso Road. A New Fountain School was established in 1876, and by 1896, the community had a population of 400.
