= Frio Town =

Ghost town in Frio County, Texas

Frio Town, Texas
- Ghost town
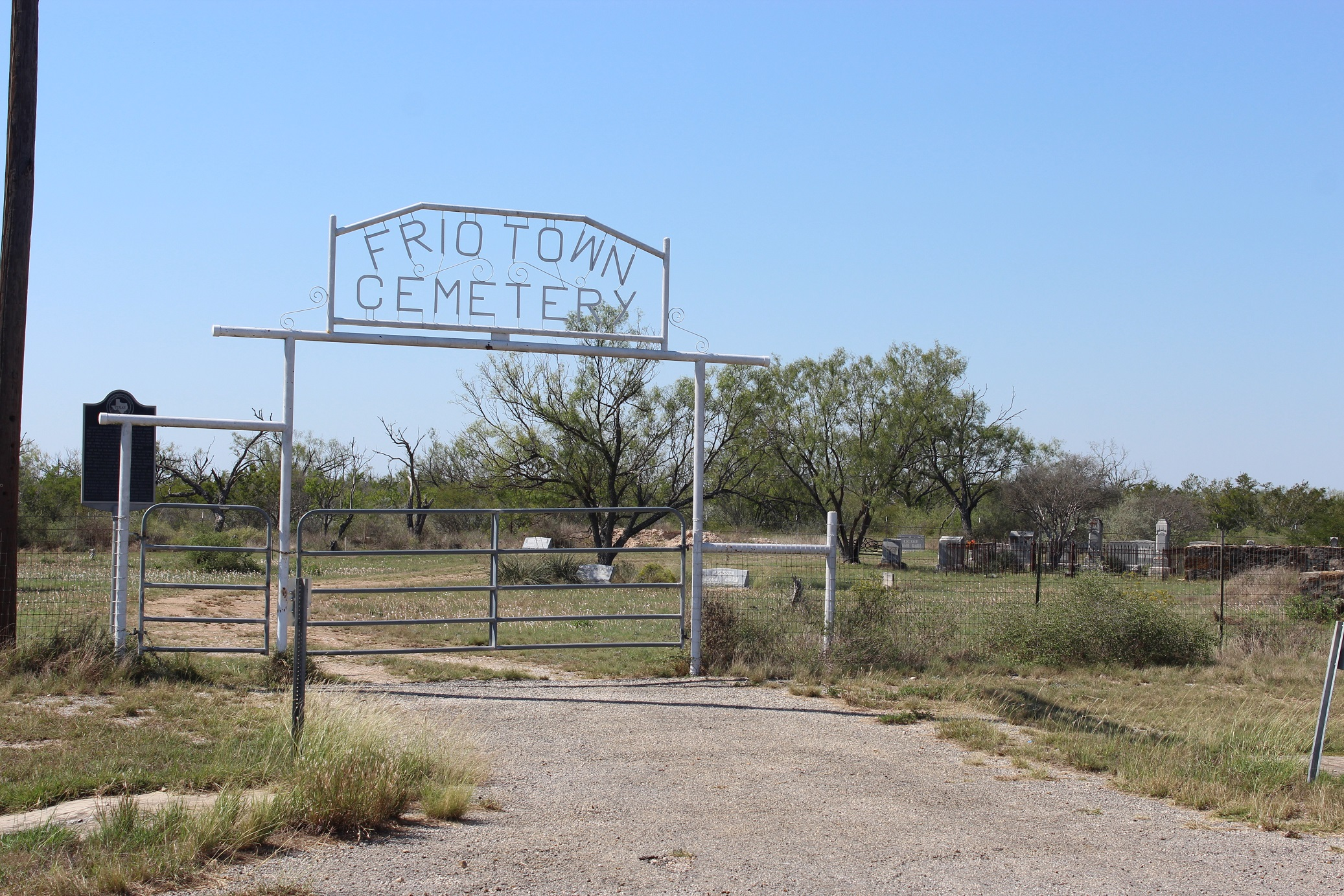
- Frio Town Cemetery
- Interactive map of Frio Town, Texas
- Country: United States
- State: Texas
- County: Frio
- Elevation: 627 ft (191 m)
- Time zone: UTC-6 (Central (CST))
  - Summer (DST): UTC-5 (CDT)
- GNIS feature ID: 1379809

Frio Town, known as Frio City before 1886, is a ghost town immediately south of the Presidio Crossing on the Frio River in Frio County, Texas, United States.

== History ==
Located 16 miles northwest of Pearsall, the town was laid out by A. L. Oden in 1871. The river crossing it lay near was named for the fact that numerous cannonballs, swords, and sabers were found there. Juan De Ugalde in the 18th century, Antonio López de Santa Anna in 1836, and Adrián Woll in 1842 were all thought to have used the Presidio Crossing.

The first mail to the town was delivered by horseback from Benton City; later, it arrived by stagecoach from San Antonio. In 1871, Frio City became the first county seat of Frio County. Carting cypress shingles from Leakey, L. J. W. Edwards completed the first Frio County courthouse in January 1872. The same year, the town's stone jail was built. The jail eventually housed such famed outlaws as Sam Bass, Jesse James, Frank James, and writer William Sydney Porter. With the rise in construction, high-cost building material from out of town became impractical and led to the establishment of a cypress shingle mill, brick factory, and lime kiln in Frio City.

In 1872, the town started delivering its own mail with the establishment of a post office in Frio City with James McClain Elledge at its helm. The town's first merchant was L. J. W. Edwards and the first school in Frio County was a private home in Frio City. During the 1870s, a local chapter of the Freemasons was established. In 1877, the courthouse burned down and was replaced by a two-story, native-stone building, funded in part by wealthy local resident W.J. Slaughter. The new courthouse reportedly once had an ornate walnut staircase. In the mid-1870s, Indian attacks in and around Frio City caused the Texas Rangers to be called in, and many frontier residents sought shelter in town. The last major Indian attack in the area occurred in the spring of 1877.

== Growth ==
Frio City became known as a "cowboy capital" and cultural center during the 1870s. By the 1880s, estimates of its population hovered around 1,500. Methodist evangelists John Wesley DeVilbiss and Andrew Jackson Potter preached in the area and the Rio Grande Baptist Association was organized in Frio City in 1880. That same year, the International-Great Northern Railroad extended through Frio County, though it bypassed Frio City.

== Decline ==
With the establishment of the town of Pearsall along the rail route, people began to leave Frio City. By 1883, Pearsall had become the county seat, and in 1886, Frio City changed its name to Frio Town. W. Yancey Kilgore purchased the Frio Town courthouse in 1884, it later housed a general store, the post office, and in 1884, the Frio Academy.

By 1890, the population had fallen to 100, and in 1906, 17 pupils attended the two-teacher Frio Academy. The town slowly dwindled into obscurity even with the addition of telephone connections in 1914. During that year, Frio Town housed a general store and six cattle breeders. In 1929, the town had a school and five homes. In June 1930, the Rio Grande Baptist Association celebrated their 50th anniversary at the site of the old courthouse.

By 1953, the townsite was mostly abandoned, and a Mrs. A.C. Roberts owned most of the structures, including the courthouse and roofless jail. The town's population remained steady at 20 throughout the 1960s and even jumped to 49 in 1969. By 1990, all that remained of the once-bustling Frio City was the Frio Town Cemetery and the largely intact ruins of the original courthouse and jail on the private Roberts Ranch. The ruins of the courthouse are considered a historic courthouse by the Texas Historical Commission.
