= Quihi, Texas =

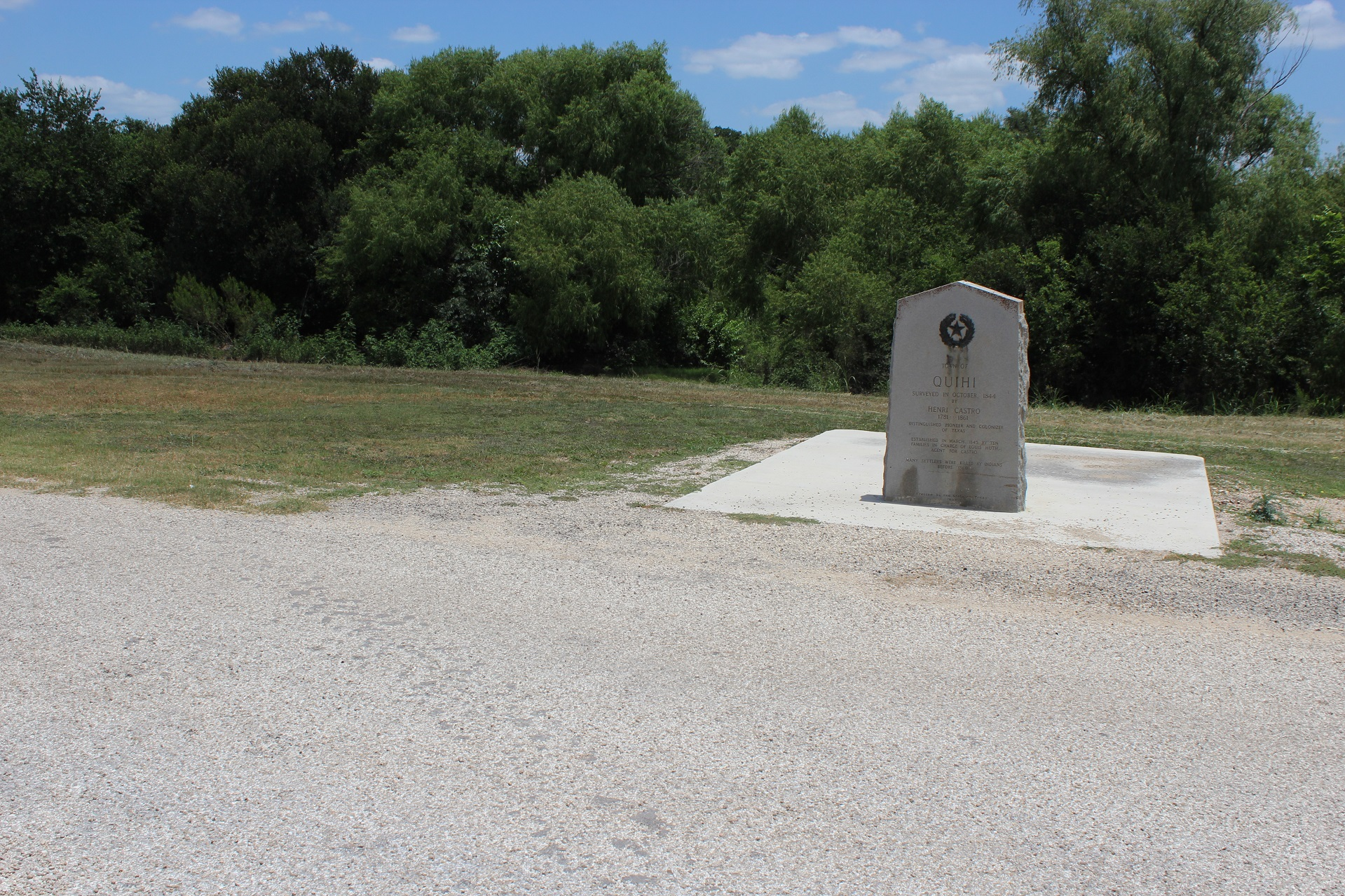

- Location within the state of Texas
- Coordinates: 29°23′30″N 99°01′48″W
- Country: United States
- State: Texas
- County: Medina
- Elevation: 846 ft (258 m)
- Time zone: UTC-6 (Central (CST))
  - Summer (DST): UTC-5 (CDT)
- Area code: 830
- FIPS code: 48-60116
- GNIS feature ID: 1380905

Quihi (/ˈkwiːhiː/ KWEE-hee) is a settlement in Medina County, in the U.S. state of Texas. Located 9 miles (14 km) north of Hondo, it sits at the intersection of Farm to Market Road 2676 and Quihi Creek. In 1936, Quihi received centennial marker Number 5537, a gray granite marker placed to commemorate the Texas Centennial.

== Establishment ==
In 1845, basque empresario Henri Castro laid out the town on Quihi Lake. The first of Castro's colony's families who arrived in 1846 were from the Alsace region.

One week after their arrival, two families were slaughtered by Indians; the colonists tried to fortify the settlement against Indian depredations, but were targets of repeated incidents until the 1870s.

Bethlehem Lutheran Church was established in 1852, and continues to function as a church today. The Lindeburg School of Quihi opened in 1856, and functioned until 1907, when a new school was built two miles west of this site.

== Post office ==
Louis Boehle was the first postmaster when the Quihi post office was established in 1854. The post office was discontinued in 1872, and the mail routed to New Fountain.

== 20th and 21st centuries ==
The Quihi Schützen Verein (marksmen club) was established in 1890. The club is still active, but was renamed the Quihi Gun Club, claiming a county-wide membership abovef 1,000.

The Quihi population has fluctuated over the years, but has remained small.
