= Phelan =

== Places ==
- Phelan, Alabama, an unincorporated community
- Phelan, California, an unincorporated town
- Phelan, Texas, a ghost town

== Commerce ==
- Phelan Green Group, a South African independent renewable energy producer

== Other uses ==
- Phelan (surname), people with the surname Phelan
