= Esperanza, Texas =

Esperanza, Texas may refer to:

- Esperanza, Hudspeth County, Texas, an unincorporated community
- Esperanza, Montgomery County, Texas, a ghost town
