= Pleasant Hill, Texas =

Pleasant Hill may refer to:

- Pleasant Hill, Cass County, Texas
- Pleasant Hill, Cherokee County, Texas
- Pleasant Hill, Eastland County, Texas
- Pleasant Hill, Fort Bend County, Texas
- Pleasant Hill, Hopkins County, Texas
- Pleasant Hill, Houston County, Texas
- Pleasant Hill, Lamar County, Texas
- Pleasant Hill, Live Oak County, Texas
- Pleasant Hill, McLennan County, Texas
- Pleasant Hill, Milam County, Texas
- Pleasant Hill, Nacogdoches County, Texas
- Pleasant Hill, Polk County, Texas
- Pleasant Hill, San Augustine County, Texas
- Pleasant Hill, Smith County, Texas
- Pleasant Hill, Travis County, Texas
- Pleasant Hill, Upshur County, Texas
- Pleasant Hill, Van Zandt County, Texas
- Pleasant Hill, Washington County, Texas
- Pleasant Hill, Williamson County, Texas
- Pleasant Hill, Yoakum County, Texas
