= Palm Valley, Williamson County, Texas =

- Location within the state of Texas Palm Valley, Williamson County, Texas (the United States)
- Coordinates: 30°32′36″N 97°37′16″W
- Country: United States
- State: Texas
- County: Williamson
- Elevation: 709 ft (216 m)
- Time zone: UTC-6 (Central (CST))
  - Summer (DST): UTC-5 (CDT)
- Area code: 512
- FIPS code

Palm Valley is a ghost town, a formerly independent community on U.S. Route 79, now incorporated into Round Rock, in the county of Williamson, in the U.S. state of Texas.

The community was named for its founder, Swedish settler Anna Palm, a widow with six sons, who arrived in 1853. The family lived in tents, and eventually built a house. The Palm family was shortly followed by other Swedish immigrants. The Palm Valley Lutheran Church was built in 1872 and doubled as a schoolhouse. In 1970, the church was designated a Recorded Texas Historic Landmark.

Anna's son, Andrew J. Palm, built his own home in 1873. The house was moved to Round Rock in 1976. Two years later the home was also designated a Recorded Texas Historic Landmark and was open to the public as the Palm House Museum. In 2019, the museum closed. By the beginning of the 21st century, Palm Valley Lutheran Church remained but the community had lost its distinct identity.

== See also ==
- List of ghost towns in Texas
