= Sowers, Texas =

- Ghost town
- Location within Texas Sowers, TX (the United States)
- Coordinates: 32°49′42″N 96°59′26″W
- Country: United States
- State: Texas
- County: Dallas
- Settled: 1848
- Founded by: E. D. Sowers
- Elevation: 531 ft (162 m)

Population (1905)
  - Total: 121
- Time zone: UTC-6 (CST)
- FIPS code: 48113
- GNIS feature ID: 1347617

Sowers is a ghost town located approximately 11 miles northwest of Dallas, Texas in Dallas County. Today, the once rural community is located entirely within the boundaries of Irving, Texas. Of the original townsite, only the cemetery remains.

== History ==
Sowers was settled in the late 1840s and by 1884 had a population of seventy-five and possessed several businesses including a blacksmith, a church, a doctor, a druggist, a school, and two steam gristmill-cotton gins. A post office was established in 1881, it and the town were named after early pioneer E. D. Sowers. The population was listed at 121 residents in 1905 and remained at or near that figure until the 1950s, when the community's last reported population was a mere thirty residents in 1956. Sowers was annexed by Irving soon thereafter.

=== Attempted Capture of Bonnie and Clyde ===
Sowers gained notoriety on November 21, 1933, when renowned criminals Bonnie Parker and Clyde Barrow met family members at dusk near what is now Texas Highway 183 approximately one and a quarter miles northwest of the community, where Barrow had arranged a clandestine picnic to celebrate his mother's fifty-ninth birthday. Since Barrow had not had a gift to present his mother, the pair planned to return the following evening for an extended visit at which time he planned to give her a gift. On November 22, 1933, as Parker and Barrow approached the previous evening's family meeting spot, law enforcement officers Smoot Schmidt, Ted Hinton, Ed Caster, and Bob Alcorn; armed with Thompson submachine guns, .351 "Bullhead" repeating rifle, and BAR (Browning Automatic Rifles) opened a fusillade of gunfire from a ditch about seventy-five feet away. Upon their accelerated escape, several .30 caliber rounds from Bob Alcorn's BAR pierced the driver side door of Clyde's stolen 1933 Ford V-8 five-window coupe wounding both Parker and Barrow with shots to the knees. The pair subsequently abandoned the car and fled. Hinton and Alcorn later participated in the fatal ambush that halted Barrow and Parker's spree on May 23, 1934, near Gibsland, Louisiana.
