= Fuqua, Texas =

Fuqua
- Ghost town
- Location of Fuqua in Texas.
- Coordinates: 30°26′50″N 94°44′11″W
- Country: United States
- State: Texas
- County: Liberty County
- Elevation: 115 ft (35 m)
- Time zone: UTC-6 (CST)
  - Summer (DST): UTC-5 (CDT)

Fuqua is a ghost town located in Liberty County, Texas, United States.

== Geography ==
Fuqua was located 56 miles northwest of Beaumont, Texas in the northeastern corner of Liberty County, Texas. The old site of Fuqua is located in the thick woods off of Farm to Market Road 787 (today, the road is named County Road 2650). The elevation is 115 ft (about 35 m).
