= Pila Blanca, Texas =

Ghost town

Coordinates: 27°48′23″N 98°28′22″W

Pila Blanca is a ghost town in Duval County, Texas, United States, located a mile and a half south of Highway 44 on Farm to Market Road 3196. It is ten miles southeast of Freer and twenty-five miles west of Alice. Today, there are a few residences and buildings remaining, but the precise population is unknown. A cemetery and an old water tower still exist in town.

== See also ==
- List of ghost towns in Texas
