= Minters Chapel, Texas =

Minters Chapel
- Ghost town
- Location within Texas Location within the United States
- Coordinates: 32°53′08″N 97°03′38″W
- Country: United States
- State: Texas
- County: Tarrant

Minters Chapel is a ghost town in eastern Tarrant County in the U.S. state of Texas. The land was acquired by the Dallas-Fort Worth Regional Airport (which later became the International airport) in 1967. The cemetery remains to the west of the airport, in Grapevine.

== History ==
Minters Chapel was founded c1854 when Peter's Colony Minister Green Washington Minter (1803-1887) moved to the area and established Minter's Chapel Methodist Church with the help of his son-in-law James Cate. The earliest grave in the church cemetery is that of A.M. Newton in 1857.

The church was relocated to Heritage Ave. following the airports purchase of the land, the cemetery remains unaffected.
