= Tip Top, Texas =

Ghost town in Rusk County, Texas

Tip Top
- Ghost town
- Country: United States
- State: Texas
- County: Rusk County

Population
  - Total: 0

Tip Top is a ghost town located on the Henderson and Overton Railroad, in Rusk County, Texas, United States, about 1 mile (1.6 km) north of Henderson. The community was home to the headquarters of an oil company and had infrastructures such as loading tracks and oil storage.

== See also ==
- List of ghost towns in Texas
- Tip Top, Arizona
