= Wintergreen, Texas =

Wintergreen is a ghost town in northeastern Karnes County, Texas, United States. It once stood at the intersection of the Victoria-San Antonio Roads and the lower Helena-Gonzales Roads. Wintergreen appeared on maps from 1858 to 1868, including an 1865 Civil War map.

== See also ==
- List of ghost towns in Texas
