= Vandenburg, Texas =

Ghost town in Texas, US

Vandenburg
- Ghost town
- Location in Texas
- Coordinates: 29.42727900°N 99.11705900°W
- Country: United States
- State: Texas
- County: Medina

Vandenburg, formerly Castroville, is a ghost town in Medina County, Texas, United States.

== History ==
Situated near Verde and Lucky Creek, Vandenburg was the second settlement of Henri Castro; he named it Castroville, after himself. In 1846, while establishing other settlements, August Ferdinand Louis Huth was appointed in charge in Castro's absence. Verde Creek ran dry, and settlers moved to establish New Fountain. The town was barren by 1989.
