= Cuthbert, Texas =

Abandoned town in Texas, United States

- Ghost Town
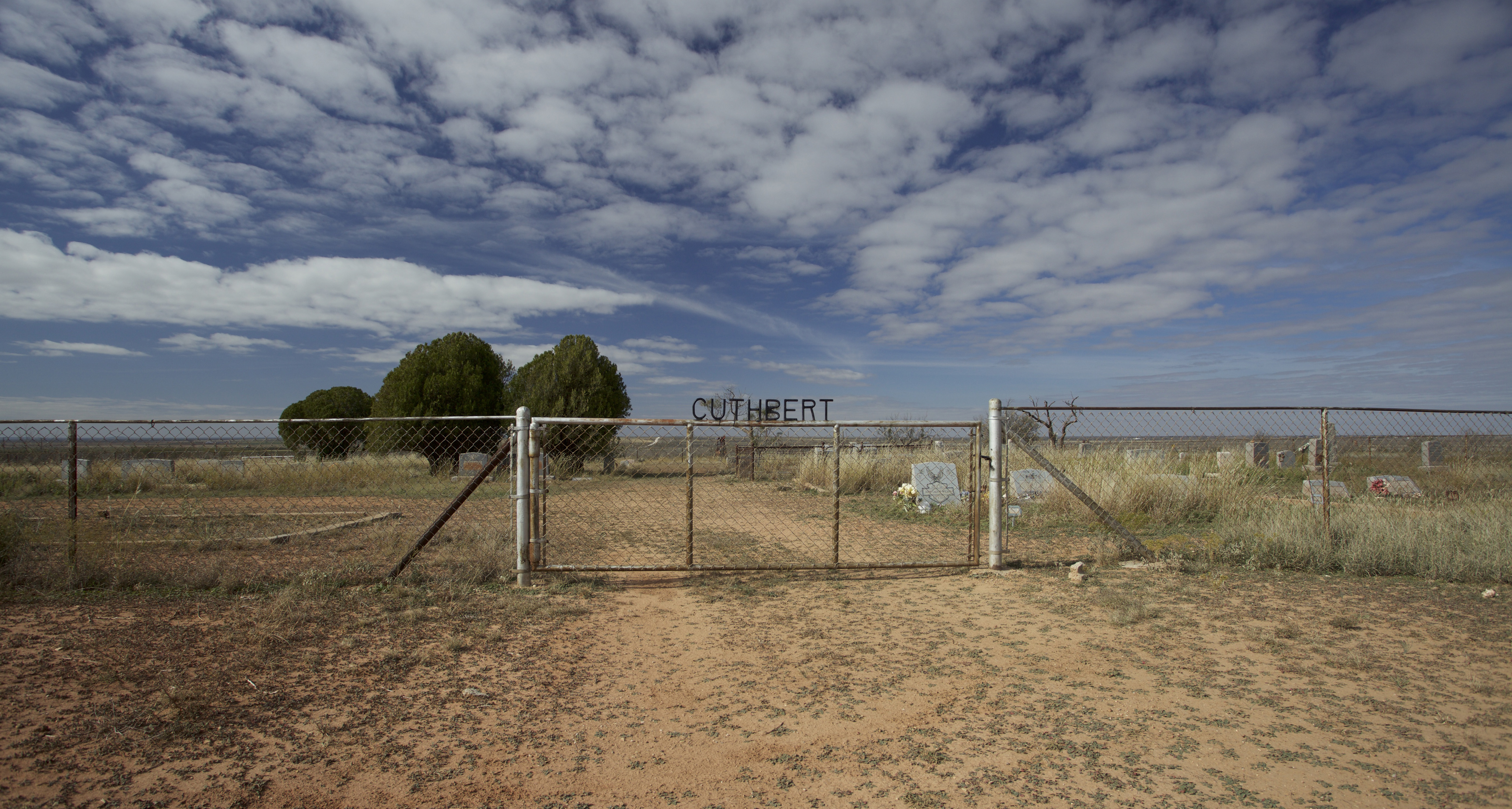
- Cuthbert Cemetery

- Location within Texas
- Coordinates: 32°28′53″N 101°01′55″W
- Country: United States
- State: Texas
- County: Mitchell
- Region: Llano Estacado
- Established: 1890
- Founder: D. T. Bozeman
- Elevation: 2,251 ft (686 m)
- Time zone: UTC-6 (CST)
- Website: Cuthbert, TX from the Handbook of Texas Online

Cuthbert is a ghost town in Mitchell County, Texas, United States. Cuthbert was established in 1890 when the founder D. T. Bozeman built a wagon yard and store. The community and post office were named for Thomas Cuthbertson, a family friend of the Bozemans. By the early 1920s, Cuthbert had a church, two stores, a blacksmith shop, a cotton gin, telephone office, and a school. In 1920, the T. and P. Abrams No. 1 oil well, one of the first commercial oil ventures in the Permian Basin, was drilled just over a mile north of the town. A post office, two businesses, and a population of twenty-five were reported at the community in 1936, the year that its school was consolidated with that of Colorado City. After World War II, the improvement of rural roads in the area led to Cuthbert's decline as it lost its trade to Colorado City. The Cuthbert post office was discontinued circa 1960, when the town reported one business and a population of twenty-five. By 1974, only a cemetery and scattered farms remained in the area.

== See also ==
- List of ghost towns in Texas
- Texas State Highway 350
- Ira, Texas
- Colorado River (Texas)
