= Pumpville, Texas =

Pumpville
- Ghost town
- Location in the state of Texas
- Coordinates: 29°56′33.1″N 101°44′06.7″W
- Country: United States
- State: Texas
- County: Val Verde
- Founded: 1882
- Elevation: 1,740 ft (530 m)

Population (2010)
  - Total: 0
- Time zone: UTC-6 (Central (CST))
  - Summer (DST): UTC-5 (CDT)
- ZIP codes: ?
- Area code: ?
- GNIS feature ID: ?

Pumpville is a ghost town in Val Verde County, Texas, United States.

== History ==
The village was founded in 1882, following the construction of the Galveston, Harrisburg and San Antonio Railway, on which it had a station, now closed. A post office operated from 1899 until 1970 and a Baptist Church is still operating. From 1968 until 2000, Pumpville had a population of 21.

== Geography ==
Located on the Amtrak railway routes Sunset Limited and Texas Eagle between Sanderson and Del Rio stations, Pumpville lies on the Ranch to Market Road 1865, a few miles east of the borders of Terrell County, 12 miles east of the ghost town of Cedar Station.
