= Princeton, Newton County, Texas =

Coordinates: 30°19′34″N 93°48′06″W

Princeton is a ghost town in Newton County, Texas, United States, along the Sabine River.

== History ==
The town was located on the Sabine River near the site of Deweyville, about 30 miles northeast of Beaumont in southeastern Newton County. The site was platted in 1839 on Princeton Bluff (also known as Possum Bluff). It became a ferry and boat landing site for travellers on the Sabine River. A post office briefly opened from 1880 to 1881. The town never really grew in size, and as Deweyville rose to prominence, the town was abandoned around the turn of the 20th century.

== See also ==
- List of ghost towns in Texas
