= McDuff, Texas =

Ghost town in Texas, U.S.

Coordinates: 30°13′28″N 97°27′46″W

McDuff is a ghost town in Bastrop County, Texas, United States. The community was located eight miles southwest of Elgin, 12 miles northwest of Bastrop, and 25 miles east of Austin. It was on an old stage mail route from Bastrop to Austin. Today, the town site would correspond roughly with the intersection of Farm to Market Road 969 and Upper Elgin River Road.

== History ==
The town was granted a post office in 1886, with James A. Wood as the first postmaster. The facility operated until 1906.

During the 1890s, the community had a population of 30, a general store, and a saloon. A one-teacher school with 19 students was known to be operating in 1905. In 1907, when Bastrop County commissioners' court divided the county into school districts, a district school was located in McDuff. The school was merged with the Elgin Independent School District in 1949.

During the 1940s, McDuff disappeared from county highway maps.

The McDuff Cemetery is now known as the J J Manor Cemetery, located on the Travis County side of the Travis/Bastrop county boundary.

== See also ==
- List of ghost towns in Texas
