= Parris, Texas =

- Ghost town
- Location within the state of Texas
- Coordinates: 33°15′10″N 96°36′21″W
- Country: United States
- State: Texas
- Counties: Collin
- Elevation: 551 ft (168 m)
- Time zone: UTC-6
  - Summer (DST): UTC-5 (CDT)
- ZIP code: 75454
- Area codes: 214, 469, 972
- GNIS feature ID: 2034654

Parris, Texas is a community that once existed just south of Melissa in central Collin County near the banks of the East Fork of the Trinity River.

== History ==
In 1859 Thaddeus Parris, a Mexican–American War veteran for whom the community was named built an ox-turned gristmill at this location. This attracted settlers of the area during the next decade and until sometime in the late nineteenth or early twentieth century Parris remained a community center for area farmers.
