= Madera Springs, Texas =

- Ghost town
- Location within Texas Location within the United States
- Coordinates: 30°51′19″N 103°57′00″W
- Country: United States
- State: Texas
- County: Jeff Davis
- Elevation: 4,961 ft (1,512 m)
- Time zone: UTC-6 (Central (CST))
  - Summer (DST): UTC-5 (CDT)
- ZIP codes: 79734
- Area code: 915
- GNIS feature ID: 1362060

Madera Springs is a ghost town in Jeff Davis County, Texas, United States, located fourteen miles southwest of Toyahvale. Between 1964 and 1987, its recorded population was 2.
