= Mineral Springs, Texas =

Ghost town in Texas, United States

Coordinates: 32.2923°N 94.4891°W

Mineral Springs is a ghost town in Panola County, Texas, United States. Named for its springs, it was located approximately 2.5 miles (4.0 km) southeast of Tatum, on the south side of Texas State Highway 149.

== History ==
It was once a village of the Anadarko people. A small fort was built and the area was settled in 1833 by Daniel Martin. The spring water was used by settlers. In the 1870s, an African-American church was built there. A logging camp was established at Mineral Springs, and lumber was shipped on the Texas, Sabine Valley and Northwestern Railway. A flag stop operated there between 1888 and 1910. The church collapsed by 1948, and is now covered by woods.

== See also ==
- List of ghost towns in Texas
