= Royal King =

Quarter Horse show horse and sire

- Breed: Quarter Horse
- Discipline: Cutting
- Sire: King P-234
- Grandsire: Zantanon
- Dam: Rocket Laning
- Maternal grandsire: Dolph
- Sex: Stallion
- Foaled: 1943
- Country: United States
- Color: Sorrel

Other awards
- AQHA Performance Register of Merit, AQHA Superior Cutting Horse, NCHA Reserve World Champion, NCHA Silver Award, NCHA Bronze Award

Honors
- American Quarter Horse Hall of Fame
- Last updated on: January 12, 2008.

Royal King was an outstanding cutting stallion and Quarter horse sire from the early days of the American Quarter Horse Association (or AQHA).

== Life ==
Royal King was a 1943 sorrel stallion registered with the AQHA as number 2392. He was bred by Felton Smathers of Llano, Texas and owned at the time of registration by Whiteside and Albin of Sipe Springs, Texas. His sire was King P-234 and his dam was a mare named Rocket Laning that was eventually registered with the AQHA as number 39,024. She was sired by Dolph, and out of an unregistered mare named Cricket sired by Coldy. Rocket Laning was a double descendant of Yellow Jacket, so Royal King had three lines to Yellow Jacket, since King also traced once to Yellow Jacket.

== Show career ==
In his show career, he earned a Performance Register of Merit and a Superior Cutting Horse award from the AQHA. With the National Cutting Horse Association (or NCHA) he earned $24,003.19 in cutting competition, entitling him to a NCHA Certificate of Ability, and Bronze and Silver awards.

== Breeding record ==
He sired, among others, Miss Nancy Bailey, Major King, Royal Chess, Royal Jazzy, and Sketer Conway. Three of his daughters produced offspring that earned a Race Register of Merit with the AQHA. His offspring Miss Nancy Bailey and Royal Chess were inducted into the NCHA Horse Hall of Fame. Miss Nancy Bailey was the 1952 and 1953 AQHA High Point Cutting Horse, and Royal Lightning was the 1963 AQHA High Point Western Pleasure Stallion. Royal Chess was the Youth AQHA World Champion Cutting Horse.

== Death and honors ==
He died in 1971 and was inducted into the AQHA Hall of Fame in 1997.

== Pedigree ==
Traveler
Little Joe
Jenny
Zantanon
Billy by Big Jim
Jeanette
mare by Sykes' Rondo
King P-234
Yellow Jacket
Strait Horse
Gardner quarter mare
Jabalina
Traveler
mare by Traveler
unknown
Royal King
Yellow Jacket
Cremo
unknown
Dolph
King by One Eyed Kingfisher
Mamie
unknown
Rocket Laning
Yellow Jacket
Coldy
unknown
Cricket
unknown
Rose
unknown
