= Dias e Ocho Creek Camp, Texas =

Dias e Ocho Creek Camp is a ghost town in Presidio County, Texas. It was founded as a United States Army camp built around the same time as nearby Fort Holland. These two camps were built as defense against Francisco Villa and his cohort of bandits. It was abandoned after World War I and is now located within the private Quinn Ranch property.
