= Warren, Fannin County, Texas =

Ghost town in Fannin County, Texas, United States

Coordinates: 30.614°N 94.407°W

Warren was a town in present-day Fannin County, Texas, United States, the site of Fort Warren in the early 19th century. It lay near the border with Grayson County on the Red River. Warren was the county seat of Fannin County when that county was established in 1837. However, when the county seat was moved to Bonham in 1843, Warren began a period of decline. It served as a logistical station for the Confederacy during the Civil War, but was bypassed by the railroad after the war. As a result, it eventually became uninhabited; its post office closed in 1876.

The original courthouse was removed from Warren in the 1920s with an eye toward moving it to Bonham as a historic landmark, but this was never completed.

== See also ==
- List of ghost towns in Texas
