= Cedar Station, Texas =

Cedar Station
- Ghost town
- Location in the state of Texas
- Coordinates: 29°54′56″N 101°54′39″W
- Country: United States
- State: Texas
- County: Terrell
- Founded: 1947
- Elevation: 1,864 ft (568 m)

Population (2010)
  - Total: 0
- Time zone: UTC-6 (Central (CST))
  - Summer (DST): UTC-5 (CDT)
- GNIS feature ID: (no longer supported by GNIS)

Cedar Station is a ghost town in Terrell County, Texas, United States.

== History ==
The village was founded in 1947 by T.H. Eastman and family, and was composed of a wooden house and a gas station on the U.S. Highway 90. It was abandoned a few decades later.

== Geography ==
Cedar Station lies 16 miles east of Dryden, 38 east of Sanderson, the county seat; and 12 west of the ghost town of Pumpville, in the adjacent Val Verde County. The Mexican border, on the Rio Grande River, is 12 miles south.

== See also ==
- List of ghost towns in Texas
