= Sher-Han, Texas =

Coordinates: 36.4976°N 101.4642°W

Sher-Han is a ghost town in northwestern Hansford County, Texas near the Oklahoma border. The town was constructed during World War II as an industrial camp for employees of the Phillips Petroleum Company, the Panhandle Eastern Pipe Line Company, and the Michigan Wisconsin Pipe Line Company.

Sher-Han's name was derived from the Phillips Hansford natural gas liquids extraction plant and its Sherman plant. The site was in a remote location with no paved roads so the companies built low rent housing for their employees. At its peak Sher-Han had a population of about 400 people with 105 homes, a community center, a Baptist church and a grocery store with a gas station.

Sher-han was shut down in the 1960s as it became a liability to have families living close to an industrial plant storing potentially explosive materials. The church and most houses were moved although some houses were abandoned. The rest of the town's buildings were closed.

Foundations of houses remain along with some still standing barns and bunkhouses.

The location is closed to the public but may be viewed from Texas State road 9.

== See also ==
- List of ghost towns in Texas
