= Belzora, Texas =

Coordinates: 32.6°N 95.2°W

Belzora is a ghost town located in Smith County, Texas, United States.

== Overview ==
Belzora was a thriving Port Town in Texas in the 1850s before railroads became a much more affordable way to travel. Belzora was located on the Sabine River a winding river that made it hard for steamboats to navigate. The town at its peak had several dozen businesses, post office, schoolhouse and a church. Plans were made to make the river deeper which never worked and was soon abandoned after the railroad became much more popular in the 1870s.
