= Smithfield, Texas =

Coordinates: 32°52′15″N 97°12′55″W

Smithfield is a former town in north-central Tarrant County, Texas. Located 10 miles southwest of the city of Grapevine, it was originally named Zion after the Methodist Church. A Masonic lodge and businesses existed in the city by 1876. After the donation of land for a church and cemetery, the city was renamed after donor Eli Smith who moved to the area from Missouri in 1859. Fires in 1890 and 1929 destroyed many areas of commerce in the city. However, its population remained steady through the 1930s. The city was annexed by North Richland Hills in 1958; however, Smithfield Middle School, Smithfield Elementary School and Smithfield Cemetery still carry on the name of the former town.

== See also ==
- List of ghost towns in Texas
