= Sandy Hills, Texas =

Sandy Hills was a small historic settlement which was located in western Wilson County, Texas United States, five miles west of La Vernia at the intersection of county roads 321 and 361. The settlement is now depopulated, with the sole remaining building being a small brick school house.

== See also ==
- List of ghost towns in Texas
