= Phelan, Texas =

Ghost town

Coordinates: 30°09′32″N 97°19′34″W

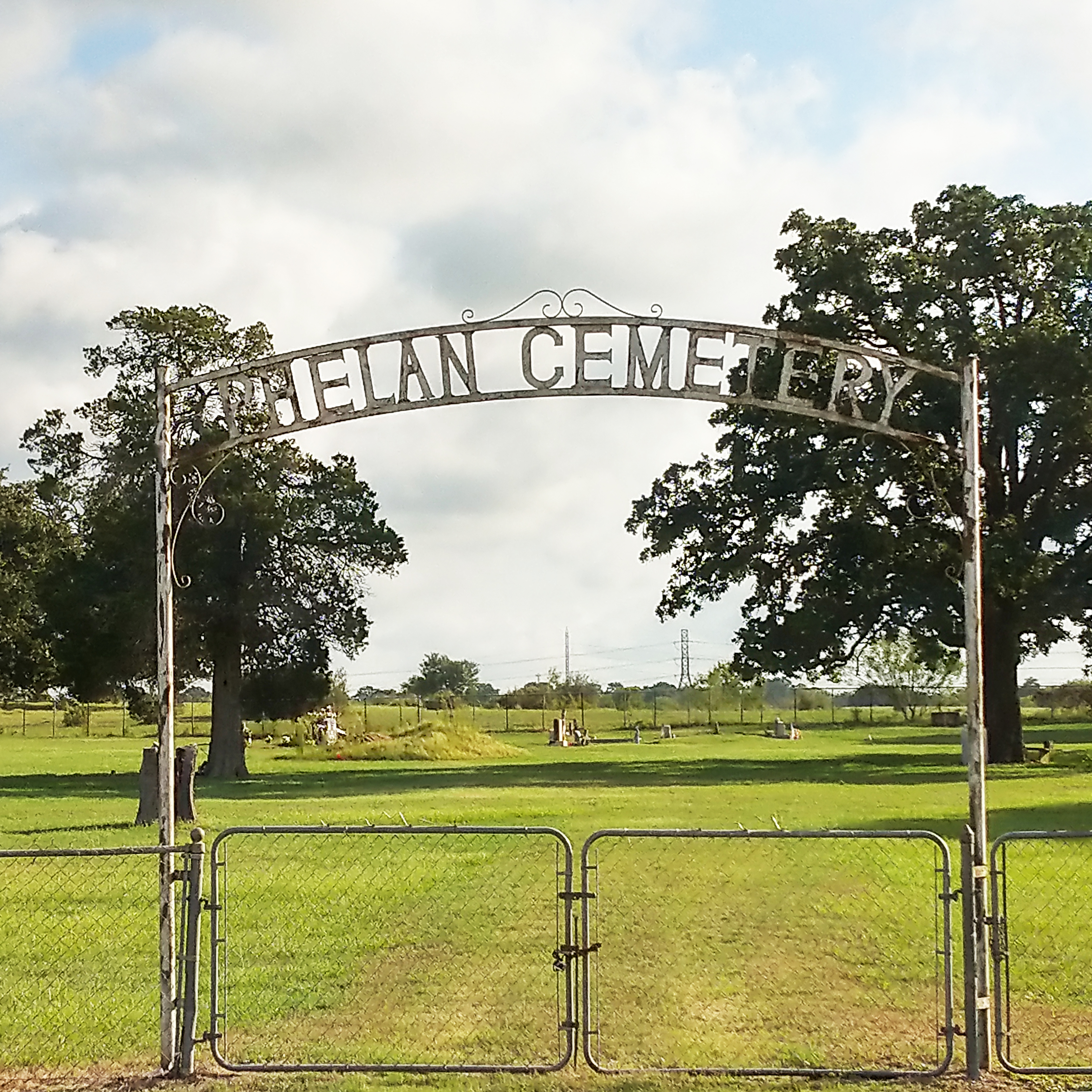
Phelan Cemetery

Phelan is a ghost town in Bastrop County, Texas, United States. It is located 2 miles (3.2 km) north of Bastrop near the intersection of Farm to Market Road 157 (Sayers Road) and Farm to Market Road 36 (Phelan Road). It is on private property.

== History ==
The town was founded in 1903, when John C. Phelan established the Independence Mining Company of Fort Worth to develop a lignite coal property in Bastrop County. The new mining community was likely named after Phelan.

In 1905, the town was granted a request for a post office. John Phelan served as one of the first postmasters. A school was constructed in 1910 for children of the mostly Mexican miners who worked at the colliery. By 1914, Phelan had a general store and a population of 800.

Although the school operated through 1933, the population had dropped to 200 by 1925, and the post office shut down in 1931. Coal mining in Bastrop County continued into the 1940s before it was abandoned.

== Today ==
The former town site reportedly holds many old foundations, an underground bank vault, and numerous dangerous mine shafts. According to an unconfirmed story, a mine collapse in the 1920s caused the death of more than 20 workers and several mules.

The Phelan Cemetery, built for the families of mine workers, is still in existence. It contains many Catholic monuments, headstones with Spanish epitaphs, and several older tombstones that no longer have inscriptions.

== See also ==
- List of ghost towns in Texas
