= Ohio, Texas =

Unincorporated community in Texas, US

Coordinates: 31°32′22″N 98°05′10″W

Ohio is an unincorporated community in Hamilton County, in the U.S. state of Texas.

== History ==
A post office called Ohio was established in 1882, and remained in operation until 1920. The community was named by settlers from Ohio who settled in the area during the early 1900s. Ohio was shown on maps until 1948. Since 1990 a few scattered houses remain in the area.
