= Spurlin, Texas =

Ghost town in Texas, US

Spurlin
- Ghost town
- Location within Texas
- Coordinates: 31.84376180°N 98.13892470°W
- Elevation: 385 m (1,263 ft)
- USGS Feature ID: 1379106

Spurlin is ghost town in Hamilton County, Texas, United States. It was as a ranching community, and received mail from Carlton, Texas. It had a church and a business by 1936, and was abandoned by the late 1980s.
