= Audubon, Texas =

Coordinates: 33.3904°N 97.6153°W

Audubon is a ghost town in Wise County, Texas. Named for the naturalist John Audubon, the town was first settled by D.D. Shirey, who plotted the town in 1865. It became an important center of commerce in the area, with a Masonic lodge from 1879 to 1886. However, it was bypassed by the Fort Worth and Denver Railway in 1883, and by 1904, the town no longer had a post office. A Texas state historical marker was erected at the former site of the town in 1970.
