= Bradshaw, Texas =

Coordinates: 32°05′55″N 99°53′52″W

Bradshaw is a town in the southern part of Taylor County, Texas. It is located on U.S. Highway 83 and Farm to Market Road 1086.

== History ==
The town was founded when the Atchison, Topeka and Santa Fe Railway was constructed near it in 1909 by residents of the nearby town of Audra who wished to reside closer to the railroad. Its population reached a peak of 450 in 1929 and slowly declined due to transportation systems better favoring the city of Abilene to the north. As of 2000, the city has a population of 61.
