= Verbena, Texas =

Ghost town in Texas, US

Verbena
- Ghost town
- Location in Texas
- Coordinates: 33.2748147°N 101.1956904°W
- Country: United States
- State: Texas
- County: Garza
- Elevation: 2,415 ft (736 m)

Verbena is a ghost town in Garza County, Texas, United States.

== History ==
Verbena is situated on Farm to Market Road 2008. It was settled in the early 1900s. A post office functioned from December 16, 1901, to December 15, 1912, and operated house of resident J. B. Cotton. The first church in Garza County, the Verbena Baptist Church, was established in the town on August 24, 1902. It's school, the Verbena School, operated from 1922 to 1945, consolidating with the Post Independent School District. The church closed by the 1950s, serving as a community center in the late 1960s; the Texas Historical Commission awarded the building with the Texas Historical Building Medallion in 1964. The community was abandoned by the 1990s.
