= Ziler, Texas =

Ghost town in Texas, US

Ziler
- Ghost town
- Location in Texas
- Coordinates: 32.2737310°N 101.4048457°W
- Country: United States
- State: Texas
- County: Howard
- Elevation: 2,480 ft (756 m)

Ziler is a ghost town in Howard County, Texas, United States.

== History ==
Ziler was situated on the property of Christopher Columbus Slaughter. It existed during the 1870s and contained a post office.
