= Wenasco, Texas =

Ghost town in Texas, US

Wenasco is a ghost town in Jasper County, Texas, United States.

== History ==
Settled in 1915, Wenasco was named for the Western Naval Stores Company. The company used the settlement as a turpentine farm, similarly with Turpentine. It had a population of 500, until being abandoned in 1919. A post office operated from 1916 to 1920.
