= Signal Hill, Texas =

Signal Hill
- Ghost town
- Interactive map of Signal Hill
- Location within Texas Signal Hill (the United States)
- Coordinates: 35°50′39″N 101°23′40″W
- Country: United States
- State: Texas
- County: Hutchinson County
- City: Stinnett
- Founder: Earl Thompson

Signal Hill is a summit and ghost town located east of Stinnett, Hutchinson County, Texas, United States, at an elevation of 3,238 feet (987 meters) above sea level.

== History ==
Signal Hill was established as an oil boom camp by Earl Thompson in 1926, and thorough the 1920s it was regarded as a place for law-breakers such as bootleggers, prostitutes, and gamblers to socialize. In 1926, several stigmatized properties were built upon the camp, such as beer emporiums, brothels, gambling dens, and speakeasies, as well as several amenities such as drugstores, filling stations, an ice house, a welding shop, a boiler shop, a hardware store, oil-supply houses, a meat market, a theater, hotels, and houses.

Signal Hill's population rapidly decreased after a cleanup of Borger city by the Texas Rangers in 1927, and the community was abandoned after a year.
