= Winkelmann, Texas =

Ghost town in Texas, US

Winkelmann
- Ghost town
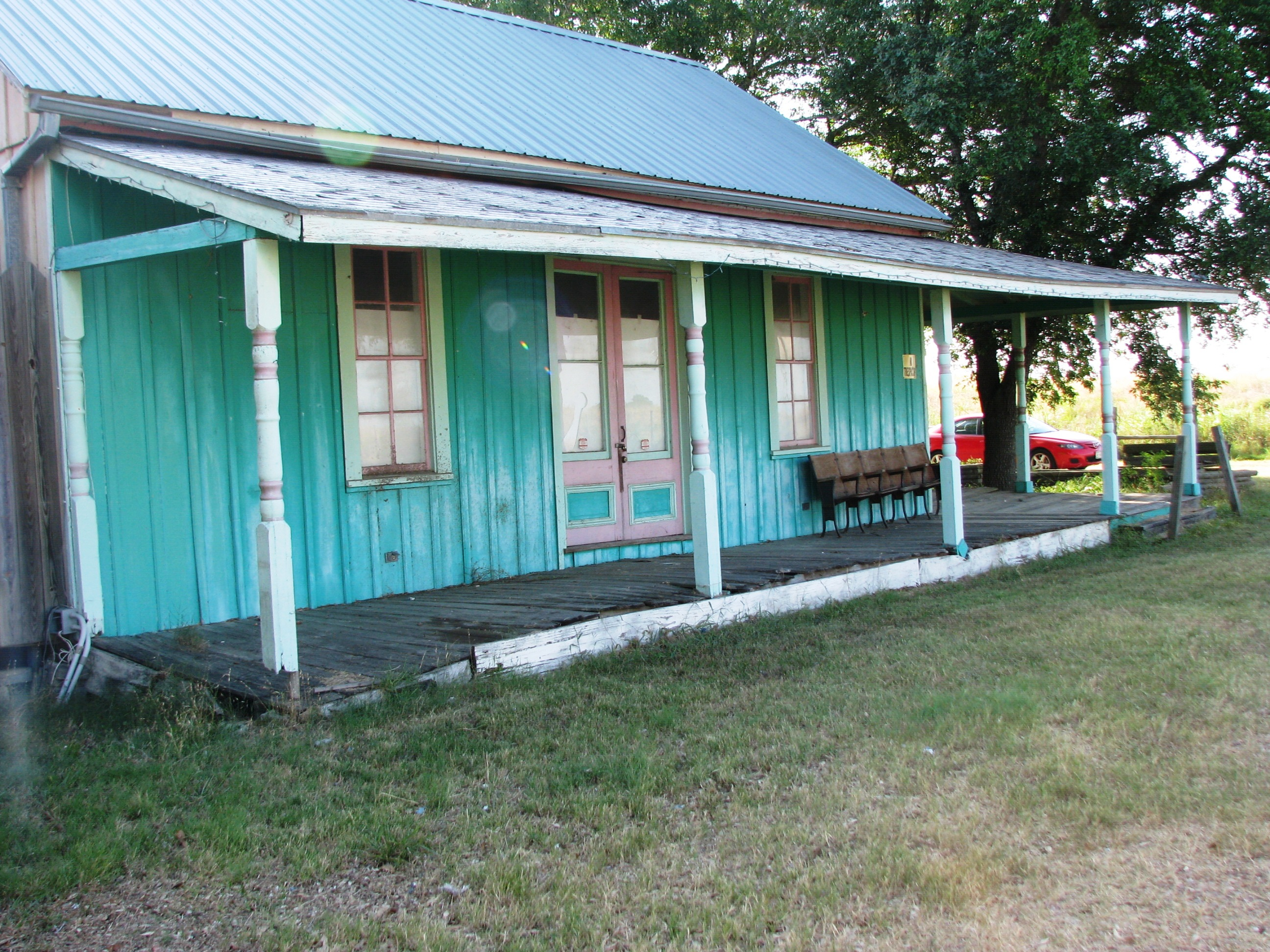
- Winkelmann in 2009
- Country: United States
- State: Texas
- County: Washington
- Named for: Ray Winkelmann

Winkelmann is a heritage tourist ghost town in Washington County, Texas, United States.

== History ==
Local developer and antiques dealer Ray Winkelmann purchased and collected about 150 historical buildings. In 1983, he purchased a five-acre plot outside of Brenham, on U.S. Route 290, and moved 19 buildings to the property. The restored structures included schoolhouses, plantation houses, a saloon, and a general store. Tourists arrived and Winkelmann operated the saloon, the general store and a restaurant, and leased other buildings to local businesses. The town became a group tour destination, with upwards of 90 people working there at its peak.

In 1986, during an economic downturn, the town was lost to the Washington County State Bank. It was auctioned in 1989, went through several ownerships, and was abandoned by 1994. In 2022, one building and a restaurant sign were left standing.
