= White City, Texas =

Ghost town in Texas, USA

White City
- Ghost town
- Location in Texas
- Coordinates: 32.8473172°N 102.2562864°W
- Country: United States
- State: Texas
- County: Gaines
- Elevation: 3,050 ft (930 m)

White City is a ghost town in Gaines County, Texas, United States.

== History ==
White City is situated near Cedar Lake. It was settled in 1939, after voters passed the sale of alcohol. A post office operated from 1940 or 1941, to the 1950s. Oilfields supported the town during the 1930s. From the 1940s, the town declined, being abandoned by the 1950s.
