= Benton City, Texas =

Ghost town in Atascosa County, Texas, United States

Benton City
- Ghost town
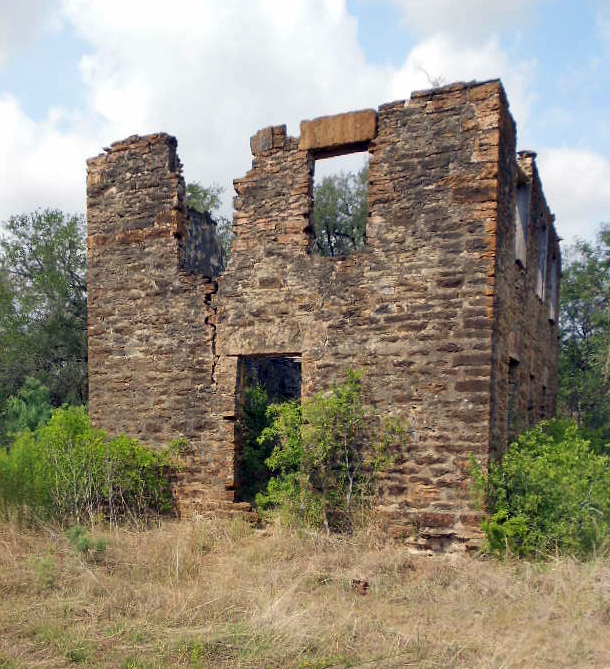
- Ruins of the Benton City Institute, February 2011

- Location within Texas
- Coordinates (School): 29°12′11″N 98°46′11″W
- Country: United States of America
- State: Texas
- County: Atascosa County
- Elevation,: 731 ft (222.8 m)
- Time zone: UTC-6 (CST)
  - Summer (DST): UTC-5 (CDT)

Benton City is a ghost town in Atascosa County, Texas, United States, sometimes also called "Benton", located on Benton City Road (FM 3175) along Atascosa Creek, 3 miles east of present-day Lytle, 27 miles southwest of San Antonio.

== History ==
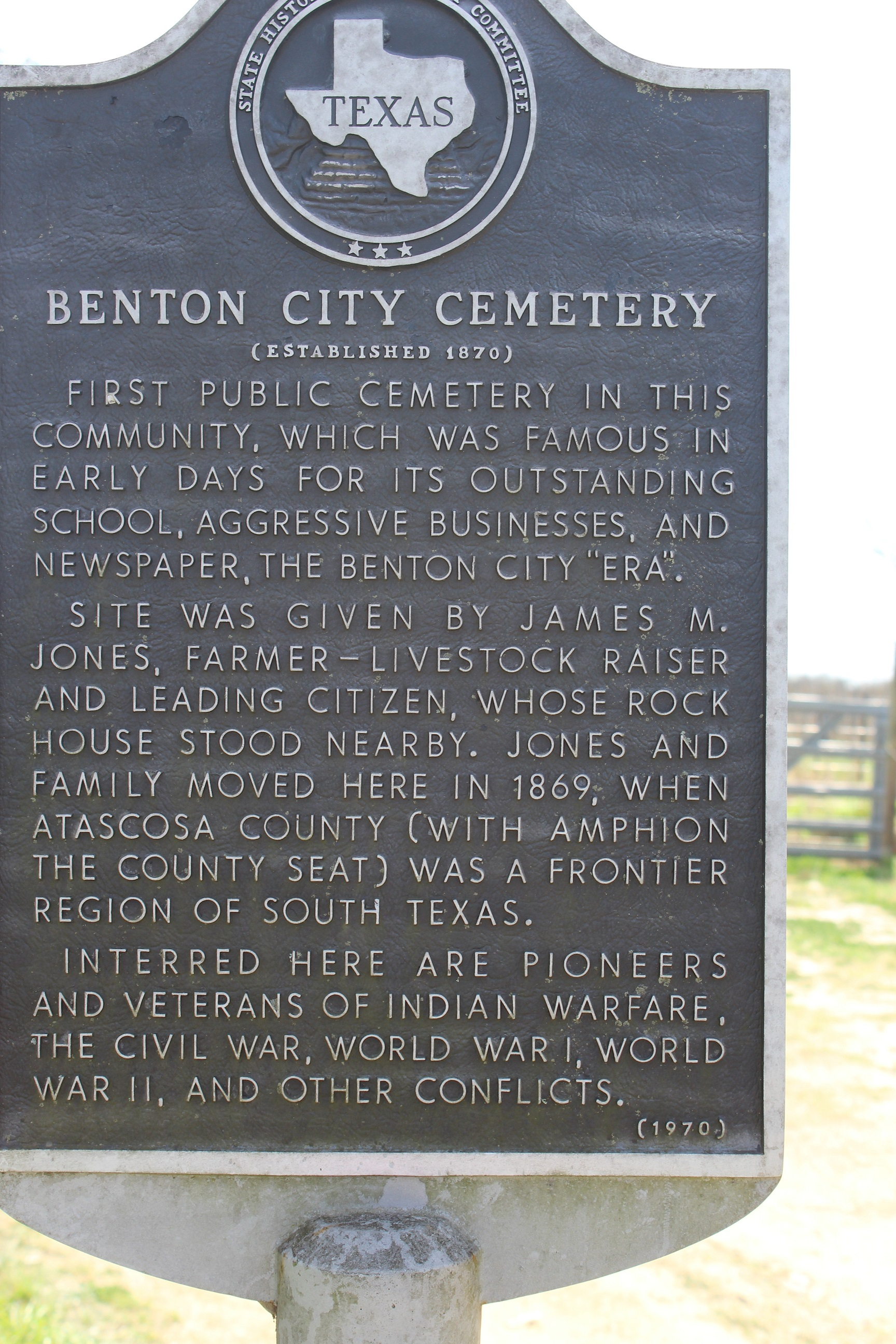
Brighton City Institute State Historic Marker, February 2016

Benton City was first settled in the 1840s on what was once known as the Old San Antonio Road. By 1880, the town had grown to include three cotton gins, a hotel, several grocery stores, a newspaper, a drug store, a blacksmith, a carpenter shop, a saddle and boot shop, a sawmill, a livery stable, several churches, a Masonic lodge, and a school. A stage line made regular stops there and delivered mail two or three times per week. The town was named either after Senator Thomas Hart Benton, or Samuel Benton, who fought in the Texas Revolution and had a son who lived in the area. With the arrival of the railroad in nearby Lytle in the 1880s, the end of the stage coach, and the consolidation of the school district with Lytle, Benton City eventually became obsolete. Its population fluctuated several times before finally disappearing.

The oldest cemetery in the area was also founded in Benton City in 1870, and remains to this day. Pioneers such as Lytle, Jones, Calk, and McDonnell rest in peace there, as well as many veterans of Indian warfare, the Civil War, and both World Wars, including a number of area residents who died during a tuberculosis outbreak that occurred in the 1800s.

=== Benton City Institute ===
Benton City Institute was an important early educational institution in the area, and its ruins are the only remaining building in town. It was built in 1875, established in 1876, and originally called the Benton City Normal Institute, operating under a Texas law distributing state funds to supplement private tuition, but owned and operated by educators. It was first run by John D. Morrison. In 1876, the top floor was bought and used by Atascosa Lodge 379, A.F. & A.M., and classes were held in the lower floor. Curricula included basic foundation courses plus accounting, law, music, and surveying. Later, the school became fully tax-supported.

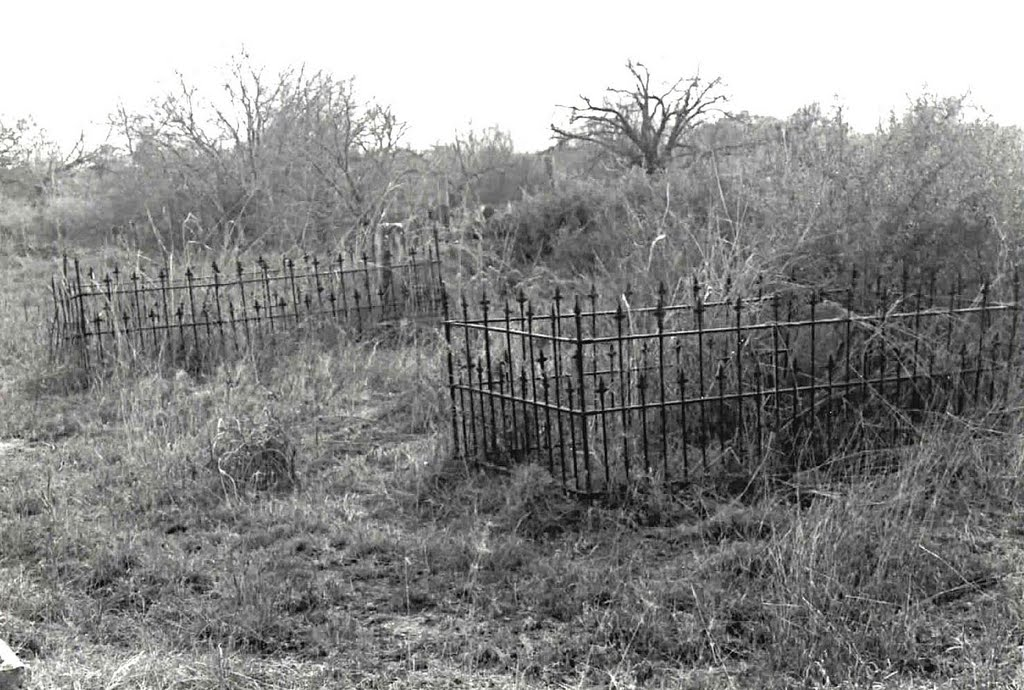
Benton City Cemetery, December 2013

By 1878, the school was coeducational, and owned and operated by Professor and Mrs. Bernard C. Hendrix of Kentucky, and in 1889, it was renamed Benton School. In 1909, the Masons relocated to nearby Lytle, and the school grew to encompass the entire building. In 1910, it was renamed Old Rock School, and had an influential career until 1919, when the school district was consolidated with nearby Lytle. The building continued to be used at times until 1934.

In 1970, the site was dedicated by the State of Texas as a historic site with a metal plaque, which has since been removed.

== See also ==
- List of ghost towns in Texas
