= Three Oaks, Texas =

Unincorporated community in Texas, US

Three Oaks
- Unincorporated community
- Location in Texas
- Coordinates: 28°58′36″N 98°10′02″W
- Country: United States
- State: Texas
- County: Wilson
- Elevation: 423 ft (129 m)

Population (2000)
  - Total: 150
- GNIS feature ID: 1380661

Three Oaks is an unincorporated community in Wilson County, Texas, United States.

== History ==
Situated on Farm to Market Road 1344, Three Oaks was settled c. 1900. At its peak, it had a school and church. Most residents left following World War II, and the population was 150 as of 2000.
