= Penick, Texas =

Ghost town in Texas, US

Penick is a ghost town in Jones County, Texas, United States. A station on the Wichita Valley Railway, it was settled in the 1880s and named for rancher R. L. Penick. It was abandoned by the 1940s.
