= Audra, Texas =

Ghost town in Taylor County, Texas

Audra is a ghost town in Taylor County, Texas. Established around the beginning of the 20th century, the town grew around a general store built by C. Meno Hunt, Fred Robinson, and Frank Sheppard. The town was named after Sheppard's daughter. In 1905, the population grew to a peak of around 75. However, in response to the construction of a railroad through the area, the town was abandoned and its residents founded the town of Bradshaw to the east.
