= Esperanza, Montgomery County, Texas =

Esperanza
- Ghost town
- Location within Texas Location within the United States
- Coordinates: 30°29′16″N 95°29′25″W
- Country: United States
- State: Texas
- County: Montgomery
- Elevation: 341 ft (104 m)
- GNIS feature ID: 1383397

Esperanza is a ghost town in Montgomery County, Texas, United States. Esperanza was located on U.S. Highway 75 near Interstate 45, 7 miles (11 km) north of Willis.

== History ==
Circa 1879, William Spiller, the proprietor of a nearby tobacco farm, founded Esperanza. When a railroad was constructed through the community, it was given the name Ada in honor of Lester Ada, who ran the general store. A post office opened in 1893 under the name Ada; its name was changed to Esperanza in 1899 by Spiller, for the Spanish word for hope. The town had a population of 100 in 1915. The post office closed at some point after 1930, and by the 1940s Esperanza had two churches, two businesses and eight houses. The Texas Historical Commission placed a historical marker at the town in the 1960s.
