= Parita Creek =

Stream in southeastern Bexar County, Texas

Coordinates: 29°15′44″N 98°17′33″W

Parita Creek is a stream in southeastern Bexar County, Texas. The stream rises near Adkins and runs southwest for ten miles before meeting Calaveras Creek near Elmendorf.

== See also ==
- List of rivers of Texas
