= Sipe Springs, Milam County, Texas =

Ghost town in Texas, United States

Sipe Springs is a ghost town in Milam County, Texas, United States, situated near Rockdale. In the early 1900s, Sipe Springs had a two-teacher school with 63 students, but the school consolidated in 1931, and soon nothing remained in the community.

== See also ==
- List of ghost towns in Texas
