= Israel, Freestone County, Texas =

Ghost town in Texas, United States

Israel, also known as Burleson or Caney, is a ghost town located in Farm Road 833, northwestern Freestone County, Texas, United States. It is located three miles (4.8 kilometres) northeast of Kirvin.

== History ==
The community was named after Israel Traweek, who is presumed to be an early settler. The community had two stores, a cotton gin, a gristmill, and a Baptist church called the Caney Baptist Church by 1858. A school called the Burleson School was established in 1891 and had 56 students as of 1893. A post office was established 1897 but was then closed in 1909. Israel had a school, a church as well as an ample amount of population in the 1930s, but only the church and a few dwellings remained in the 1960s. By the 1980s, the church remained standing.
