= Pleasant Hill, Houston County, Texas =

Ghost town

Coordinates: 31°00′32″N 94°47′52″W

Pleasant Hill, also known as Antrim, is a ghost town in Houston County, Texas, United States. It was located approximately at the intersection of County Roads 2295 and 2290.

== History ==
The town's school, one of the first in the county, was organized in 1864. After the local railroad was built, most residents moved to Grapeland, and the town was empty by 1900.

== Education ==
Any residents who live in Antrim are zoned in the Elkhart Independent School District.

== See also ==
- List of ghost towns in Texas
