= Cañada Verde, Texas =

Ghost town in Texas, US

Cañada Verde
- Ghost town
- Location in Texas
- Coordinates: 29.1921867°N 98.2761222°W
- Country: United States
- State: Texas
- County: Wilson
- Elevation: 413 ft (126 m)

Cañada Verde is a ghost town in Wilson County, Texas, United States.

== History ==
Situated on the junction of Farm to Market Roads 1303 and 3444, Cañada Verde was settled around the time of the American Civil War. A school opened in 1896, and closed following World War II. As of 2000, the population was 23.
