= Watkins, Terrell County, Texas =

Ghost town in Texas, US

Watkins
- Ghost town
- Location in Texas
- Coordinates: 29.99027780°N 101.93833330°W
- Country: United States
- State: Texas
- County: Terrell
- Elevation: 1,740 ft (530 m)

Watkins is a ghost town in Terrell County, Texas, United States.

== History ==
The area was inhabited by Native American c. 6,000 years ago. The area was later established in 1882 at a station of the Buffalo Bayou, Brazos and Colorado Railway. It is also situated near Thurston Canyon. The settlement was named for a local roadmaster who built some railways for Terrell County. In 1934, the Buffalo Bayou Railway was acquired by Texas and New Orleans Railroad, who straightened the track to bypass Watkins.
