= Turpentine, Texas =

Ghost town in Texas, US

Turpentine is a ghost town in Jasper County, Texas, United States.

== History ==
Turpentine is situated on the Burr's Ferry, Browndell and Chester Railroad, and was established as a logging community in 1907, by the Western Naval Stores Company, similarly to Wenasco. It was named for turpentine, which was farmed. The town was abandoned in 1918, most of the trees were cut by the mid-1920s, and Turpentine's post office closed in 1926.
