= Tuckertown, Texas =

Ghost town in Texas, US

Tuckertown
- Ghost town
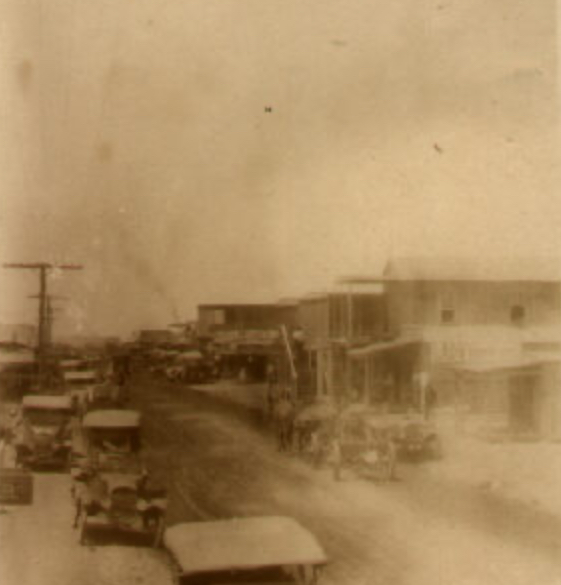
- Tuckertown, c. 1923
- Country: United States
- State: Texas
- County: Navarro

Tuckertown, or Tucker Town, is a ghost town in Navarro County, Texas, United States.

== History ==
Tuckertown was settled in early July 1923 during an oil boom. The population was 20 by 1940. Most residents moved after World War II, and it was abandoned by the mid-1960s.
