= Sipe Springs, Comanche County, Texas =

Sipe Springs, Texas
- Unincorporated community
- Location within Texas Location within the United States
- Coordinates: 32°05′27″N 98°47′03″W
- Country: United States
- State: Texas
- County: Comanche
- Elevation: 1,440 ft (440 m)
- Time zone: UTC-6 (Central (CST))
  - Summer (DST): UTC-5 (CDT)
- Area code: 325
- GNIS feature ID: 1379082

Sipe Springs (/ˈsip/, pronounced "seep") is an unincorporated community located in Comanche County, in the U.S. state of Texas. According to the Handbook of Texas, the community had a population of 75 in 2000.

== History ==
Sipe Springs also had an opera house and its own baseball team.

A horse named Royal King was owned at the time of registration by Whiteside and Albin here.

== Geography ==
Sipe Springs is located at the intersection of Farm to Market Roads 1477 and 587 on Sipe Springs Branch, 17 mi (27 km) northwest of Comanche in northwestern Comanche County. It is also located 40 mi (64 km) southwest of Stephenville and 16 mi (26 km) west of De Leon.

== Education ==
Sipe Springs' first schools were built in 1873 and 1922. In 1937 they had a combined number of 152 students and six teachers, and the schools themselves were split between the Sidney and De Leon Independent School Districts in 1952. Today, the community is served by the De Leon ISD.
