= Fort Holland, Texas =

- Ghost Town
- Nickname: Camp Holland, Texas
- Location within Texas Fort Holland, Texas (the United States)
- Coordinates: 30°32′58.2″N 104°39′38.2″W
- Country: United States
- State: Texas
- County: Presidio
- Elevation: 4,882 ft (1,488 m)
- Time zone: UTC-6 (Central (CST))
  - Summer (DST): UTC-5 (CDT)
- ZIP codes: 79843

Fort Holland (also referred to as Camp Holland) is a ghost town and former military installment in Presidio County, Texas, United States. It is located west of the city of Valentine.

== History ==
Fort Holland was built at Viejo Pass to defend against bandits led by Pancho Villa in 1918. Construction took place on the site of the last battle between United States cavalry and the Apache Indians on June 12, 1880, a skirmish won by U.S. troops. Made of stone and wood, Fort Holland's construction was at a total cost of over $16,000. The installment was closed after World War I's end in 1921, as border patrols were no longer necessary in the area.
