= Henri Castro =

American diplomat (1786–1865)

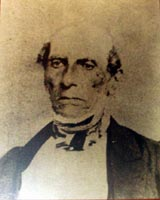
- Born: July 1786; Bayonne, France
- Died: November 3, 1865 (aged 79); Monterrey, Nuevo León, Mexico
- Resting place: St. Louis Cemetery; Castroville, Texas
- Known for: Empresario colonization of Republic of Texas
- Spouse: Amelia Mathias

Henri Castro (born Moïse Henriques Castro; July 17, 1786 – November 3, 1865), was a French diplomat who was one of the most important empresarios of the Republic of Texas.

== Early life ==
Moyze Henriques Castro was born in the town of Saint-Esprit, France to a Jewish family of Portuguese descent. His parents were Jacob Henriques Castro (1751-1807), a merchant, and Abigail Furtado (1763-1837). His uncle was Abraham Furtado, a prominent French advocate for the Jewish emancipation and a civic leader in Bordeaux.

He immigrated to the United States in the late 1810s and became an American citizen in 1827. In 1838, he worked as a banker in France and sought to secure a loan for the young Republic of Texas. He was then appointed as consul general for Texas by President Sam Houston. He recruited hundreds of families for emigration to Texas. Most came primarily from the Haut-Rhin department of Alsace in eastern France. They traveled to Texas from 1843 to 1847 and settled in the Medina River valley, just west of San Antonio. The city of Castroville on the Medina River is named for him, as is Castro County in the Texas Panhandle. Castro himself settled for a time in Castroville.

== Republic of Texas land grants ==
The Republic of Texas issued colonization land grants with individuals, conditional upon said individuals establishing settlements in a stated geographical area of Texas. The grants were limited to a given period in which colonization had to take place.

On February 15, 1842, Castro, in temporary partnership with Jean Jassaud, was issued two land grants by the Republic of Texas. The grants were for colonizing 600 families (with an option to increase that number to 1000) in three years. The first 200 families had to be settled by August 15, 1843. One grant was about 600,000 acres, near what is now Starr County, along the Rio Grande. Castro did not fulfill the colonization of this grant. The other grant totaled 1,250,000 acres west of San Antonio. It included the counties of Atascosa, Frio, La Salle, Medina, and McMullen. This second grant came to be known as Castro's Colony.

Castro began recruiting from an office in Paris in 1842, and the first of his recruits sailed into the port of Galveston, Texas, on January 1, 1843. In the fall of 1843, Castro found recruits in Alsace, Baden, and Switzerland. Waves of his colonists departed for Texas in the winter of 1843 and spring of 1844. Castro left Europe for Texas on May 19, 1844, through New Orleans. He made it to San Antonio in July 1844 to meet with the colonists and was escorted by the Texas Rangers to inspect his land grant. The first of Castro's colonists arrived at the land on September 2, 1844.

A grant covering 3,878,000 acres over 5,000 square miles went to Henry Francis Fisher and Burchard Miller. On June 7, 1842, Fisher and Miller received a colonization land grant to settle 1,000 immigrant families of German, Dutch, Swiss, Danish, Swedish, and Norwegian ancestry. The grant was issued as the Fisher–Miller Land Grant. Fisher and Miller were also unsuccessful in colonization efforts, but they were able to get their deadline extended. On June 26, 1844, they sold the grant to the Adelsverein. Henry Fisher was made part of the Verein colonial committee.

On July 3 and July 6, 1842, two land grants were issued to Alexander Bourgeois d'Orvanne and Armand Ducos for the colonization of 1,700 families along the Uvalde, Frio, and Medina Rivers. On April 7, 1844, after their colonization efforts proved fruitless, Bourgeois and Ducos sold their grant to the Adelsverein, conditional on making Alexander Bourgeois d'Orvanne the colonial director. Unfortunately, the grant had already expired, and Bourgeois could not extend the deadline for colonization.
