= Dilley =

Dilley may refer to:

Places in the United States

- Dilley, Oregon, an unincorporated community
- Dilley, Texas, a city
  - Dilley Independent School District
  - Dilley High School
- Dilleys Mill, West Virginia
- Dilley House, a historic house in Pine Bluff, Arkansas
- MacMillan-Dilley House, a historic house in Pine Bluff, Arkansas

Other

- Dilley (surname)
- Billy Dilley's Super-Duper Subterranean Summer, an American animated TV series
