= Pearsall =

Pearsall may refer to:

- Pearsall (surname)
- Pearsall, Texas, an American city
- Pearsall, Western Australia, an Australian suburb

== See also ==
- West Pearsall, Texas
- Fort Pearsall, an 18th-century fort in Romney, West Virginia
