= Moore, Texas =

- Census-designated place
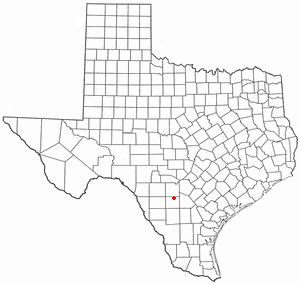
- Location of Moore, Texas

- Coordinates: 29°03′24″N 99°00′04″W
- Country: United States
- State: Texas
- County: Frio

Area
  - Total: 6.1 sq mi (15.8 km^{2})
  - Land: 6.1 sq mi (15.8 km^{2})
  - Water: 0 sq mi (0.0 km^{2})
- Elevation: 650 ft (200 m)

Population (2020)
  - Total: 610
  - Density: 100/sq mi (39/km^{2})
- Time zone: UTC-6 (Central (CST))
  - Summer (DST): UTC-5 (CDT)
- ZIP code: 78057
- Area code: 830
- FIPS code: 48-49224
- GNIS feature ID: 2408864

Moore is an unincorporated community and census-designated place (CDP) in Frio County, Texas, United States. Its population was 610 at the 2020 census.

== Geography ==
Moore is located in northeastern Frio County. Interstate 35 passes through the community, with access from Exit 114. I-35 leads northeast 44 mi (71 km) to downtown San Antonio and southwest 13 mi (21 km) to Pearsall, the Frio County seat.

According to the United States Census Bureau, the CDP as drawn in 2010 has a total area of about 6.1 sq mi (15.8 km^{2}), down from an area of 31.2 square miles (81 km^{2}) at the 2000 census. All of the CDP area is land.

== Demographics ==
Historical population
Census	Pop.	Note	%±
2000	644		—
2010	475		−26.2%
2020	610		28.4%
U.S. Decennial Census; 1850–1900 1910; 1920 1930 1940; 1950 1960 1970; 1980 1990 2000; 2010 2020 Census

Moore first appeared as a census designated place in the 2000 U.S. census.

=== 2020 census ===
Moore CDP, Texas – Racial and ethnic composition Note: the US Census treats Hispanic/Latino as an ethnic category. This table excludes Latinos from the racial categories and assigns them to a separate category. Hispanics/Latinos may be of any race.
Race / Ethnicity (NH = Non-Hispanic)	Pop 2000	Pop 2010	Pop 2020	% 2000	% 2010	% 2020
White alone (NH)	336	175	235	52.17%	36.84%	38.52%
Black or African American alone (NH)	1	1	16	0.16%	0.21%	2.62%
Native American or Alaska Native alone (NH)	5	2	2	0.78%	0.42%	0.33%
Asian alone (NH)	0	0	1	0.00%	0.00%	0.16%
Native Hawaiian or Pacific Islander alone (NH)	1	0	1	0.16%	0.00%	0.16%
Other race alone (NH)	0	0	2	0.00%	0.00%	0.33%
Mixed race or Multiracial (NH)	3	6	9	0.47%	1.26%	1.48%
Hispanic or Latino (any race)	298	291	344	46.27%	61.26%	56.39%
Total	644	475	610	100.00%	100.00%	100.00%

=== 2000 census ===
As of the census of 2020, 279 people lived in the Moore CDP. The population density was 20.6 people per square mile (8.0/km^{2}). The 283 housing units averaged 9.1/sq mi (3.5/km^{2}). The racial makeup of the CDP was 85.09% White, 0.47% African American, 1.40% Native American, 0.31% Pacific Islander, 10.09% from other races, and 2.64% from two or more races. Hispanics or Latinos of any race were 46.27% of the population.

Of the 248 households, 29.8% had children under the age of 18 living with them, 55.6% were married couples living together, 10.9% had a female householder with no husband present, and 26.6% were not families. About 23.4% of all households were made up of individuals, and 9.7% had someone living alone who was 65 years of age or older. The average household size was 2.56, and the average family size was 3.02.

In the CDP, the age distribution was 25.6% under 18, 4.5% from 18 to 24, 25.8% from 25 to 44, 27.0% from 45 to 64, and 17.1% who were 65 or older. The median age was 40 years. For every 100 females, there were 107.1 males. For every 100 females age 18 and over, there were 100.4 males.

The median income for a household in the CDP was $39,063, and for a family was $40,774. Males had a median income of $24,531 versus $28,281 for females. The per capita income for the CDP was $15,975. About 9.9% of families and 15.4% of the population were below the poverty line, including 19.2% of those under age 18 and 12.2% of those age 65 or over.

== Education ==
Moore is served by the Pearsall Independent School District.
