= National Register of Historic Places listings in Frio County, Texas =

Location of Frio County in Texas

This is a list of the National Register of Historic Places listings in Frio County, Texas.

This is intended to be a complete list of properties listed on the National Register of Historic Places in Frio County, Texas. There is one property listed on the National Register in the county. This property is also a State Antiquities Landmark and a Recorded Texas Historic Landmark.

This National Park Service list is complete through NPS recent listings posted March 21, 2025.

== Current listings ==
The locations of National Register properties may be seen in a mapping service provided.

| | Name on the Register | Image | Date listed | Location | City or town | Description |
|---|---|---|---|---|---|---|
| 1 | Old Frio County Jail | Old Frio County Jail | November 19, 1979 (#79002941) | E. Medina and S. Pecan Sts. 28°53′16″N 99°05′35″W | Pearsall | State Antiquities Landmark, Recorded Texas Historic Landmark; presently Frio Pioneer Jail Museum |

== See also ==
- National Register of Historic Places listings in Texas
- Recorded Texas Historic Landmarks in Frio County
