= North Pearsall, Texas =

Census-designated place in Frio County, Texas, United States

- Census-designated place
- Coordinates: 28°55′18″N 99°05′42″W
- Country: United States
- State: Texas
- County: Frio

Area
  - Total: 1.52 sq mi (3.93 km^{2})
  - Land: 1.52 sq mi (3.93 km^{2})
  - Water: 0 sq mi (0.0 km^{2})
- Elevation: 650 ft (200 m)

Population (2020)
  - Total: 739
  - Density: 487/sq mi (188/km^{2})
- Time zone: UTC-6 (Central (CST))
  - Summer (DST): UTC-5 (CDT)
- FIPS code: 48-52302
- GNIS feature ID: 2408945

North Pearsall is a census-designated place (CDP) in Frio County, Texas, United States. The population was 739 at the 2020 census.

== Geography ==
North Pearsall is located in central Frio County and is bordered to the south by the city of Pearsall, the county seat. Interstate 35 forms the western edge of the CDP, with access from Exit 104.

According to the United States Census Bureau, the CDP has a total area of 1.5 square miles (3.9 km^{2}), all land.

== Demographics ==
Historical population
| Census | Pop. | Note | %± |
|---|---|---|---|
| 2000 | 561 | | — |
| 2010 | 614 | | 9.4% |
| 2020 | 739 | | 20.4% |
U.S. Decennial Census; 1850–1900 1910; 1920 1930 1940; 1950 1960 1970; 1980 1990 2000; 2010 2020

North Pearsall first appeared as a census designated place in the 2000 U.S. census.

=== 2020 census ===
North Pearsall CDP, Texas – Racial and ethnic composition Note: the US Census treats Hispanic/Latino as an ethnic category. This table excludes Latinos from the racial categories and assigns them to a separate category. Hispanics/Latinos may be of any race.
| Race / Ethnicity (NH = Non-Hispanic) | Pop 2000 | Pop 2010 | Pop 2020 | % 2000 | % 2010 | % 2020 |
|---|---|---|---|---|---|---|
| White alone (NH) | 99 | 95 | 105 | 17.65% | 15.47% | 14.21% |
| Black or African American alone (NH) | 0 | 2 | 0 | 0.00% | 0.33% | 0.00% |
| Native American or Alaska Native alone (NH) | 1 | 0 | 6 | 0.18% | 0.00% | 0.81% |
| Asian alone (NH) | 0 | 0 | 0 | 0.00% | 0.00% | 0.00% |
| Native Hawaiian or Pacific Islander alone (NH) | 0 | 0 | 0 | 0.00% | 0.00% | 0.00% |
| Other race alone (NH) | 0 | 0 | 0 | 0.00% | 0.00% | 0.00% |
| Mixed race or Multiracial (NH) | 1 | 0 | 2 | 0.18% | 0.00% | 0.27% |
| Hispanic or Latino (any race) | 460 | 517 | 626 | 82.00% | 84.20% | 84.71% |
| Total | 561 | 614 | 739 | 100.00% | 100.00% | 100.00% |

=== 2000 census ===
As of the census of 2000, 561 people, 162 households, and 139 families were residing in the CDP. The population density was 420.3 people per mi^{2} (162.9/km^{2}). The 176 housing units averaged 131.9/sq mi (51.1/km^{2}). The racial makeup of the CDP was 72.55% White, 1.25% Native American, 24.42% from other races, and 1.78% from two or more races. Hispanics or Latinos of any race were 82.00% of the population.

Of the 162 households, 58.0% had children under the age of 18 living with them, 68.5% were married couples living together, 10.5% had a female householder with no husband present, and 13.6% were not families. About 10.5% of all households were made up of individuals, and 4.9% had someone living alone who was 65 years of age or older. The average household size was 3.46, and the average family size was 3.73.

In the CDP, the age distribution was 37.4% under 18, 9.6% from 18 to 24, 30.3% from 25 to 44, 18.9% from 45 to 64, and 3.7% who were 65 or older. The median age was 27 years. For every 100 females, there were 94.1 males. For every 100 females age 18 and over, there were 101.7 males.

The median income for a household in the CDP was $32,917, and for a family, $35,000. Males had a median income of $26,667 versus $17,167 for females. The per capita income for the CDP was $11,602. About 8.3% of families and 8.1% of the population were below the poverty line, including 8.7% of those under age 18 and 11.3% of those age 65 or over.

== Education ==
North Pearsall is served by the Pearsall Independent School District.

== See also ==
- List of census-designated places in Texas
