= Mary Moore (mayor) =

Former mayor of Pearsall, Texas

Mary Moore is a former mayor of Pearsall, Texas. Moore was the first woman as well as the first African American to be elected Mayor of Pearsall.

== Elections ==
On May 9, 2015, Moore became the first African American woman to be elected Mayor of Pearsall, Texas, US with 66% of the vote. Her campaign was centered on bringing change to a corrupt city government that had been overwhelmed with lawsuits and grand jury indictments of its officials. She said that there was a "history of dysfunction at City Hall" and that she would run under the banner of "Honest Leadership".

Moore was re-elected in 2017.

In 2022 she stood for Frio County judge.

== Covid ==
During the COVID-19 pandemic Moore issued an executive order on June 12, 2020, declaring a state of local disaster.

== Personal life ==
Moore was born November 17, 1957, in Bonita, Louisiana, the daughter of Thomas and Annie Lumpkin, and grew up on a cotton farm. Before becoming Mayor of Pearsall, Moore was a physician assistant for 15 years. She is a mother of two, and a grandmother of two.

== Education ==
Moore holds a Bachelor of Science in physician assistant studies from the University of Texas Medical Branch at Galveston Texas.
