= West Pearsall, Texas =

- CDP
- Location within the state of Texas
- Coordinates: 28°53′52″N 99°6′29″W
- Country: United States
- State: Texas
- County: Frio

Area
  - Total: 0.077 sq mi (0.2 km^{2})
  - Land: 0.077 sq mi (0.2 km^{2})
  - Water: 0 sq mi (0.0 km^{2})
- Elevation: 617 ft (188 m)

Population (2000)
  - Total: 349
  - Density: 4,554/sq mi (1,758.2/km^{2})
- Time zone: UTC-6 (Central (CST))
  - Summer (DST): UTC-5 (CDT)
- FIPS code: 48-77818
- GNIS feature ID: 1852782

West Pearsall was a census-designated place (CDP) in Frio County, Texas, United States. The population was 349 at the 2000 census.

West Pearsall was annexed into the City of Pearsall in late 2002.

== Geography ==
West Pearsall is located at 28°53′52″N 99°6′29″W (28.897874, - 99.107938).

According to the United States Census Bureau, the CDP had a total area of 0.1 square miles (0.26 km^{2}), all of it land.

== Demographics ==
As of the census of 2000, there were 349 people, 107 households, and 89 families residing in the CDP. The population density was 4,553.6 inhabitants per square mile (1,758.2/km^{2}). There were 127 housing units at an average density of 1,657.0 per square mile (639.8/km^{2}). The racial makeup of the CDP was 67.05% White, 0.29% African American, 29.23% from other races, and 3.44% from two or more races. Hispanic or Latino of any race were 99.71% of the population.

There were 107 households, out of which 40.2% had children under the age of 18 living with them, 54.2% were married couples living together, 20.6% had a female householder with no husband present, and 16.8% were non-families. 13.1% of all households were made up of individuals, and 5.6% had someone living alone who was 65 years of age or older. The average household size was 3.26 and the average family size was 3.54.

In the CDP, the population was spread out, with 34.7% under the age of 18, 9.7% from 18 to 24, 28.4% from 25 to 44, 16.6% from 45 to 64, and 10.6% who were 65 years of age or older. The median age was 29 years. For every 100 females, there were 106.5 males. For every 100 females age 18 and over, there were 100.0 males.

The median income for a household in the CDP was $26,000, and the median income for a family was $26,550. Males had a median income of $14,205 versus $12,917 for females. The per capita income for the CDP was $8,168. About 11.3% of families and 7.9% of the population were below the poverty line, including none of those under age 18 and 38.2% of those age 65 or over.

== Education ==
West Pearsall is served by the Pearsall Independent School District.
