= South Texas Detention Facility =

Immigrant detention center in Texas, United States

South Texas ICE Processing Center
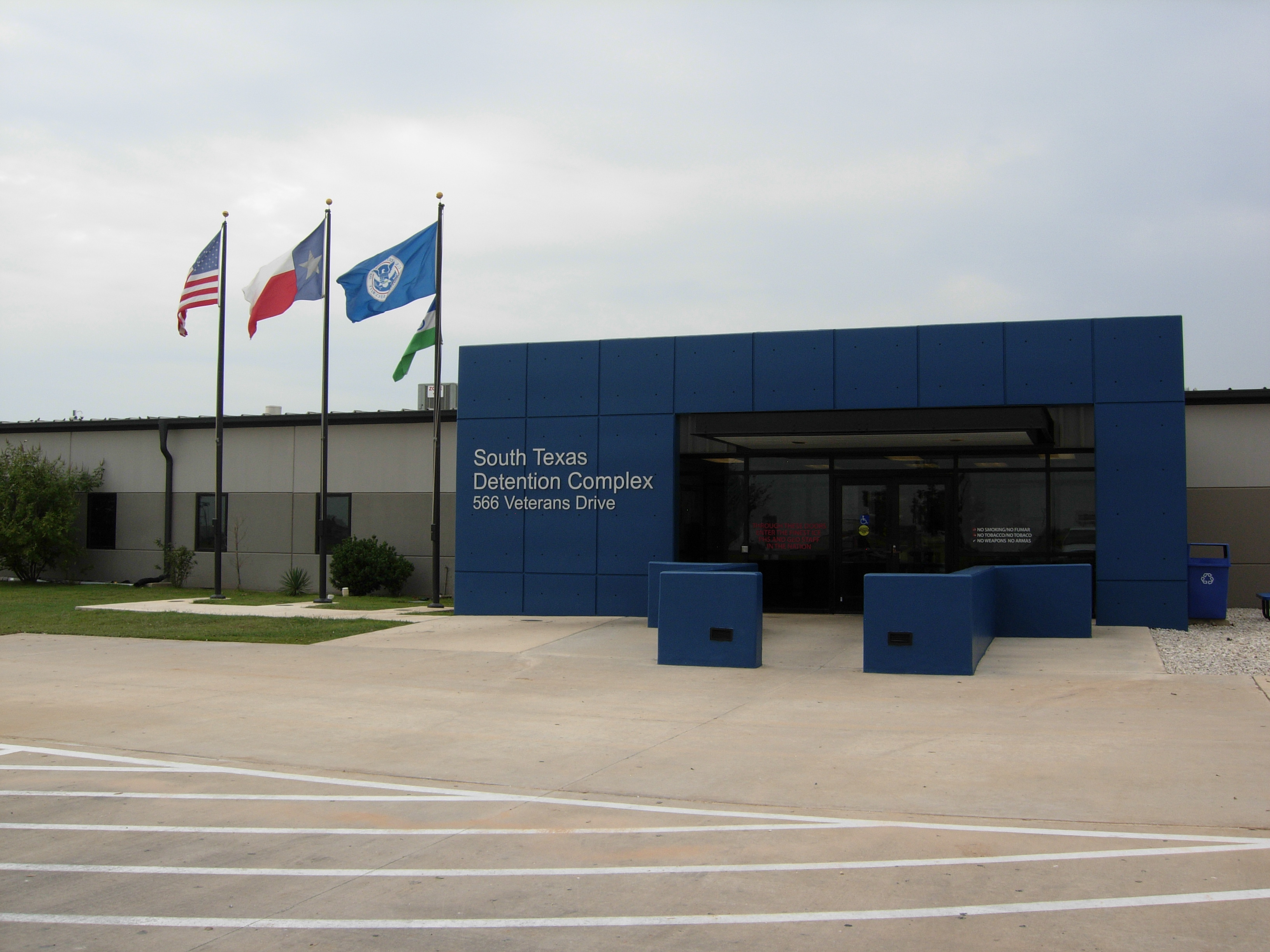
- Interactive map of South Texas ICE Processing Center
- Location: 566 Veteran Drive Pearsall, Texas, Frio County United States, 78061; 28.894301°N 99.120929°W
- Status: Operational
- Security class: Mixed Security
- Capacity: 1904
- Opened: May 2005
- Managed by: GEO Group
- Warden: Bobby Thompson

The South Texas ICE Processing Center is a privately operated detention facility located in Pearsall, Frio County, Texas, run by the GEO Group to house detainees for the U.S. Immigration and Customs Enforcement.

The facility holds a maximum of 1904 detainees, male and female, at a mix of security levels. The facility first opened in May 2005 as the "Pearsall Immigration Detention Center" by the Correctional Services Corporation, which was bought by the GEO Group later that year.

A 2015 report from watchdog organizations, Detention Watch Network and the Center for Constitutional Rights, showed that contracts between ICE and five detention facilities in Texas obligated ICE to pay for daily minimum populations. Detention Watch Network says this incentivized ICE to fill the center up to the minimum, effectively creating a quota system. The nightly minimum for this facility was 725, which was regularly exceeded.

== See also ==
- List of detention sites in the United States
