= Derby, Texas =

Derby
- Unincorporated community
- Location within Texas Location within the United States
- Coordinates: 28°46′17″N 99°07′43″W
- Country: United States
- State: Texas
- County: Frio
- Elevation: 522 ft (159 m)

Population (2000)
  - Total: 50
- Time zone: Central (CST)
- ZIP: 78061
- Area code: 830
- GNIS feature ID: 1379655

Derby is an unincorporated community located in south-central Frio County in the U.S. state of Texas. The town is located on the former Missouri Pacific Railroad (now the Union Pacific Railroad), at the intersection of I-35 and FM 1583.

== History ==
The town was formed in 1879 by John Bennett. In 1882, a post office was established under the name of Lenore, with the town later being renamed to Derby, after Bennett's hometown of Derby, England. Derby was renamed to Otley, after the village of Otley, Suffolk. By 1906, the town was renamed to Derby. In 2009, the population of Derby was estimated to be 50.

== Education ==
The town is served by the Pearsall Independent School District.
