= Dilley High School =

Location
- 1 Grey Wolf Drive; Dilley, Texas 78017-3503; United States
- Coordinates: 28.6754°N 99.1727°W

Information
- School type: Public high school
- School district: Dilley Independent School District
- Principal: Mark Tribett
- Grades: 9-12
- Enrollment: 266 (2023-2024)
- Colors: Maroon & Gray
- Athletics conference: UIL Class 3A
- Mascot: Wolf
- Yearbook: Wolf Den
- Website: Dilley High School

Dilley High School is a public high school located in the city of Dilley, Texas, United States and classified as a 3A school by the UIL. It is a part of the Dilley Independent School District located in south central Frio County. In 2015, the school was rated "Met Standard" by the Texas Education Agency.

== Athletics ==
The Dilley Wolves compete in these sports -

Volleyball, Cross Country, Football, Basketball, Powerlifting, Golf, Tennis, Track, Baseball & Softball

=== State Titles ===
- Boys Cross Country -
  - 1997(2A)
- Boys Track and Field -
  - 2024(3A)
