= Pearsall (surname) =

Pearsall is a surname. Notable people with the surname include:

- Alan Pearsall (1915–1944), Australian sportsman
- Aleck Pearsall, 19th-century American baseball player
- A. W. H. Pearsall (1925–2006), English historian
- Benjamin Pearsall (1878–1951), Australian politician
- Deborah M. Pearsall (born 1950), American archaeologist
- Derek Pearsall (1931–2021), medievalist and Chaucer scholar
- Duane D. Pearsall (1922–2010), American entrepreneur
- Geoff Pearsall (born 1946), Australian politician
- Jack Pearsall (1915–1982), Canadian politician
- Kenneth H. Pearsall (1918–1999), American clergyman, president of Northwest Nazarene College
- Phyllis Pearsall (1906–1996), British painter and writer
- Richard Pearsall (1698–1762), English Congregationalist minister
- Ricky Pearsall (born 2000), American football player
- Robert Pearsall (architect) (1852–1929), English architect
- Robert Lucas de Pearsall (1795–1856), English composer
- Ronald Pearsall (1927–2005), English author
- Stacy Pearsall (born 1980), American photographer and U.S. Air Force veteran
- Thomas Pearsall (Australian politician) (1920–2003), Australian politician
- Thomas Pearsall (cricketer) (born 1943), English cricketer
- Thomas J. Pearsall (1903–1981), American politician and philanthropist
- Will Pearsall (born 1995), Australian rugby league footballer
- William Harold Pearsall (1891–1964), Botanist

== See also ==
- Wally Fawkes (1924–2023), born Walter Ernest Pearsall, Canadian-British cartoonist and clarinettist
- Alys Pearsall Smith, first wife of Bertrand Russell
- Logan Pearsall Smith, American essayist
- Robert Pearsall Smith, lay leader in the Holiness Movement in Great Britain
- Pearson (surname)
