= Dilley, Texas =

- Town
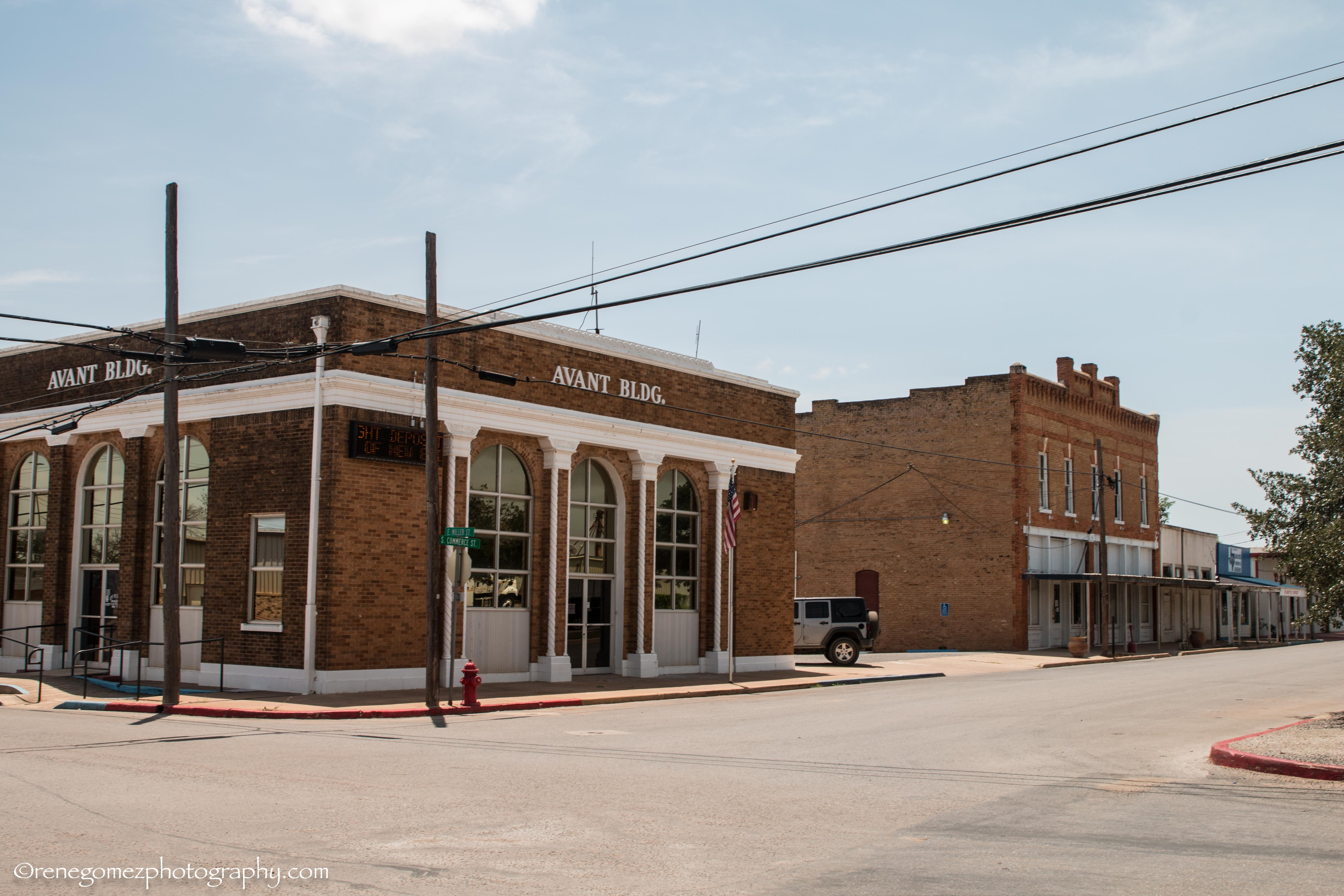
- Police Station in Dilley, Texas
- Motto: "A slice of the good life"
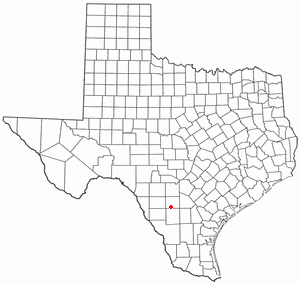
- Location of Dilley, Texas

- Coordinates: 28°40′03″N 99°10′35″W
- Country: United States
- State: Texas
- County: Frio

Government
  - Type: Mayor-council government

Area
  - Total: 2.33 sq mi (6.04 km^{2})
  - Land: 2.33 sq mi (6.04 km^{2})
  - Water: 0 sq mi (0.00 km^{2})
- Elevation: 561 ft (171 m)

Population (2020)
  - Total: 3,274
  - Density: 1,400/sq mi (542/km^{2})
- Time zone: UTC-6 (Central (CST))
  - Summer (DST): UTC-5 (CDT)
- ZIP code: 78017
- Area code: 830
- FIPS code: 48-20428
- GNIS feature ID: 2410339
- Website: www.cityofdilleytx.com

Dilley is a town in Frio County, Texas, United States. The population was 3,274 at the 2020 census. It is located off Interstate 35, south of the county seat in Pearsall.

== Geography ==
Dilley is located in southern Frio County. Interstate 35 bypasses the city on the west, with access from Exits 82 through 86. I-35 leads northeastward 71 miles (114 km) to San Antonio and southward 83 miles (134 km) to Laredo. Pearsall, the county seat, is 16 miles (26 km) to the north. Texas State Highway 85 passes through the center of town as Leona Street, leading northeast 49 miles (79 km) to Pleasanton and west 58 miles (93 km) to Carrizo Springs.

According to the United States Census Bureau, Dilley has a total area of 2.4 square miles (6.1 km^{2}), all land.

=== Climate ===
Climate data for Dilley, Texas (1991–2020)
Month	Jan	Feb	Mar	Apr	May	Jun	Jul	Aug	Sep	Oct	Nov	Dec	Year
Mean daily maximum °F (°C)	65.7 (18.7)	70.4 (21.3)	76.9 (24.9)	84.4 (29.1)	90.2 (32.3)	95.5 (35.3)	97.0 (36.1)	97.8 (36.6)	91.7 (33.2)	84.5 (29.2)	73.3 (22.9)	66.3 (19.1)	82.8 (28.2)
Daily mean °F (°C)	53.7 (12.1)	58.0 (14.4)	64.8 (18.2)	71.7 (22.1)	78.7 (25.9)	83.8 (28.8)	85.4 (29.7)	85.9 (29.9)	80.6 (27.0)	72.6 (22.6)	62.1 (16.7)	54.6 (12.6)	71.0 (21.7)
Mean daily minimum °F (°C)	41.7 (5.4)	45.7 (7.6)	52.7 (11.5)	59.1 (15.1)	67.2 (19.6)	72.1 (22.3)	73.8 (23.2)	74.0 (23.3)	69.5 (20.8)	60.6 (15.9)	51.0 (10.6)	42.8 (6.0)	59.2 (15.1)
Average precipitation inches (mm)	1.15 (29)	1.24 (31)	1.98 (50)	1.47 (37)	4.02 (102)	2.46 (62)	2.22 (56)	1.96 (50)	3.70 (94)	2.16 (55)	1.42 (36)	1.23 (31)	25.01 (633)
Average snowfall inches (cm)	0.0 (0.0)	0.0 (0.0)	0.0 (0.0)	0.0 (0.0)	0.0 (0.0)	0.0 (0.0)	0.0 (0.0)	0.0 (0.0)	0.0 (0.0)	0.0 (0.0)	0.0 (0.0)	0.2 (0.51)	0.2 (0.51)
Source: NOAA

== Demographics ==
Historical population
Census	Pop.	Note	%±
1930	929		—
1940	1,244		33.9%
1950	1,809		45.4%
1960	2,118		17.1%
1970	2,362		11.5%
1980	2,579		9.2%
1990	2,632		2.1%
2000	3,674		39.6%
2010	3,894		6.0%
2020	3,274		−15.9%
U.S. Decennial Census

=== 2020 census ===
Dilley racial composition (NH = Non-Hispanic) (Note: Note: the US Census treats Hispanic/Latino as an ethnic category. This table excludes Latinos from the racial categories and assigns them to a separate category. Hispanics/Latinos can be of any race.)
Race	Number	Percentage
White (NH)	383	11.7%
Black or African American (NH)	181	5.53%
Native American or Alaska Native (NH)	3	0.09%
Asian (NH)	9	0.27%
Some Other Race (NH)	18	0.55%
Mixed/Multi-Racial (NH)	15	0.46%
Hispanic or Latino	2,665	81.4%
Total	3,274	

As of the 2020 United States census, there were 3,274 people, 886 households, and 585 families residing in the city.

=== 2000 census ===
As of the census of 2000, there were 3,674 people, 955 households, and 727 families residing in the city. The population density was 1,574.3 inhabitants per square mile (607.8/km^{2}). There were 1,158 housing units at an average density of 496.2 per square mile (191.6/km^{2}). The racial makeup of the city was 66.93% White, 10.40% African American, 0.57% Native American, 0.76% Asian, 18.81% from other races, and 2.53% from two or more races. Hispanic or Latino of any race were 72.24% of the population.

There were 955 households, out of which 42.1% had children under the age of 18 living with them, 49.7% were married couples living together, 20.0% had a female householder with no husband present, and 23.8% were non-families. 21.9% of all households were made up of individuals, and 9.2% had someone living alone who was 65 years of age or older. The average household size was 3.00 and the average family size was 3.47.

In the city, the population was spread out, with 27.9% under the age of 18, 13.0% from 18 to 24, 35.5% from 25 to 44, 14.9% from 45 to 64, and 8.8% who were 65 years of age or older. The median age was 29 years. For every 100 females, there were 145.8 males. For every 100 females age 18 and over, there were 166.9 males.

The median income for a household in the city was $19,540, and the median income for a family was $22,021. Males had a median income of $26,825 versus $13,229 for females. The per capita income for the city was $20,475. About 32.6% of families and 35.8% of the population were below the poverty line, including 42.5% of those under age 18 and 31.3% of those age 65 or over.

== Education ==
The city is served by the Dilley Independent School District. The Dilley Independent School District has three schools: Dilley Elementary, Mary Harper Middle School, and Dilley High School.

== Dilley ICE Detention Center ==
There is an ICE Detention Center in Dilley, the South Texas Family Residential Center.

== Gallery ==
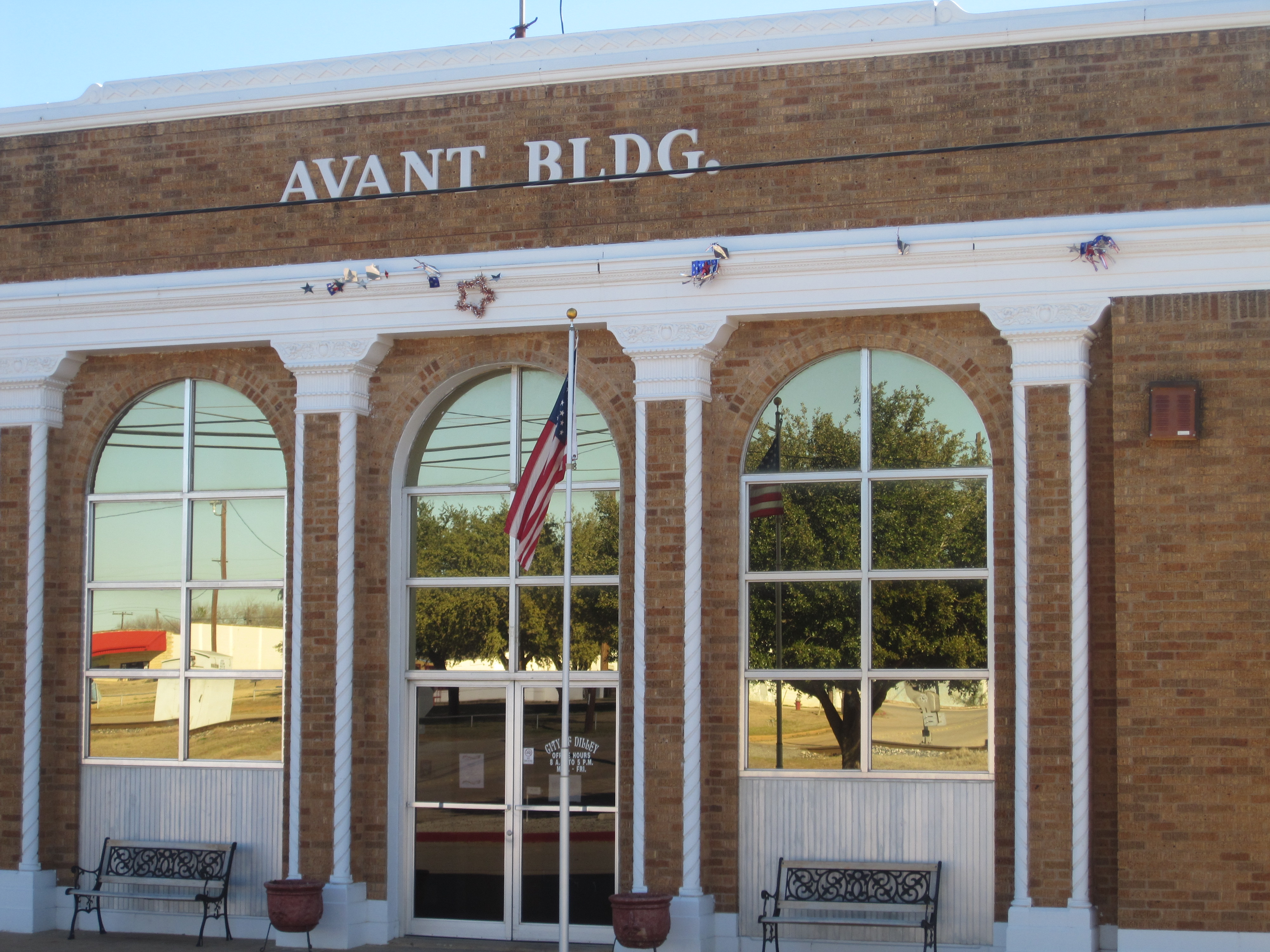
City Hall in Dilley is in the Avant Building.

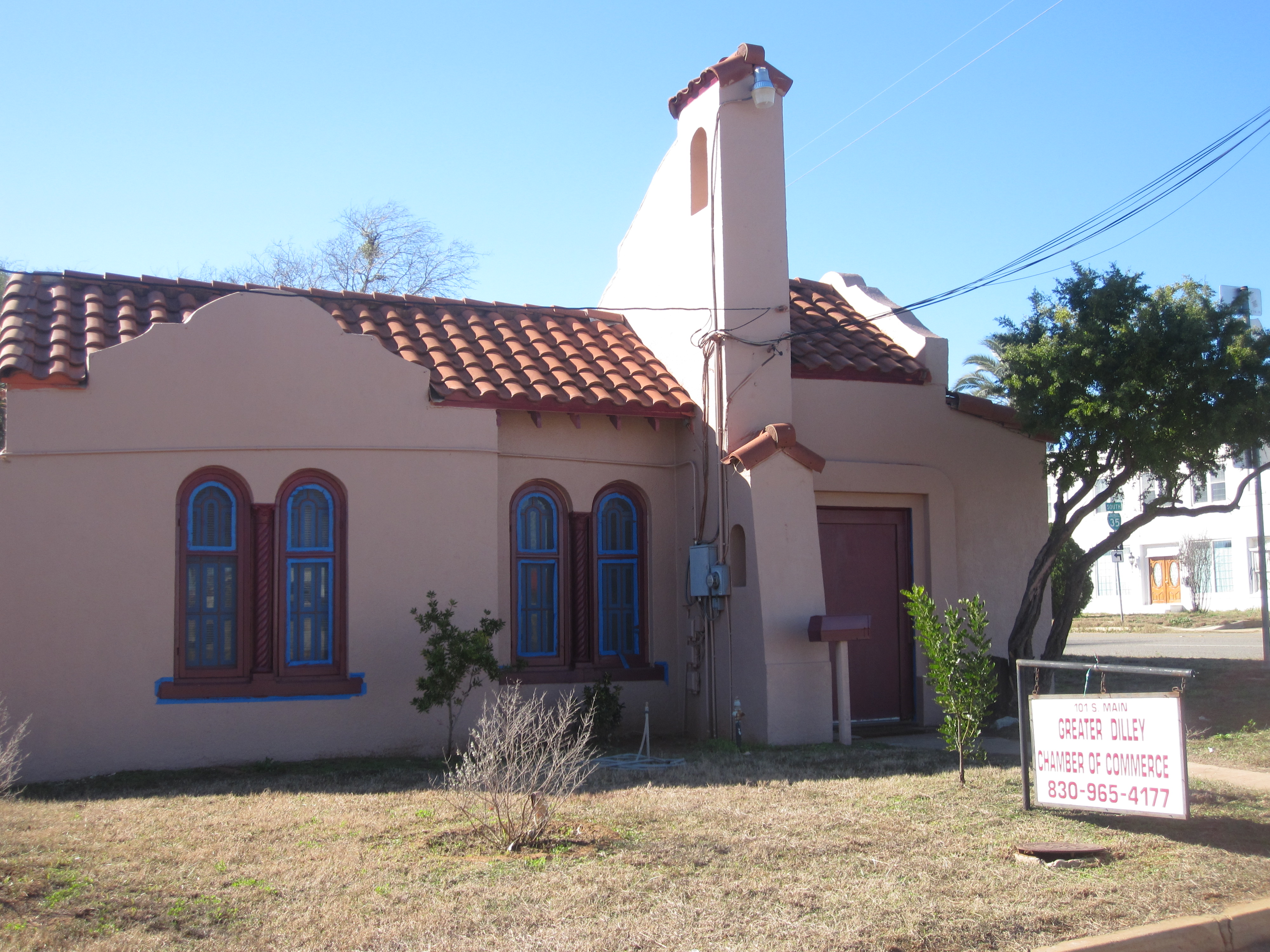
The Dilley Chamber of Commerce building

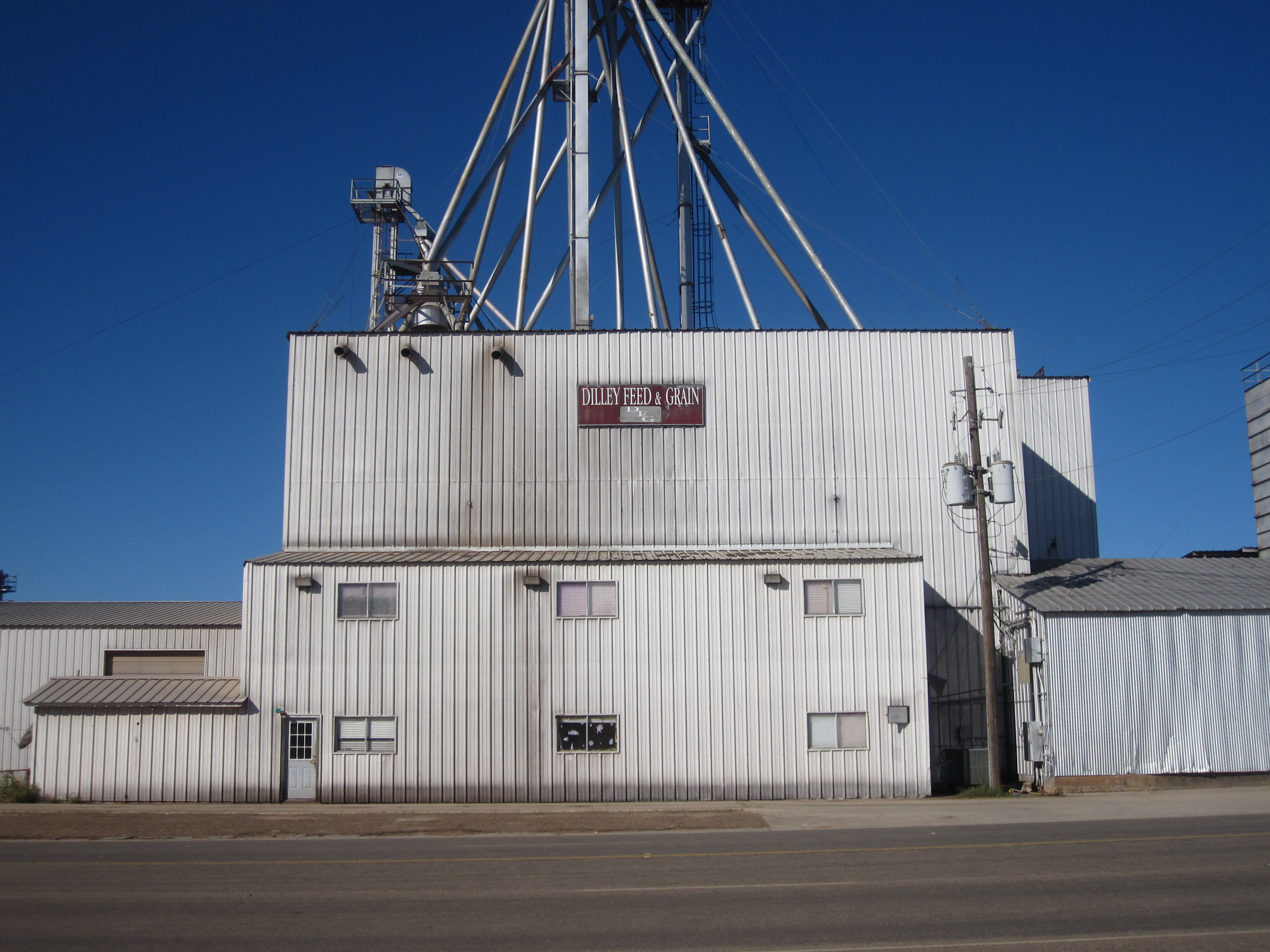
Dilley Feed and Grain operates a grain elevator and silos.

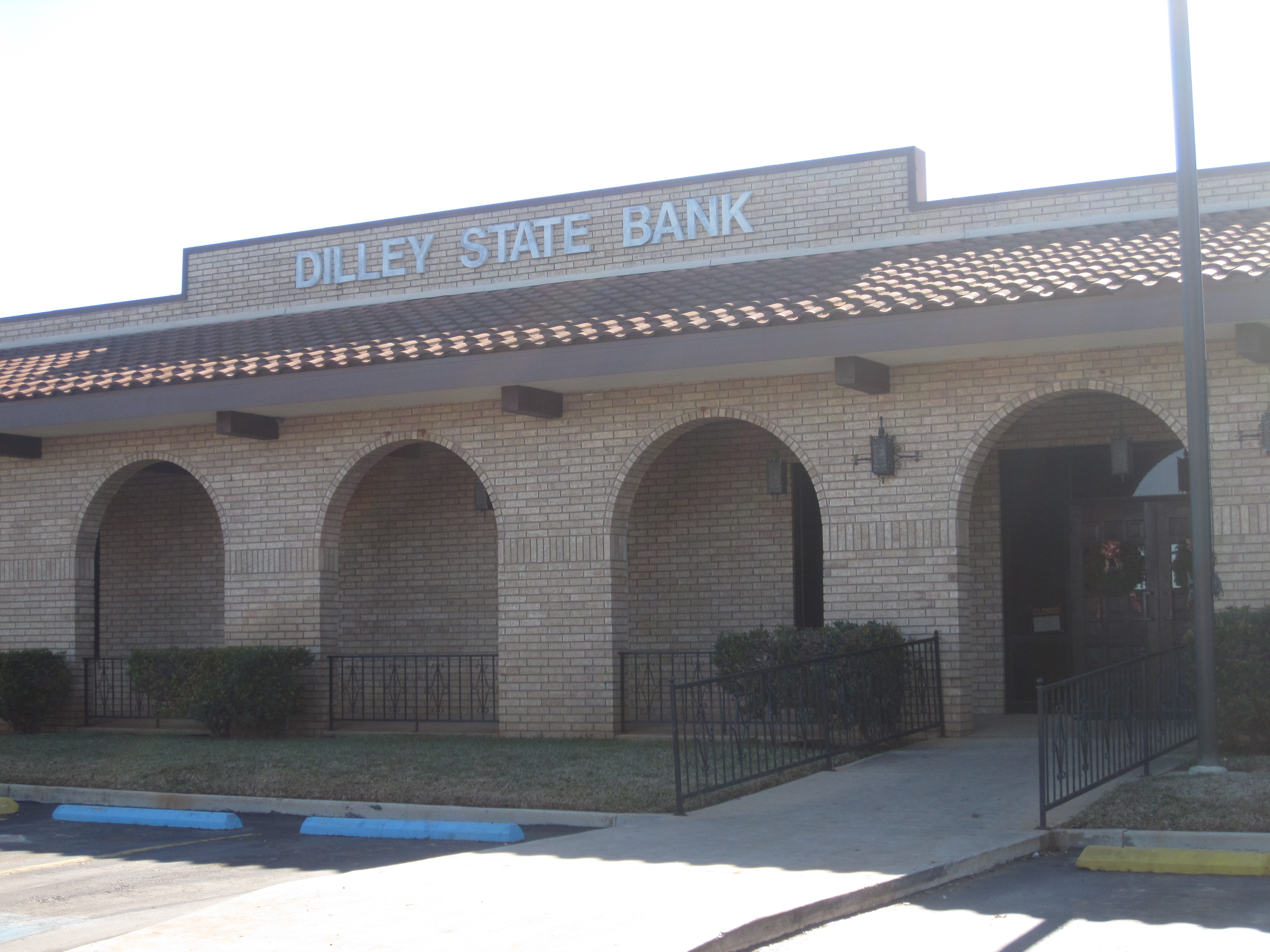
Dilley State Bank is located just off Interstate 35.

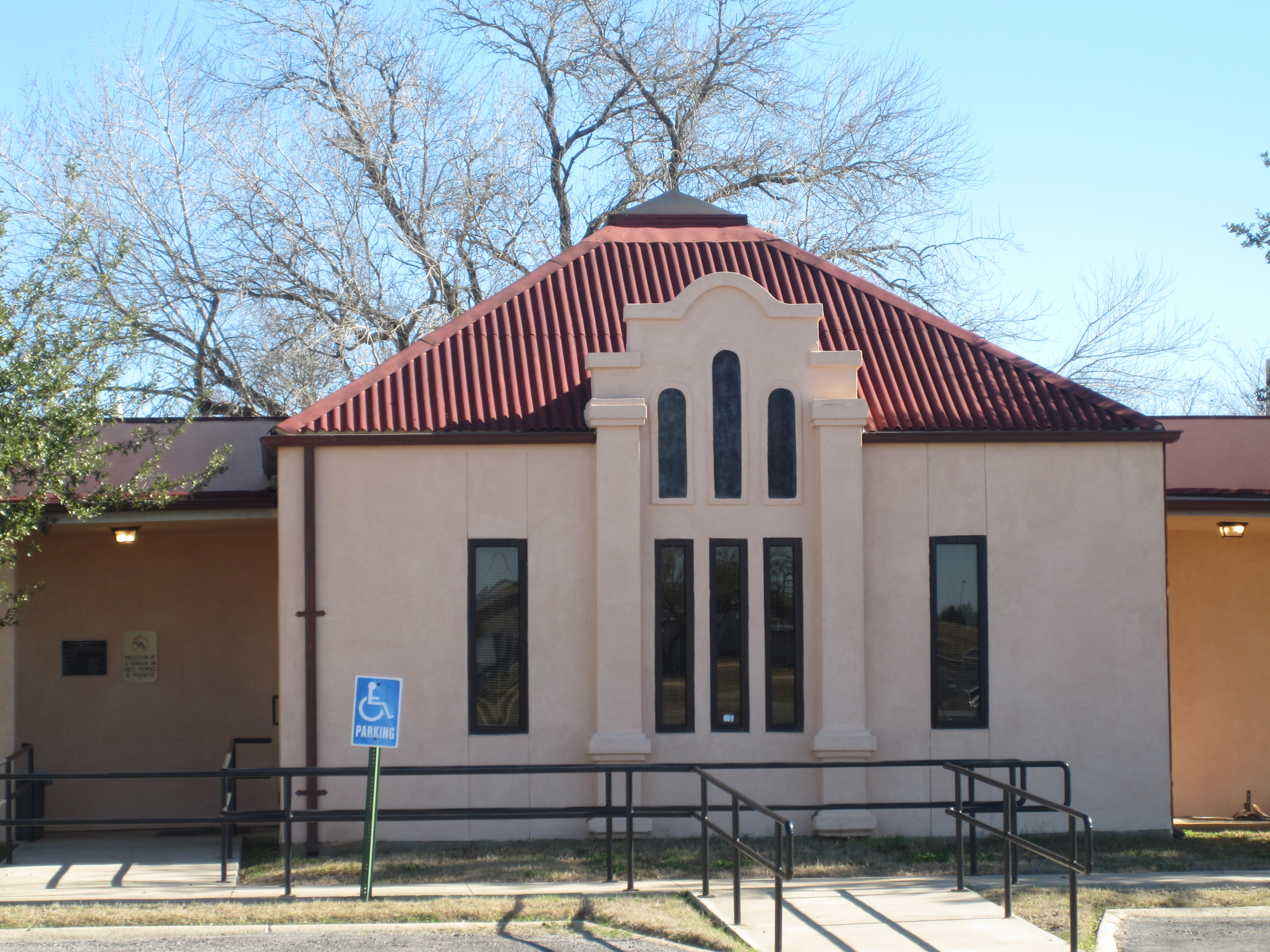
A small but modern hospital operates in Dilley.

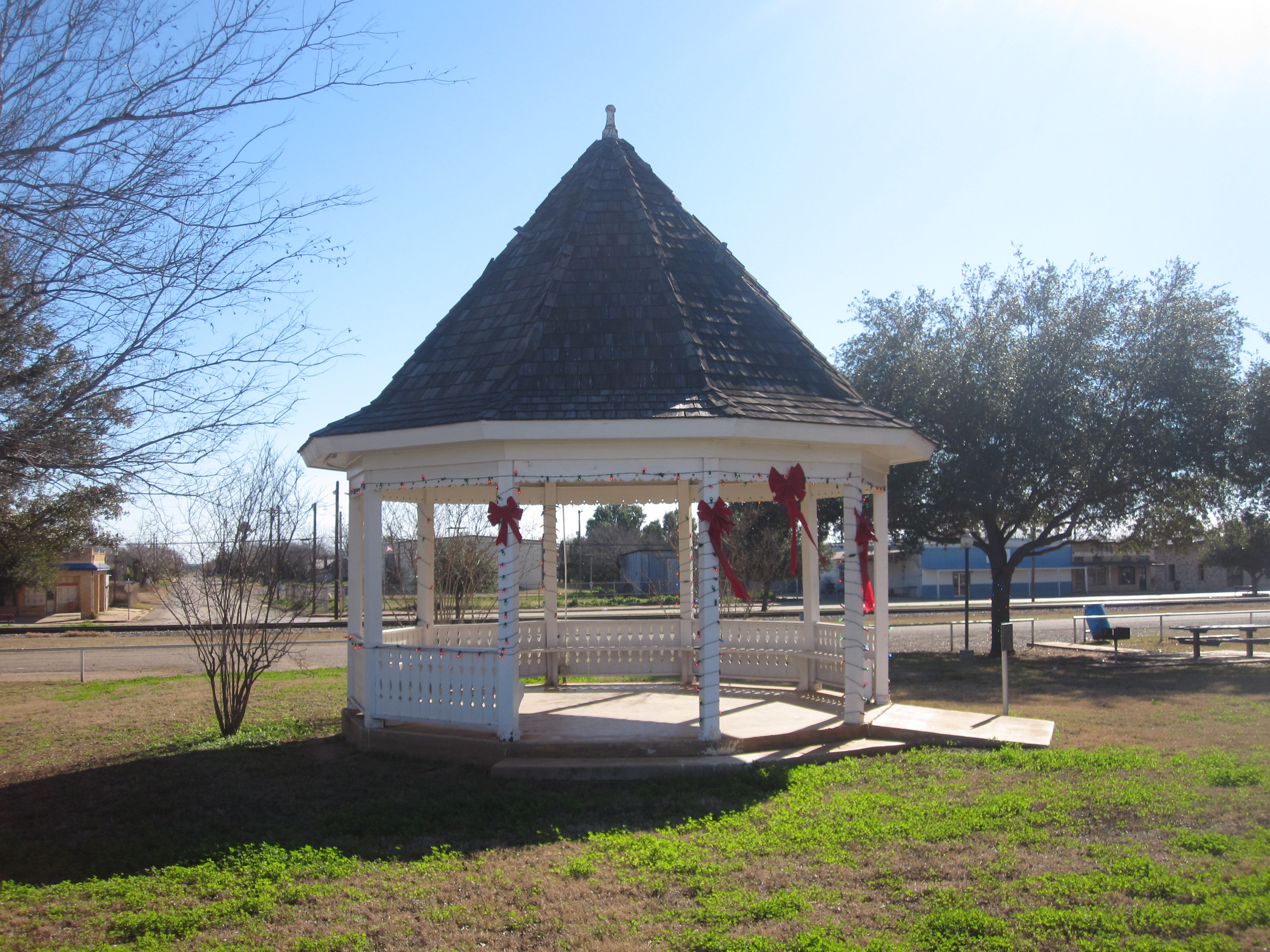
A pavilion in the downtown park in Dilley

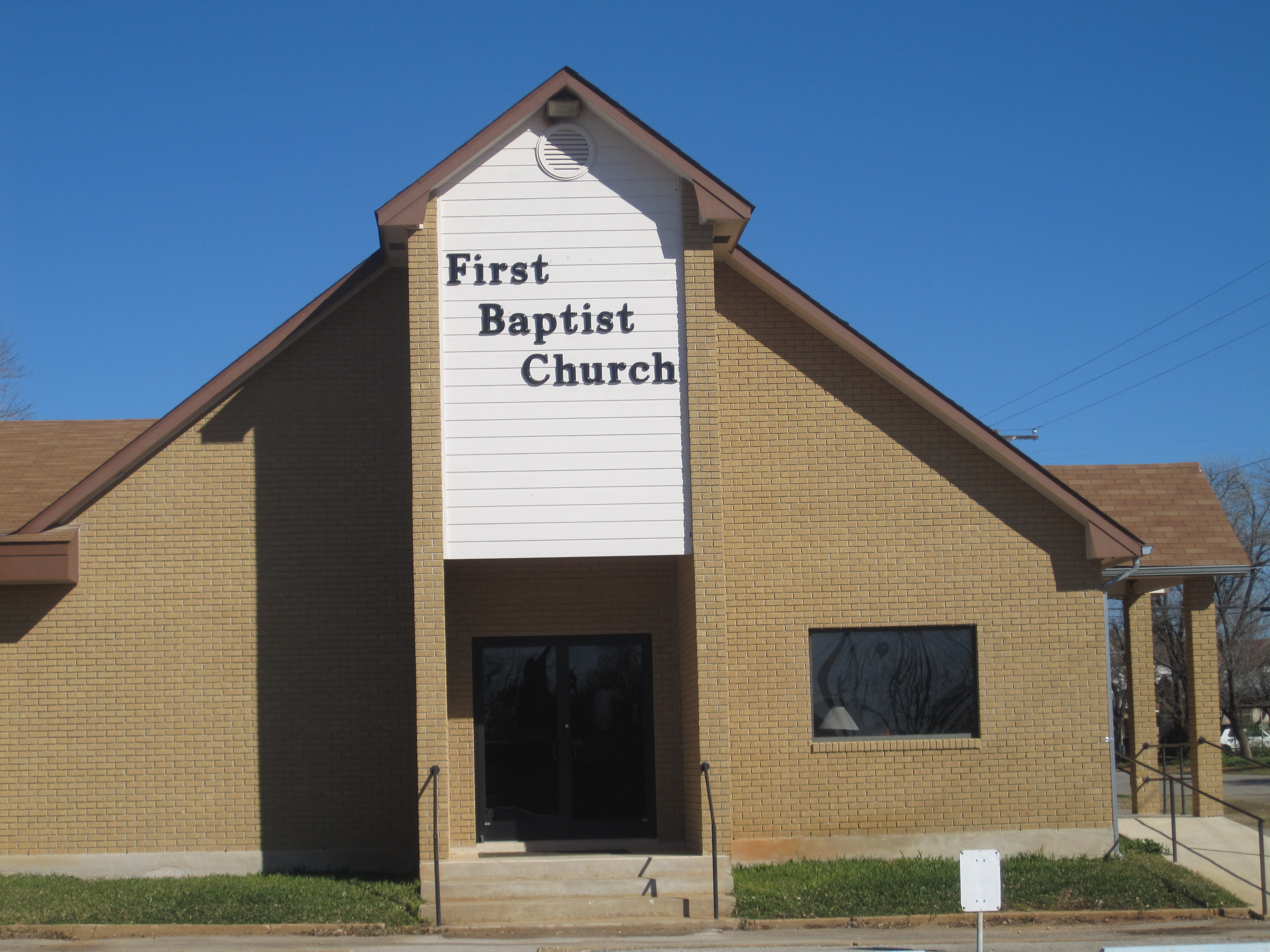
First Baptist Church in Dilley

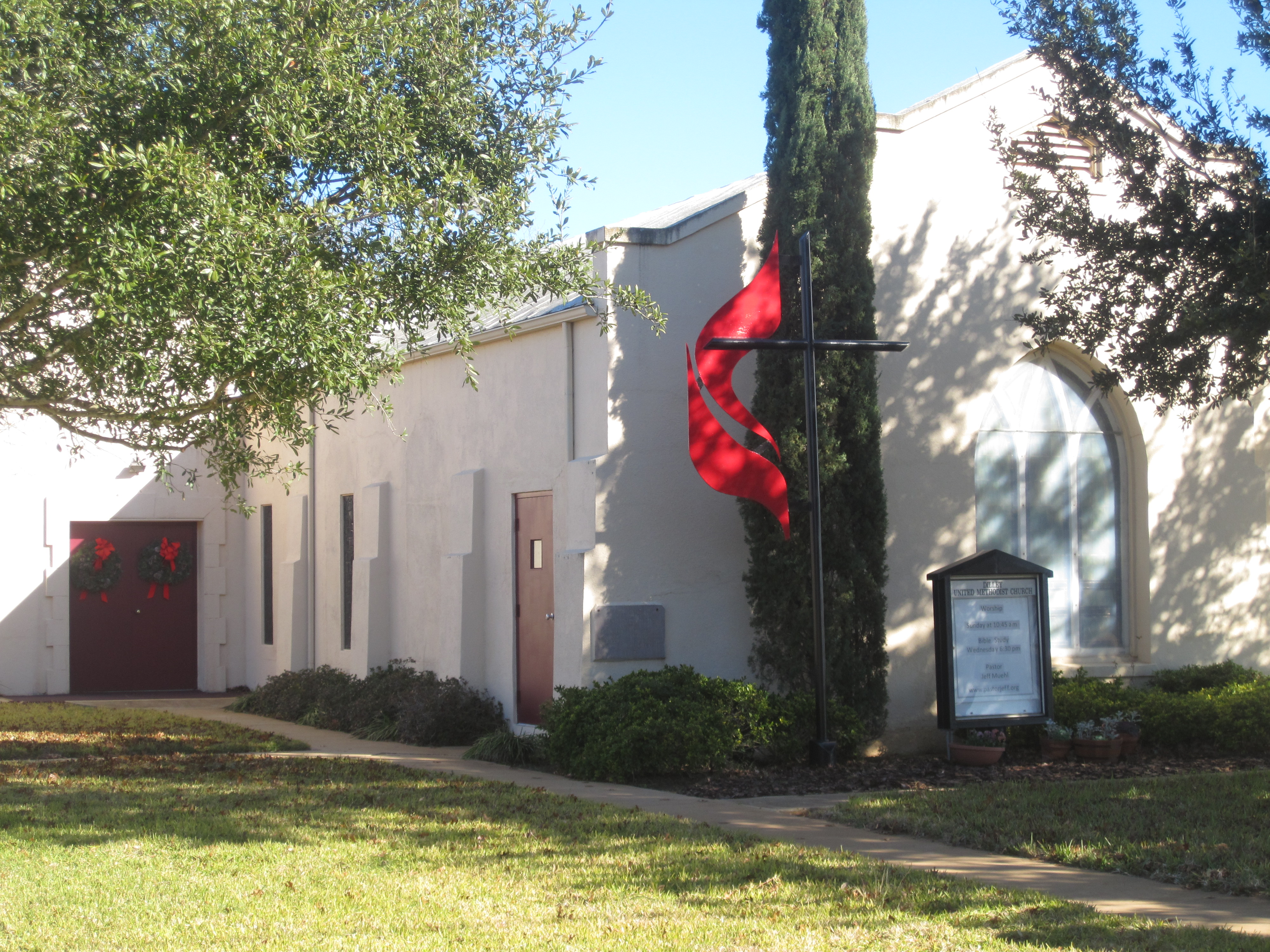
First United Methodist Church in Dilley with the "Catch the Spirit" emblem

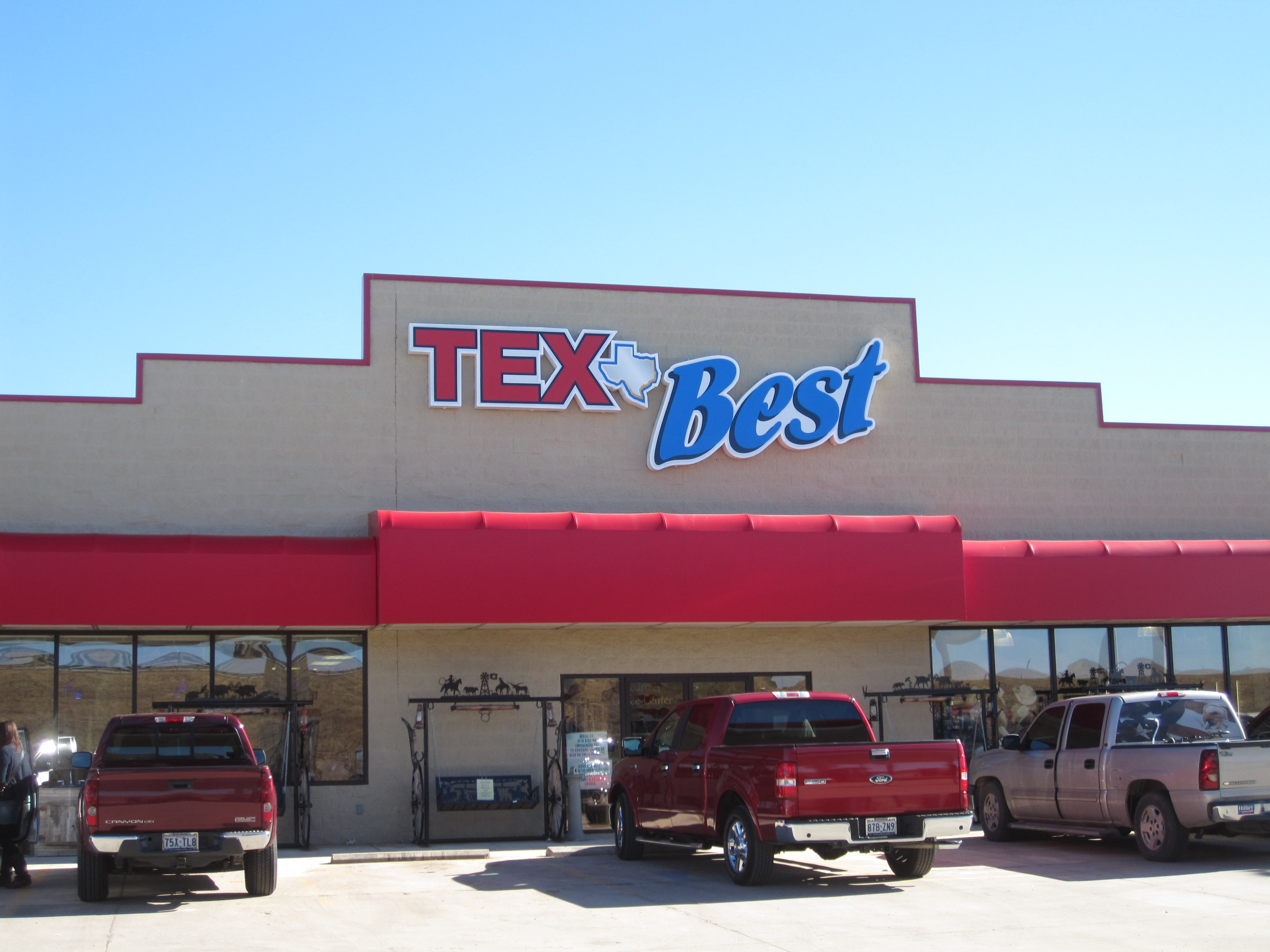
Tex Best, a large convenience store, operates off Interstate 35 in Dilley.

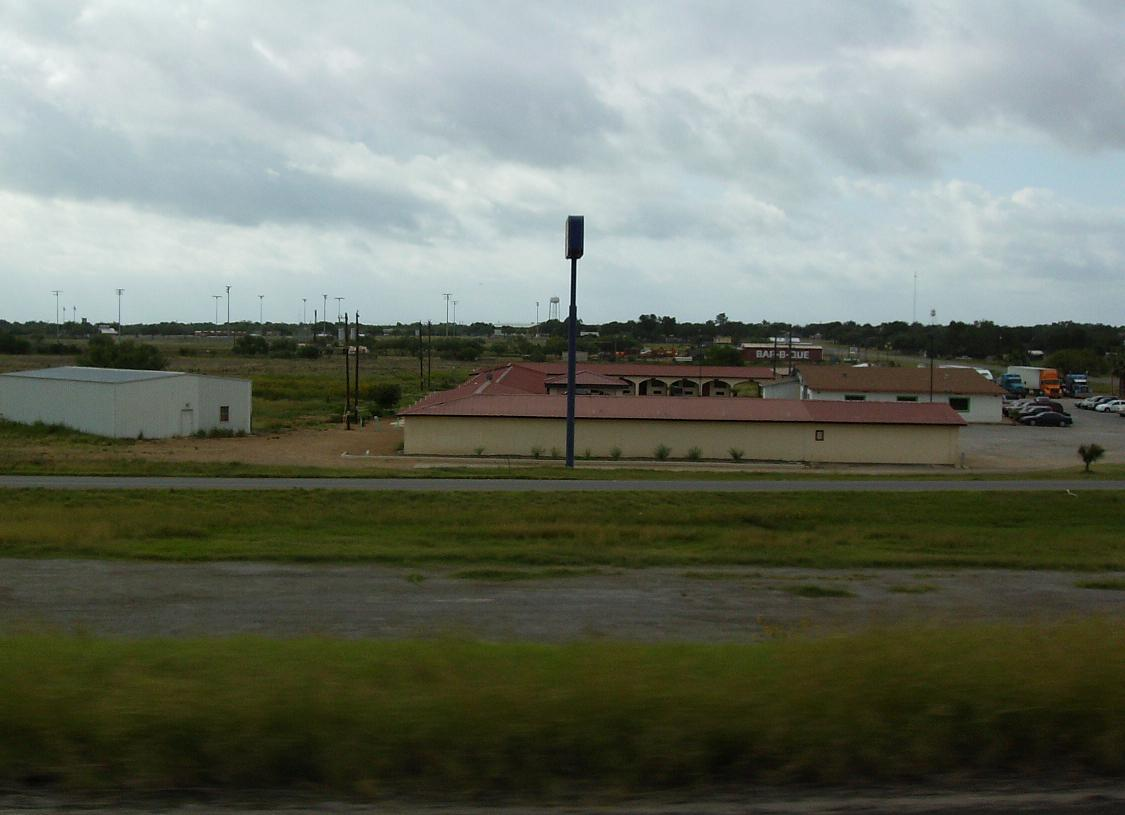
Dilley from Interstate 35

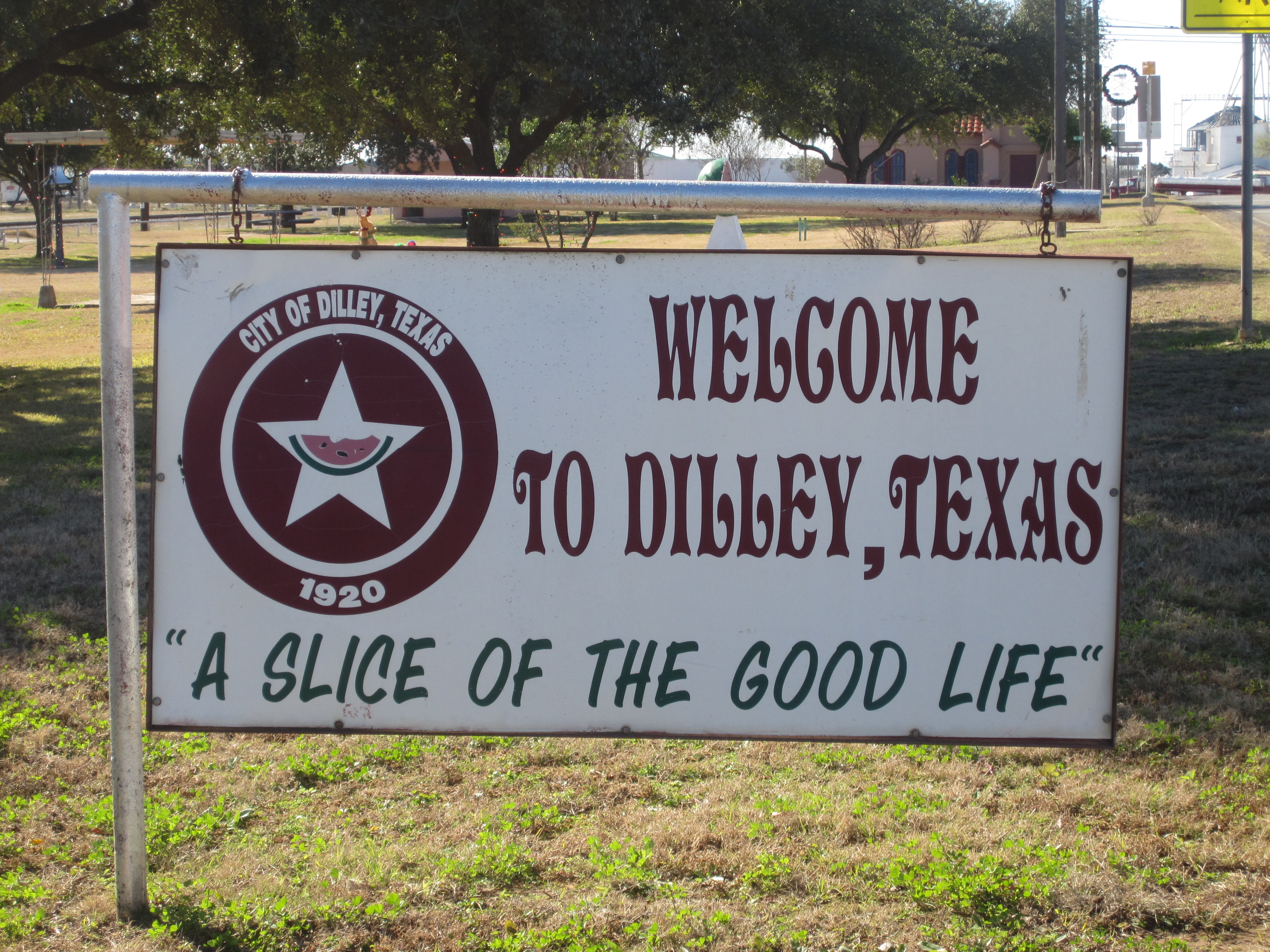
Welcome sign

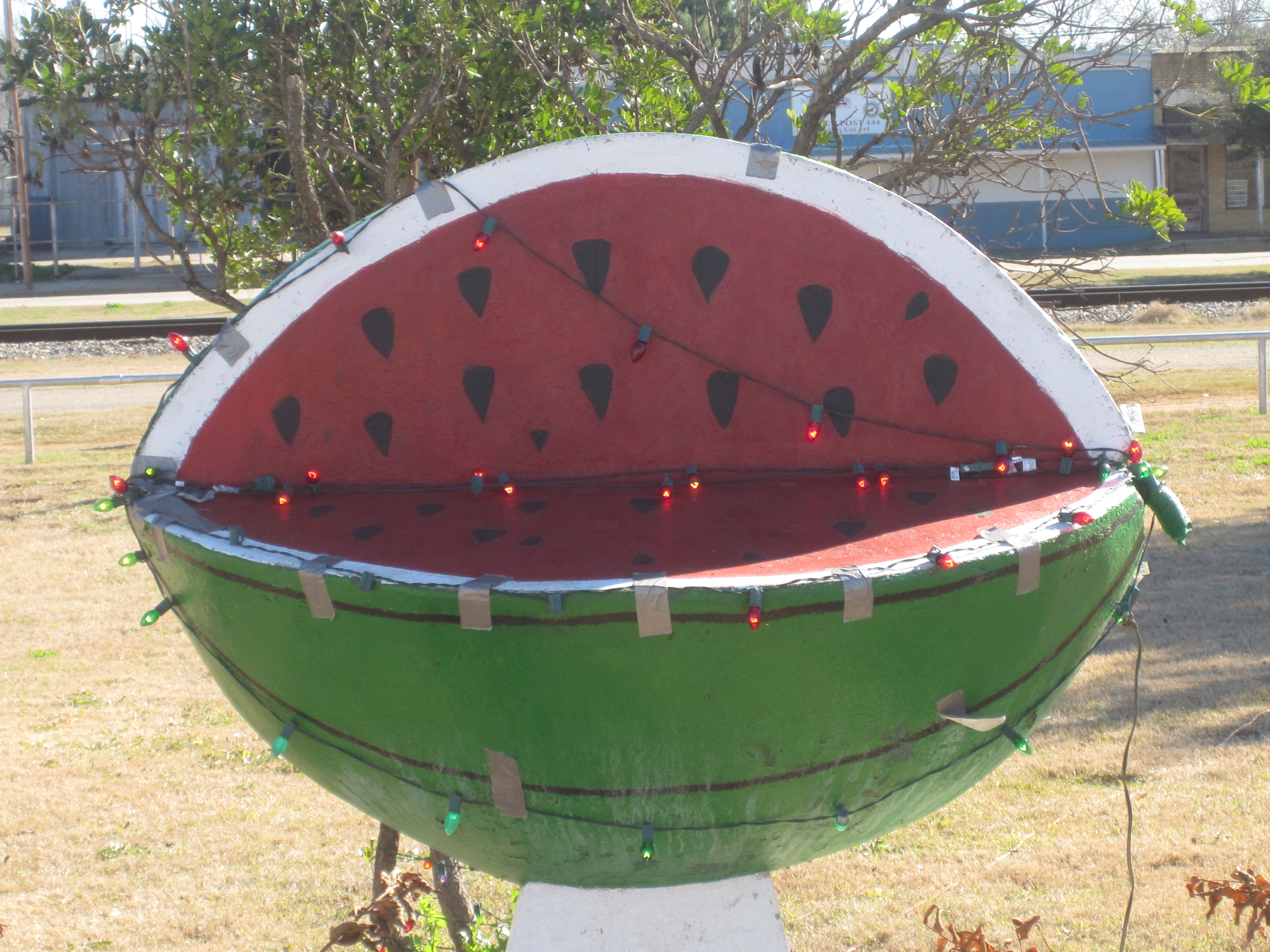
Not unlike Hope, Arkansas, Dilley has been famous for its summer watermelons.

== Climate ==
The climate in this area is characterized by hot, humid summers and generally mild to cool winters. According to the Köppen Climate Classification system, Dilley has a humid subtropical climate, abbreviated "Cfa" on climate maps.

== See also ==
- South Texas Family Residential Center, located in Dilley, the largest immigrant detention center in the United States
