= Old Frio County Jail =

- U.S. National Register of Historic Places
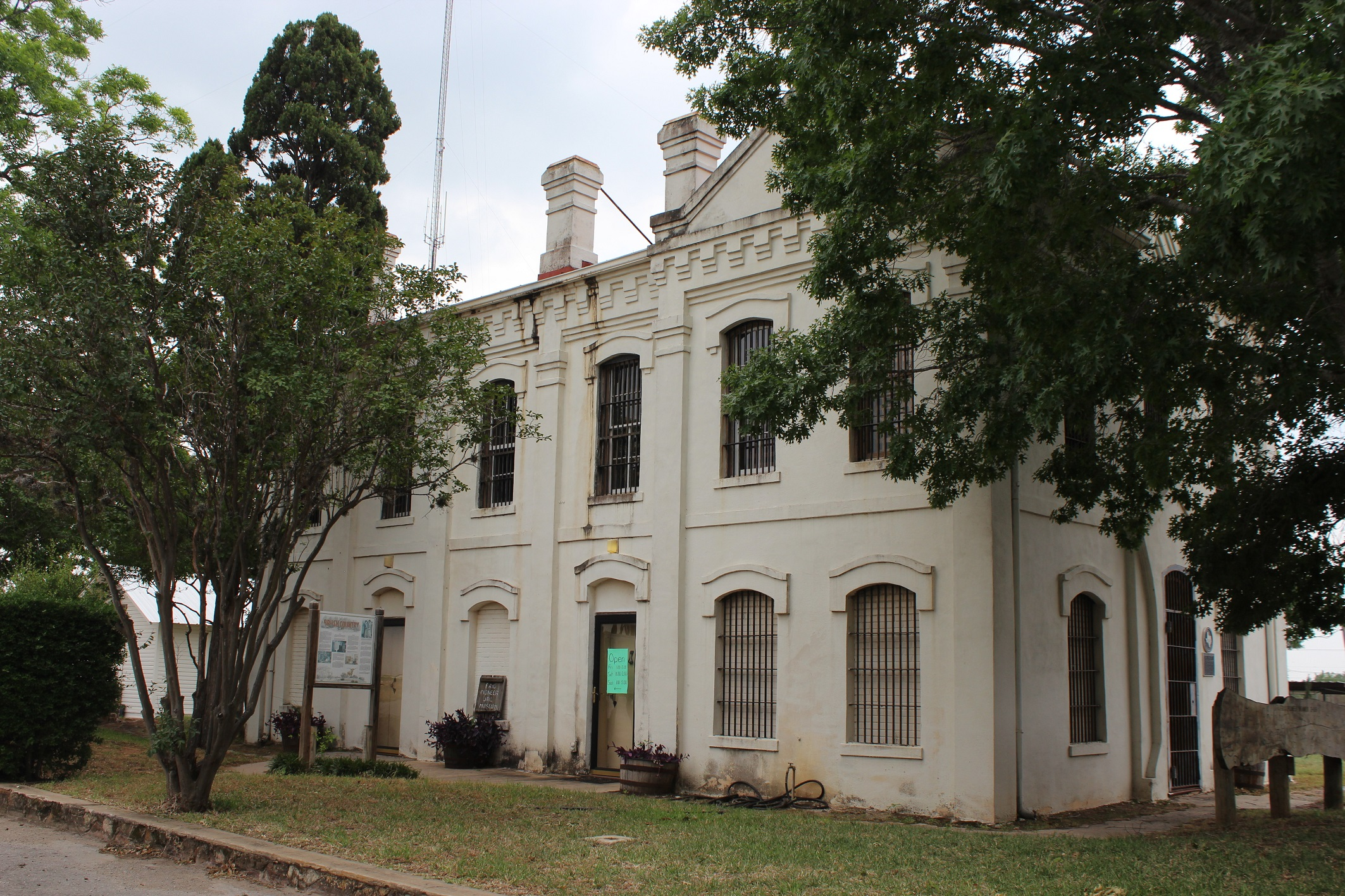

- Location within Texas
- Location: E. Medina and S. Pecan Sts., Pearsall, Texas
- Coordinates: 28°53′16″N 99°05′35″W
- Area: less than one acre
- Built: 1884
- Built by: Pauly, P.J. & Bro.
- Architectural style: Late Victorian
- NRHP reference No.: 79002941
- Added to NRHP: November 19, 1979

The Old Frio County Jail, in Pearsall, Texas, was built in 1884. It was listed on the National Register of Historic Places in 1979. It serves as the Frio Pioneer Jail Museum.

It was built by P.J. Pauly & Bro. It is a two-story Victorian-style building with "elaborately moulded brickwork and functional thick plastered brick walls", and is "An excellent and well-preserved example of public Victorian architecture in rural Texas."

It is a Texas State Antiquities Landmark and a Recorded Texas Historic Landmark.
