= Dilley (surname) =

Dilley is the surname of the following people:

- Dilley sextuplets (born 1993), the first surviving set of sextuplets in the United States
- Barbara Dilley (born 1938), American dancer, performance artist, choreographer and educator
- Ben Dilley (born 1991), American cyclist
- Bruno Dilley (1913–1968), German Luftwaffe officer during World War II
- Ernie Dilley (1896–1968), English footballer
- Frank B. Dilley (1931–2018), American philosopher
- Gary Dilley (born 1945), American swimmer
- Graham Dilley (1959–2011), English cricketer
- Leslie Dilley (1941–2025), Welsh production designer and art director
- Mark Dilley (born 1969), Canadian race car driver
- Michael Dilley, English cricketer
- Philip Dilley (born 1955), British engineer, businessman, and public servant
- Whitney Crothers Dilley, American professor of comparative literature and cinema studies
