= Dilleys Mill, West Virginia =

Unincorporated community in West Virginia, United States

- Unincorporated community
- Location within West Virginia Location within the United States
- Coordinates: 38°16′08″N 79°57′45″W
- Country: United States
- State: West Virginia
- County: Pocahontas
- Elevation: 2,575 ft (785 m)
- Time zone: UTC-5 (Eastern (EST))
  - Summer (DST): UTC-4 (EDT)
- Area codes: 304 & 681
- GNIS feature ID: 1554302

Dilleys Mill is an unincorporated community in Pocahontas County, West Virginia, United States. Dilleys Mill is located near West Virginia Route 28, 8 miles (13 km) northeast of Marlinton.
