= Aleck Pearsall =

American baseball player

Brooklyn Excelsiors
- First Baseman
- Bats: Unknown Throws: Unknown

Aleck T. Pearsall was an American baseball player for the Excelsior of Brooklyn during the game's amateur era. He played first base for Brooklyn. In the winter of 1862, he volunteered in the Confederate army, as a surgeon. During the war, he worked as brigade surgeon in Richmond, Virginia. He sometimes attended to Union prisoners, some of which were his former teammates. When the news about Pearsall working for the Confederates reached Brooklyn, the Excelsior club expelled him.

He settled down in Montgomery, Alabama.
