= Dilley Independent School District =

School district in Texas, United States

Dilley Independent School District is a public school district based in Dilley, Texas (USA).

Located in Frio County, a portion of the district extends into La Salle County.

In 2009, the school district was rated "academically acceptable" by the Texas Education Agency.

== Schools ==
- Dilley High School
- Mary Harper Middle School
- Dilley Elementary School
