= Frio County, Texas =

County in Texas, United States

- County
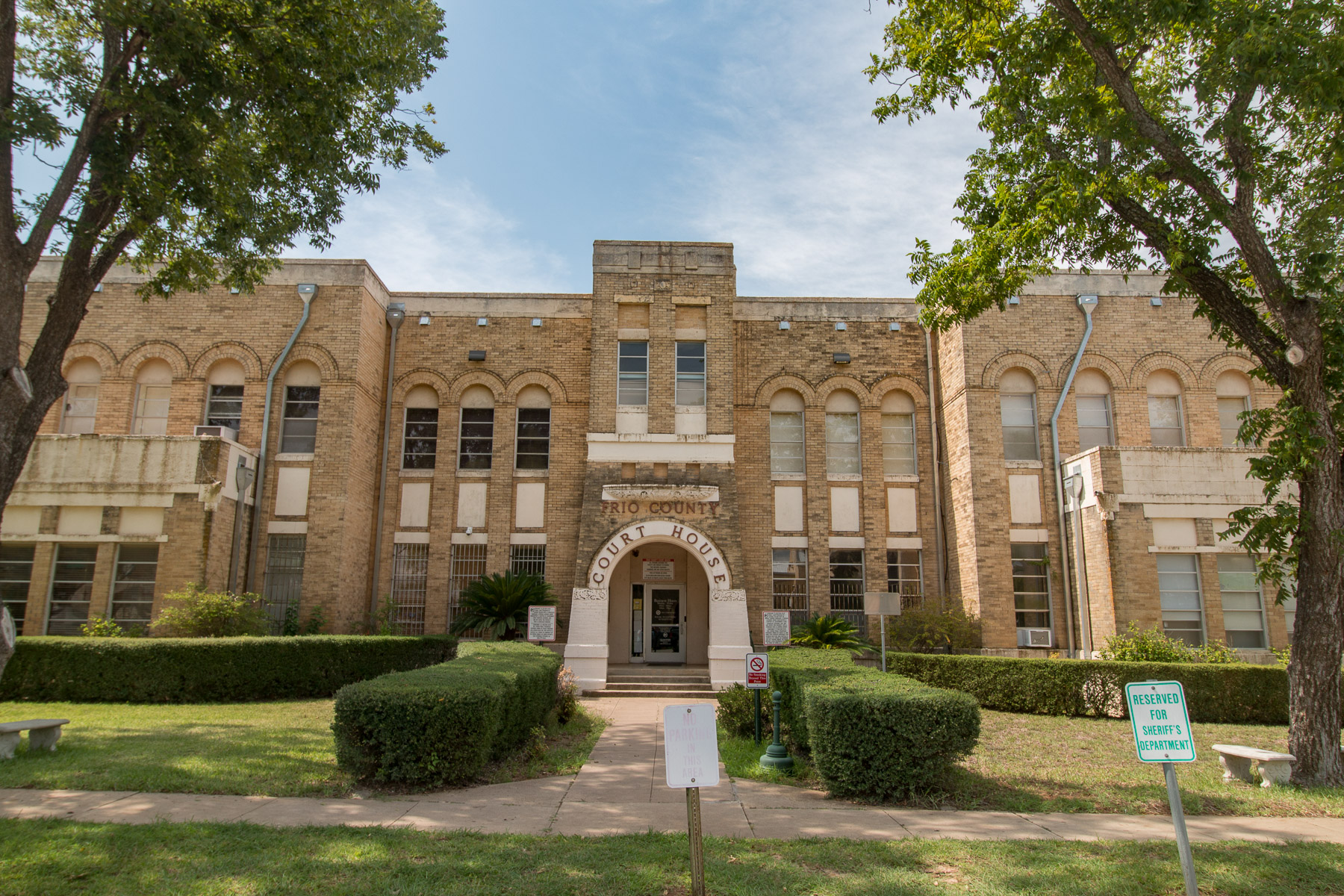
- The Frio County Courthouse in Pearsall

- Location within the U.S. state of Texas
- Coordinates: 28°52′N 99°07′W
- Country: United States
- State: Texas
- Founded: 1871
- Named for: Frio River
- Seat: Pearsall
- Largest city: Pearsall

Area
  - Total: 1,134 sq mi (2,940 km^{2})
  - Land: 1,134 sq mi (2,940 km^{2})
  - Water: 0.8 sq mi (2.1 km^{2}) 0.07%

Population (2020)
  - Total: 18,385
  - Estimate (2025): 18,823 ▲
  - Density: 15/sq mi (5.8/km^{2})
- Time zone: UTC−6 (Central)
  - Summer (DST): UTC−5 (CDT)
- Congressional district: 23rd
- Website: www.co.frio.tx.us

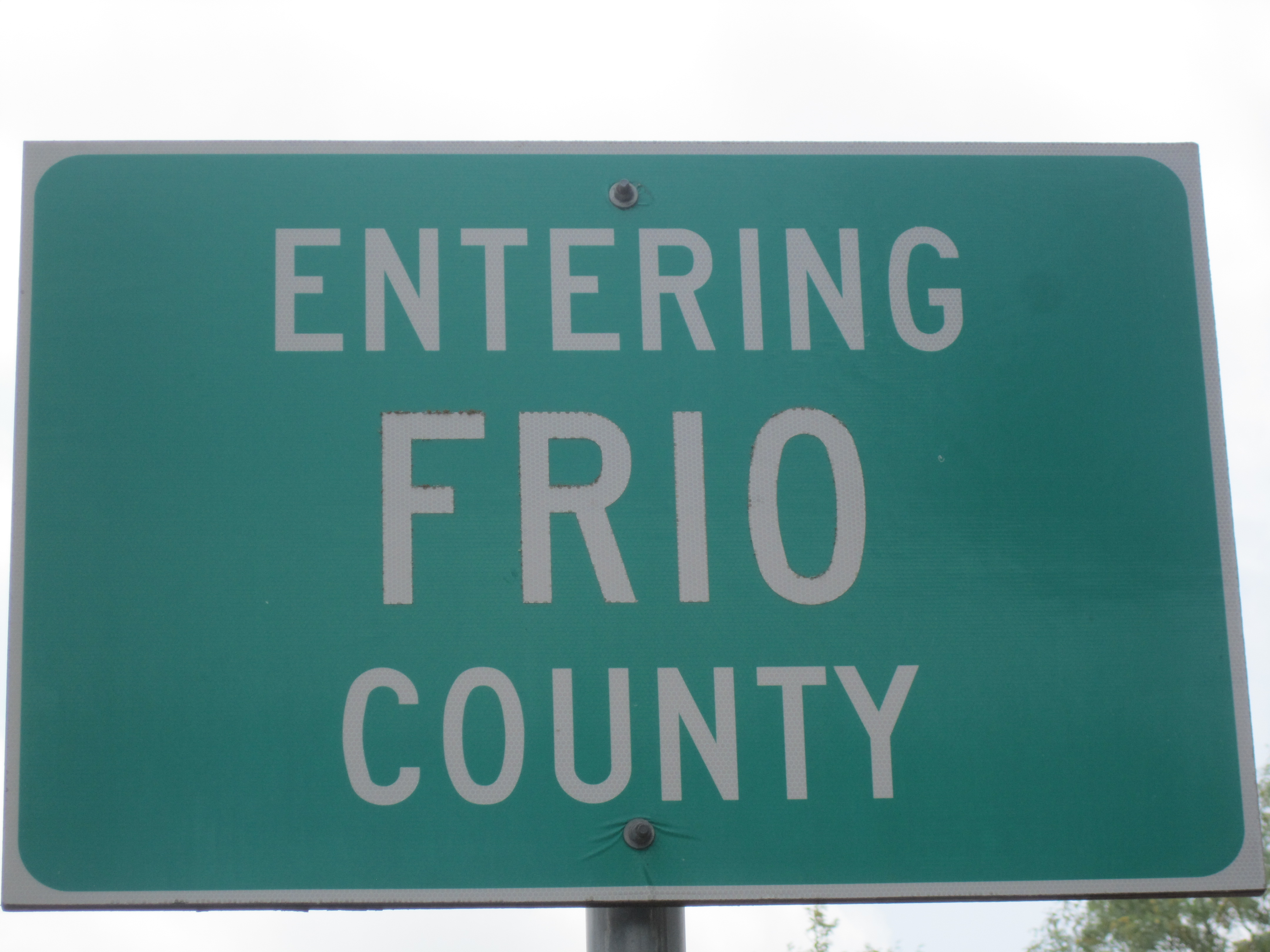

Frio County is a county located in the U.S. state of Texas. As of the 2020 census, its population was 18,385. Its county seat is Pearsall. The county was created in 1858 and later organized in 1871. Frio is named for the Frio River, whose name is Spanish for "cold".

== Geography ==
According to the U.S. Census Bureau, the county has a total area of 1,134 square miles (2,940 km^{2}), of which 1,134 sq mi (2,940 km^{2}) are land and 0.8 sq mi (2.1 km^{2}) (0.07%) is covered by water.

=== Major highways ===
- Interstate 35
  - I-35 BL (Dilley)
  - I-35 BL (Pearsall)
- U.S. Highway 57
- State Highway 85
- State Highway 173
- Spur 581
- FM 140
- FM 1582

=== Adjacent counties ===
- Medina County (north)
- Atascosa County (east)
- McMullen County (southeast)
- La Salle County (south)
- Dimmit County (southwest)
- Zavala County (west)
- Uvalde County (northwest)

== Demographics ==
Historical population
Census	Pop.	Note	%±
1860	42		—
1870	309		635.7%
1880	2,130		589.3%
1890	3,112		46.1%
1900	4,200		35.0%
1910	8,895		111.8%
1920	9,286		4.4%
1930	9,411		1.3%
1940	9,207		−2.2%
1950	10,357		12.5%
1960	10,112		−2.4%
1970	11,159		10.4%
1980	13,785		23.5%
1990	13,472		−2.3%
2000	16,252		20.6%
2010	17,217		5.9%
2020	18,385		6.8%
2025 (est.)	18,823	▲	2.4%
U.S. Decennial Census; 1850–2010 2010–2014 2020

=== Racial and ethnic composition ===
Frio County, Texas – Racial and ethnic composition Note: the US Census treats Hispanic/Latino as an ethnic category. This table excludes Latinos from the racial categories and assigns them to a separate category. Hispanics/Latinos may be of any race.
Race / Ethnicity (NH = Non-Hispanic)	Pop 1980	Pop 1990	Pop 2000	Pop 2010	Pop 2020	% 1980	% 1990	% 2000	% 2010	% 2020
White alone (NH)	4,277	3,509	3,344	2,796	3,053	31.03%	26.05%	20.58%	16.24%	16.61%
Black or African American alone (NH)	48	141	777	524	705	0.35%	1.05%	4.78%	3.04%	3.83%
Native American or Alaska Native alone (NH)	23	8	14	38	49	0.17%	0.06%	0.09%	0.22%	0.27%
Asian alone (NH)	10	29	58	362	199	0.07%	0.22%	0.36%	2.10%	1.08%
Native Hawaiian or Pacific Islander alone (NH)	x	x	1	1	9	x	x	0.01%	0.01%	0.05%
Other race alone (NH)	0	36	25	29	81	0.00%	0.27%	0.15%	0.17%	0.44%
Mixed race or Multiracial (NH)	x	x	46	66	118	x	x	0.28%	0.38%	0.64%
Hispanic or Latino (any race)	9,427	9,749	11,987	13,401	14,171	68.39%	72.36%	73.76%	77.84%	77.08%
Total	13,785	13,472	16,252	17,217	18,385	100.00%	100.00%	100.00%	100.00%	100.00%

=== 2020 census ===
As of the 2020 census, the county had a population of 18,385 and a median age of 33.0 years; 24.8% of residents were under age 18, and 13.2% were 65 years of age or older. For every 100 females there were 123.3 males, and for every 100 females age 18 and over there were 134.7 males age 18 and over.

As of the 2020 census, the racial makeup of the county was 46.3% White, 3.9% Black or African American, 0.7% American Indian and Alaska Native, 1.1% Asian, <0.1% Native Hawaiian and Pacific Islander, 27.3% from some other race, and 20.6% from two or more races, with Hispanic or Latino residents of any race comprising 77.1% of the population.

As of the 2020 census, 49.3% of residents lived in urban areas while 50.7% lived in rural areas.

As of the 2020 census, there were 5,190 households, 37.9% of which had children under age 18; 45.4% were married-couple households, 19.1% were households with a male householder and no spouse or partner present, and 28.3% were households with a female householder and no spouse or partner present. About 23.4% of all households were made up of individuals and 10.7% had someone living alone who was 65 years of age or older. There were 6,340 housing units, 18.1% of which were vacant, 64.7% owner-occupied, 35.3% renter-occupied, with a 1.1% homeowner vacancy rate and a 10.1% rental vacancy rate.

=== 2000 census ===
As of the 2000 census, 16,252 people, 4,743 households, and 3,642 families resided in the county. The population density was 14 people per square mile (5.4 people/km^{2}). The 5,660 housing units averaged 5 per square mile (1.9/km^{2}). The racial makeup of the county was 71.86% White, 4.87% Black or African American, 0.58% Native American, 0.41% Asian, 0.02% Pacific Islander, 19.76% from other races, and 2.50% from two or more races. About 73.76% of the population was Hispanic or Latino of any race.

Of the 4,743 households, 40.70% had children under the age of 18 living with them, 55.20% were married couples living together, 16.00% had a female householder with no husband present, and 23.20% were not families. About 20.60% of all households was made up of individuals, and 9.30% had someone living alone who was 65 years of age or older. The average household size was 2.98 and the average family size was 3.44.

In the county, the population was distributed as 28.70% under the age of 18, 11.20% from 18 to 24, 30.80% from 25 to 44, 18.70% from 45 to 64, and 10.60% who were 65 years of age or older. The median age was 31 years. For every 100 females, there were 121.40 males. For every 100 females age 18 and over, there were 130.20 males.

The median income for a household in the county was $24,504, and for a family was $26,578. Males had a median income of $23,810 versus $16,498 for females. The per capita income for the county was $16,069. About 24.50% of families and 29.00% of the population were below the poverty line, including 36.20% of those under age 18 and 30.40% of those age 65 or over.

== Politics ==
United States presidential election results for Frio County, Texas
Year	Republican		Democratic		Third party(ies)	
Year	No.	%	No.	%	No.	%
1912	25	5.07%	418	84.79%	50	10.14%
1916	55	11.68%	410	87.05%	6	1.27%
1920	102	19.17%	421	79.14%	9	1.69%
1924	158	19.55%	637	78.84%	13	1.61%
1928	673	72.21%	258	27.68%	1	0.11%
1932	142	12.46%	998	87.54%	0	0.00%
1936	193	15.83%	1,019	83.59%	7	0.57%
1940	236	18.85%	1,012	80.83%	4	0.32%
1944	293	21.40%	951	69.47%	125	9.13%
1948	345	25.73%	898	66.96%	98	7.31%
1952	1,011	50.52%	983	49.13%	7	0.35%
1956	825	47.94%	886	51.48%	10	0.58%
1960	713	39.83%	1,068	59.66%	9	0.50%
1964	607	28.67%	1,507	71.19%	3	0.14%
1968	795	32.69%	1,330	54.69%	307	12.62%
1972	1,904	54.23%	1,588	45.23%	19	0.54%
1976	1,280	32.75%	2,598	66.48%	30	0.77%
1980	1,753	37.55%	2,849	61.03%	66	1.41%
1984	2,003	42.90%	2,656	56.89%	10	0.21%
1988	1,505	33.16%	3,016	66.46%	17	0.37%
1992	1,275	29.52%	2,377	55.04%	667	15.44%
1996	1,225	29.94%	2,593	63.37%	274	6.70%
2000	1,774	42.97%	2,317	56.13%	37	0.90%
2004	1,991	50.66%	1,931	49.13%	8	0.20%
2008	1,644	40.47%	2,405	59.21%	13	0.32%
2012	1,559	39.29%	2,376	59.88%	33	0.83%
2016	1,856	42.18%	2,444	55.55%	100	2.27%
2020	2,823	53.48%	2,422	45.88%	34	0.64%
2024	3,060	61.88%	1,848	37.37%	37	0.75%

United States Senate election results for Frio County, Texas1
Year	Republican		Democratic		Third party(ies)	
Year	No.	%	No.	%	No.	%
2024	2,557	52.87%	2,039	42.16%	240	4.96%

United States Senate election results for Frio County, Texas2
Year	Republican		Democratic		Third party(ies)	
Year	No.	%	No.	%	No.	%
2020	2,489	50.58%	2,283	46.39%	149	3.03%

Texas Gubernatorial election results for Frio County
Year	Republican		Democratic		Third party(ies)	
Year	No.	%	No.	%	No.	%
2022	1,872	50.21%	1,791	48.04%	65	1.74%

Frio County has leaned Democratic at the presidential level. It voted Republican in 2004, 2020, and 2024.

== Communities ==
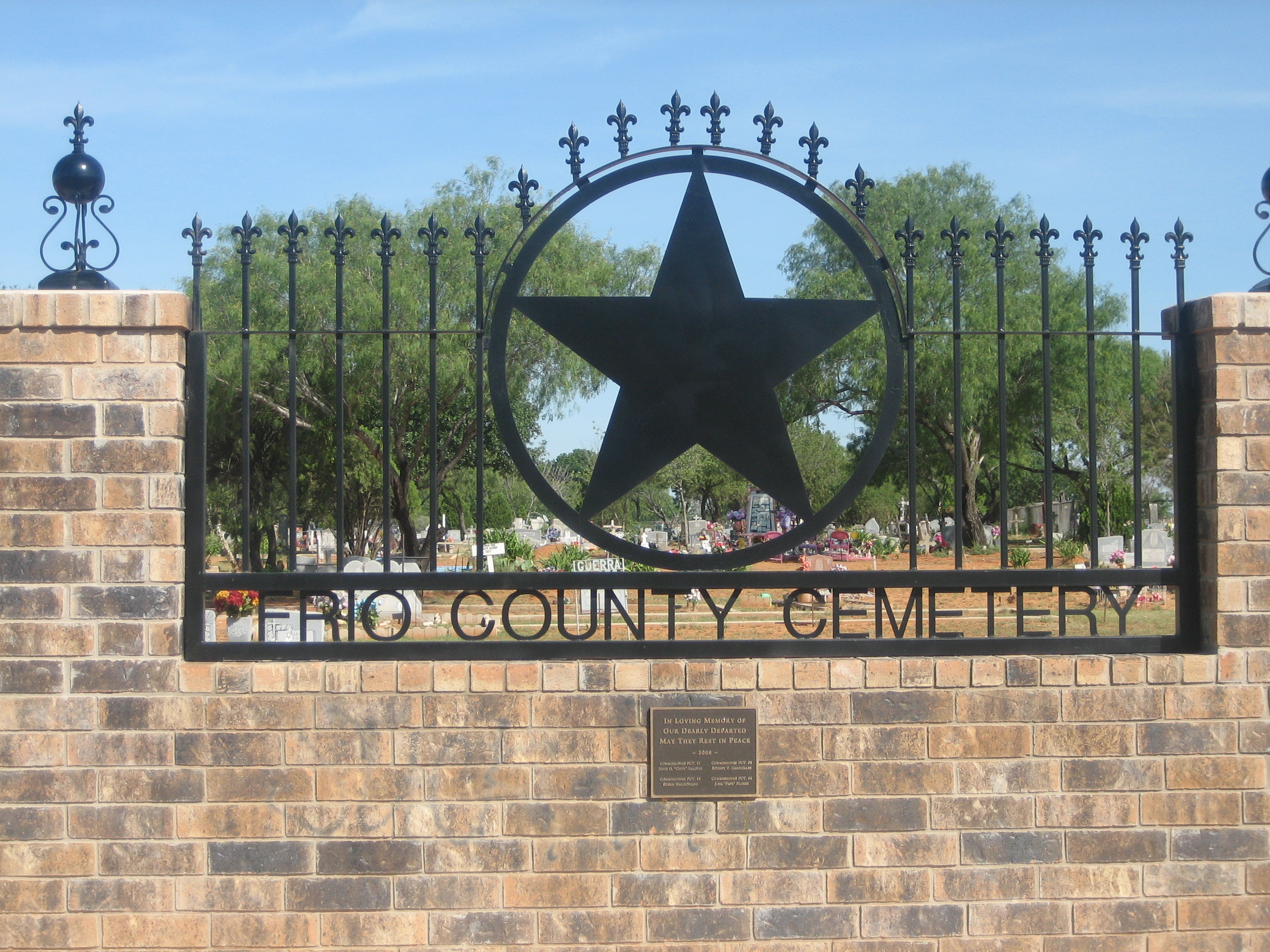
Frio County Cemetery is located just off Interstate 35 in Pearsall.

=== Cities ===
- Dilley
- Pearsall (county seat)

=== Census-designated places ===
- Bigfoot
- Hilltop
- Moore
- North Pearsall

=== Unincorporated area ===
- Derby

=== Ghost town ===
- Frio Town

== Education ==
School districts include:

- Charlotte Independent School District
- Devine Independent School District
- Dilley Independent School District
- Hondo Independent School District
- Pearsall Independent School District

The designated community college for the entire county is Southwest Texas Junior College.

== See also ==
- National Register of Historic Places listings in Frio County, Texas
- Recorded Texas Historic Landmarks in Frio County
- Winter Garden Region
