= Pearsall Independent School District =

School district in Texas, United States

Pearsall Independent School District is a public school district based in Pearsall, Texas (United States). In 2009, the school district was rated "academically acceptable" by the Texas Education Agency (TEA).

== History ==
By December 2015, the district had failed to meet academic standards for four years in a row. Nobert Rodriguez, the superintendent, stated that turnover among teachers and staff had caused student performance to decline. The teacher retention rate around 2015 was 38%, and in 2012, the high school had five different principals.

In November 2015, the TEA announced that it had revoked the accreditation of Pearsall ISD. Pearsall ISD appealed the TEA's revocation of accreditation. If the appeal failed, the district faced closure by the TEA by July 1, 2016.

In October 2016, Pearsall ISD was taken over by the TEA, with plans to replace the district's entire board of trustees and superintendent, citing years of "academically unacceptable or insufficient performances." Pearsall ISD successfully appealed, and avoided a state takeover in November 2016, when the district was able to meet academic standards.

== Schools ==
- Pearsall High School (grades 9-12)
- Pearsall Junior High School (grades 6-8)
- Pearsall Intermediate School (grades 3-5)
- Ted Flores Elementary School (prekindergarten-grade 2)
