= Pearsall, Texas =

- City
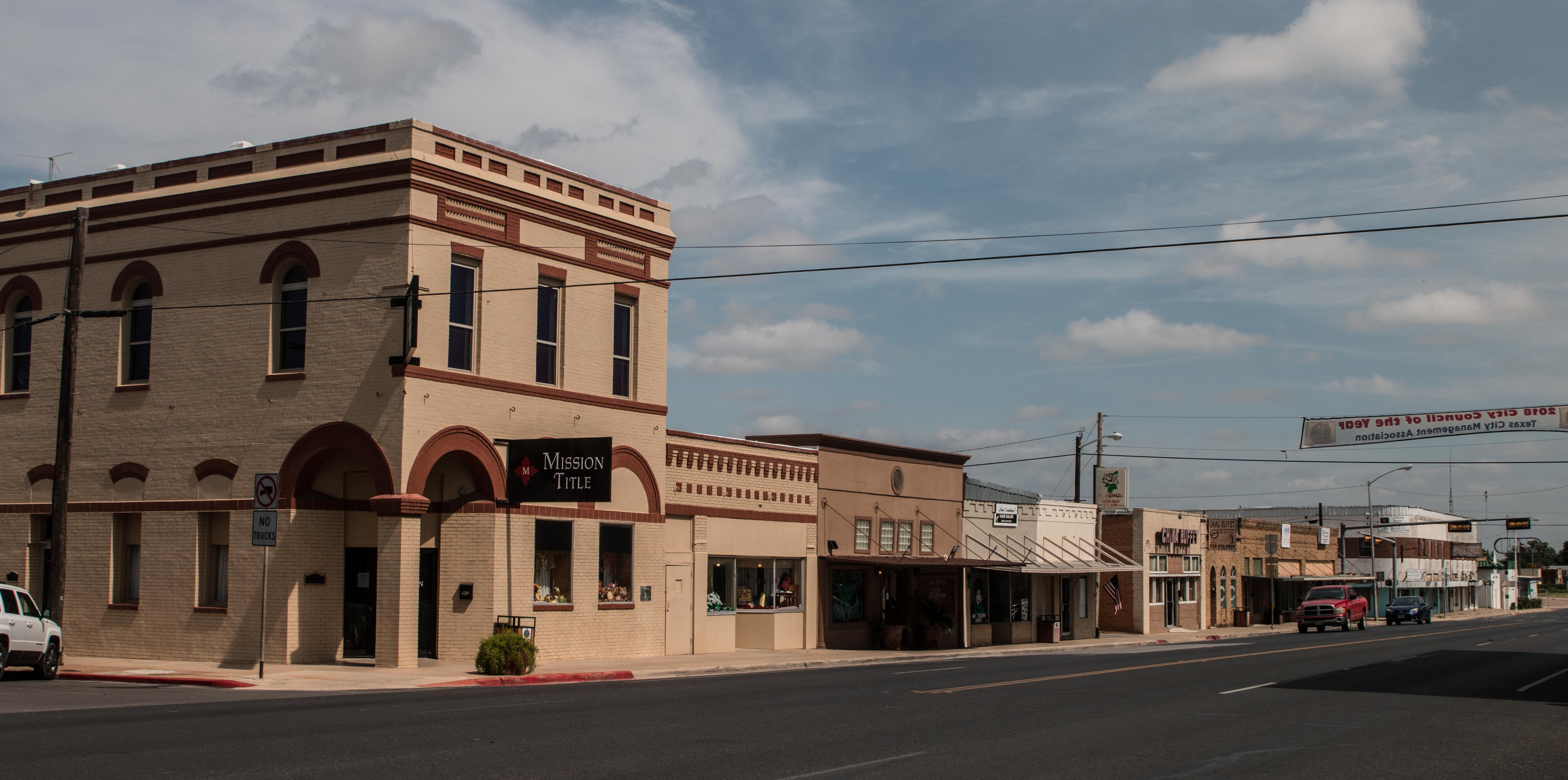
- Downtown Pearsall

- Location of Pearsall, Texas
- Coordinates: 28°53′29″N 99°06′32″W
- Country: United States
- State: Texas
- County: Frio

Area
  - Total: 6.56 sq mi (17.00 km^{2})
  - Land: 6.55 sq mi (16.96 km^{2})
  - Water: 0.015 sq mi (0.04 km^{2})
- Elevation: 623 ft (190 m)

Population (2020)
  - Total: 7,325
  - Density: 1,119/sq mi (431.9/km^{2})
- Time zone: UTC-6 (Central (CST))
  - Summer (DST): UTC-5 (CDT)
- ZIP code: 78061
- Area code: 830
- FIPS code: 48-56384
- GNIS feature ID: 2411393
- Website: cityofpearsall.org

Pearsall (/ˈpɪərsɔːl/ PEER-sawl) is a city in and the county seat of Frio County, Texas, United States. The population was 7,325 at the 2020 census, down from 9,146 at the 2010 census.

== Geography ==
Pearsall is located near the center of Frio County. Interstate 35 bypasses the city on the west side, with access from Exits 99, 101, and 104. I-35 leads northeast 55 mi (89 km) to San Antonio and south 100 mi (160 km) to Laredo.

According to the United States Census Bureau, Pearsall has a total area of 5.9 square miles (15.4 km^{2}), of which 0.02 square miles (0.04 km^{2}), or 0.27%, is covered by water.

In 2003, Pearsall annexed the unincorporated neighborhood of West Pearsall, increasing the population of the town by approximately 350 people.

=== Climate ===
The climate in this area is characterized by hot, humid summers and generally mild to cool winters. According to the Köppen climate classification, Pearsall has a humid subtropical climate, Cfa on climate maps.

== Demographics ==
Historical population
Census	Pop.	Note	%±
1890	766		—
1910	1,799		—
1920	2,161		20.1%
1930	2,536		17.4%
1940	1,198		−52.8%
1950	2,029		69.4%
1960	3,470		71.0%
1970	5,545		59.8%
1980	7,383		33.1%
1990	6,924		−6.2%
2000	7,157		3.4%
2010	9,146		27.8%
2020	7,325		−19.9%
2022 (est.)	8,878		21.2%
U.S. Decennial Census

=== 2020 census ===
As of the 2020 census, there were 7,325 people and 1,845 families residing in the city. The median age was 35.7 years. 28.4% of residents were under the age of 18 and 16.5% of residents were 65 years of age or older. For every 100 females there were 94.1 males, and for every 100 females age 18 and over there were 91.1 males age 18 and over.

94.6% of residents lived in urban areas, while 5.4% lived in rural areas.

There were 2,475 households in Pearsall, of which 40.1% had children under the age of 18 living in them. Of all households, 42.6% were married-couple households, 17.2% were households with a male householder and no spouse or partner present, and 32.9% were households with a female householder and no spouse or partner present. About 24.0% of all households were made up of individuals and 11.9% had someone living alone who was 65 years of age or older.

There were 2,916 housing units, of which 15.1% were vacant. The homeowner vacancy rate was 1.3% and the rental vacancy rate was 8.8%.

Racial composition as of the 2020 census
Race	Number	Percent
White	3,608	49.3%
Black or African American	49	0.7%
American Indian and Alaska Native	68	0.9%
Asian	13	0.2%
Native Hawaiian and Other Pacific Islander	7	0.1%
Some other race	1,457	19.9%
Two or more races	2,123	29.0%
Hispanic or Latino (of any race)	6,377	87.1%

=== 2000 census ===
As of the census of 2000, 7,157 people, 2,201 households, and 1,688 families were living in the city. The population density was 1,694.7 inhabitants per square mile (654.3/km^{2}). The 2,470 housing units averaged 584.9/sq mi (226.0/km^{2}). The racial makeup of the city was 73.80% White, 0.39% African American 0.71% Native American, 0.28% Asian, 22.02% from other races, and 2.79% from two or more races. About 84.24% of the population was Hispanic or Latino of any race.

Of the 2,201 households, 41.4% had children under the age of 18 living with them, 53.1% were married couples living together, 18.2% had a female householder with no husband present, and 23.3% were not families. About 20.8% of all households were made up of individuals, and 9.9% had someone living alone who was 65 years of age or older. The average household size was 2.99 and the average family size was 3.47.

In the city, the age distribution was 30.6% under 18, 10.4% from 18 to 24, 26.9% from 25 to 44, 19.7% from 45 to 64, and 12.4% who were 65 or older. The median age was 31 years. For every 100 females, there were 102.6 males. For every 100 females age 18 and over, there were 103.2 males.

The median income for a household in the city was $21,602, and for a family was $23,470. Males had a median income of $21,295 versus $14,720 for females. The per capita income for the city was $13,383. 35.0% of the population and 30.4% of families were below the poverty line. 43.2% of those under the age of 18 and 40.0% of those 65 and older were living below the poverty line.

== Government and infrastructure ==
The United States Postal Service operates the Pearsall Post Office.

The U.S. Immigration and Customs Enforcement operates the South Texas Detention Facility in an unincorporated area in Frio County near Pearsall.

== Education ==
Pearsall Independent School District has four schools: Ted Flores Elementary, Pearsall Intermediate, Pearsall Junior High, and Pearsall High School.

== Notable people ==
- Alfred Allee, a 19th-century peace officer, was at one time a deputy sheriff in Pearsall
- Gene Bailey, baseball player
- Mary Moore, former mayor
- George Strait, country music singer, was born in Poteet, Texas, but raised in Pearsall
- Dave Studdard, professional football player, offensive lineman Denver Broncos (1979–1988)
- Brad Wright, head football coach at Texas State University-San Marcos from 2007 to 2010

== Gallery ==
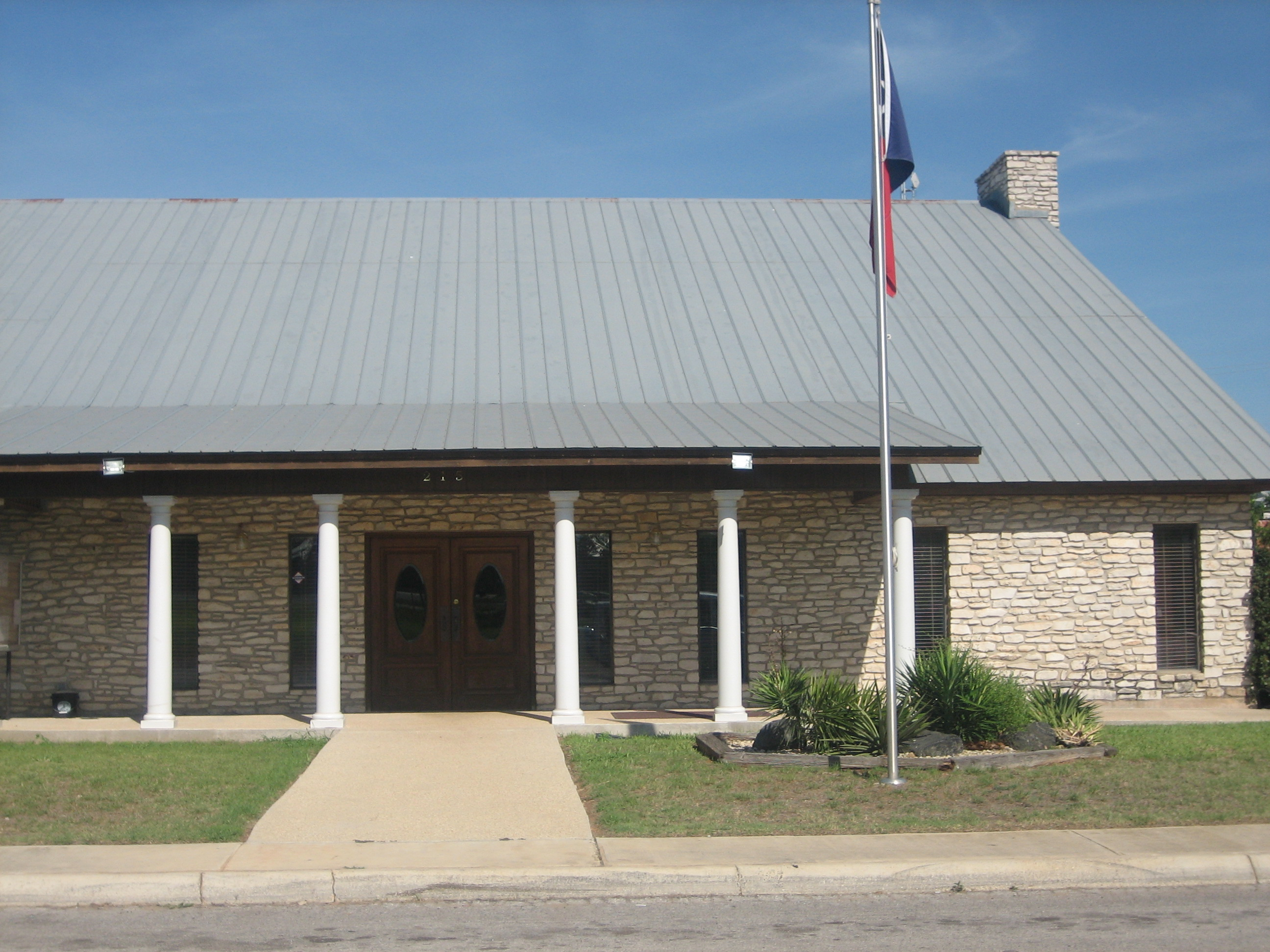
Pearsall Town Hall

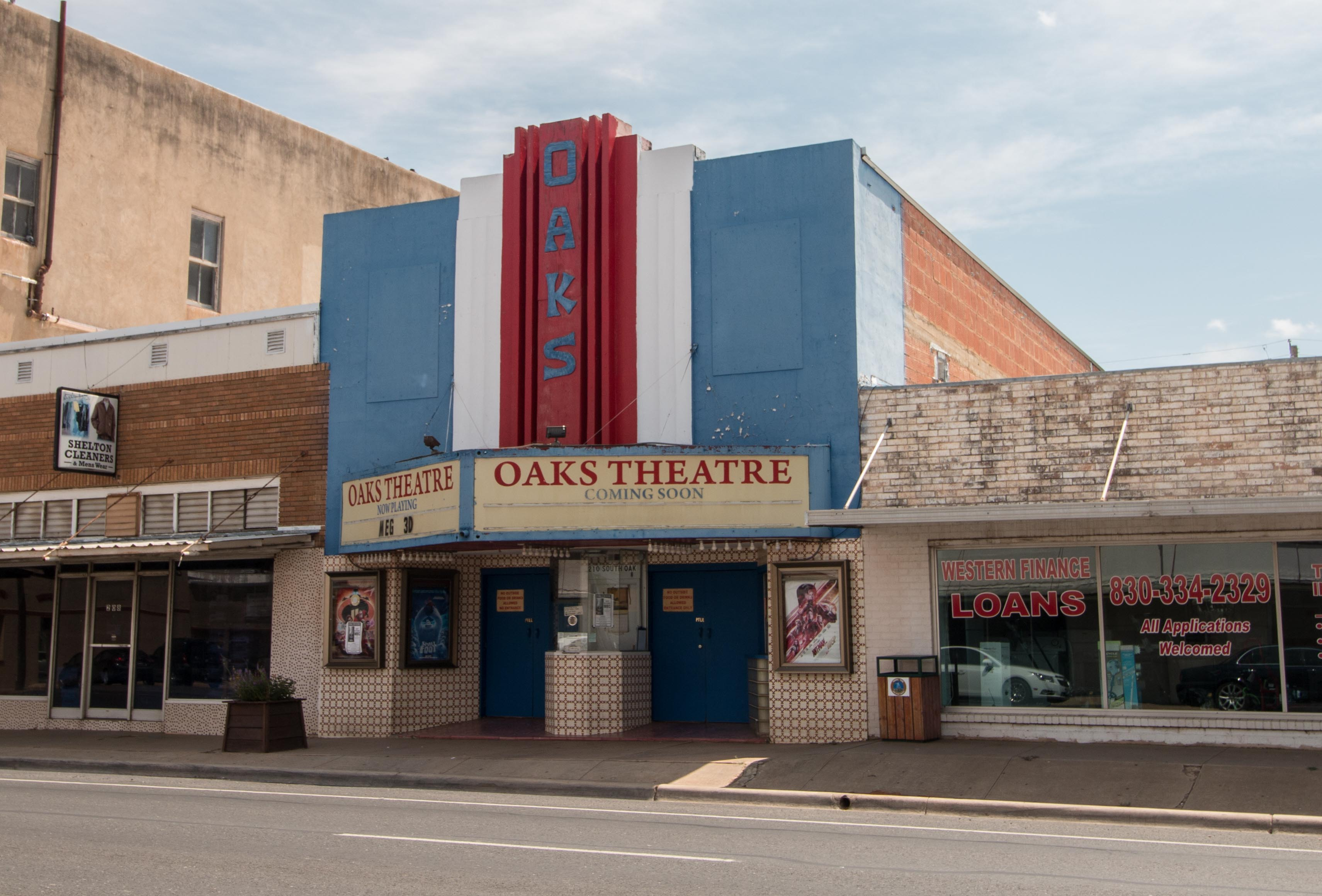
Oaks Theater

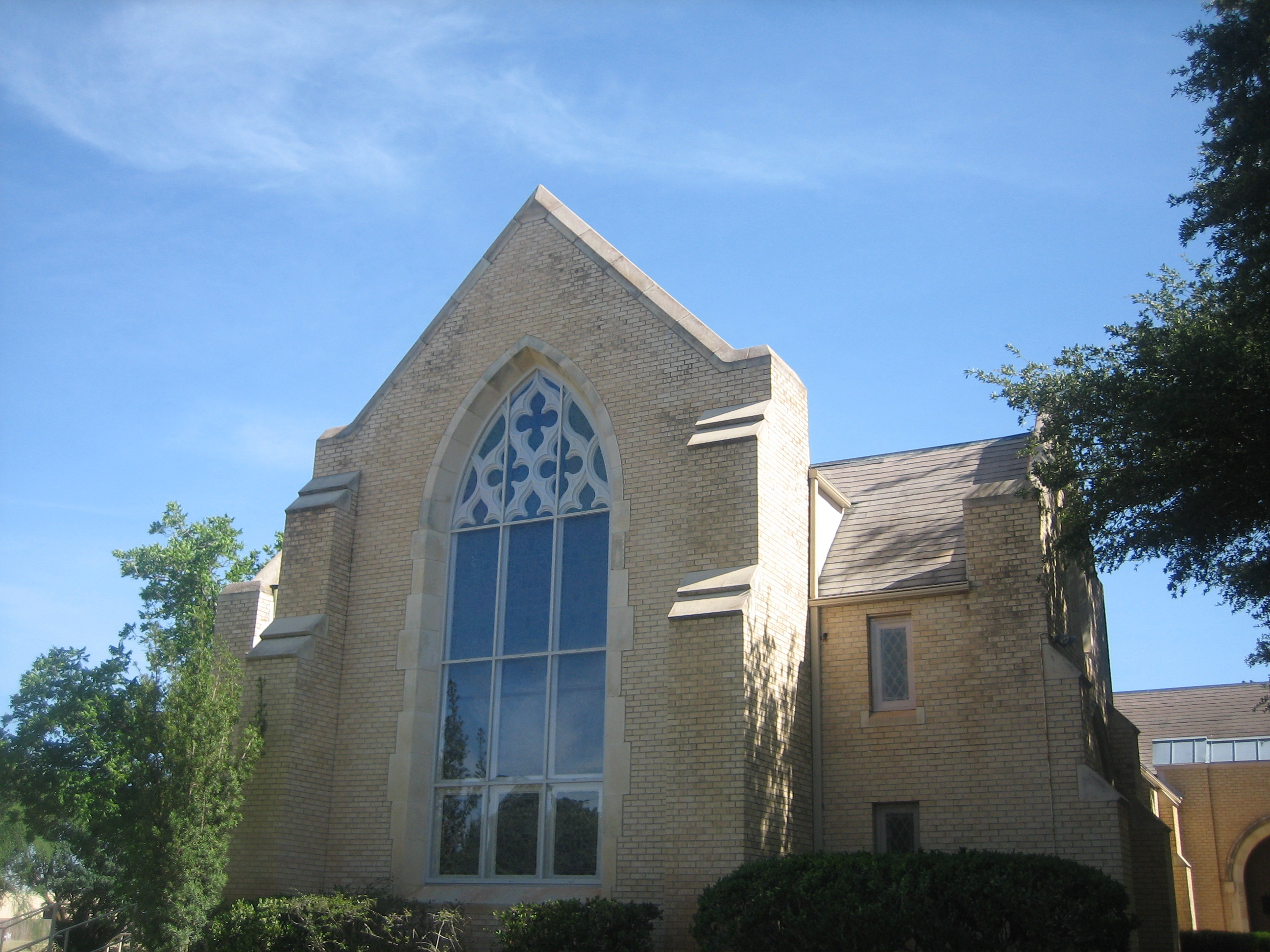
First United Methodist located across from the courthouse

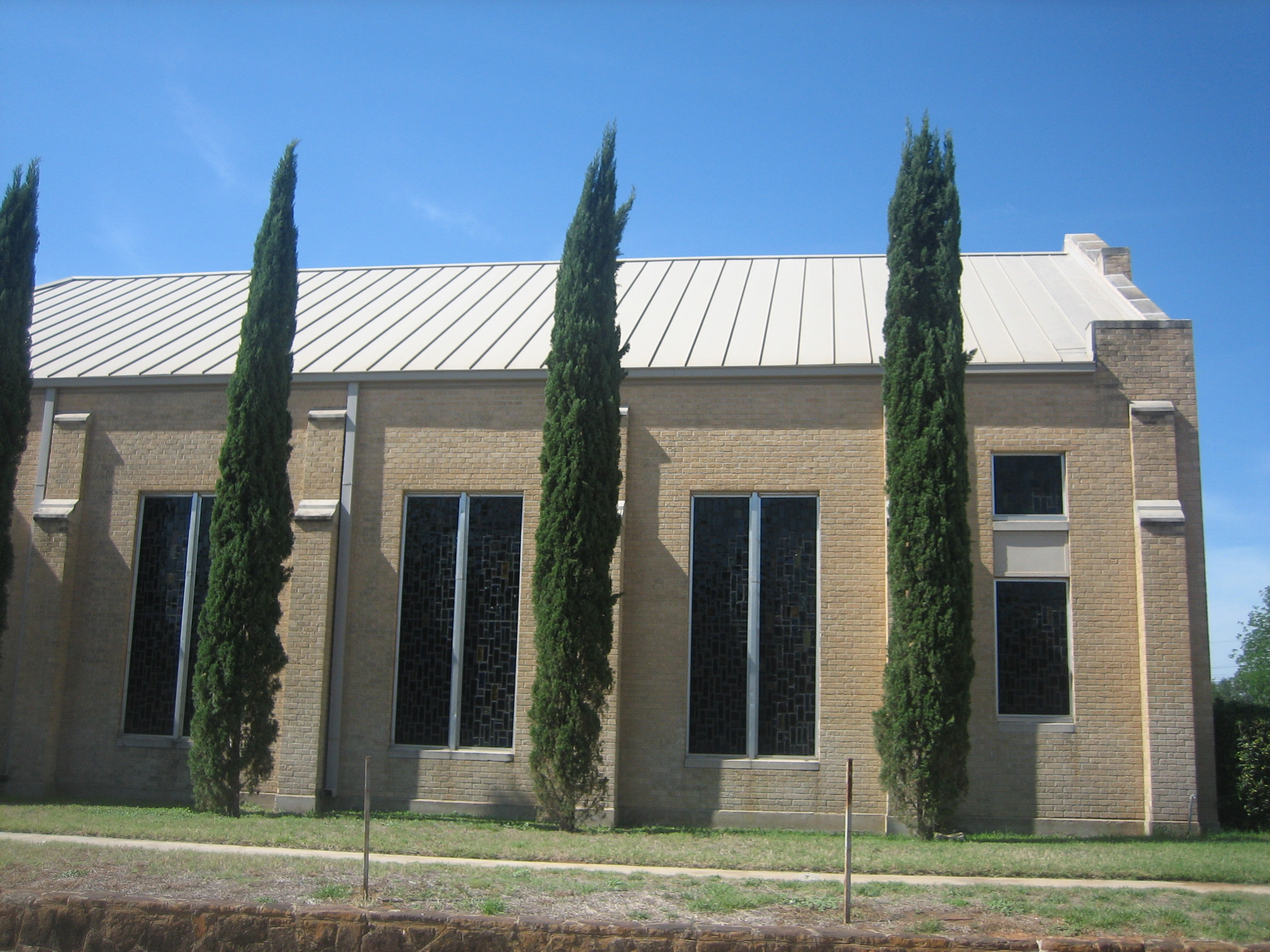
First Baptist Church of Pearsall located at Walnut and San Marcos streets

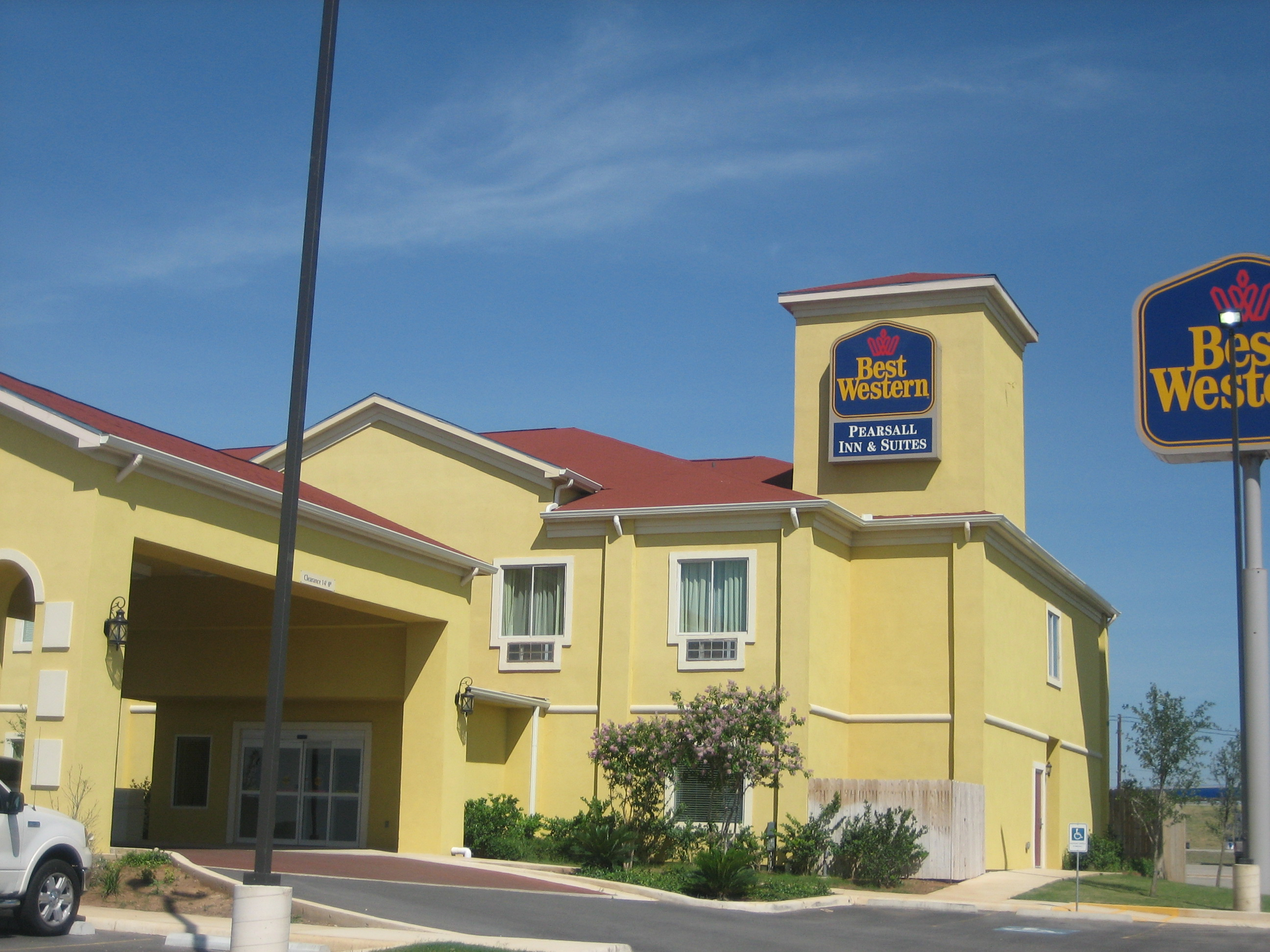
Best Western

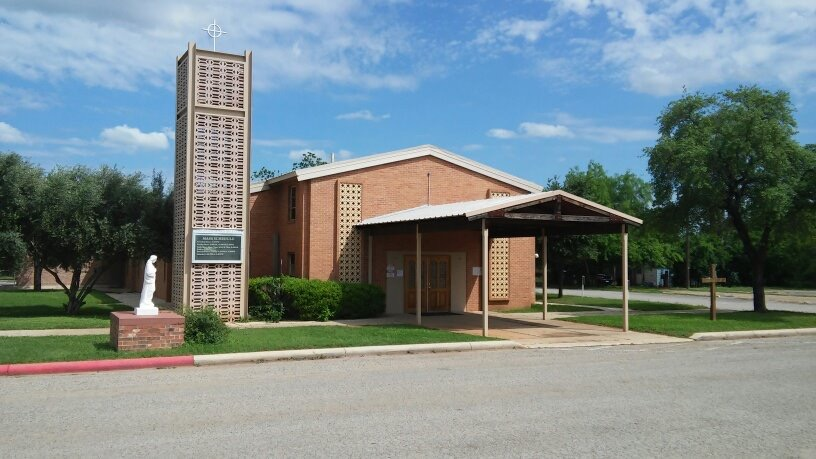
Catholic Church in Pearsall, Texas, located on corner of Brazos and Willow

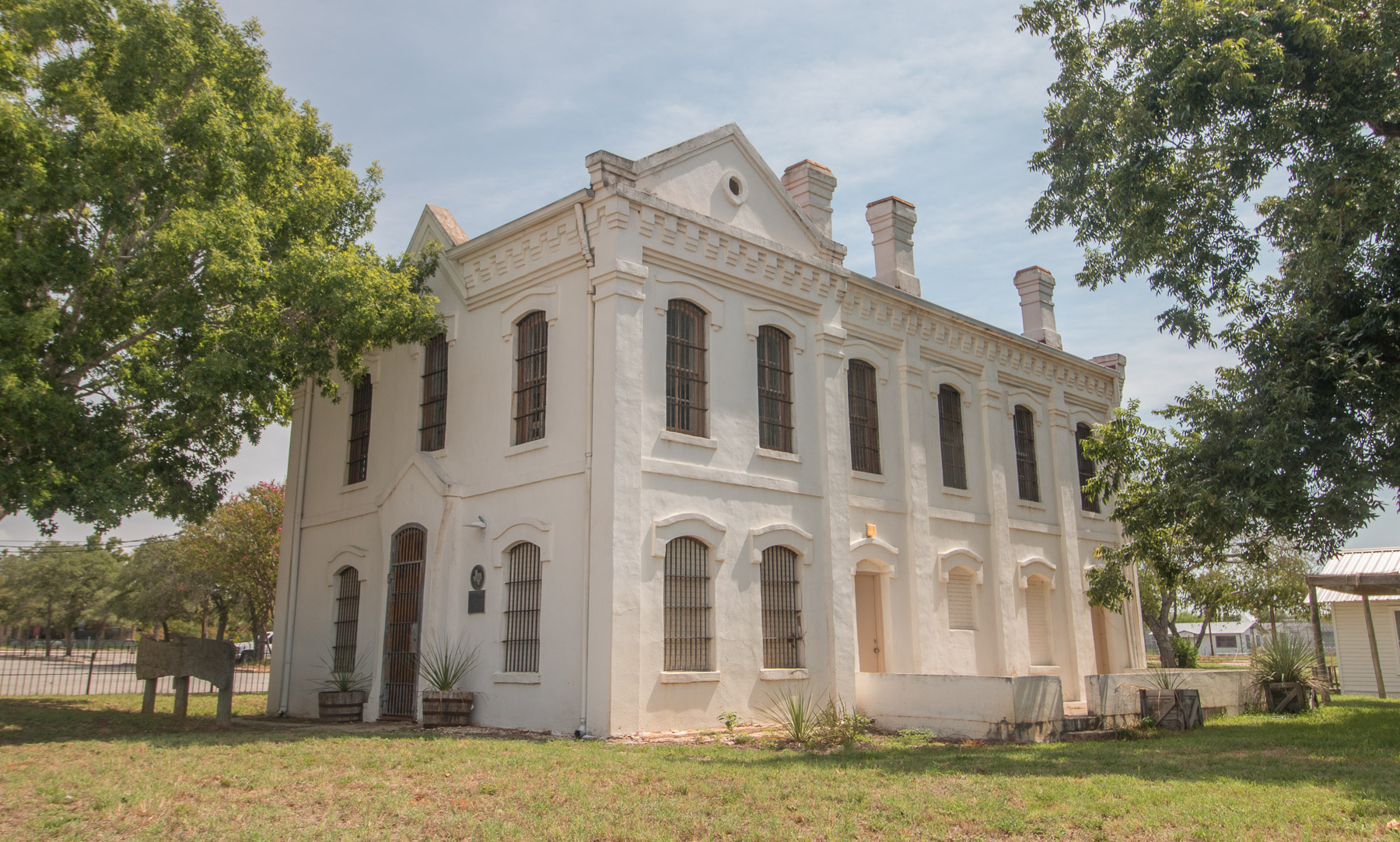
Old Frio County Jail

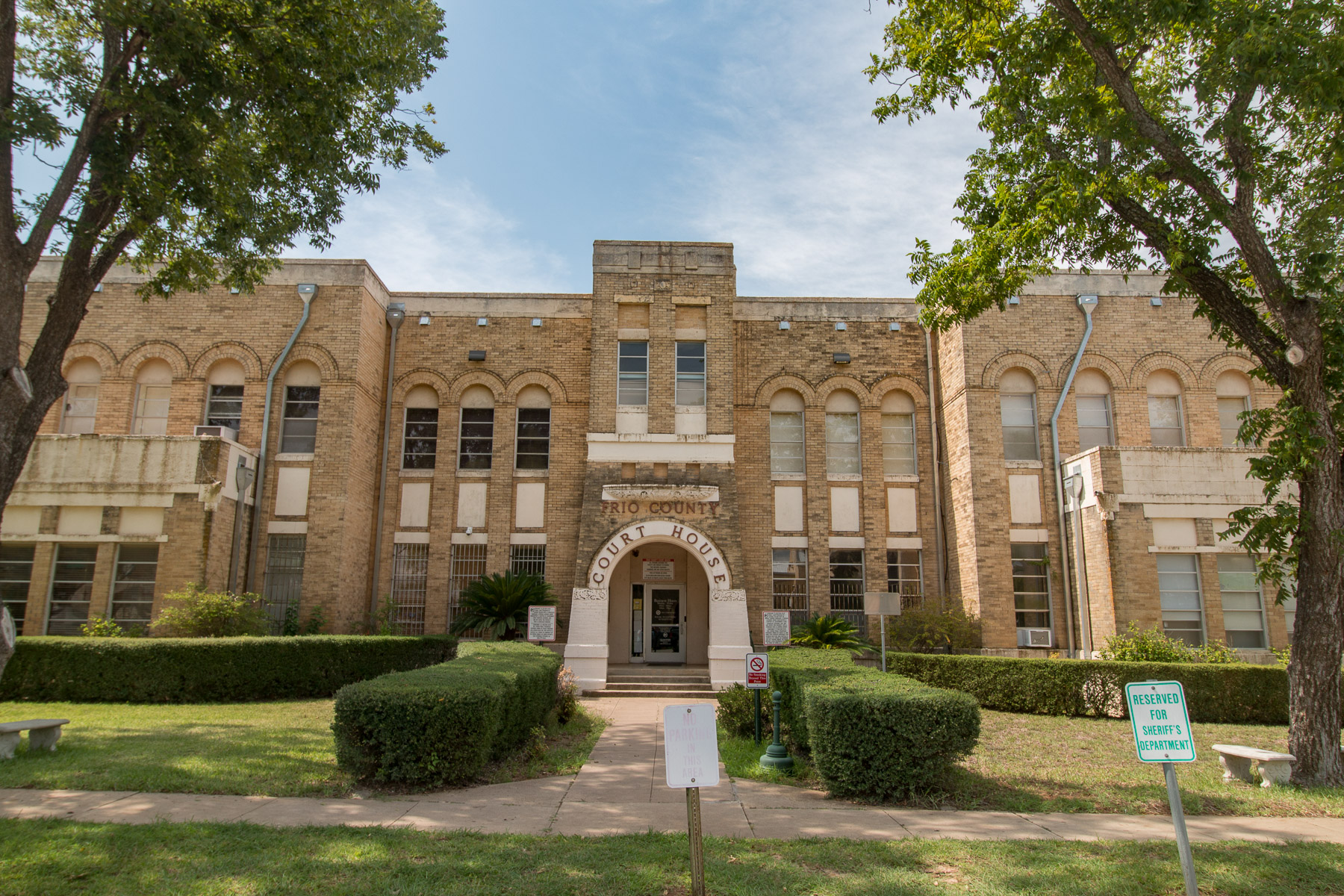
Frio County Courthouse
