= Linscott =

Linscott may refer to:

- Linscott, Nebraska
- Linscott (surname), people named Linscott

== See also ==
- Williams-Linscott House
