= National Register of Historic Places listings in Loving County, Texas =

Location of Loving County in Texas

This is a list of the National Register of Historic Places listings in Loving County, Texas.

This is intended to be a complete list of properties and districts listed on the National Register of Historic Places in Loving County, Texas. With a 2020 population of 64 residents, Loving County is the least populous county in the United States. Despite its small size, the county has one historic property listed on the National Register.

This National Park Service list is complete through NPS recent listings posted October 2, 2026.

== Current listings ==
The locations of National Register properties may be seen in a mapping service provided.

	Name on the Register	Image	Date listed	Location	City or town	Description
1	Loving County Courthouse	Loving County Courthouse	May 10, 2006 (#06000362)	Bounded by Pecos St., Collins St., Dallas St., and TX 302; 31°42′23″N 103°35′55″W	Mentone	

== See also ==
- National Register of Historic Places listings in Texas
- Recorded Texas Historic Landmarks in Loving County
