= List of first female sheriffs in the United States =

As of 2026, 47 of 50 U.S. states have had a female county sheriff. Most early female sheriffs were widows appointed to fill out the unexpired term of a spouse. The first female sheriff was appointed in Missouri in 1895, and such occurrences, while still not common, became more prevalent by the 1920s. The first female sheriff to be elected to office instead of only appointed occurred in 1919. 47 U.S. states elect sheriffs, and at least 43 U.S. states have elected a female sheriff.

== History ==
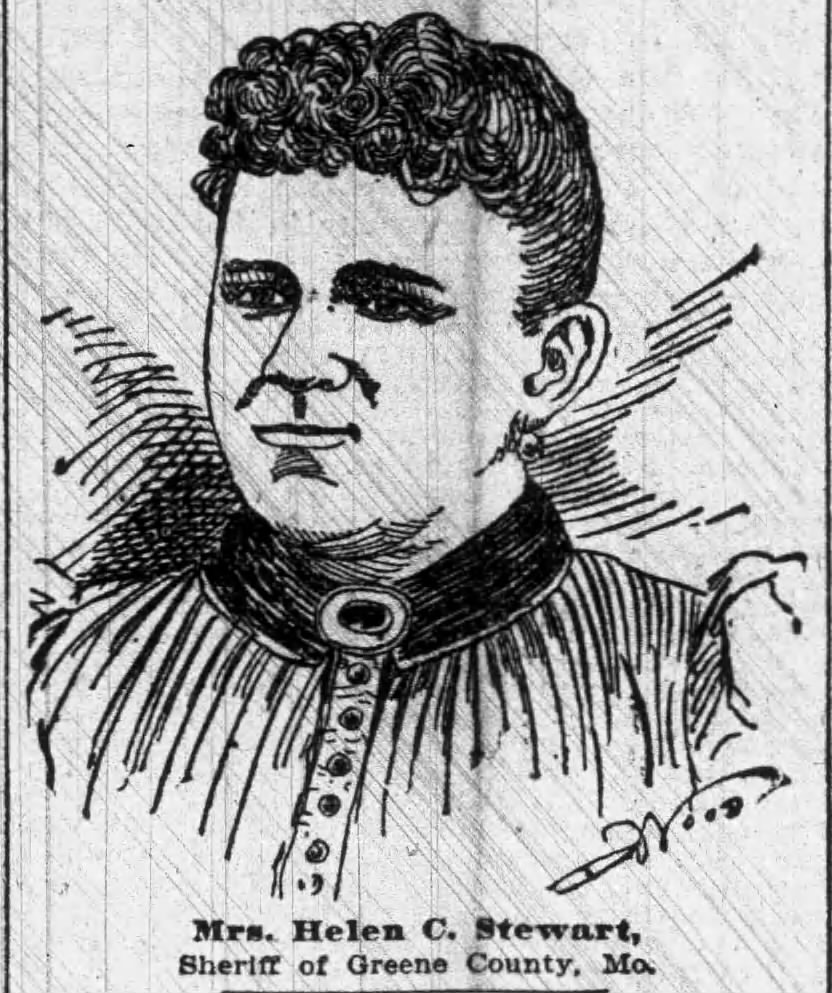
Helen C. Stewart, appointed sheriff of Greene County, Missouri, in August 1895, first female sheriff in the United States

In smaller rural counties in the United States in the late 1800s and early 1900s, it was not unusual for the wife of the sheriff to assist her husband in the running of the office by doing administrative work, overseeing jail inmates, and other tasks. For example, as far back as 1870, newspapers reported that a Mrs. J.H. Latty of Des Moines County, Iowa, in working with her husband sheriff, was in effect "a woman sheriff, or at least a woman Deputy Sheriff," and described her management of the county jail, foiling of a prisoner escape attempt, flogging prisoners for using "profane and boisterous language", and delivering a prisoner to the state penitentiary by herself. Since the wives of sheriffs knew about all aspects of the job of being sheriff, when a sheriff unexpectedly died either through illness or in the line of duty, in some cases a sheriff's widow would be appointed to fill an unexpired term, or until a special election could be held.

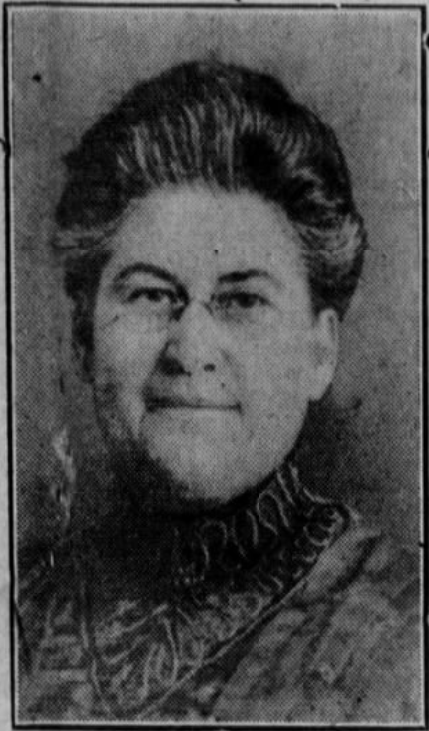
Cora Kilborn, first woman sheriff in Kansas, appointed November 1918

The first woman who officially served as sheriff in any state in the United States was Helen C. Stewart in Greene County, Missouri, who was appointed on 9 August 1895 after her husband died of illness. She was only to serve until a special election could be held the next month, but the decision of who to appoint was hotly debated. The deceased sheriff had a son who was not yet 21, and doubts were raised as to whether a woman—who could not vote—could legally serve as sheriff. The three county judges who had to make the decision of who to appoint eventually voted for the widow, with one judge abstaining. Her brief tenure in office was controversial. When "Mrs. Sheriff Stewart" fired the county jailor, who was the brother of the abstaining judge, he refused to confirm her replacement. But another of the county judges eventually allowed the appointment. Stewart's appointment drew brief national attention. Though most newspapers just pointed to the novelty of the event, the Atlanta Constitution was compelled to speak out, crying that a "community which chooses a woman for sheriff is marching back into a state of barbarism." The Cleveland Plain-Dealer found that absurd: "What particular era, epoch, age or condition of barbarism had women sheriffs? Are why are you afraid of a woman sheriff, anyway?"

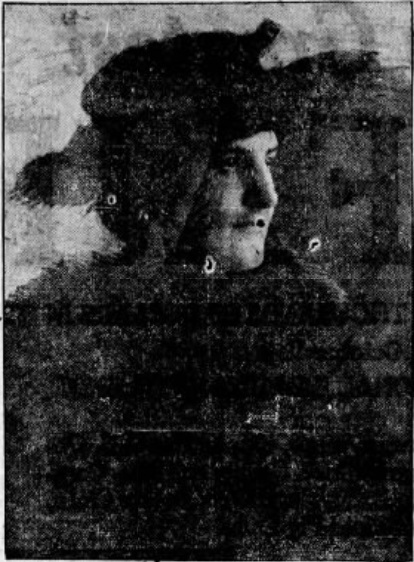
Mary Myrtle Siler became first female sheriff in North Carolina in 1920.

Stewart's appointment in 1895 remained an outlier until the late 1910s, though Missouri again briefly appointed a woman sheriff in 1912, when Nancy H. Williams took office in Laclede County, Missouri after her husband died. However, a growing number of women began to be hired as deputy sheriffs in the 1900s and 1910s.

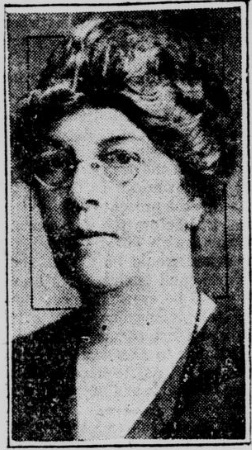
Clara Senecal, appointed first female sheriff in New York in 1926.

The appointment of Emma Daugherty Banister in Coleman County, Texas in August 1918 after her husband's death began a long line of increasing appointments into the 1920s and beyond. And in 1919, with Missouri again leading the way, Minnie Mae Talbott became the first woman elected to the office of sheriff in the United States, in a special election to replace her husband who had been killed on duty. While the women's suffrage campaign was getting closing to success, Talbott's 1919 election was by an all-male electorate. By 1930, at least 25 U.S. states had had a woman sheriff. While most had been appointed to replace dead husbands, a few had won an election after their appointment, or were elected to succeed a still-living husband, oftentimes because their husband was term-limited.

As of 2026, it appears that three states have never had a female sheriff, though women have served in other high ranking law enforcement positions. These are Delaware (where sheriffs do not engage in typical law enforcement work) and Wyoming (which did have the first female governor in the United States in 1925 with Nellie Tayloe Ross, who was elected to replace her dead husband), as well as Alaska (which does not have sheriffs, as the state does not have a county system of government).

The below chart lists the first known woman sheriff to serve in each U.S. state, regardless of whether they took office by appointment or election. The novelty of a woman serving as sheriff typically garnered news headlines, but newspapers have often made incorrect claims that an appointment was first in a state, overlooking prior appointments. Thus, while every entry in this list is supported by sources, there is the possibility that earlier cases may still be identified in some states. As far as is possible, the listed date of each entry is for the date an appointment occurred, or the date that an election occurred, even if the person was sworn in or took office at a later date.

Following this chart is a chart of the first known female sheriff to be elected in each U.S. state.

== First Female Sheriff To Serve In Each U.S. State (whether appointed or elected) ==
#	Date	Name	State	County	Form	Notes	Cites
1	9 August 1895	Helen C. Stewart	Missouri	Greene	Appointed	Husband sheriff died of illness	
2	5 August 1918	Emma Daugherty Banister	Texas	Coleman	Appointed	Husband sheriff died of stroke	
3	30 November 1918	Cora E. Walson Kilborn	Kansas	Harper	Appointed	Husband sheriff died of illness	
4	6 March 1919	Clara Dunham Crowell	Nevada	Lander	Appointed	Husband sheriff died of illness. Served 22 months.	
5	3 May 1920	Florence Cates	Oklahoma	Stephens	Appointed	Husband sheriff died of illness	
6	4 October 1920	Mary Myrtle Siler	North Carolina	Chatham	Appointed	Cousin sheriff resigned	
7	2 November 1920	Estella Gates; Jane Johnson	Michigan	Benzie; Roscommon	Elected	Succeeded husbands as elected sheriff	
8	8 December 1920	Maybel Woodford Simpson	Oregon	Lincoln	Appointed	Husband sheriff died of illness. Served 2 years.	
9	3 January 1921	Ruth Garfield	Montana	Golden Valley	Appointed	Husband sheriff died of gunshot	
10	4 May 1921	Gunda Martindale	Iowa	Allamakee	Appointed	Husband sheriff died	
11	11 March 1922	Lois Roach	Kentucky	Graves	Appointed, then elected	Husband sheriff shot. Served until 1927	
12	April 1922	Sadie E. Munroe	Minnesota	Lyon	Appointed	Husband sheriff died	
13	31 July 1922	Willie Clara Murphy	Arkansas	Desha	Appointed	Sheriff died, Murphy was chief deputy	
14	20 September 1922	Ella White	Indiana	Clark County	Appointed, lost election bid	Husband sheriff died	
15	30 August 1923	Mabel V. Gray	Pennsylvania	Lycoming	Appointed	Husband sheriff died	
16	25 January 1924	Frankie Freese	Ohio	Crawford	Appointed	Husband sheriff died	
17	28 January 1924	Mrs. J.F. Casselberry	Tennessee	Hardeman	Appointed	Husband sheriff died	
18	8 February 1924	Ella McCoy Gilbert	Louisiana	Franklin	Appointed	Husband sheriff died	
19	March 1924	Emma Marion Leonard	Wisconsin	Langlade	Appointed	Husband sheriff died	
20	Later in 1924	Bessie Stultz Strickler	Virginia	Henry	Appointed	Father sheriff died	
21	10 April 1926	Clara Senecal	New York	Clinton	Appointed	Husband sheriff died	
22	November 1926	Lyda G. Larson	South Dakota	Beadle	Elected	Succeeded husband	
23	11 January 1928	Helena Dolder	Illinois	De Kalb	Appointed, then elected	Husband sheriff died	
24	16 August 1928	Pearl Richardson	Mississippi	Lawrence	Appointed	Husband sheriff died	
25	23 February 1929	Lena Keating (Note: Keating seems to be earliest appointed woman sheriff in California. However, in January 1925, Alice Rees of Sierra County, by virtue of being county coroner, was said to automatically become sheriff when the county sheriff died in January 1925. The deceased sheriff's son was appointed three days later, so Rees was never appointed or elected.)	California	Marin	Appointed	Husband sheriff died	
26	8 April 1931	Lula Duggan Camp	Georgia	Campbell	Appointed	Husband sheriff killed	
27	16 June 1932	Goldie Belle Curtis	Colorado	Crowley	Appointed	Husband sheriff went missing	
28	4 April 1933	Mayble M. Campbell	Nebraska	Hitchcock	Appointed	Husband sheriff committed suicide	
29	12 June 1934	Pearl Taylor Hickman	West Virginia	Monongalia	Appointed	Husband sheriff died	
30	29 November 1934	Bertha Regan	North Dakota	Ramsey	Appointed	Husband sheriff died	
31	23 August 1935	Mae Gasque	South Carolina	Marion	Appointed	Husband sheriff died	
32	20 November 1936	Belle Talley	Arizona	Graham	Appointed	Husband sheriff died	
33	27 January 1938	Eugenia Simmons	Florida	Okeechobee	Appointed	Husband sheriff died of illness	
34	11 April 1938	Linnie Thomas	New Mexico	Curry	Appointed	Husband sheriff died of illness	
35	3 May 1938	Jessie Welch Austin	Alabama	Elmore	Elected	Succeeded term-limited husband	
36	7 August 1939	Irene Borden	Washington	Skamania	Appointed, then elected	Husband sheriff died	
37	7 September 1944	Helen M. Kelley	New Hampshire	Merrimack	Appointed	Replaced retiring sheriff	
38	19 February 1951	Victoria Kuuleialoha Holt	Hawaii	Territory	Appointed	Incumbent sheriff died	
39	5 November 1974	Gloria Rice Clark	Connecticut	Fairfield	Elected	Defeated incumbent	
40	8 November 1977	Ruth S. Carpenter	New Jersey	Hunterdon	Elected	Incumbent sheriff died	
41	2 November 1982	Virginia Donnelly	Maryland	Howard	Elected, defeated incumbent in primary	Sworn in 5 December 1982	
42	24 November 2000	Ann M. Castelli	Rhode Island	Kent	Appointed	Incumbent retired	
43	5 November 2002	Shiela Prue; Connie Allen	Vermont	Windham; Grand Isle	Elected	Prue won contested race Allen ran unopposed	
44	19 November 2002	Andrea Cabral	Massachusetts	Suffolk	Appointed, later elected	Incumbent resigned	
45	2 November 2004	Patti Bolen; Elaine Savage	Idaho	Valley; Bonner	Elected		
46	7 November 2006	Donna Dennison	Maine	Knox	Elected	Term started 1 Jan 2007	
47	16 August 2017	Rosie Rivera	Utah	Salt Lake	Appointed, then elected		
		None	Delaware			Has limited powers	
		None	Wyoming				
		None	Alaska			Office does not exist	

== First Female Sheriffs Elected In Each U.S. State ==
The following table lists the first female to be elected sheriff in each U.S. State. Almost of all of these cases prior to the 1970s involve a wife being elected after previously being appointed to fill the unexpired term of her dead husband, or being elected because her husband was term-limited but could effectively continue in office by serving as a deputy to his wife. In 1945, Edna Reed DeWees was first appointed and then elected sheriff of Loving County, Texas (1940 population of 285), which may be the first case of the election of a female sheriff independent of any spouse. Some elections in recent decades may note when a female sheriff is the "first elected" in a state based on their own record unconnected to succeeding or replacing a husband, such as when Sylvia Boma was elected sheriff of La Crosse County, Wisconsin in 1982, or Susan Benton was elected in Highlands County, Florida in 2004.

At least 43 U.S. states have elected a female sheriff. Alaska does not have sheriffs, and Rhode Island and Hawaii only appoint sheriffs.

#	Date	Name	State	County	Form	Notes	Cites
1	29 May 1919	Minnie Mae Talbott	Missouri	Lafayette	Elected, succeeded killed husband	First female elected sheriff in U.S.	
2	2 November 1920	Estella Gates; Jane Johnson	Michigan	Benzie; Roscommon	Elected; succeeded husbands	First female to serve in state	
3	4 August 1923	Lois Roach	Kentucky	Graves	Elected after appointment, husband killed	First female to serve in state	
4	April 1924	Eudora Day	Louisiana	East Baton Rogue	Elected after appointment, husband killed	Second female to serve in state	
5	November 1924	Hannah C. Saunders	Wisconsin	Burnett	Elected, succeeded husband	Second female to serve in state	
6	November 1926	Lyda G. Larson	South Dakota	Beadle	Elected, succeeded husband	First female to serve in state	
7	2 November 1926	Mabel Chase	Kansas	Kansas	Elected, succeeded husband		
7	2 November 1926	Maude Collins	Ohio	Ohio	Elected after appointment, husband killed		
9	10 April 1928	Helena Dolder	Illinois	De Kalb	Elected after appointment, husband died	First female to serve in state	
10	2 August 1928	Laura Mason	Tennessee	Wilson	Elected after appointment, husband died		
11	3 May 1938	Jessie Welch Austin	Alabama	Elmore	Elected, succeeded husband	First female to serve in state	
12	5 November 1940	Irene Borden	Washington	Skamania	Elected after appointment, husband died	First female to serve in state	
13	1941	Josie May Rogers	Georgia	Evans	Elected after appointment, father sheriff died		
14	July 1945	Edna Reed DeWees	Texas	Loving	Elected after appointment	Prior sheriff resigned	
15	May 1946	Marguerite Pridgen Baldree	Florida	Sumter	Elected after appointment, husband died		
16	5 November 1946	Maggie Hale	North Dakota	Bowman	Elected, succeeded term-limited husband		
17	14 March 1950	Anna Mae Isabel Herrington	Mississippi	Newton	Elected, succeeded husband		
18	November 1961	Virginia Chambers	West Virginia	Mingo	Elected, succeeded husband and ineligible son		
19	8 November 1966	Doris McCarty	New Mexico	Hidalgo	Elected, succeeded husband		
20	3 November 1970	Jean Gertzen	Montana	Glacier	Elected after appointment		
21	5 November 1974	Gloria Rice Clark	Connecticut	Fairfield	Elected	First female to serve in state	
22	2 November 1976	Sarah N. Carter	Nevada	Esmeralda	Elected	Term started January 1977	
23	8 November 1977	Ruth S. Carpenter	New Jersey	Hunterdon	Elected	First female to serve in state	
24	7 November 1978	Marietta Hardy	Indiana	Scott	Elected, succeeded term-limited husband	Sworn in 1 Jan 1979	
25	1982	Sue Kurtz	Colorado	San Juan	Elected after appointment		
26	2 November 1982	Virginia Donnelly	Maryland	Howard	Elected	Also first to serve in state	
27	November 1992	Sue Pridgen	Arkansas	Saline	Elected		
28	2 November 1993	Michelle Mitchell	Virginia	Richmond City	Elected		
29	1993	Ann Osborne	Pennsylvania	Delaware	Elected in 1993 after 1991 appointment	Earliest located to date; reporting does not say first	
30	8 November 1994	Barbara Pickens	North Carolina	Lincoln	Elected		
31	27 August 1996	Rita Duncan	Oklahoma	Pushmataha	Elected		
32	2 June 1998	Virginia Black	California	Yuba	Elected	Sworn in 4 Jan 1999	
33	5 November 2002	Shiela Prue; Connie Allen	Vermont	Windham; Grand Isle	Elected	First females to serve in state	
34	5 November 2002	Terese Amazi	Minnesota	Mower	Elected		
35	2 November 2004	Andrea Cabral	Massachusetts	Suffolk	Elected after Nov 2002 appointment	First female to serve in state	
36	2 November 2004	Patti Bolen; Elaine Savage	Idaho	Valley; Bonner	Elected	First females to serve in state	
37	7 November 2006	Donna Dennison	Maine	Knox	Elected, term started 1 Jan 2007	First female to serve in state	
38	7 November 2006	Jayme Reed; Tammy Mowry	Nebraska	Pawnee; Box Butte	Elected	Took office 1 January 2007	
39	7 November 2006	Diana Simpson	Oregon	Benton	Elected	Took office 2 January 2007	
40	November 2014	Colleen M. O'Neill	New York	Jefferson	Elected		
41	November 2018	Rosie Rivera	Utah	Salt Lake	Elected after Aug 2017 appointment	First female to serve	
42	4 November 2020	Kristin Graziano	South Carolina	Charleston			
43	November 2024	Kathryn Mone	New Hampshire	Stafford	Elected	Earliest located to date; reporting does not say first	
		None	Arizona				
		None	Delaware			Has limited powers	
		None	Iowa			None identified	
		None	Wyoming				
		None	Alaska			Office does not exist	
		None	Hawaii			Hawaii only appoints sheriffs	
		None	Rhode Island			Rhode Island only appoints sheriffs	
