= Brewster, Nebraska =

Village in Nebraska, US

- Village
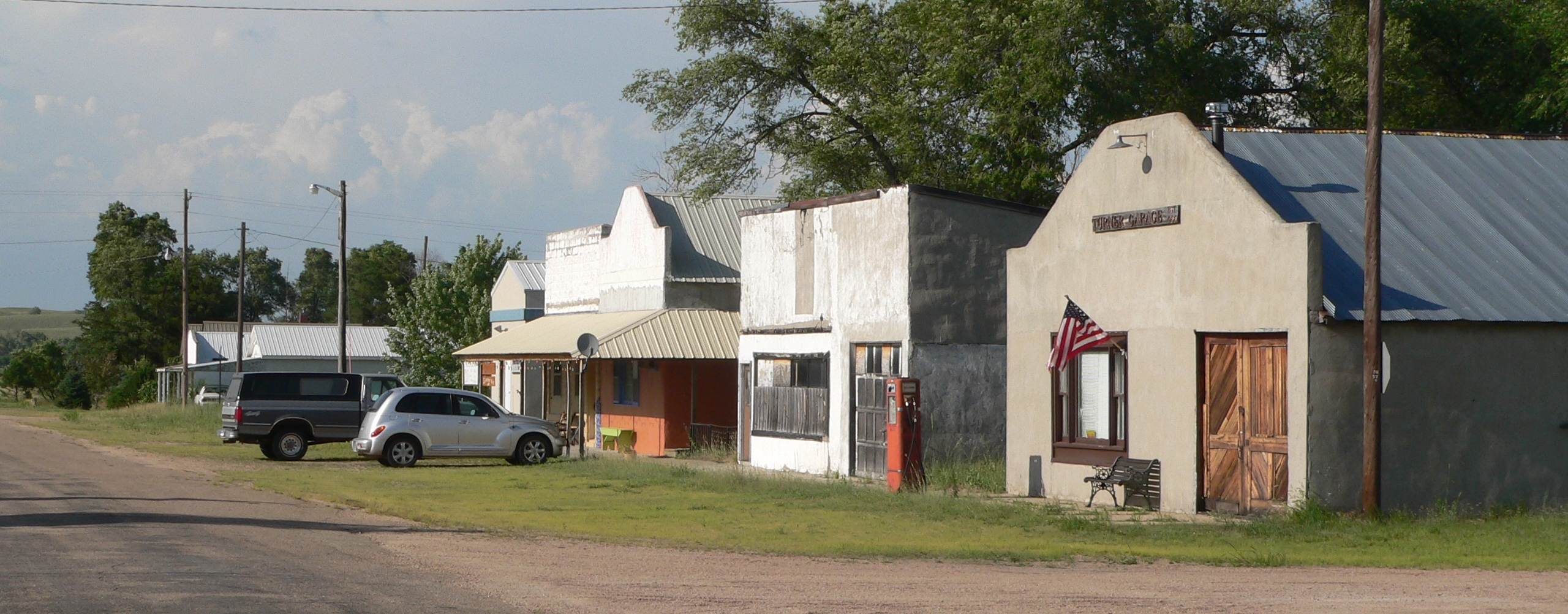
- Downtown Brewster

- Location of Brewster, Nebraska
- Coordinates: 41°56′18″N 99°51′54″W
- Country: United States
- State: Nebraska
- County: Blaine

Area
  - Total: 0.089 sq mi (0.23 km^{2})
  - Land: 0.089 sq mi (0.23 km^{2})
  - Water: 0 sq mi (0.00 km^{2})
- Elevation: 2,497 ft (761 m)

Population (2020)
  - Total: 12
  - Density: 135.6/sq mi (52.35/km^{2})
- Time zone: UTC−6 (Central (CST))
  - Summer (DST): UTC−5 (CDT)
- ZIP code: 68821
- Area code: 308
- FIPS code: 31-06260
- GNIS feature ID: 2397450

Brewster is a village in and the county seat of Blaine County, Nebraska, United States. The population was 12 at the 2020 census.

== History ==
The town was laid out in 1884 by George Washington Brewster who had homesteaded the land there. It was named for one of his ancestors, William Brewster, who had arrived in America on the Mayflower. The community was named the county seat in 1887 after George Washington Brewster offered to build the required buildings. According to town lore, Brewster had expected the state capitol to be located in the community because of its central location.

In 1887 the outlaw D.C."Doc" Middleton opened a saloon in the community.

Brewster almost became a railhead, when the Chicago, Burlington and Quincy Railroad graded a line from Sargent in 1897. The line would have had an intermediate station at Moulton.

Following the 2010 census Brewster became the smallest incorporated county seat in the United States replacing Amidon, North Dakota for the title. Amidon had 26 people in 2000 and Brewster had 29. In the 2010 census Brewster had 17 while Amidon had 20.

There are two other unincorporated county seats in the same range -- Mentone, Texas (population 19), the county seat of Loving County and Gann Valley, South Dakota (population 14), the county seat of Buffalo County, South Dakota.

== Demographics ==
Historical population
Census	Pop.	Note	%±
1950	69		—
1960	44		−36.2%
1970	54		22.7%
1980	46		−14.8%
1990	22		−52.2%
2000	29		31.8%
2010	17		−41.4%
2020	12		−29.4%
U.S. Decennial Census; 2012 Estimate

=== 2010 census ===
As of the census of 2010, there were 17 people, 8 households, and 6 families residing in the village. The population density was 188.9 inhabitants per square mile (72.9/km^{2}). There were 21 housing units at an average density of 233.3 per square mile (90.1/km^{2}). The racial makeup of the village was 100.0% White.

There were 8 households, of which 12.5% had children under the age of 18 living with them, 75.0% were married couples living together, and 25.0% were non-families. 25.0% of all households were made up of individuals, and 25% had someone living alone who was 65 years of age or older. The average household size was 2.13 and the average family size was 2.50.

The median age in the village was 61.8 years. 17.6% of residents were under the age of 18; 0.1% were between the ages of 18 and 24; 5.9% were from 25 to 44; 35.3% were from 45 to 64; and 41.2% were 65 years of age or older. The gender makeup of the village was 58.8% male and 41.2% female.

=== 2000 census ===
As of the census of 2000, there were 29 people, 12 households, and 9 families residing in the village. The population density was 333.8 inhabitants per square mile (128.9/km^{2}). There were 20 housing units at an average density of 230.2 per square mile (88.9/km^{2}). The racial makeup of the village was 100.00% White.

There were 12 households, out of which 16.7% had children under the age of 18 living with them, 75.0% were married couples living together, and 16.7% were non-families. 16.7% of all households were made up of individuals, and 8.3% had someone living alone who was 65 years of age or older. The average household size was 2.42 and the average family size was 2.70.

In the village, the population was spread out, with 24.1% under the age of 18, 6.9% from 18 to 24, 20.7% from 25 to 44, 37.9% from 45 to 64, and 10.3% who were 65 years of age or older. The median age was 42 years. For every 100 females, there were 81.3 males. For every 100 females age 18 and over, there were 100.0 males.

As of 2000 the median income for a household in the village was $37,500, and the median income for a family was $51,250. Males had a median income of $26,250 versus $28,750 for females. The per capita income for the village was $12,840. There were 33.3% of families and 20.0% of the population living below the poverty line, including no under eighteens and none of those over 64.

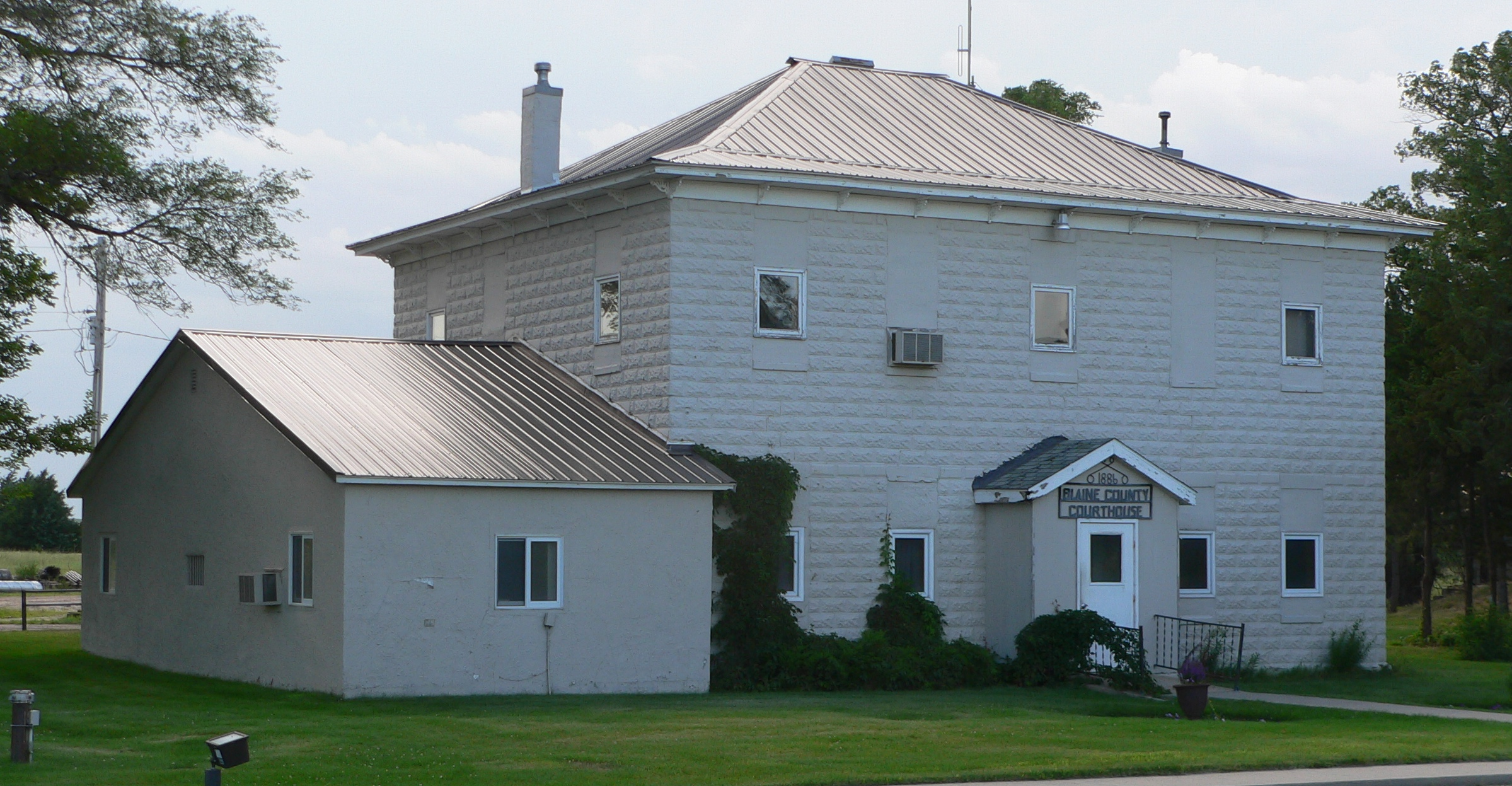
Blaine County courthouse in Brewster

== Geography ==
According to the United States Census Bureau, the village has a total area of 0.09 square miles (0.23 km^{2}), all land.

=== Climate ===
Brewster has a humid continental climate (Köppen Dfa/Dfb) with summers featuring hot afternoons, comfortable mornings, and occasional heavy rain, and winters that are generally freezing but vary from mild with chinook winds to frigid Arctic conditions.

Climate data for Brewster, Nebraska (1971–2000; extremes 1948−2001)
Month	Jan	Feb	Mar	Apr	May	Jun	Jul	Aug	Sep	Oct	Nov	Dec	Year
Record high °F (°C)	72 (22)	81 (27)	86 (30)	93 (34)	99 (37)	108 (42)	109 (43)	105 (41)	100 (38)	93 (34)	82 (28)	73 (23)	109 (43)
Mean daily maximum °F (°C)	33.9 (1.1)	39.1 (3.9)	48.7 (9.3)	60.4 (15.8)	70.7 (21.5)	81.3 (27.4)	87.3 (30.7)	85.6 (29.8)	76.8 (24.9)	64.7 (18.2)	46.8 (8.2)	37.1 (2.8)	61.0 (16.1)
Daily mean °F (°C)	20.2 (−6.6)	25.5 (−3.6)	34.7 (1.5)	45.7 (7.6)	56.6 (13.7)	66.8 (19.3)	72.7 (22.6)	70.6 (21.4)	60.7 (15.9)	48.4 (9.1)	32.8 (0.4)	23.4 (−4.8)	46.5 (8.1)
Mean daily minimum °F (°C)	6.5 (−14.2)	11.8 (−11.2)	20.6 (−6.3)	30.9 (−0.6)	42.4 (5.8)	52.2 (11.2)	58.1 (14.5)	55.6 (13.1)	44.5 (6.9)	32.0 (0.0)	18.7 (−7.4)	9.6 (−12.4)	31.9 (−0.1)
Record low °F (°C)	−34 (−37)	−35 (−37)	−26 (−32)	2 (−17)	19 (−7)	32 (0)	38 (3)	37 (3)	18 (−8)	6 (−14)	−20 (−29)	−35 (−37)	−35 (−37)
Average precipitation inches (mm)	0.41 (10)	0.64 (16)	1.33 (34)	1.90 (48)	3.58 (91)	3.72 (94)	3.23 (82)	3.06 (78)	1.75 (44)	1.36 (35)	1.03 (26)	0.53 (13)	22.54 (571)
Average snowfall inches (cm)	5.6 (14)	4.6 (12)	5.2 (13)	1.3 (3.3)	0.0 (0.0)	0.0 (0.0)	0.0 (0.0)	0.0 (0.0)	0.1 (0.25)	1.2 (3.0)	6.8 (17)	4.3 (11)	29.1 (73.55)
Average precipitation days (≥ 0.01 inch)	2.9	3.2	5.2	7.4	9.3	9.0	7.7	6.7	5.8	4.4	3.7	2.7	68
Average snowy days (≥ 0.1 inch)	2.3	2.0	2.1	1.0	0.0	0.0	0.0	0.0	0.1	0.5	1.7	1.8	11.5
Source: NOAA (normals, 1971–2000)

== Notable person ==
- Milly Bernard - Member of the Utah House of Representatives from 1966 to 1976.

== See also ==
- List of municipalities in Nebraska
