= Woody, Texas =

- Ghost town
- Location in Texas Location in the United States
- Coordinates: 31°45′09.7″N 103°29′35.7″W
- Country: United States
- State: Texas
- County: Loving
- Founded: 1910
- Elevation: 2,800 ft (850 m)

Population (2010)
  - Total: 0
- Time zone: UTC-6 (Central (CST))
  - Summer (DST): UTC-5 (CDT)

Woody is a ghost town in Loving County, Texas, United States.

== History ==
The village was founded in 1910, when a post office opened there, and closed in 1911. It was named "Woody" after the nickname of a local businessman, Fannin Woodyard Johnson.

== Geography ==
Woody lies on the Texas State Highway 302, 7 mi (11 km) east of Mentone, the county seat, and 24 mi (39 km) west of Kermit.

== See also ==
- List of ghost towns in Texas
