= Purdum =

Purdum is a surname. Notable people with the surname include:

- Tanner Purdum (born 1984), American football player
- Todd S. Purdum (born 1959), American journalist

== See also ==
- Purdum, Nebraska
