= Kristin Graziano =

First female sheriff of South Carolina

Kristin R. Graziano is the former Sheriff of Charleston County, South Carolina. She is the first female sheriff and the first openly gay sheriff to be elected in the state of South Carolina. She defeated her opponent, Al Cannon, in the November 2020 election. Graziano ran for reelection in 2024 and was defeated by Carl Ritchie.

== Career ==
=== Charleston County Sheriff ===
Graziano informally announced her desire to run for sheriff of Charleston, against the sheriff incumbent, Al Cannon, in February 2020. In response to the announcement, Cannon, in a criticized and controversial move, decided to place her on unpaid administrative until after the election was over. On November 4, 2020, it was announced Graziano won the election against Cannon, who'd served as the county's sheriff since 1988, with 52% of the votes. Graziano has said she plans to ban chokeholds and no-knock warrants, the latter being especially of public interest as just months before the election, the fatal shooting of Breonna Taylor occurred as the result of a no-knock warrant being executed.

== Personal life ==
Graziano is openly gay.
