= Edna Reed DeWees =

American sheriff (1921–2009)

- Born: Edna Reed; September 5, 1921; Gloster, Mississippi, U.S.
- Died: January 22, 2009; Del Rio, Texas, U.S.
- Other name: Edna Reed Clayton DeWees
- Occupation: Sheriff
- Known for: First woman elected sheriff in Texas
- Children: 5

Edna Reed DeWees (formerly Clayton; September 5, 1921 – January 22, 2009) was an American law enforcement officer. As the sheriff of Loving County, Texas, from 1945 to 1947, she was the first woman to be elected sheriff in the state of Texas.

== Life and career ==
Edna Reed was born to Harry and Esther Edith Reed on September 5, 1921, in Gloster, Mississippi. Her parents moved to Texas before she turned one year old, and she attended school in Breckenridge. After graduating from high school, DeWees worked as a deputy district clerk in Stephens County.

During World War II, she worked as a lathe operator at Vultee Aircraft in Fort Worth, and also worked at Pecos Army Airfield. DeWees began living in Loving County in the 1940s.

DeWees was appointed sheriff of Loving County, Texas, in 1945, at the age of 24. She was officially elected to the office in that same year. This made her the first woman to be elected sheriff in the state of Texas. Although DeWees was the first woman elected sheriff in Texas, she was only the second woman to serve as sheriff in the state; Emma Daugherty Banister had been appointed as sheriff in Coleman County in 1918, but was never elected to that position.

DeWees served as sheriff from 1945 (the year of her appointment and her election) to 1947, although the start and end dates of her term have also been given as 1946 and 1948 respectively. During her two years as sheriff, DeWees performed only two arrests. She also did not carry a firearm. At the time of her election, Loving County was notably sparsely populated, which contributed to its low crime rate. After she completed her term as sheriff, DeWees worked as county district clerk in Loving from 1965 to 1986.

DeWees was married twice, to George C. Clayton and to Lawrence DeWees, and she had five children. She retired to a ranch near Mentone and died at the age of 87 in 2009 from Alzheimer's disease.
