= Milly Bernard =

American politician (1920–2005)

Mildred Adelaide "Milly" Cox Bernard

Member of the Utah House of Representatives from the 24th district
- In office 1966–1976

Personal details
- Born: 28 May 1920 Brewster, Nebraska, U.S.
- Died: 7 November 2005 (aged 85) Kearns, Utah, U.S.
- Party: Democratic
- Spouse: Lynn (Bud) Bernard
- Education: University of Colorado
- Profession: Politician

Mildred Adelaide Cox Oberhansley Bernard (May 28, 1920 – November 7, 2005) was a member of the Utah House of Representatives from Kearns, Utah, serving five terms from 1966 to 1976.

== Early life and career ==
Bernard was born May 28, 1920, in Brewster, Nebraska, to Robert E. and Eleanor Jarvis Cox. She graduated with honors from Broken Bow High School in Broken Bow, Nebraska, after which she attended business college in Denver.

Two marriages, to Robert E. Workman and to Rex E. Oberhansley, ended in divorce. In 1972, she married Justice Court Judge Lynn (Bud) Bernard; the marriage lasted until his death in 1987.

== Political career ==
After moving to Kearns, where she was one of the earliest residents, she helped to organize the Kearns Town Council, on which she served for many years. She was a charter member of the Kearns Water & Sewer District Board, and the first woman to sit on the Salt Lake Planning and Zoning Commission, a seat that she held for 13 years.

In 1967, she was elected to the Utah House of Representatives as Milly Oberhansley. She served five terms, until 1976, changing her name to Milly O. Bernard in 1972. A Democrat, she served as Majority Whip, and as Minority and Majority Leader. She also sat on a number of boards and committees, including the Juvenile Court Governing Board, the Judicial Council, the Granite Mental Health Board, the Community Action Board, and the Social Services Committee.

Bernard described herself as a "minority, minority, minority", as a woman, a non-Mormon, and as a non-native of Utah. Colleagues described her as a supporter of higher education and of women's rights.

In 1976, Bernard was appointed by Governor Cal Rampton and reappointed by Governor Scott M. Matheson to the Utah Public Service Commission, on which she served as chairman until her retirement in 1982.

Bernard worked for fifteen years for EIMCO, a Salt Lake supplier of mining machinery; her tenure at EIMCO encompassed her ten years in the House.

Bernard died in Keans at the age of 85.
