= Red Bluff Reservoir =

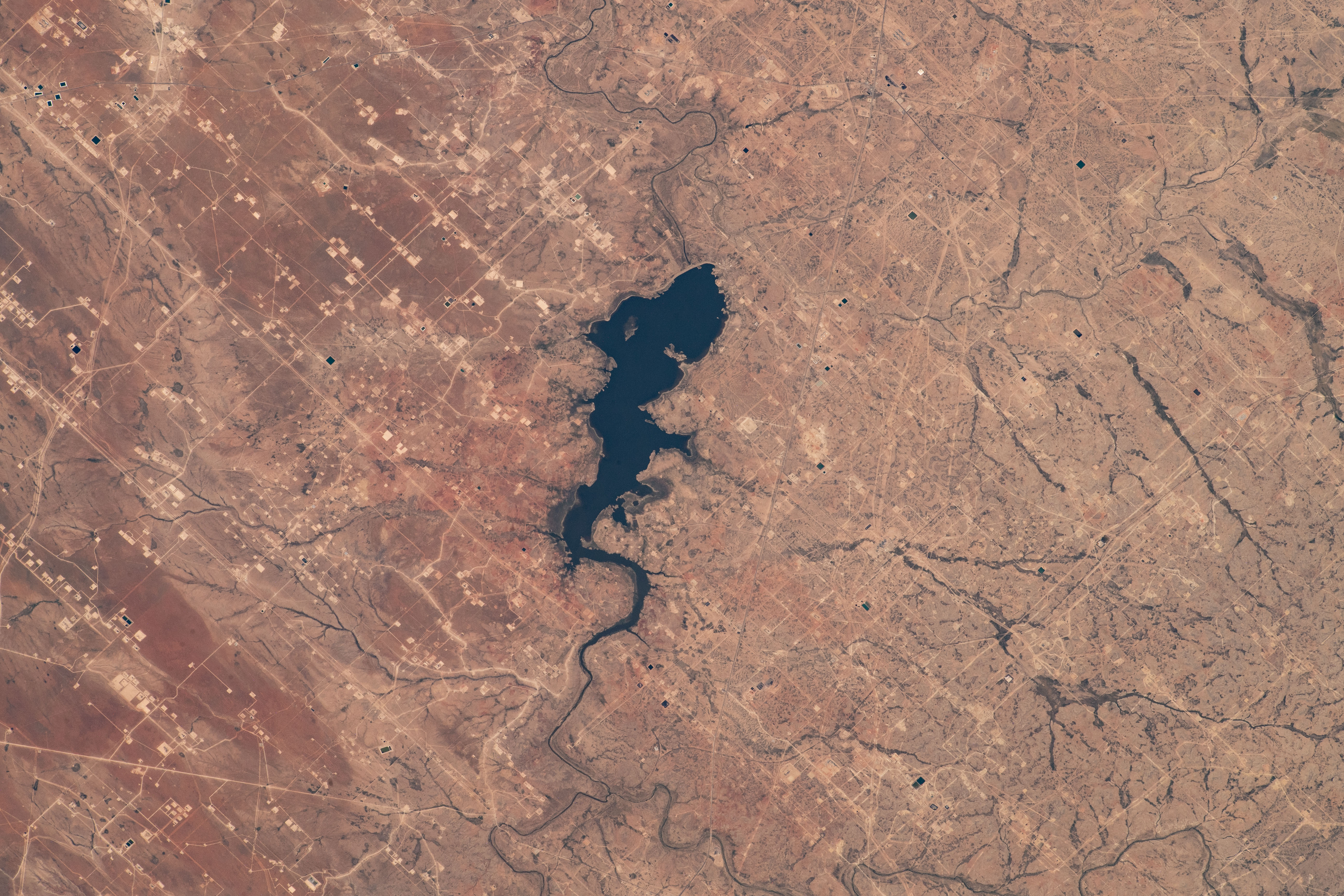
- Taken on June 30, 2022 from the International Space Station; north is oriented down.

- Location within New Mexico Location within Texas Location within the United States
- Location: Loving / Reeves counties in Texas and Eddy County in New Mexico, United States
- Coordinates: 31°56.87′N 103°55.88′W
- Type: Hydroelectric reservoir
- Primary inflows: Pecos River
- Primary outflows: Pecos River
- Basin countries: United States
- Surface area: 11,193 acres (4,530 ha)
- Max. depth: 77 ft (23 m)
- Water volume: 307,000 acre⋅ft (0.379 km^{3})
- Surface elevation: 2,826 ft (861 m)

Red Bluff Reservoir is a reservoir on the Pecos River 40 miles (64 km) north of Pecos, Texas. The reservoir extends into Loving and Reeves Counties in Texas, and Eddy County in New Mexico. The northern shoreline of the reservoir is the lowest point in the state of New Mexico. The reservoir was formed in 1936 by the construction of a dam by the Red Bluff Water Control District to provide water for irrigation and hydroelectric power. The reservoir is also used for recreational activities. With an elevation of 2,842 feet [866 m] above sea level, it is the lowest point in New Mexico.

== Fish and plant life ==
Red Bluff Reservoir has been stocked with species of fish intended to improve the utility of the reservoir for recreational fishing and swimming. Fish present in Red Bluff Reservoir include white bass and hybrid striped bass. Vegetation in the lake includes sago pondweed.

== Recreational uses ==
Fishing is a popular recreational use of the lake.
