= Porterville, Texas =

- Ghost town
- Location in Texas Location in the United States
- Coordinates: 31°41′12.9″N 103°37′05.2″W
- Country: United States
- State: Texas
- County: Loving

Population (2010)
  - Total: 0
- Time zone: UTC-6 (Central (CST))
  - Summer (DST): UTC-5 (CDT)
- ZIP codes: ?
- Area code: ?
- GNIS feature ID: 2033952

Porterville is a ghost town in Loving County, Texas, United States.

== History ==
Porterville was established in 1905 by Dr. Phil Porter, a physician who relocated from Michigan due to what he believed were health benefits of living in the desert. At one point in time, the town was a bustling community, with a hotel, a blacksmith's shop, a post office, a doctor, and two general stores. Its population growth was initially fueled by inexpensive farmland and irrigation. However, the nearby Pecos River was not big enough to accommodate the needs of the farmers, and the population of the town declined precipitously. When oil was discovered in the early 1930s, the nearby town of Mentone was established, and the population of Porterville declined gradually until the town became abandoned.

Today, little remains of the former Porterville. The only building that still survives in any usable fashion is the town's church, which was built in 1909 and moved to Mentone in 1931. The community's elevation and geographic coordinates are unknown, as the town today is essentially a bare strip of local highway.

== See also ==
- List of ghost towns in Texas
