= Clara Senecal =

First female sheriff in New York (1865–1944)

Clara Cagle Senecal
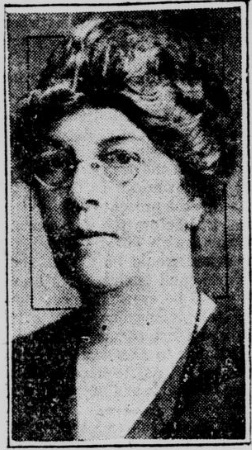
- Photograph of Senecal widely published upon her appointment as Sheriff in 1926

Sheriff of Clinton County, New York
- In office April 10, 1926 – January 1, 1927
- Preceded by: Eli Senecal (husband)

Personal details
- Born: July 15, 1865 Saranac Lake, New York
- Died: November 29, 1944 (aged 79) Plattsburgh, New York
- Occupation: Jail matron, sheriff

Clara Cagle Senecal (July 15, 1865-November 29, 1944) was the first woman to hold the office of sheriff in the State of New York. She was appointed to the position of sheriff for Clinton County by Governor Al Smith on April 10, 1926, filling the vacancy caused by the death of her husband Eli by a stroke. Her husband asked the governor that she appointed as his replacement shortly before his death. She had served as matron of the county jail during her husband's term. She served in the position until January 1, 1927, following an election for a replacement sheriff in November 1926. Eli Senecal had been elected sheriff of Clinton County in November 1925, as a Democrat in a Republican county, after serving 11 years as the Chief of Police of Plattsburgh, and a total of 35 years on the police force.

Senecal was born in Saranac Lake, New York on July 15, 1865. Senecal married Eli in January 1895. She had a son, Orrin. She died in Plattsburgh, where she had been living for 52 years, on November 29, 1944, at age 79. She is buried at Saint Peter's Cemetery in Plattsburgh.

Being appointed sheriff to replace a deceased husband happened several times in the United States in the early part of the 20th century.

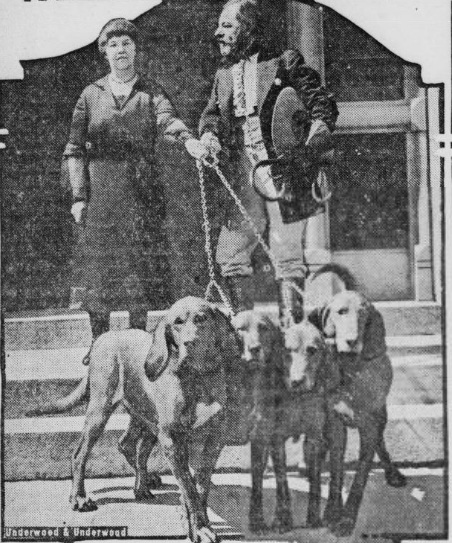
Senecal with four bloodhounds given to her by a movie company in 1926.

== See also ==
- List of first female sheriffs in the United States
