= Purdum, Nebraska =

Unincorporated community in Blaine County, Nebraska, United States

- Unincorporated community
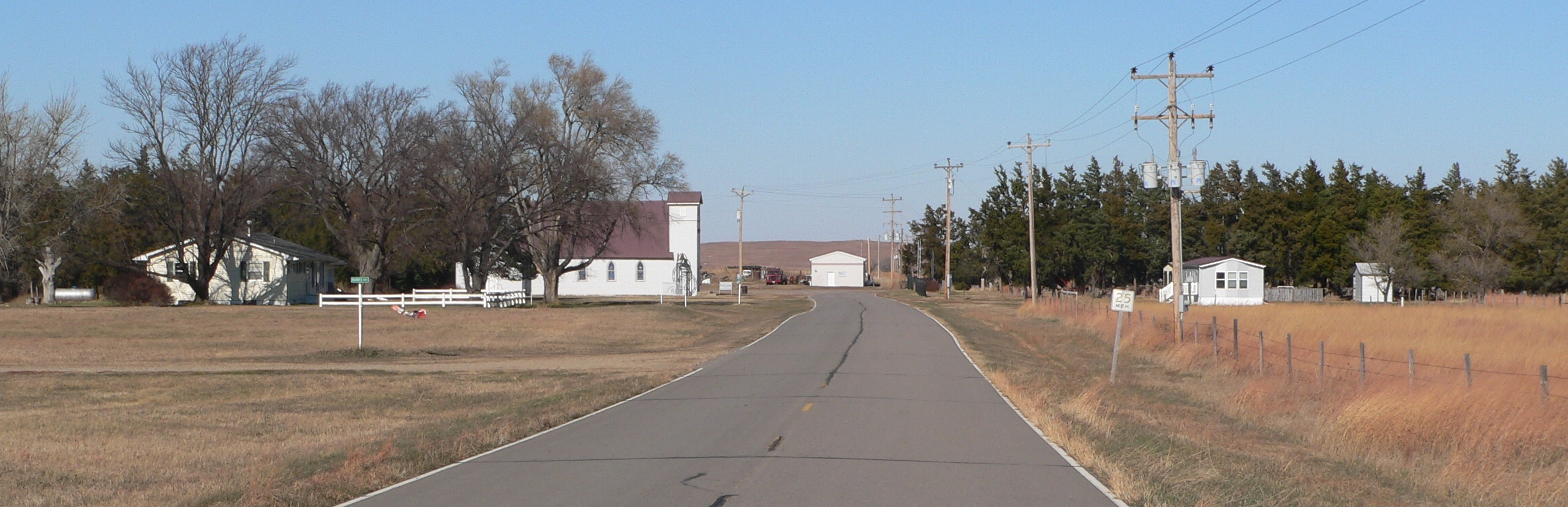
- Purdum, seen from the south

- Location within the state of Nebraska
- Coordinates: 42°3′54″N 100°15′30″W
- Country: United States
- State: Nebraska
- County: Blaine

Area
  - Total: 27.161 sq mi (70.35 km^{2})
  - Land: 26.969 sq mi (69.85 km^{2})
  - Water: 0.192 sq mi (0.50 km^{2})
- Elevation: 2,494 ft (760 m)

Population (2010)
  - Total: 21
  - Density: 0.78/sq mi (0.30/km^{2})
- Time zone: UTC-6 (Central (CST))
  - Summer (DST): UTC-5 (CDT)
- ZIP codes: 69157
- Area code: 308
- GNIS feature ID: 832414

Purdum is an unincorporated community in northwestern Blaine County, Nebraska, United States. It lies along local roads northwest of the village of Brewster, the county seat of Blaine County. Its elevation is 2,700 feet (823 m). Although Purdum is unincorporated, it has a post office, with the ZIP code of 69157. The town is also home to the Purdum State Bank, and a half-dozen small businesses, a church, and a fire station. In the immediate environs are several livestock ranches.

== History ==
Purdum was named for John Purdum, a pioneer settler.
