= Loving County Courthouse =

- U.S. National Register of Historic Places
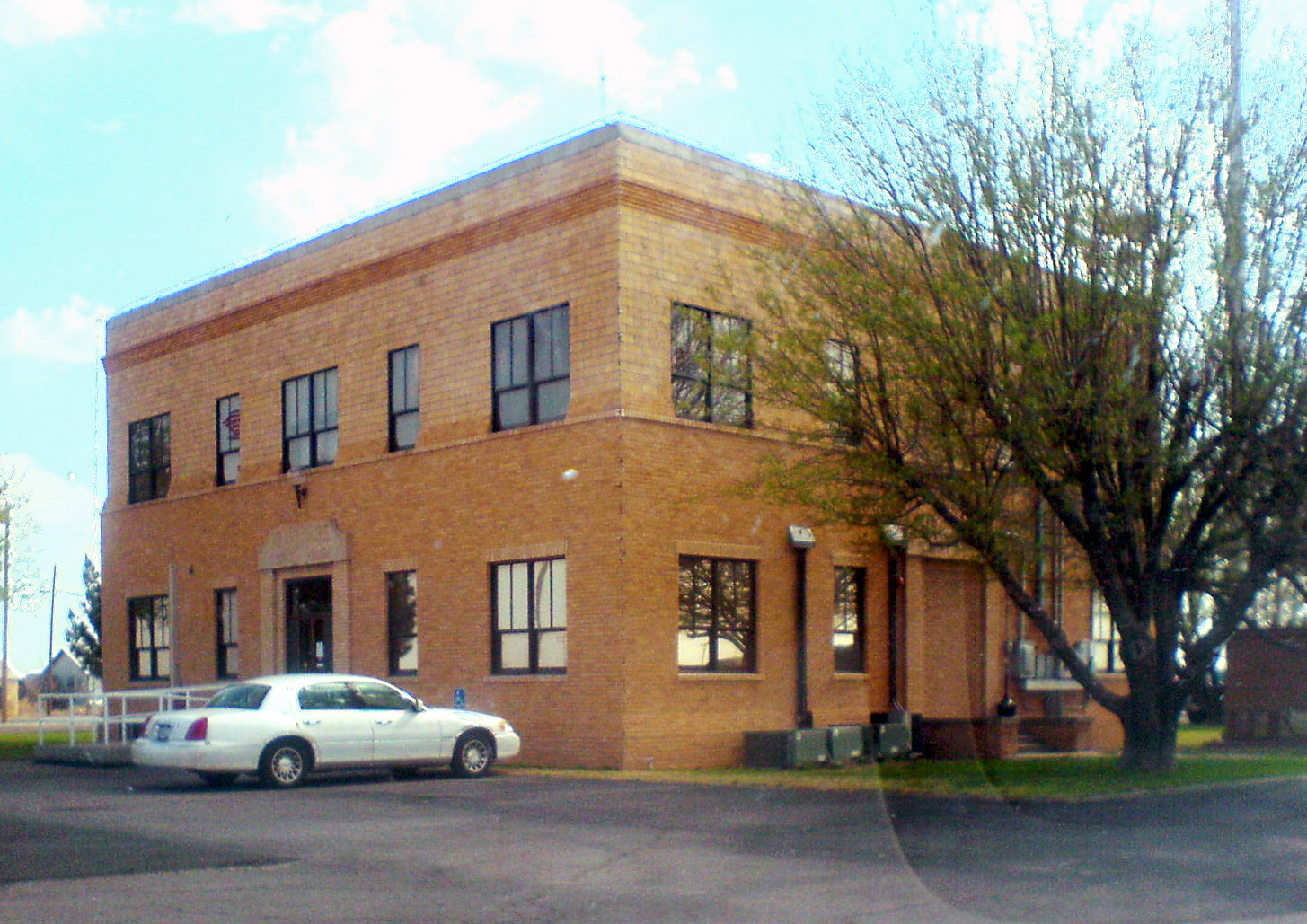
- The courthouse, as seen from the northeast

- Location within Texas Location within the United States
- Interactive map showing the location of Loving County Courthouse
- Location: Bounded by Pecos St., Collins St., Dallas St., and TX 302, Mentone, Texas
- Coordinates: 31°42′30″N 103°35′56″W
- Area: less than one acre
- Built: 1935
- Architect: Evan J. Wood
- Architectural style: Moderne
- NRHP reference No.: 06000362
- Added to NRHP: May 10, 2006

The Loving County Courthouse is a historic courthouse in Mentone, Texas. The courthouse, the first permanent one in the county, was built in 1935, replacing a temporary courthouse built in 1931. Loving County was organized in 1931 following an oil boom in the area; it reached a peak population of 600 shortly thereafter in 1933, though its population has since fallen to 64. Architect Evan J. Wood designed the building in the Moderne style; he was paid $2684.60 for his efforts. The two-story courthouse is the tallest building in Loving County and the only symbol of county government in the county.

== History ==
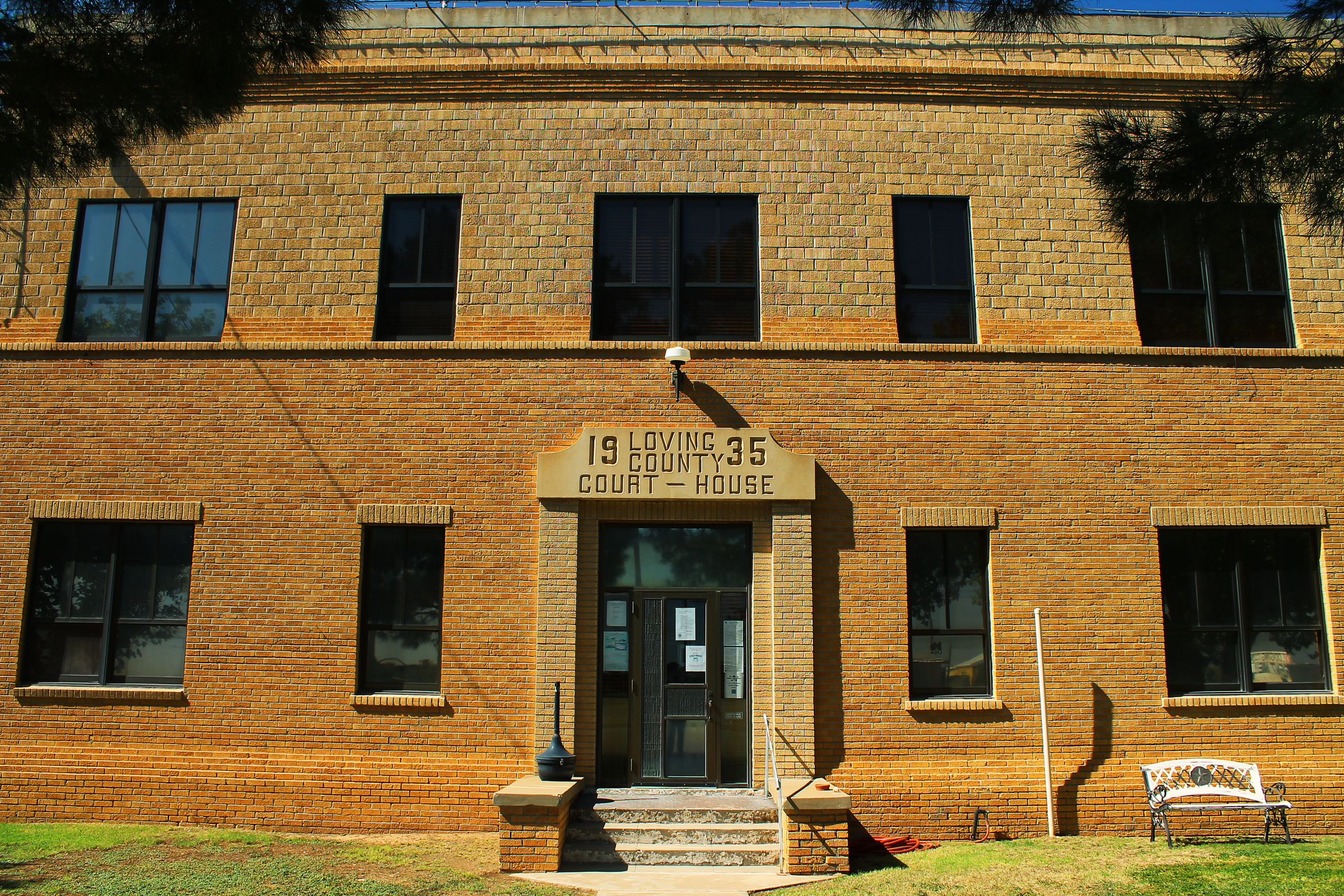
View of facade and entrance

As Loving County is the least populous county in the United States, few court proceedings have taken place at the courthouse. Only 726 civil cases were filed at the courthouse between 1931 and 2004, most of them involving car accidents or business disputes among the county's oil and gas producers. The county convicted its first felon in 1936, when it sentenced oilman Norman C. Hill to four years in prison for stealing $4,000 worth of piping. Two jury trials in 2003 were the first in the county since its district court was established in 1955; the county's entire adult population was called for the 60-person jury panel, and establishing a jury was nearly impossible due to a Texas law prohibiting relatives from serving on the same jury, as only two potential jurors were unrelated to another potential juror. Nonetheless, the courthouse plays an important role in Loving County, as nearly a third of its population is employed by the county government.

The courthouse was added to the National Register of Historic Places on May 10, 2006.

As of summer 2011, a new courthouse annex was nearing completion across Collins Street to the northwest. It is expected to house the offices of the sheriff and the county clerk. The new single-story building of Southwestern style architecture will roughly equal the main courthouse in area of floor space.

== See also ==
- National Register of Historic Places listings in Loving County, Texas
- List of county courthouses in Texas
