= Blaine County, Nebraska =

County in Nebraska, United States

- County
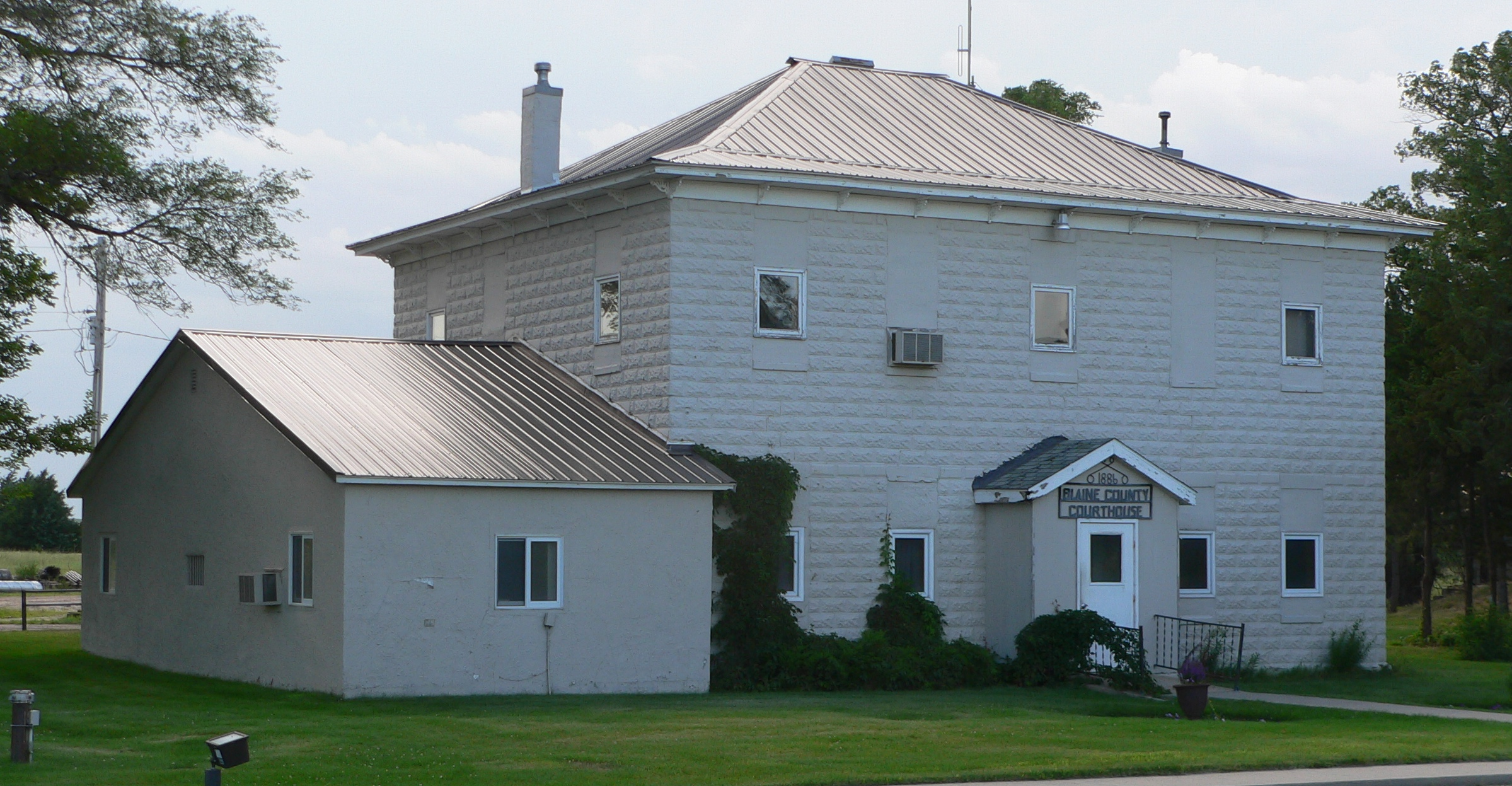
- The Blaine County Courthouse in Brewster

- Location within the U.S. state of Nebraska
- Coordinates: 41.931945°N 99.996407°W
- Country: United States
- State: Nebraska
- Created: March 5, 1885
- Organized: 1886
- Named for: James G. Blaine
- Seat: Brewster
- Largest village: Dunning

Area
  - Total: 714.337 sq mi (1,850.12 km^{2})
  - Land: 710.702 sq mi (1,840.71 km^{2})
  - Water: 3.635 sq mi (9.41 km^{2}) 0.51%

Population (2020)
  - Total: 431
  - Estimate (2025): 458 ▲
  - Density: 0.606/sq mi (0.234/km^{2})
- Time zone: UTC−6 (Central)
  - Summer (DST): UTC−5 (CDT)
- Area code: 308
- Congressional district: 3rd
- Website: blainecounty.nebraska.gov
- • Nebraska county number 05 • Nebraska license plate prefix 86

Blaine County is a county in the U.S. state of Nebraska. As of the 2020 census, the population was 431, and was estimated to be 458 in 2025, making it the third-least populous county in Nebraska and the seventh-least populous in the United States. The county seat is Brewster and the largest village is Dunning.

In the Nebraska license plate system, Blaine County was represented by the prefix "86" (as it had the 86th-largest number of vehicles registered in the state when the license plate system was established in 1922).

== History ==
Blaine County was created on March 5, 1885 and organized in 1886. It is named after presidential candidate James G. Blaine.

Blaine County, named after James G. Blaine, a prominent American politician, was established on March 23, 1885. The settlement of Blaine County, like the rest of the Sandhills region, began later than many other Nebraska counties due to its less accessible and perceived less fertile location than other parts of Nebraska. Not until the passage of the Kinkaid Act in 1904, which allowed homesteaders to claim 640 acres instead of the usual 160 under the Homestead Act, did significant settlement in the county occur.

The first settlements in Blaine County were primarily for ranching rather than farming. The town of Brewster, established in 1884, became the county seat. Ranching, particularly cattle, became the economic mainstay, as the sandy soil was better suited for grazing than for crop cultivation. The settlers adapted to the environment by focusing on livestock, with cattle drives and the eventual development of cattle breeding being central to the county's economy.

== Geography ==
According to the United States Census Bureau, the county has a total area of 714.337 square miles (1,850.12 km^{2}), of which 710.702 square miles (1,840.71 km^{2}) is land and 3.635 square miles (9.41 km^{2}) (0.51%) is water. It is the 39th-largest county in Nebraska by total area.

=== Major highways ===
- Nebraska Highway 2
- Nebraska Highway 7
- Nebraska Highway 91

=== Adjacent counties ===
- Loup County – east
- Custer County – south
- Logan County – southwest
- Thomas County – west
- Cherry County – northwest
- Brown County – north

=== National protected area ===
- Nebraska National Forest (part)

== Demographics ==
Historical population
| Census | Pop. | Note | %± |
|---|---|---|---|
| 1890 | 1,146 | | — |
| 1900 | 603 | | −47.4% |
| 1910 | 1,672 | | 177.3% |
| 1920 | 1,778 | | 6.3% |
| 1930 | 1,584 | | −10.9% |
| 1940 | 1,538 | | −2.9% |
| 1950 | 1,203 | | −21.8% |
| 1960 | 1,016 | | −15.5% |
| 1970 | 847 | | −16.6% |
| 1980 | 867 | | 2.4% |
| 1990 | 675 | | −22.1% |
| 2000 | 583 | | −13.6% |
| 2010 | 478 | | −18.0% |
| 2020 | 431 | | −9.8% |
| 2025 (est.) | 458 | ▲ | 6.3% |
U.S. Decennial Census; 1790–1960 1900–1990; 1990–2000 2010–2020

=== 2020 census ===
As of the 2020 census, the county had a population of 431. The median age was 49.2 years. 20.4% of residents were under the age of 18 and 24.6% of residents were 65 years of age or older. For every 100 females there were 112.3 males, and for every 100 females age 18 and over there were 110.4 males age 18 and over.

The racial makeup of the county was 92.1% White, 0.2% Black or African American, 0.0% American Indian and Alaska Native, 0.7% Asian, 0.0% Native Hawaiian and Pacific Islander, 1.4% from some other race, and 5.6% from two or more races. Hispanic or Latino residents of any race comprised 2.6% of the population.

0.0% of residents lived in urban areas, while 100.0% lived in rural areas.

There were 199 households in the county, of which 24.1% had children under the age of 18 living with them and 19.1% had a female householder with no spouse or partner present. About 30.7% of all households were made up of individuals and 15.0% had someone living alone who was 65 years of age or older.

There were 299 housing units, of which 33.4% were vacant. Among occupied housing units, 65.8% were owner-occupied and 34.2% were renter-occupied. The homeowner vacancy rate was 2.2% and the rental vacancy rate was 4.1%.

=== 2000 census ===
As of the 2000 census, there were 583 people, 238 households, and 168 families residing in the county. The population density was 0.82 inhabitants per square mile (0.3/km^{2}). There were 333 housing units at an average density of 0.47 per square mile (0.2/km^{2}). The racial makeup of the county was 98.97% White, 0.51% African American, 0.00% Native American, 0.20% Asian, 0.00% Pacific Islander, 0.00% from some other races and 0.51% from two or more races. Hispanic or Latino people of any race were 0.17% of the population. 45.1% were of German, 12.2% English, 10.2% Irish and 8.4% American ancestry.

There were 238 households, of which 30.30% had children under the age of 18 living with them, 66.00% were married couples living together, 2.50% had a female householder with no husband present, and 29.00% were non-families. 26.90% of all households were made up of individuals, and 13.90% had someone living alone who was 65 years of age or older. The average household size was 2.45 and the average family size was 2.98.

The county population contained 26.20% under the age of 18, 3.90% from 18 to 24, 26.60% from 25 to 44, 26.40% from 45 to 64, and 16.80% who were 65 years of age or older. The median age was 40 years. For every 100 females there were 101.70 males. For every 100 females age 18 and over, there were 100.90 males.

The median income for a household in the county was $25,278, and the median income for a family was $28,472. Males had a median income of $17,917 versus $20,000 for females. The per capita income for the county was $12,323. About 18.70% of families and 19.40% of the population were below the poverty line, including 21.70% of those under age 18 and 9.40% of those age 65 or over.

== Communities ==
=== Villages ===
- Brewster (county seat)
- Dunning
- Halsey (partial)

=== Unincorporated communities ===
- Purdum
- Linscott

== Politics ==
Blaine County voters are strongly Republican. In only four national elections since 1900 has the county selected the Democratic Party candidate, and none since 1936.

| Political Party | Number of registered voters (March 1, 2026) | Percent |
|---|---|---|
| Republican | 299 | 84.46% |
| Independent | 30 | 8.47% |
| Democratic | 21 | 5.93% |
| Libertarian | 4 | 1.13% |
| Legal Marijuana Now | 0 | 0.00% |
| Total | 354 | 100.00% |

United States presidential election results for Blaine County, Nebraska
| Year | Republican | | Democratic | | Third party(ies) | |
| Year | No. | % | No. | % | No. | % |
|---|---|---|---|---|---|---|
| 1900 | 103 | 57.54% | 75 | 41.90% | 1 | 0.56% |
| 1904 | 127 | 70.17% | 34 | 18.78% | 20 | 11.05% |
| 1908 | 220 | 56.12% | 160 | 40.82% | 12 | 3.06% |
| 1912 | 126 | 29.03% | 163 | 37.56% | 145 | 33.41% |
| 1916 | 184 | 40.71% | 246 | 54.42% | 22 | 4.87% |
| 1920 | 328 | 63.81% | 176 | 34.24% | 10 | 1.95% |
| 1924 | 253 | 43.40% | 132 | 22.64% | 198 | 33.96% |
| 1928 | 484 | 73.11% | 175 | 26.44% | 3 | 0.45% |
| 1932 | 244 | 35.41% | 431 | 62.55% | 14 | 2.03% |
| 1936 | 342 | 47.77% | 365 | 50.98% | 9 | 1.26% |
| 1940 | 454 | 59.35% | 311 | 40.65% | 0 | 0.00% |
| 1944 | 366 | 59.61% | 248 | 40.39% | 0 | 0.00% |
| 1948 | 252 | 50.40% | 248 | 49.60% | 0 | 0.00% |
| 1952 | 458 | 76.97% | 137 | 23.03% | 0 | 0.00% |
| 1956 | 416 | 73.63% | 149 | 26.37% | 0 | 0.00% |
| 1960 | 420 | 78.80% | 113 | 21.20% | 0 | 0.00% |
| 1964 | 326 | 62.57% | 195 | 37.43% | 0 | 0.00% |
| 1968 | 344 | 79.45% | 64 | 14.78% | 25 | 5.77% |
| 1972 | 343 | 85.96% | 56 | 14.04% | 0 | 0.00% |
| 1976 | 281 | 66.59% | 133 | 31.52% | 8 | 1.90% |
| 1980 | 361 | 81.67% | 63 | 14.25% | 18 | 4.07% |
| 1984 | 363 | 88.32% | 48 | 11.68% | 0 | 0.00% |
| 1988 | 338 | 82.24% | 72 | 17.52% | 1 | 0.24% |
| 1992 | 256 | 56.51% | 64 | 14.13% | 133 | 29.36% |
| 1996 | 284 | 75.13% | 53 | 14.02% | 41 | 10.85% |
| 2000 | 299 | 85.67% | 43 | 12.32% | 7 | 2.01% |
| 2004 | 301 | 88.79% | 38 | 11.21% | 0 | 0.00% |
| 2008 | 266 | 84.18% | 43 | 13.61% | 7 | 2.22% |
| 2012 | 268 | 88.45% | 29 | 9.57% | 6 | 1.98% |
| 2016 | 276 | 87.07% | 30 | 9.46% | 11 | 3.47% |
| 2020 | 280 | 88.33% | 35 | 11.04% | 2 | 0.63% |
| 2024 | 250 | 85.62% | 37 | 12.67% | 5 | 1.71% |
