= Al Cannon =

American attorney, sheriff of Charleston County

Sheriff of Charleston County
- In office February 25, 1988 – January 4, 2021
- Preceded by: Chuck Dawley
- Succeeded by: Kristin Graziano

Personal details
- Born: James Alton Cannon Jr. October 9, 1946 (age 79) Charleston, South Carolina, U.S.
- Party: Republican
- Spouse: Wallis Baldwin Cannon (m. 1971)
- Children: 2

Military service
- Allegiance: United States
- Branch/service: United States Air Force and Air Force Reserve
- Years of service: 1967-1971 (active duty); 1978-2006 (Reserve)
- Rank: Colonel (Reserve)
- Unit: Office of Special Investigations

James Alton "Al" Cannon Jr. (born October 9, 1946) is an American law enforcement officer, attorney and politician. He served as sheriff of Charleston County, South Carolina, from February 1988 until January 2021. He was defeated by Democratic challenger Kristin Graziano in the November 2020 election.

== Early life ==
Cannon was born October 9, 1946, in Charleston, South Carolina, to Margie Elizabeth Fuller Cannon (1921 – 2007) and James Alton Cannon, Sr. (1922 – 2001), a World War II veteran. His parents owned and operated a grocery store in North Charleston before his mother went on to become a judicial clerk and later the first female judge in Charleston County.

Cannon was raised in North Charleston, where he attended Chicora High School and played on the varsity basketball team. He was known for his hook shot. After graduation in 1964, Cannon entered a pre-law program at the University of South Carolina, where he studied until dropping out to join the U.S. Air Force in 1967.

=== Military service ===
In the military, he studied Russian at Syracuse University and became a Russian translator for the Air Force Security Service stationed at Tempelhof Air Base, West Berlin, during the Cold War. He served in that role for the last 30 months of his active-duty deployment, which ended in 1971.

In 1978, Cannon joined the Air Force Reserve and was commissioned as a second lieutenant. In his career as a reservist, Cannon worked as a special agent with the Air Force Office of Special Investigations. He directed felony criminal investigations and participated in counterintelligence and anti-terrorism operations. He was deployed in various countries, including Egypt, Peru, Bangladesh and Japan. Active-duty deployments came for months at a time during his tenure as sheriff in 1992, 1995, 1996 and 1999, when he served for 60 days as deputy commander of the U.S. military's joint counterintelligence office in support of American air war efforts in Kosovo. Meanwhile, his assistant sheriff, Kathy Hare, took the reins of the agency. Through these experiences, Cannon became known as an expert on counterterrorism and counterintelligence.

Cannon retired from the Air Force Reserve in October 2006 as a colonel, a capacity in which he served as reserve commander of the 3rd Field Investigations Region at Scott Air Force Base in Illinois, where he led investigative, counterintelligence and counterterrorism support to fifteen Air Mobility Command bases nationwide.

== Early law enforcement career ==
After leaving the active-duty Air Force, Cannon enrolled in a bachelor's degree program at the College of Charleston. In the six months he waited before starting class, he signed up in 1971 to be a patrol officer for the Charleston County Police Department.

After graduating from the College of Charleston in 1973, Cannon was hired at the North Charleston Police Department shortly after the founding of that agency and the city in 1972. As a patrolman in 1974, he was appointed by the North Charleston police chief to form a police-community relations program. As a corporal in 1974, he was named the department's public information officer.

About three years after his hiring, Cannon was promoted to lieutenant in North Charleston. In 1977, while on the police force, he earned a master's degree in criminal justice, then resigned from the department to attend law school. Cannon earned a Juris Doctor from the University of South Carolina School of Law in December 1981 and was admitted to the South Carolina bar the next year.

He tried becoming a prosecutor as a deputy county attorney for Charleston County, before being appointed in March 1984 as North Charleston police chief. In August 1987, North Charleston Mayor John Bourne fired Cannon for failing to enforce a city ordinance requiring police officers to be residents of the city.

In 1987, Cannon served for a brief time as a captain at the Charleston Police Department before taking a leave of absence to run for sheriff after Sheriff Charles F. "Chuck" Dawley, 54, died on October 23, 1987, of a heart attack while on a trip in Florida.

== Tenure as sheriff ==
Cannon was first elected sheriff on February 23, 1988, in a special election to complete the rest of Dawley's term. Cannon ran as a Democrat, beating interim Sheriff Michael O'Dowd, a Republican. He won that special election with 20,035 votes to O'Dowd's 6,726. In November 1988, he ran unopposed and won his first full term in office. Among the efforts he told prospective voters he would focus on were jail overcrowding, an outdated computer system and a communications system that didn't permit separate police agencies to communicate with each other.

In his first six years in office, Cannon became an independent, then a Republican in 1994. He has remained a Republican in his career since then. Cannon has run unopposed in eight general elections, winning reelection each time.

His most significant electoral challenge came in the 1996 Republican primary when retired FBI Agent Bill Nettles, retired sheriff's Captain Paul Hawkins and former Folly Beach Police Chief Steve Shephard ran against him. In the primary, Cannon got 49.6 percent of the vote, 80 votes short of the majority share needed for outright re-election. Nettles had 32.7 percent, Hawkins 12.1 percent and Shephard 5.6 percent. The results forced a runoff in which Cannon took 58.5 percent of the vote. Nettles had argued that he would be a sheriff who would get along with city police chiefs, citing Cannon's disagreements with Charleston Police Chief Reuben Greenberg, who at times had objected to Cannon's deputies enforcing state laws within Charleston city limits, where the agencies technically share jurisdiction. Cannon argued he was not to blame for the dispute and had made numerous services available to the Charleston police.

=== County law enforcement merger ===
Following through on early campaign promises to consolidate law enforcement functions in Charleston County, Cannon successfully pushed for the merger of the Charleston County Police Department and the Charleston County Sheriff's Office.

In 1937, the South Carolina General Assembly had put control of the police force into the hands of the Charleston County Council instead of the sheriff. The Charleston County Police Department handled primary law enforcement duties throughout the county while the sheriff oversaw the jail, courthouse security and delinquent tax collection. But the county police over its 67-year history was beleaguered by in-fighting, high turnover of personnel and chiefs, and corruption that saw two of the chiefs get convicted of crimes. One of the chiefs had allowed the distribution of untaxed whiskey from police headquarters, and the other was imprisoned for extortion and racketeering. At least 15 officers had also been convicted of crimes.

Cannon started pushing for the two agencies to be consolidated shortly after his election. When County Police Chief William Sidoran resigned in March 1990, Cannon campaigned for the move until voters in November 1990 approved it by a slim margin. The Charleston County Council also approved it in a vote, and on January 1, 1991, Cannon took control of the 300-employee county police force. Critics said Cannon had pushed for the consolidation to increase his power base in a bid for higher office.

=== Countywide police consolidation ===
After successfully merging the county Police Department and the Sheriff's Office in the early 1990s, Cannon has at times pushed for the consolidation of all city and county law enforcement agencies in Charleston County. The possibility emerged in 2006 as parts of the Charleston suburb James Island attempted to incorporate into its own town that needed its own police services. Town leaders had no plans to start their own police department and instead called on the Charleston County Sheriff's Office to provide law enforcement.

While county government leaders pushed for the county to charge the new town for the service, Cannon argued that county law enforcement protection should be free to all who pay county taxes. But he also pushed for a referendum on whether all police services in the county should be consolidated. A similar vote that asked residents to approve the consolidation of all governments in Charleston County had failed in the 1970s. After the town of James Island successfully incorporated in 2012 after years of legal challenges from the neighboring city of Charleston, the town started paying off-duty deputies to patrol the town.

=== Jail overpopulation ===
A 2003 report by the National Institute of Corrections faulted Charleston County for an inefficient criminal justice system that carried higher incarceration rates than other counties in South Carolina. Charleston County, which includes numerous law enforcement agencies, had 4.6 inmates per 1,000 residents compared with 2.7 in Greenville County, 2.5 in Richland County and 1.4 in Horry County in the years studied (2000 and 2001).

Funded by a grant from the John D. and Catherine T. MacArthur Foundation, the Charleston County Criminal Justice Coordinating Council formed in 2015 and included more than a dozen agencies. It included a "cite and release" approach for low-level, nonviolent offenses such as shoplifting. Cannon said in a 2016 editorial in The Washington Post that some people wind up in jail despite not needing to be there in the first place. These included minor offenders, homeless people, the mentally ill and drug addicts.

=== Jail expansion ===
Throughout his tenure as sheriff, Cannon has pushed for the expansion of the Charleston County jail that he oversees. The facility had suffered overcrowding in the early 2000s, with the capacity in 2003 pegged at 660 inmates but the population topping 2,000.

$100 million in funding for a large 2010 addition was secured after Cannon pleaded with the county's governing council. After the expansion, the jail had 21 dormitory units and could hold more than 2,100 inmates.

In November 2010, the jail was named the Sheriff Al Cannon Detention Center.

=== Counterintelligence and security ===
Cannon has remained active in counterintelligence and cyber security efforts locally and nationally, frequently being named to advisory boards and as a speaker at events. That involvement has included multiple trips to Israel, including one in 2004 sponsored by the National Sheriffs' Association, to learn about efforts by law enforcement to deal with terrorism threats.

After a series of crashes involving tractor-trailer trucks in Charleston County, Cannon stepped up enforcement of traffic law violations by commercial vehicles, hoping to stem major incidents exacerbated by the hazardous cargo that the trucks could be carrying. He said at the time that this enforcement was also necessary to potentially stop terrorist threats.

He said the November 2015 terrorist attacks in Paris were a sign of the type of threats to come in the U.S. and called on local law enforcement to step up their game in localized counterintelligence efforts. As Republican leaders in South Carolina argued against admitting Syrian refugees from the Islamic State of Iraq and the Levant in 2015, Cannon said immigration also posed a challenge because of the difficulty of vetting people seeking to enter the country.

=== Opposition to gun control ===
Cannon has opposed proposals for increased gun control measures in the wake of mass shootings, including the killings at Sandy Hook Elementary School in Newtown, Connecticut, in 2012. and an Aurora movie theater in 2012. Cannon contended that "Gun control doesn't work as a crime control method" and criticized the Rev. Jesse Jackson for his support for an assault weapons ban.

In January 2013, after President Barack Obama proposed measures including universal background checks and bans on high-capacity ammunition magazines following a mass shooting at Sandy Hook, Cannon announced to local press that he would refuse any new restrictions on firearms that he deemed to violate the Second Amendment. Cannon compared Obama's proposal to Nazism. Cannon's remarks promoted calls for his resignation.

=== Conditions of Juvenile Center ===
Officials with the Charleston County Sheriff’s Office, in charge of Charleston County’s juvenile lockup are being sued in federal court by an advocacy group after years of complaints that conditions endanger and traumatize children held there. Since the lawsuit, the children have been moved to the adult detention center.

The Department of Justice filed a statement with the court stating conditions similar to those alleged in the lawsuit have been found unconstitutional by other courts. The statement says the federal government has investigated, and worked to remedy, other isolation practices much like those mentioned in the lawsuit.

=== Assault and battery charge ===
On January 30, 2012, Cannon attempted to conduct a traffic stop on Timothy Shawn McManus' pickup truck after it nearly struck his SUV on Mount Pleasant's Hungryneck Boulevard. McManus led Cannon and several deputies on a 25-mile chase that hit 120 mph and wound through suburban and rural areas. On a dirt road in the Francis Marion National Forest, Cannon fired nine shots from a .45-caliber pistol at the tires of McManus' truck. At least two other deputies later shot at the truck until one of its tires shredded, sending the car to the roadside.

Dashboard camera footage showed McManus being pulled from his truck, punched at least six times, and detained by four officers. The officers allowed a police dog to bite McManus' right arm for more than 20 seconds.

While McManus was handcuffed in the back of a law enforcement car, Cannon confronted him, said "What the (expletive) is wrong with you?" and then slapped McManus and slammed the door.

The next day, Cannon admitted to slapping the handcuffed suspect and issued a public apology. McManus filed a lawsuit stating that Cannon had "busted him in the nose" and that he needed “17 staples to his upper right arm where the dog chewed at and ripped apart his flesh” and sought $600,000 in damages. The lawsuit was dismissed in March 2015 after McManus failed to attend a court date.

The South Carolina Law Enforcement Division arrested Cannon on August 28, 2012, on a misdemeanor charge of third-degree assault and battery. He was later cleared of civil rights violations, and the misdemeanor charge was dismissed after Cannon completed a pre-trial intervention program. Cannon's criminal record was erased after he did 30 hours of litter cleanup and completed an anger management class. No other sheriff's office employees were disciplined or arrested.

=== Electoral defeat ===
In February 2020, Cannon placed longtime Charleston County Sheriff's Deputy Kristin Graziano on unpaid leave after finding out she intended to challenge him in the November 2020 election as a Democrat. Graziano said Cannon ordered her to surrender her badge after 18 years at the sheriff's office, leaving her to live off of accrued vacation pay until it ran out. Charleston County Republican Party Chairman Maurice Washington criticized the firing as a "wrong-headed decision" that "discourages individuals who have every right to seek public office without fear of retribution."

Ethics expenditure disclosures filed with the South Carolina Ethics Commission in July 2020 for Cannon's 2020 re-election campaign showed that the campaign paid a sheriff's office employee $500 to create a Wikipedia page during their off-duty hours. The off-duty employee did not include disclosures required by Wikipedia when creating the article. The off-duty work did not violate South Carolina's ethics rules according to a representative from the South Carolina Ethics Commission. His 2020 opponent, Graziano, said to the Charleston City Paper that the use of employees to perform "paid political work for the department head" was improper and raised ethical questions about "the culture of the department and whether employees are feeling intimidated to support their boss.”

On November 3, 2020, Graziano defeated Cannon. Graziano became the first woman and first openly gay person to win a sheriff's race in South Carolina history. Graziano won with 51.61% (111,200 votes), defeating Cannon with 48.32% (104,107 votes). Graziano was one of 14 new sheriffs elected in South Carolina in 2020. The Post and Courier newspaper highlighted Cannon's defeat in an article about sheriffs who were replaced following "scandal after scandal." In her acceptance speech, Graziano promised to conduct a racial bias audit and financial audit of the sheriff's office. Graziano also promised to "immediately" end the office's participation in U.S. Immigration and Customs Enforcement's 287(g) program, which allowed ICE to house detained immigrants at the Al Cannon Detention Center.

== Personal life ==
Cannon lives in Isle of Palms, a beachside community in Charleston County.

In 1971, Cannon married Wallis Baldwin Cannon, a native of Sumter, South Carolina. Al Cannon III has served as a K-9 deputy at the Greenville County Sheriff's Office in Upstate South Carolina.
