= Linscott, Nebraska =

Unincorporated community in Nebraska, U.S.

Coordinates: 41°44′34″N 100°00′49″W

Linscott is an unincorporated community in Blaine County, Nebraska, United States.

== History ==
A post office was established at Linscott in 1887, and remained in operation until it was discontinued in 1921.
