= Linscott (surname) =

People with the surname Linscott include:

- Eloise Hubbard Linscott (1897–1978), American folklorist
- Gillian Linscott (born 1944), British author
- Glenda Linscott (born 1958), Anglo-Australian actress and director
- James A. Linscott (1846–1913), American lumberman, politician
- Jody Linscott (fl. 20th–21st centuries), Anglo-American musician and author
