= Loving County, Texas =

County in Texas, United States

- County
- Loving County Courthouse, the only two-story building in Mentone, is listed in the National Register of Historic Places

- Seal

- Location within the U.S. state of Texas
- Coordinates: 31°50′N 103°34′W
- Country: United States
- State: Texas
- Founded: February 26, 1887
- Named for: Oliver Loving
- Seat: Mentone
- Largest community: Mentone

Area
  - Total: 680 sq mi (1,750 km^{2})
  - Land: 669 sq mi (1,732 km^{2})
  - Water: 7.7 sq mi (20 km^{2}) 1.1%

Population (2020)
  - Total: 64
  - Estimate (2025): 52 ▼
  - Density: 0.065/sq mi (0.025/km^{2})
- Time zone: UTC−6 (Central)
  - Summer (DST): UTC−5 (CDT)
- Congressional district: 23rd
- Website: www.co.loving.tx.us

Loving County is a county in the U.S. state of Texas. With a population of 64 according to the 2020 census, it is the least populous county in the United States with a permanent population. Its county seat and only community is Mentone.

Loving County was originally split off Reeves County in 1887. It was merged back into Reeves County ten years later, and was reorganized in 1931. It is located in West Texas, just south of the New Mexico state border. Reeves County is to its south and west, Ward County is to its south, and Winkler County is to its east.

== History ==
Nomadic hunters inhabited the area during prehistory. Antonio de Espejo traveled in the area in 1583, and crossed the Pecos River. Immigrants used a ford, later named Pope's Crossing, for travel in the 1840s. John Pope surveyed the area in 1854, for the building of a transcontinental railroad. He created a camp in 1855, and conducted three drilling attempts, but only found water once and was unable to access it. Andrew A. Humphreys ordered Pope to end his drilling and abandon the camp on July 10, 1858. Soldiers were stationed at the camp created by Pope from 1858 to 1861. The route of the Butterfield Overland Mail went through the area.

Oliver Loving, after whom the county was named, and Charles Goodnight drove cattle through the area in 1866, creating the Goodnight–Loving Trail. Loving was shot by a Comanche native in 1867, and died from gangrene. The area was a part of Bexar County from 1837 to 1874, when it became a part of Tom Green County. Eleven people in the area, including Clay Allison, petitioned to the 19th session of the Texas Legislature to become a part of Reeves County. Loving County was created in 1887, by House Bill No. 113, although it was to be attached to Reeves County for certain purposes, including judicial and surveying.

Six men from Denver came to the county in 1893, and founded the Loving Canal and Irrigation Company and Mentone, which was named by a French surveyor for his home of Menton, France. On June 13, the men filed a petition with 150 signatures to the Reeves County Commissioners Court requesting the organization of the county and it was accepted. The county organization was approved by an election held on July 8, with 83 voters participating, and Mentone became the county seat. Another election was held in 1894, and both elections held in the county are believed to have been fraudulent. The county commission issued bonds worth $6,000 to construct a courthouse in Mentone, but the project was not completed as a flood in August destroyed the work that was done on the irrigation project. Accusations of illegal county organization arose, which were investigated by H. C. Withers and A. H. Randolph. They were informed by W. A. Hunter, the sheriff and tax collector, that R. G. Munn, the county clerk, had taken the tax records to Denver. All of the county officials had left the county by 1897, and the county was dissolved on May 12, 1897, and returned to Reeves County.

In December 1896, Hunter traveled to Pecos, Texas, but went missing with his horses either dying from starvation or being unaccounted for. His sister, Jennie M. Mettler, attempted to receive the $15,000 in life insurance that Hunter took out in November, but the insurance company refused to pay, as Hunter's body was not discovered. She filed a lawsuit and won in the first case and in the appeal made by the company to the Supreme Court of the United States. Hunter was found living in Birmingham, Alabama, under the name of Al Hunt in 1902. He had abandoned one of his horses, while riding the other one, to take a train from Barstow, Texas. He was sentenced to serve five years in prison, but his conviction was overturned on appeal.

The county has no cemetery, and the only grave in the area is for Shady Davis, a 21-year-old cowboy who was killed by his horse and buried 12 miles from Mentone in the 1920s. The population in the area increased following the discovery of oil, and led to the creation of the town of Ramsey. Loving County was reorganized in 1931, becoming the only county in Texas to be organized twice, and Ramsey was later renamed as Mentone.

On November 17, 2020, during the COVID-19 pandemic, Loving County became the last county in the contiguous United States to confirm at least one case of COVID-19, with three cases confirmed in the area. Earlier in August, a nonresident male at a man camp was confirmed to have contracted it. Additionally, at least two residents who had contracted it elsewhere returned to Loving County and quarantined, but those cases were not counted in the county's totals. In 2023, a social media influencer from Indiana named Malcolm Tanner announced his intent to create a new settlement for Black people in Loving County with affordable housing, job opportunities, and to gain political influence. Tanner hoped to move enough followers to the county to take control of its budget, reportedly $60 million dollars. He managed to move up to 30 of his followers into the county in RVs and tents on his property. Texas later sued him for health code violations; litigation is ongoing as of 2026.

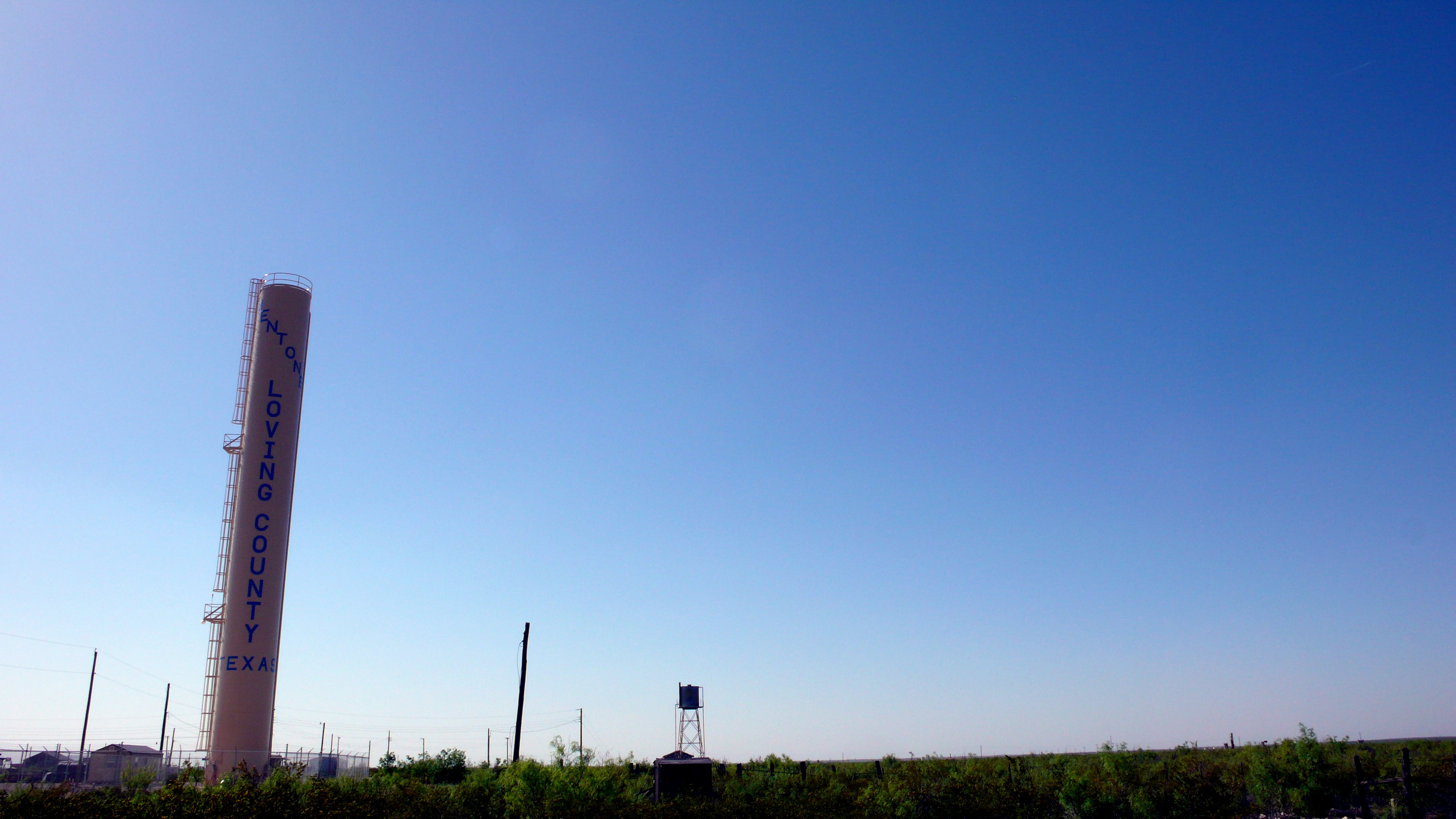
A water tower in Loving County

== Geography ==
A picture of Mentone, Loving County

The county is three-fifths the size of Rhode Island. According to the United States Census Bureau, the county has a total area of 677 square miles (1,750 km^{2}), of which 7.8 square miles (20 km^{2}) (1.1%) are covered by water.

Water in the area has to be imported from Kermit or Pecos, Texas, due to the groundwater in the area containing gypsum; the Pecos River was previously used for water before its salinity became too high. The Pecos River is the county's western boundary, forming the Red Bluff Reservoir along its northwestern border with Reeves County and Eddy County, New Mexico. The terrain of Loving County is described as flat desert, with a few low hills. Desert shrubs, range grasses, and cacti abound, with salt cedars along the river. Elevations vary from 2,686 to 3,311 feet (819 to 1,009 m) above sea level.

Loving is the smallest county by area in the Permian Basin region.

=== Major highways ===
- State Highway 302
- Ranch to Market Road 652
- Farm to Market Road 1933

=== Adjacent counties ===
- Lea County, New Mexico (north/Mountain Time Zone)
- Winkler County (east)
- Ward County (southeast)
- Reeves County (southwest)
- Eddy County, New Mexico (northwest/Mountain Time Zone)

== Communities ==
=== Census-designated places ===
- Mentone (county seat)

=== Ghost towns ===
- Hay Flat (mostly in Winkler County)
- Porterville
- Woody

== Demographics ==
Historical population
Census	Pop.	Note	%±
1890	3		—
1900	33		1,000.0%
1910	249		654.5%
1920	82		−67.1%
1930	195		137.8%
1940	285		46.2%
1950	227		−20.4%
1960	226		−0.4%
1970	164		−27.4%
1980	91		−44.5%
1990	107		17.6%
2000	67		−37.4%
2010	82		22.4%
2020	64		−22.0%
2025 (est.)	52	▼	−18.7%
U.S. Decennial Census; 1850–2010 2010–2020

=== 2020 census ===
As of the 2020 census, there were 64 people, 25 households, and 18 families residing in the county.

Of the 25 households, 52.0% had children under the age of 18 living in them, 52.0% were married-couple households, 36.0% were households with a male householder and no spouse or partner present, and 4.0% were households with a female householder and no spouse or partner present. About 24.0% of all households were made up of individuals and 4.0% had someone living alone who was 65 years of age or older.

The median age was 34.5 years; 37.5% of residents were under the age of 18 and 18.8% of residents were 65 years of age or older. For every 100 females there were 137.0 males, and for every 100 females age 18 and over there were 122.2 males age 18 and over.

There were 34 housing units, of which 26.5% were vacant. Among occupied housing units, 80.0% were owner-occupied and 20.0% were renter-occupied. The homeowner vacancy rate was 4.8% and the rental vacancy rate was <0.1%.

The racial makeup of the county was 87.5% White, <0.1% Black or African American, 1.6% American Indian and Alaska Native, <0.1% Asian, <0.1% Native Hawaiian and Pacific Islander, 1.6% from some other race, and 9.4% from two or more races. Hispanic or Latino residents of any race comprised 1.6% of the population.

All residents were classified as living in rural areas.

The county is the least-populous county in the United States, with a 2020 census population of 64 (a decrease of 22.0% versus the 2010 figure of 82).

From 2018 to 2022, the median household income for the county was $141,373, up from $84,306 in 2010. Owing partly to its small and dispersed population, it had the highest median per capita and household incomes of any county in Texas.

=== Racial and ethnic composition ===
Loving County, Texas – Racial and ethnic composition Note: the US Census treats Hispanic/Latino as an ethnic category. This table excludes Latinos from the racial categories and assigns them to a separate category. Hispanics/Latinos may be of any race.
Race / Ethnicity (NH = Non-Hispanic)	Pop 1980	Pop 1990	Pop 2000	Pop 2010	Pop 2020	% 1980	% 1990	% 2000	% 2010	% 2020
White alone (NH)	75	93	60	60	56	82.42%	86.92%	89.55%	73.17%	87.50%
Black or African American alone (NH)	0	0	0	0	0	0.00%	0.00%	0.00%	0.00%	0.00%
Native American or Alaska Native alone (NH)	0	0	0	4	1	0.00%	0.00%	0.00%	4.88%	1.56%
Asian alone (NH)	0	0	0	0	0	0.00%	0.00%	0.00%	0.00%	0.00%
Native Hawaiian or Pacific Islander alone (NH)	x	x	0	0	0	x	x	0.00%	0.00%	0.00%
Other race alone (NH)	0	0	0	0	1	0.00%	0.00%	0.00%	0.00%	1.56%
Mixed race or Multiracial (NH)	x	x	0	0	5	x	x	0.00%	0.00%	7.81%
Hispanic or Latino (any race)	16	14	7	18	1	17.58%	13.08%	10.45%	21.95%	1.56%
Total	91	107	67	82	64	100.00%	100.00%	100.00%	100.00%	100.00%

=== 2010 census ===
As of the 2010 census, there were 82 people, 39 households, and 20 families resided in the county. The population density was 0.1 inhabitants per square mile (0.0/km^{2}). There were 50 housing units. The racial makeup of the county was 79.3% White, 0.0% African American, 4.9% Native American, 0.0% Asian, 0.0% Pacific Islander, 8.5% from Some Other Races and 7.3% from two or more races. Hispanic or Latino of any race were 21.95% of the population.

=== 2000 census ===
As of the 2000 census, there were 67 people, 31 households, and 19 families living in the county. The population density was 0.1 inhabitants per square mile (0.0/km^{2}). There were 70 housing units at an average density of 0.1 inhabitants per square mile (0.0/km^{2}).

Three people were living in the county, all males in the same house, according to the 1890 census. Following the disestablishment of Mentone in 1897, no settlements were in the county until the creation of Juanita in 1910, which was renamed to Porterville. The 1970 census recorded the county as the least-populated county in the United States.

== Politics and government ==
Presidential election results by precinct in Loving County, 2000–2024

2000
Republican:
- 80–90%
- 70–80%

2004
Republican:
- 90–100%
- 80–90%
- 70–80%

2008
Republican:
- 90–100%
- 80–90%
- 70–80%

2012
Republican:
- 90–100%
- 80–90%

2016
Republican:
- 90–100%
- 80–90%
- 70–80%

2020
Republican:
- 90–100%
- 80–90%

2024
Republican:
- 90–100%
- 70–80%

United States presidential election results for Loving County, Texas
Year	Republican		Democratic		Third party(ies)	
Year	No.	%	No.	%	No.	%
1908	0	0.00%	3	100.00%	0	0.00%
1924	2	14.29%	12	85.71%	0	0.00%
1928	6	37.50%	10	62.50%	0	0.00%
1932	27	12.56%	187	86.98%	1	0.47%
1936	21	12.88%	118	72.39%	24	14.72%
1940	21	17.65%	98	82.35%	0	0.00%
1944	18	21.43%	60	71.43%	6	7.14%
1948	29	30.53%	62	65.26%	4	4.21%
1952	71	74.74%	24	25.26%	0	0.00%
1956	55	60.44%	36	39.56%	0	0.00%
1960	42	44.21%	46	48.42%	7	7.37%
1964	32	40.51%	46	58.23%	1	1.27%
1968	23	28.40%	18	22.22%	40	49.38%
1972	55	88.71%	7	11.29%	0	0.00%
1976	47	54.65%	35	40.70%	4	4.65%
1980	50	69.44%	22	30.56%	0	0.00%
1984	57	78.08%	16	21.92%	0	0.00%
1988	54	70.13%	23	29.87%	0	0.00%
1992	31	32.29%	20	20.83%	45	46.88%
1996	48	62.34%	14	18.18%	15	19.48%
2000	124	79.49%	29	18.59%	3	1.92%
2004	65	81.25%	12	15.00%	3	3.75%
2008	67	84.81%	12	15.19%	0	0.00%
2012	54	84.38%	9	14.06%	1	1.56%
2016	58	89.23%	4	6.15%	3	4.62%
2020	60	90.91%	4	6.06%	2	3.03%
2024	86	88.66%	10	10.31%	1	1.03%

United States Senate election results for Loving County, Texas1
Year	Republican		Democratic		Third party(ies)	
Year	No.	%	No.	%	No.	%
2024	75	78.95%	17	17.89%	3	3.16%

United States Senate election results for Loving County, Texas2
Year	Republican		Democratic		Third party(ies)	
Year	No.	%	No.	%	No.	%
2020	58	89.23%	5	7.69%	2	3.08%
2026	53	79.10%	12	17.91%	2	2.99%

Texas Gubernatorial election results for Loving County
Year	Republican		Democratic		Third party(ies)	
Year	No.	%	No.	%	No.	%
2022	70	88.61%	6	7.59%	3	3.80%
2026	56	82.35%	9	13.24%	3	4.41%

Since the 1988 election, early voting has accounted for at least 13.11% of votes in the county, with early voting accounting for a majority of the votes in the 1994 election with 53.54%, 1998 election with 50%, 2000 election with 74.36%, 2006 election with 58.89%, and 2020 election with 68.18%. The lowest voter turnout since the 1988 election was in the 2018 election with 49% and the highest in the 1990 election with 85.71%. The county had the highest voter turnout in Texas in the 1986 election. At some points in the county's history, the county had more registered voters than residents and precincts closed early to deny people the ability to vote.

J. J. Combs was appointed as county judge by the county commission on September 6, 1893. Edna Reed Clayton DeWees served as sheriff in the county from 1946 to 1948, making her the first woman to be elected as a sheriff in Texas.

The county judge is the highest elected official in the county and the position has been held by Skeet Jones since 2007. The Creager family once had family members who served as county judge, postmaster, sheriff, tax assessor, and county commission member. The Joneses are a political family in the county with members of the family controlling the positions of judge, clerk, attorney, and constable. The Jones family is a ranching family who moved to the county when Elgin "Punk" Jones and Mary Belle Jones built their ranch in 1953. Punk served as the sheriff for 28 years and Mary Belle served as the chief appraiser. The top elected official of Loving County, Judge Skeet Jones, and three other individuals were arrested in 2022 for stealing livestock.

In 2022, Sheriff Chris Busse reported that a ranch with 11 registered voters, including county commissioner Ysidro Renteria, had no inhabitants since 2008.

Loving was one of only four counties in Texas to give a plurality of the vote to independent presidential candidate Ross Perot in 1992.

== Economy ==
Three cattle businesses were in the county in 1887, with 12,100 cattle worth $96,800, and the county had a livestock value of $568,406 in 1900. Taxes were not collected in the area from 1893 to 1896. The Toyah-Bell Oil Company, created in 1921, became the first oil producer in the county later that year. Oil production in the area reached its height in 1931, with 1,233,801 barrels.

The county accounted for 0.057% of the wealth in Texas in 1970, and had no unemployment or any residents on welfare. The county had the sixth-highest unemployment rate in the country in 1986, with 29.7% unemployment. The Texas Almanac listed 15 ranches in the county in 1986–1987, with the average size being above 23,000 acres and being worth above an average of $4 million. The county has one of the highest per capita incomes in the United States due to oil revenue, with its residents having a per capita income of $32,505 in 1983, compared to the national average of $9,496. In 1986, taxes on oil and gas companies accounted for 99% of tax revenue in the county.

Loving County's economy is based almost entirely upon oil and gas production, ranching, and county services.

== Education ==
No federal funding was ever given to schools in the county as of 1970, and its school was still racially segregated. In 1970, the elementary school had 30 students and three teachers, while the 17 high school students were educated in Winkler County. The elementary school in Mentone was closed in 1978, as the school only had two students and two teachers left and the county voted to consolidate into the Wink-Loving Independent School District. The county is zoned to Wink-Loving Independent School District and Odessa College.

== In popular culture ==
"Loving County" is the name of a song written and performed by Charlie Robison. It appears on his 1998 album Life of the Party. In the novel Echo Burning by Lee Child, Jack Reacher passes through Loving County.

== See also ==
- National Register of Historic Places listings in Loving County, Texas
- Recorded Texas Historic Landmarks in Loving County
