= Mentone, Texas =

- Census-designated place
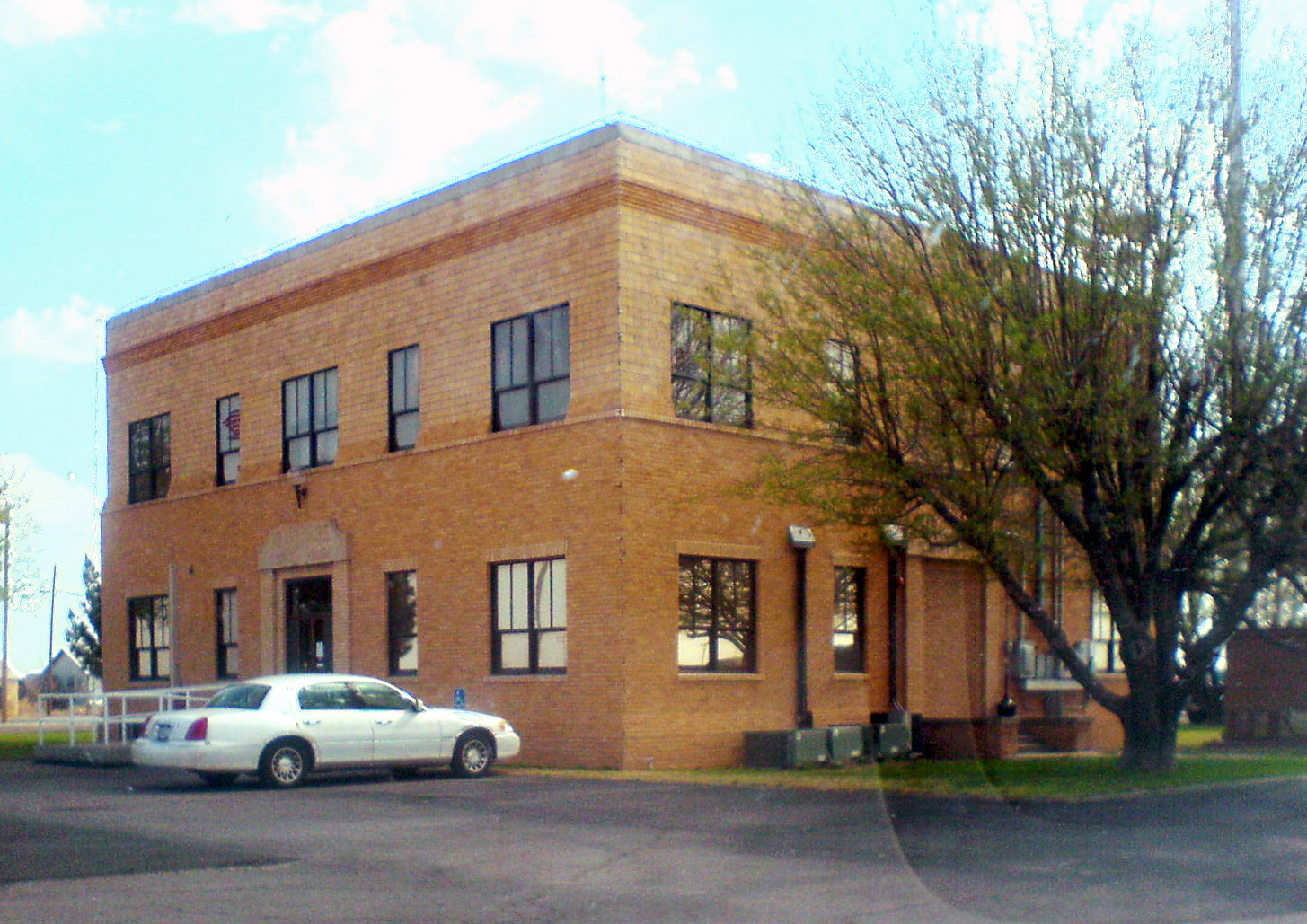
- Loving County Courthouse, the only two-story building in Mentone, is listed in the National Register of Historic Places.

- Location in Texas Location in the United States
- Coordinates: 31°42′23″N 103°35′54″W
- Country: United States
- State: Texas
- County: Loving
- Founded: 1931

Area
  - Total: 0.17 sq mi (0.44 km^{2})
  - Land: 0.17 sq mi (0.44 km^{2})
  - Water: 0 sq mi (0.0 km^{2})
- Elevation: 2,684 ft (818 m)

Population (2020)
  - Total: 22
  - Density: 130/sq mi (50/km^{2})
- Time zone: UTC-6 (Central (CST))
  - Summer (DST): UTC-5 (CDT)
- ZIP code: 79754
- Area code: 432
- FIPS code: 48-47676
- GNIS feature ID: 1362622

Mentone (/ˌmɛnˈtoʊn/) is an unincorporated community, a census-designated place (CDP) in and the county seat of Loving County, Texas, United States. As of 2020, its population was 22, up from 19 in 2010, almost one-quarter of the county's 82 people at the time.

Mentone was, until recent years, the least-populated unincorporated county seat in the United States, but lost that distinction with the 2010 census to Gann Valley, South Dakota, which had a population of 14. Mentone was designated a Recorded Texas Historic Landmark in 1967 as the "Smallest County Seat in Texas". Mentone is also the only community in Loving County, Texas.

== History ==
Named after Menton, France, by a French surveyor, present-day Mentone is actually the second such named community in Loving County; an earlier Mentone was founded south of the current town in 1893, but was abandoned in 1905. A second town on that site was called Juanita and then Porterville, but was deserted anew when Mentone was re-established in 1931, with most residents moving to the new town. The town on the current site was named Ramsey before being renamed. During its heyday, Mentone boasted five cafes, five gas stations, two hotels, two drugstores, two recreation halls, two barbershops, a dance hall, a machine shop, and a dry cleaner. It also had its own newspaper, the Mentone Monitor, which published from 1932 to 1935.

After reaching a high population mark around 600 residents in the 1930s, its population has declined ever since, and in 2000, it had only 15 people, "more or less", according to National Geographic (the total population of Loving County itself, as of 2020, was 64).

Today, according to National Geographic, Mentone contains little more than a courthouse, two stop signs, a gas station, a post office, and a school building (which has since been demolished, as enrollment fell to just two pupils and was merged with nearby Wink schools in the 1970s). A volunteer fire department serves the town, but no hospitals or cemeteries are there, and no doctors or lawyers. Until 1988, Mentone had no potable water of its own; local wells yielded water with a high mineral content that clogged pipes and killed grass. Drinking water was trucked in from Pecos, 23 miles (37 km) away, until improvements started in 2010 that guaranteed the potability of Mentone's water.

Mentone's tiny church (the oldest building in Loving County) is visited every Saturday by a minister from a nearby town who holds interdenominational services there.

Mentone was the home of the first elected female sheriff in Texas, Edna Reed Clayton DeWees, who was appointed to the job in January 1945, then won an election to continue in the office through 1947. She never carried a firearm, and reported only two arrests during her entire term. This is not unusual in Loving County; since the inception of the county, fewer than 200 criminal cases have been filed in District Court. Later, DeWees returned as county and district clerk, a job she held from 1965 to 1986. In Loving County, the posts of county clerk, probate clerk, and district clerk are managed by the same official. DeWees died January 22, 2009, having survived her husbands George Clayton and Lawrence DeWees.

=== Free Town Project ===
In February 2006, Mentone became the focus of a New York Times article detailing an alleged attempt by Lawrence Pendarvis, a man convicted of 129 counts of possession of child pornography, Bobby Emory, and Don Duncan to "take over" the town and Loving County. According to the article, Pendarvis and his associates, part of the "Free Town Project", planned to buy parcels of land in the county, then move in enough of their supporters to outvote earlier residents and take control of local government.

According to a website for Pendarvis' movement, their objectives were to "Remove oppressive regulations... and stop enforcement of laws prohibiting victimless acts among consenting adults" Additionally, the group sought "to ensure that the sheriff's office or the town police are never allowed to waste valuable town resources... to oppress our residents by the investigation or enforcement of violations of laws that punish truancy, drug trafficking, prostitution, obscenity, organ trafficking, and other victimless 'crimes'."

Although Pendarvis, Emory, and Duncan claimed to have legally bought 126 acres (51 ha) in Loving County in 2005, and registered to vote accordingly, the county sheriff, Billy Burt Hopper, determined that this land had been sold to a different buyer. Misdemeanor charges were filed against the three men, who had left the state by this time. Pendarvis claimed to have a cancelled check to prove his purchase of the land in question, but no deed was ever produced, and the original landowners denied having sold land to Pendarvis or his associates. The three were subsequently featured on a "wanted" poster issued by Sheriff Hopper and the local Texas Rangers (displayed at Hopper's office), and threatened with arrest should they return to Loving County. As of 2017, Pendarvis' website is no longer operational.

=== Second takeover attempt ===
In October 2025, the State of Texas filed a lawsuit aiming to stop social media figure Malcolm Tanner from offering "free homes" and money to people who settled on land near Mentone owned by Tanner. According to the suit, Tanner's property lacks running water or sewer access, and features no houses. Instead, around 30 of his followers, mostly Black women and children, were living in recreational vehicles and tents. Tanner had promoted the project on social media as part of an attempt to take over Loving County and get his preferred candidates elected. He has also advertised himself as a candidate for U.S. President in 2028.

== Geography ==
Mentone is located in southwestern Loving County at an elevation of 2,684 feet (818 m). It is situated on State Highway 302, 77 miles (124 km) west of Odessa and 22 miles (35 km) north of Pecos. According to the U.S. Census Bureau, the Mentone CDP has an area of 0.2 square miles (0.4 km^{2}), all land. The town is 1.5 miles (2.4 km) east of the Pecos River.

=== Climate ===
Mentone experiences an arid desert climate with hot summers and cool winters. Due to Mentone's aridity, the diurnal temperature variation is substantial, and helps lower nighttime temperatures. Most precipitation falls in the summer and early fall.

Climate data for Mentone, Texas
Month	Jan	Feb	Mar	Apr	May	Jun	Jul	Aug	Sep	Oct	Nov	Dec	Year
Record high °F (°C)	86 (30)	89 (32)	99 (37)	102 (39)	106 (41)	111 (44)	112 (44)	111 (44)	106 (41)	100 (38)	88 (31)	83 (28)	112 (44)
Mean daily maximum °F (°C)	61.6 (16.4)	62.6 (17.0)	72.9 (22.7)	82.3 (27.9)	91.9 (33.3)	97.4 (36.3)	98.6 (37.0)	96.9 (36.1)	90.7 (32.6)	81.2 (27.3)	70.6 (21.4)	58.9 (14.9)	80.5 (26.9)
Mean daily minimum °F (°C)	28.0 (−2.2)	31.1 (−0.5)	38.5 (3.6)	47.1 (8.4)	56.0 (13.3)	65.3 (18.5)	70.2 (21.2)	67.7 (19.8)	60.8 (16.0)	46.6 (8.1)	36.7 (2.6)	27.8 (−2.3)	48.0 (8.9)
Record low °F (°C)	5 (−15)	5 (−15)	12 (−11)	16 (−9)	31 (−1)	46 (8)	60 (16)	53 (12)	39 (4)	30 (−1)	18 (−8)	16 (−9)	5 (−15)
Average precipitation inches (mm)	0.41 (10)	0.31 (7.9)	0.24 (6.1)	0.28 (7.1)	0.86 (22)	0.89 (23)	1.74 (44)	1.29 (33)	1.39 (35)	1.03 (26)	0.33 (8.4)	0.29 (7.4)	9.06 (230)
Source: The Western Regional Climate Center

== Demographics ==
Historical population
Census	Pop.	Note	%±
2010	19		—
2020	22		15.8%
U.S. Decennial Census; 1850–1900 1910; 1920 1930 1940; 1950 1960 1970; 1980 1990 2000; 2010 2020

Since 2010, Mentone has been included in the larger Mentone, Texas census-designated place delineated by the United States Census Bureau for its purposes in compiling, storing, and analyzing census data. Because of this, demographics taken from this census apply to the entire CDP and not just the community proper.

Mentone CDP, Texas – Racial and ethnic composition Note: the US Census treats Hispanic/Latino as an ethnic category. This table excludes Latinos from the racial categories and assigns them to a separate category. Hispanics/Latinos may be of any race.
Race / Ethnicity (NH = Non-Hispanic)	Pop 2010	Pop 2020	% 2010	% 2020
White alone (NH)	14	17	73.68%	77.27%
Black or African American alone (NH)	0	0	0.00%	0.00%
Native American or Alaska Native alone (NH)	1	1	5.26%	4.55%
Asian alone (NH)	0	0	0.00%	0.00%
Native Hawaiian or Pacific Islander alone (NH)	0	0	0.00%	0.00%
Other race alone (NH)	0	1	0.00%	4.55%
Multiracial (NH)	0	2	0.00%	9.09%
Hispanic or Latino (any race)	4	1	21.05%	4.55%
Total	19	22	100.00%	100.00%

As of the 2020 United States census, 22 people, seven households, and three families were residing in the CDP.

== Education ==
Mentone is served by the Wink-Loving Independent School District. Loving County's school system was closed and consolidated into Wink's ISD in 1972 because the enrollment had fallen to two students. All of Loving County is zoned to Odessa College.

== See also ==
- Loving County Courthouse
