= National Register of Historic Places listings in Cass County, Texas =

Location of Cass County in Texas

This is a list of the National Register of Historic Places listings in Cass County, Texas.

This is intended to be a complete list of properties listed on the National Register of Historic Places in Cass County, Texas. There are five properties listed on the National Register in the county. Three are Recorded Texas Historic Landmarks including one that is also a State Antiquities Landmark.

This National Park Service list is complete through NPS recent listings posted September 18, 2026.

== Current listings ==
The locations of National Register properties may be seen in a mapping service provided.

	Name on the Register	Image	Date listed	Location	City or town	Description
1	Atlanta-Miller Grade School		May 29, 2026 (#100013125)	200 W. Miller Street; 33°07′03″N 94°10′05″W	Atlanta	
2	Cass County Courthouse	Cass County Courthouse	May 25, 1979 (#79002924)	Public Sq. 33°00′40″N 94°21′54″W	Linden	State Antiquities Landmark, Recorded Texas Historic Landmark
3	Macedonia School Vocational Building		January 15, 2026 (#100012546)	207 Grubbs St. 33°00′34″N 94°22′39″W	Linden	
4	Mathews–Powell House	Mathews–Powell House	September 22, 1977 (#77001431)	Miller St. 33°08′59″N 94°08′50″W	Queen City	Recorded Texas Historic Landmark
5	Pleasant Hill School	Pleasant Hill School	August 20, 2004 (#04000891)	2722 FM 1399; 33°03′11″N 94°23′46″W	Linden	Recorded Texas Historic Landmark

== See also ==
- National Register of Historic Places listings in Texas
- Recorded Texas Historic Landmarks in Cass County
