= National Register of Historic Places listings in Camp County, Texas =

This is a list of the National Register of Historic Places listings in Camp County, Texas.

This is intended to be a complete list of properties and districts listed on the National Register of Historic Places in Camp County, Texas. There is one district listed in the county. This district also contains Recorded Texas Historic Landmarks.

This National Park Service list is complete through NPS recent listings posted March 21, 2025.

== Current listing ==
The locations of National Register properties and districts may be seen in a mapping service provided.

	Name on the Register	Image	Date listed	Location	City or town	Description
1	Pittsburg Commercial Historic District	Pittsburg Commercial Historic District	April 16, 2013 (#13000175)	Along Marshall, Quitman, Jefferson, Church, and College Sts, roughly from Cypress St. to North St. 32°59′47″N 94°58′00″W	Pittsburg	Includes Recorded Texas Historic Landmarks

== See also ==
- National Register of Historic Places listings in Texas
- Recorded Texas Historic Landmarks in Camp County
