= Pittsburg Commercial Historic District =

- U.S. National Register of Historic Places
- U.S. Historic district
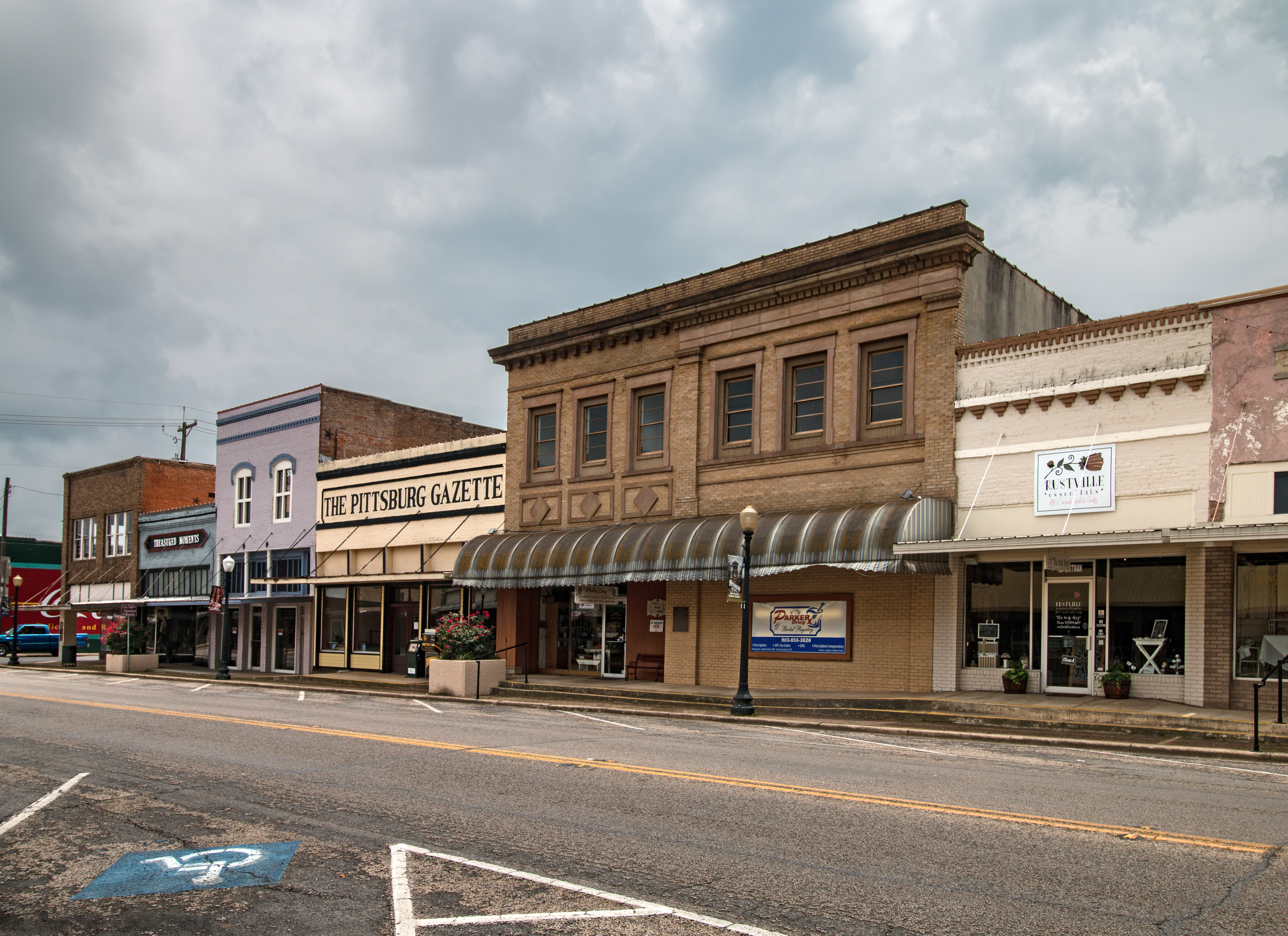
- 100 blk. Quitman St. in 2017

- Location within Texas Location within the United States
- Location: Along Marshall, Quitman, Jefferson, Church, and College Sts, roughly from Cypress St. to North St., Pittsburg, Texas
- Coordinates: 32°59′47″N 94°58′00″W
- Area: 32 acres (13 ha)
- Architect: James E. Flanders, Smith & Prager; Shirley Simons & Sons
- Architectural style: Classical Revival, Queen Anne, commercial block
- NRHP reference No.: 13000175
- Added to NRHP: April 16, 2013

The Pittsburg Commercial Historic District, in Pittsburg, Texas, is a 32 acres (13 ha) historic district which was listed on the National Register of Historic Places in 2013. It included 66 contributing buildings and one contributing site, as well as 21 non-contributing buildings. Four buildings within the district are Recorded Texas Historic Landmarks (RTHL).

The district runs along Marshall, Quitman, Jefferson, Church, and College Sts, roughly from Cypress St. to North St.

It includes works by James E. Flanders, Smith & Prager, and by Shirley Simons & Sons. It includes Classical Revival, Queen Anne, and commercial block architecture.

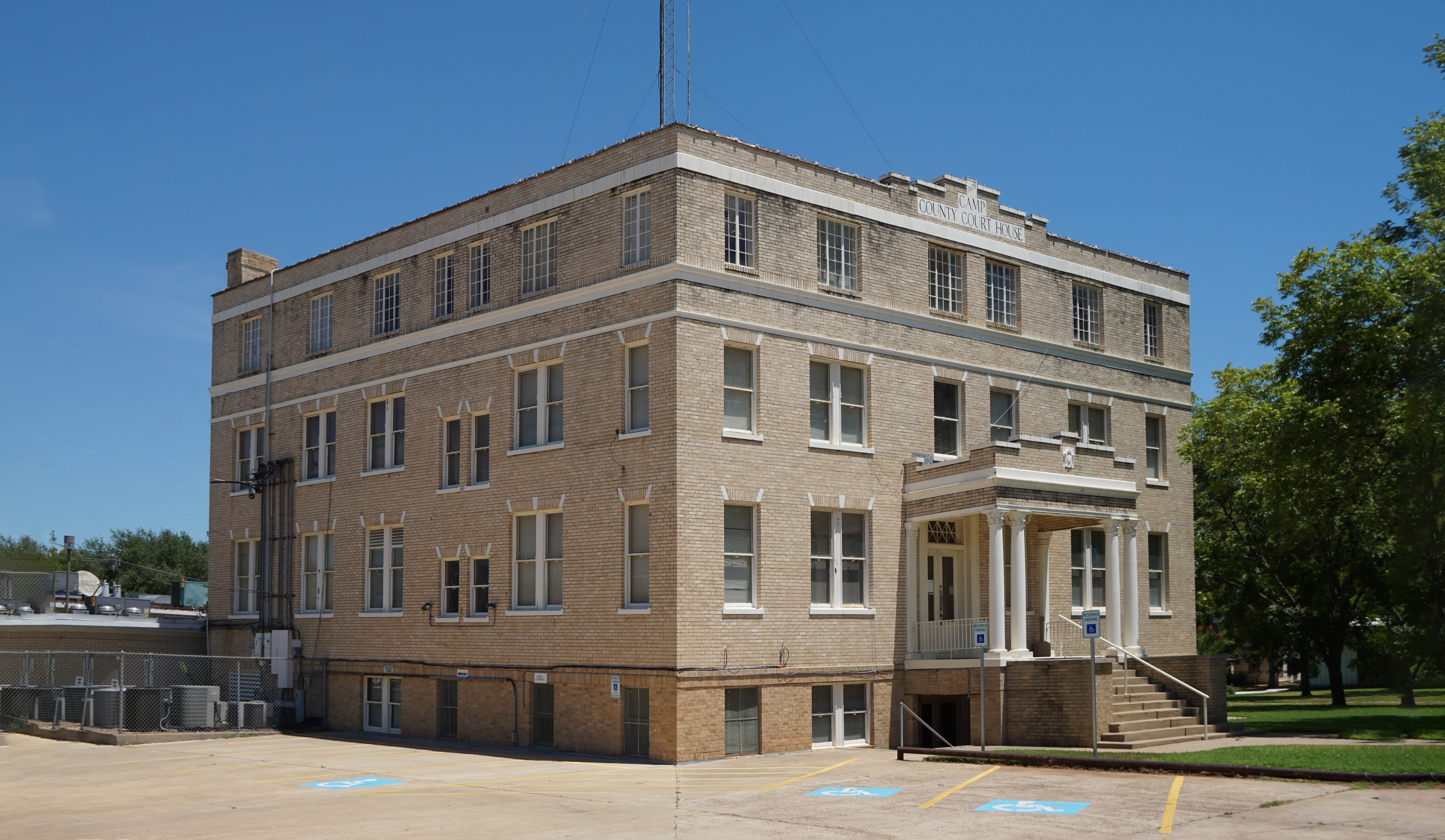
Camp County Courthouse

Its notable buildings include:

- Camp County Courthouse (RTHL #13073, 2004), 1928, 126 Church St.

- Cotton Belt Depot (RTHL #9793, 1991), 1901, 170 W. Marshall St.

- First United Methodist Church (RTHL #9796, 1976), 1904, 115 Mt. Pleasant St.
- Former U.S. Post Office, 1925, 145 Jefferson St.
- Former Pittsburg Fire Station, 1927, 132 Jefferson St.
- Frank Sexton Lodge #206 of A.F. & A.M., 1931, 202 Jefferson St.
- Southwestern Bell Telephone, 1940, 134 Mt. Pleasant St.

- W. L. Garrett & Sons building (RTHL #9797, 1990), 1890, 102 Quitman St.

== See also ==
- National Register of Historic Places listings in Camp County, Texas
- Recorded Texas Historic Landmarks in Camp County
