= Gruene Family Home =

Historic house in Texas, United States

- H. D. Gruene Mansion
- U.S. Historic district – Contributing property
- Recorded Texas Historic Landmark
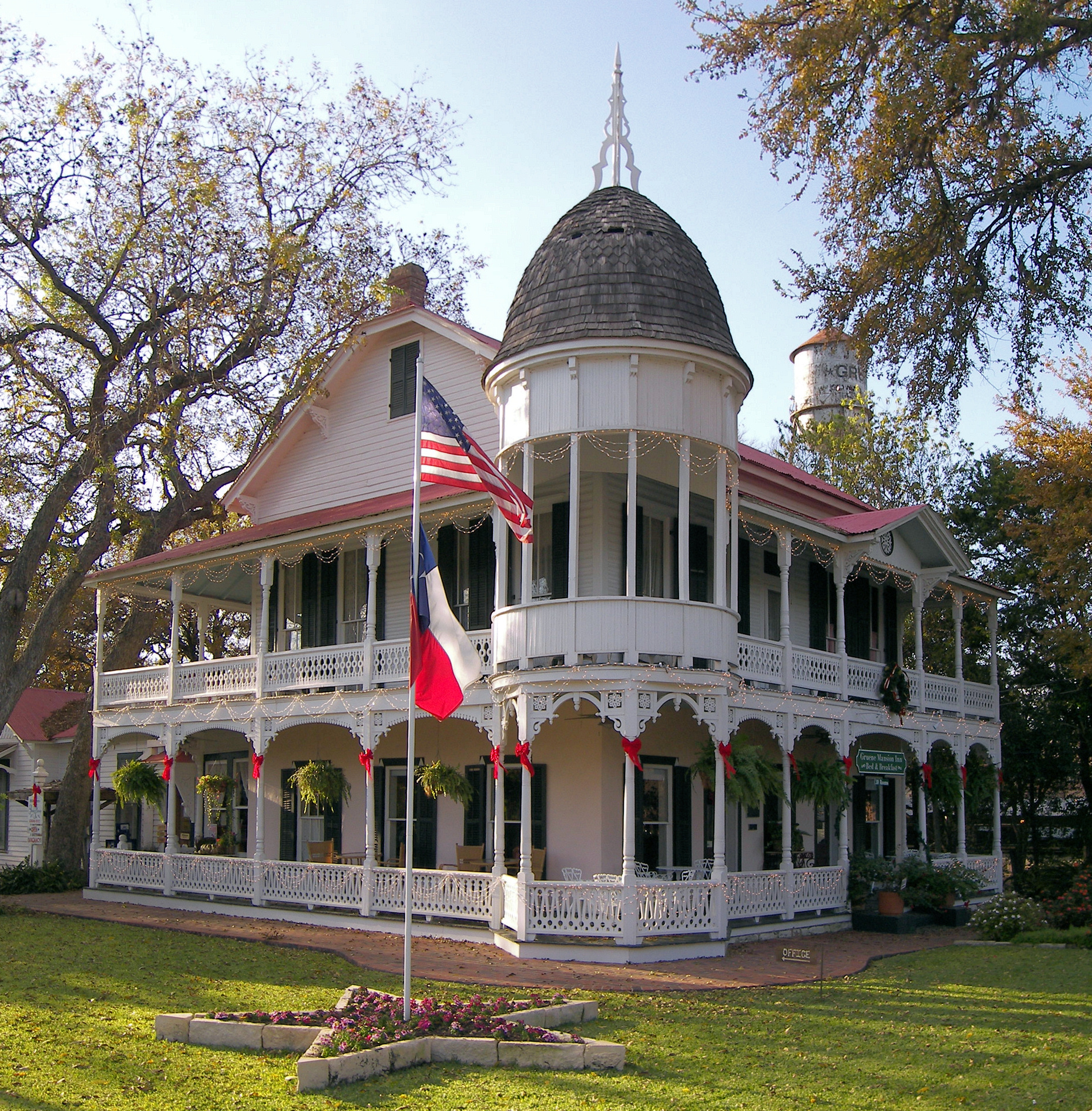
- The Henry Gruene Family Home decorated for Christmas in 2007
- Location: Gruene, Texas
- Coordinates: 29°44′17″N 98°6′15″W
- Built: 1872
- Built by: Christian Herry
- Architect: H.D. Gruene
- Architectural style: Late Victorian
- Part of: Gruene Historic District (ID75001962)
- RTHL No.: 2295

Significant dates
- Designated CP: April 21, 1975
- Designated RTHL: 1984

The Henry Gruene Family Home is a Victorian-style house that was constructed in 1872. The Gruene Family Home, though not listed individually on the National Register of Historic Places, is a contributing property to Gruene Historic District, which was listed in 1974. Presently, the home operates as the Gruene Mansion Inn in the Gruene Community of New Braunfels, Texas. Deep in tradition, the mansion was one of the first buildings in Gruene, in 1872. The Gruene Mansion Inn began as H.D. Gruene's historic Eastlake Victorian home and cotton plantation. All current accommodations are century-old barns and homes restored to our own Victorian Rustic Elegance - A combination of antiques, fine fabrics, and handmade furniture. Every room has a unique character and offers details such as clawfoot tubs and deep pedestal sinks. Gruene Mansion Inn is listed as one of the top inns in the state of Texas.

== See also ==
- National Register of Historic Places listings in Comal County, Texas
- Recorded Texas Historic Landmarks in Comal County
