= List of Recorded Texas Historic Landmarks (Cameron-Duval) =

The following is a partial list of Recorded Texas Historic Landmarks (RTHLs) arranged by county as designated by the Texas Historical Commission and local county historical commissions in Texas. This page includes RTHLs in these counties: Cameron, Camp, Carson, Cass, Castro, Chambers, Cherokee, Childress, Clay, Cochran, Coke, Coleman, Collin, Collingsworth, Colorado, Comal, Comanche, Concho, Cooke, Coryell, Cottle, Crane, Crockett, Crosby, Culberson, Dallam, Dallas, Dawson, DeWitt, Deaf Smith, Delta, Denton, Dickens, Dimmit, Donley, and Duval.

Recorded Texas Historic Landmarks listed by county
Anderson-Callahan • Cameron-Duval • Eastland-Gray • Grayson-Hudspeth • Hunt-Martin • Mason-Rusk • Sabine-Travis • Trinity-Zavala

KEY

Landmarks with multiple historic designations are colored according to their highest designation within the following hierarchy.

⁕ Listed individually on the National Register of Historic Places (NRHP) as a National Historic Landmark
⁂ Listed on the NRHP as a contributing property of a National Historic Landmark District
† Listed individually on the NRHP
‡ Listed as a contributing property of an NRHP Historic District
§ Listed individually as or as part of a State Historic Site
# Listed individually as or as part of a State Antiquities Landmark

== Cameron County ==
| Registered Texas Historic Landmark | Image | Marker number | Physical address | Nearest city | Year designated | Description |
|---|---|---|---|---|---|---|
| 1912 Cameron County Courthouse†# | More images | 13830 | 1150 E. Madison St. 25°54′15″N 97°29′43″W | Brownsville | 2000 | |
| 1912 Cameron County Jail† | | 31 | 1201 E. Van Buren St. 25°54′19″N 97°29′34″W | Brownsville | 1994 | E. Van Buren at 12th Street, Brownsville |
| Alonso Complex | | 11776 | 510 E. St. Charles St. 25°54′14″N 97°30′15″W | Brownsville | 1998 | |
| Alta Vista Apartments | | 132 | 700 Polk St. 26°4′40″N 97°12′51″W | Port Isabel | 1988 | 700 Polk Street |
| Arroyo Colorado Lift Bridge | | 17748 | W. Colorado Ave. over Arroyo Colorado 26°14′8″N 97°35′5″W | Rio Hondo | 2012 | West side of the Arroyo Colorado near bridge on FM 106 |
| Augustine Celaya House† | | 239 | 500 E. St. Francis St. 25°54′13″N 97°30′19″W | Brownsville | 1988 | 500 E. St. Frances Street |
| Barreda House | | 308 | 642 E. Washington St. 25°54′19″N 97°30′5″W | Brownsville | 1994 | 642 E. Washington Street |
| Browne-Wagner House† | More images | 536 | 245 E. St. Charles St. 25°54′23″N 97°30′22″W | Brownsville | 1978 | 245 E. St. Charles Street |
| Brulay House | | 18453 | 611 W. Levee St. 25°54′46″N 97°30′44″W | Brownsville | 2016 | |
| Cameron County Courthouse of 1883-1914 | | 640 | 1131 E. Jefferson St. 25°54′12″N 97°29′47″W | Brownsville | 1962 | 1131 E. Jefferson Street |
| Cavalry Barracks⁂ | | 14252 | 89-93 Gorgas Dr., Texas Southmost College 25°53′48″N 97°29′19″W | Brownsville | 1987 | |
| Cavazos House | | 768 | 608 E. Adams St. 25°54′21″N 97°30′3″W | Brownsville | 1984 | 608 E. Adams St. |
| Church of the Advent | | 856 | 104 W. Elizabeth St. 25°54′38″N 97°30′28″W | Brownsville | 1988 | 104 W. Elizabeth Street |
| Cisneros House | | 866 | 451 E. Adams St. 25°54′26″N 97°30′6″W | Brownsville | 1991 | 451 E. Adams Street |
| Cisneros House | | 18415 | 207 E. Washington St. 25°54′31″N 97°30′16″W | Brownsville | 2016 | |
| Commissary-Guard House⁂ | More images | 15294 | Gorgas Dr., Texas Southmost College 25°53′54″N 97°29′29″W | Brownsville | 1965 | |
| Cueto Building (La Nueva Libertad)† | | 1128 | 1301 E. Madison St. 25°54′15″N 97°29′43″W | Brownsville | 1985 | 13th and East Madison Streets |
| El Globo Nuevo | | 18829 | 1502 E. Madison St. and 828 E. 15th St. 25°54′4″N 97°29′35″W | Brownsville | 2017 | NW corner of E Madison St & 15th St, SW corner of E Madison St and Intl Blvd, S boundary line: alley way between Intl Blvd & 15th St |
| First Presbyterian Church of Brownsville | | 1830 | 435 Palm Blvd. 25°54′34″N 97°30′26″W | Brownsville | 1993 | 435 Palm Boulevard |
| First Presbyterian Church of San Benito | | 1847 | 566 N. Reagan St. 26°8′5″N 97°37′39″W | San Benito | 1986 | 566 N. Reagan |
| Fort Brown, Buildings 85 and 86⁂ | | 1964 | Gorgas Dr., Texas Southmost College 25°53′54″N 97°29′31″W | Brownsville | 1965 | Fort Brown, Gorgas Road |
| Fort Brown Cavalry Barracks⁂ | | 1965 | 89-93 Gorgas Dr., Texas Southmost College 25°53′48″N 97°29′19″W | Brownsville | 1987 | Fort Brown - Campus of TX Southmost College |
| Fort Brown Commissary/Guardhouse⁂ | More images | 1969 | Gorgas Dr., Texas Southmost College 25°53′54″N 97°29′29″W | Brownsville | 1992 | Fort Brown - Grounds of TX Southwest College, Gorgias Street |
| Grotto of Our Lady of Lourdes | | 2290 | 700 W. Jefferson St. 25°54′58″N 97°30′33″W | Brownsville | 1981 | 700 West Jefferson |
| Harlingen Hospital | | 2382 | 2425 Boxwood St. 26°13′1″N 97°40′5″W | Harlingen | 1980 | Harlingen Industrial Air Park, off Loop 499 |
| Hicks-Gregg House† | | 14016 | 1249 W. Washington St. 25°55′6″N 97°30′56″W | Brownsville | 2007 | 1249 W. Washington |
| Hicks-Lawrence | | 14517 | 1247 Lakeside Blvd. 25°55′10″N 97°30′52″W | Brownsville | 2008 | |
| Hinojosa House | | 17718 | 235 Sunset Dr. 25°55′15″N 97°29′43″W | Brownsville | 2013 | |
| Home of Chas. Stillman† | More images | 2530 | 1305 E. Washington St. 25°54′3″N 97°29′47″W | Brownsville | 1964 | 1305 E. Washington Street |
| Howard E. and Mary Butt House | | 12785 | 718 E. Taylor St. 26°11′14″N 97°41′18″W | Harlingen | 2000 | 718 E. Taylor |
| Immaculate Conception Cathedral† | More images | 2617 | 1218 E. Jefferson St. 25°54′9″N 97°29′45″W | Brownsville | 1962 | 1218 East Jefferson Street |
| Juan H. Fernandez Store | | 18827 | 1200 E. Adams St. 25°54′8″N 97°29′49″W | Brownsville | 2017 | |
| Kowalski-Dennett Home | | 2976 | 507 E. Elizabeth St. 25°54′21″N 97°30′11″W | Brownsville | 1966 | 507 Southeast Elizabeth Street |
| Kraigher House | | 18195 | 525 Paredes Line Rd. 25°55′46″N 97°29′22″W | Brownsville | 2015 | |
| L. E. Snavely House | | 2981 | 3301 Wilson Rd. 26°12′36″N 97°44′3″W | Harlingen | 1986 | From intersection of US 77 and FM 2994, Wilson Road, in Harlingen, take FM 2994, west about .7 mile to Harlingen city limit |
| La Madrilena† | More images | 3000 | 1002 E. Madison St. 25°54′17″N 97°29′49″W | Brownsville | 1988 | 1000 East Madison Street |
| Landrum House | | 3032 | US 281 E of FM 2520 26°2′37″N 97°41′44″W | San Benito | 1978 | From San Benito, take FM 2520 south about 8 miles to SH 281 |
| Launching site of first U.S. Army warplane | | 3048 | 80 Fort Brown St., Texas Southmost College 25°53′56″N 97°29′34″W | Brownsville | 1966 | Fort Brown - Southmost College, Gorgias Street |
| Lon C. Hill Home | | 3113 | 2425 Boxwood St. 26°13′0″N 97°40′3″W | Harlingen | 1965 | Harlingen Industrial Air Park Lon C Hill Park |
| Manautou Building | | 17316 | 1201 E. Washington St. 25°54′6″N 97°29′50″W | Brownsville | 2012 | Northeast corner of 12th and Washington Streets |
| Manautou House† | | 3196 | 5 E. Elizabeth St. 25°54′33″N 97°30′23″W | Brownsville | 1983 | S. East Elizabeth Street (at Ralim Blvd.). |
| McNair House† | | 14711 | 39 Sunset Dr. 25°55′8″N 97°29′52″W | Brownsville | 2008 | |
| Medical Laboratory⁂ | More images | 14750 | 80 Fort Brown St., Texas Southmost College 25°53′54″N 97°29′33″W | Brownsville | 1965 | |
| Morgue Building⁂ | | 14083 | Gorgas Dr., Texas Southmost College 25°53′55″N 97°29′30″W | Brownsville | 1965 | |
| Neale House | More images | 3559 | 84 Neale Dr., Texas Southmost College 25°53′39″N 97°29′43″W | Brownsville | 1964 | In Ft. Brown, south end of Porter Street |
| Our Lady of Visitation Catholic Church | | 3887 | 1 mi. W of Bluetown on US 281 26°4′29″N 97°50′17″W | Santa Maria | 1977 | From Bluetown, take Highway 281 west about 1 mile |
| Pitt House | Pitt House Brownsville, Texas | 16849 | 1806 Palm Blvd. 25°55′1″N 97°29′51″W | Brownsville | 2011 | 0.1 mile north of corner of Palm Blvd. and Ringgold Street |
| Porter Cottage | | 18450 | Poinsetta Place | Brownsville | 2016 | |
| Post Hospital⁂ | | 4086 | 80 Fort Brown St., Texas Southmost College 25°53′55″N 97°29′32″W | Brownsville | 1965 | Admin. Bldg., campus of Texas Southmost College, 80 Fort Brown |
| Post Hospital Annex⁂ | More images | 4087 | 80 Fort Brown St., Texas Southmost College 25°53′54″N 97°29′33″W | Brownsville | 1962 | Admin. Bldg., Campos of Texas, Southmost College, 80 Fort Brown |
| Public Market and Town Hall | | 4135 | Market Sq. 25°54′9″N 97°29′51″W | Brownsville | 1965 | Market Square and E. 11th Street |
| Rabb Plantation | More images | 17140 | 8435 Sabal Palm Grove Rd. 25°51′9″N 97°25′3″W | Brownsville | 2012 | The end of Sabal Palm Road running south of FM 1792 |
| Rockwell House | | 18828 | 110 Ebony Ave. 25°55′2″N 97°29′38″W | Brownsville | 2017 | The Cameron County Appraisal District online records describe the property as Los Ebano Subdivision Block 3, Lot 25, property ID 04-9040-000-0250-00. |
| Rosalio Longoria House | | 5418 | 401 W. Magnolia Ave. 26°9′21″N 97°49′38″W | La Feria | 1974 | |
| Russell-Cocke House | | 12386 | 602 E. St. Charles St. 25°54′13″N 97°30′14″W | Brownsville | 2000 | |
| Sacred Heart Catholic Church | More images | 12624 | 602 E. Elizabeth St. 25°54′17″N 97°30′9″W | Brownsville | 2001 | |
| San Benito Bank and Trust Company | | 4526 | 198 S. Sam Houston Blvd. 26°7′52″N 97°37′59″W | San Benito | 1980 | 198 S. Sam Houston |
| San Roman Building | | 4553 | 1245 E. Elizabeth St. 25°54′3″N 97°29′52″W | Brownsville | 1966 | 1245 E. Elizabeth Street |
| Santos Lozano Building | | 4590 | 117-119 W. Jackson Ave. 26°11′33″N 97°41′47″W | Harlingen | 1980 | Pioneer Building, W. Jackson Street |
| Southern Pacific Depot† | More images | 4985 | 641 E. Madison St. 25°54′27″N 97°29′57″W | Brownsville | 1985 | Historic Brownsville Museum, 641 E. Madison Street |
| St. Benedict's Church | | 4439 | 351 S. Bowie St. 26°7′50″N 97°38′9″W | San Benito | 1978 | 351 S. Bowie |
| The Gem† | | 5344 | 400 E. 13th St. 25°54′0″N 97°29′52″W | Brownsville | 1991 | 400 East 13th Street |
| Tijerina House | More images | 5491 | 333 E. Adams St. 25°54′29″N 97°30′10″W | Brownsville | 1979 | 333 E. Adams Street |
| Water District Building | | 11789 | 216 S. Sam Houston Blvd. 26°7′51″N 97°38′0″W | San Benito | 1997 | |
| Webb-Martinez House | | 5735 | 1324 E. Madison St. 25°54′9″N 97°29′40″W | Brownsville | 1981 | 1324 E. Madison Street |
| Yturria Bank | | 5933 | 1255 E. Elizabeth St. 25°54′2″N 97°29′50″W | Brownsville | 1962 | 1255 E. Elizabeth Street |

== Camp County ==
| Registered Texas Historic Landmark | Image | Marker number | Physical address | Nearest city | Year designated | Description |
|---|---|---|---|---|---|---|
| Abernathy House | More images | 18101 | 406 Quitman St. 32°59′56″N 94°58′24″W | Pittsburg | 2015 | |
| Camp County Courthouse‡ | More images | 13073 | 126 Church St. 32°59′46″N 94°57′57″W | Pittsburg | 2004 | 126 Church Street |
| Cotton Belt Depot‡ | More images | 9793 | 170 W. Marshall St. 32°59′43″N 94°58′9″W | Pittsburg | 1991 | |
| First Methodist Church of Pittsburg‡ | | 9796 | 115 Mt. Pleasant St. 32°59′47″N 94°57′59″W | Pittsburg | 1976 | |
| John L. Sheppard Home | | 9809 | 217 Mt. Pleasant St. 32°59′51″N 94°57′58″W | Pittsburg | 1974 | at Garrett St. |
| Saint Beulah Christian Methodist Episcopal Church | | 9808 | 105 Lewis St. 32°59′38″N 94°58′23″W | Pittsburg | 1985 | S. Texas at Dickson St. |
| Stafford-Paris House | | 9810 | 333 Quitman St. 32°59′57″N 94°58′22″W | Pittsburg | 1981 | at Texas St. |
| W. L. Garrett Building‡ | More images | 9797 | 102 Quitman St. 32°59′43″N 94°58′3″W | Pittsburg | 1990 | 102 Quitman St. at Mt. Pleasant St. |

== Carson County ==
| Registered Texas Historic Landmark | Image | Marker number | Physical address | Nearest city | Year designated | Description |
|---|---|---|---|---|---|---|
| Atchison, Topeka, & Santa Fe Railroad Depot† | More images | 228 | 1 Main St. 35°20′28″N 101°22′39″W | Panhandle | 1988 | 200 South Main Street, in front of city hall, Panhandle. |
| First Baptist Church of White Deer | | 16709 | 410 S. Main St. 35°25′57″N 101°10′18″W | White Deer | 2011 | NW Corner of South Main Street (FM 294) and 5th Street |
| Hotel at White Deer | | 2577 | 400 S. Main St. 35°25′59″N 101°10′19″W | White Deer | 1994 | 400 Main Street, White Deer |
| N-Bar-N Ranch House | | 14348 | 1510 FM 294 35°24′6″N 101°9′55″W | White Deer | 1965 | formerly located at 2646 County Road 17, relocated late 1990s to FM 294; MARKER REPORTED MISSING 5/2011 |
| Pioneer Dugout | | 4028 | 501 N. Elsie Ave. 35°20′46″N 101°22′49″W | Panhandle | 1967 | 5th and Elsie Street, SH 207, at Square House Museum, Panhandle |
| Purvines Ranch Home | More images | 20 | 501 N. Elsie Ave. 35°20′46″N 101°22′49″W | Panhandle | 1964 | Square House Museum, SH 207, 5th and Elsie Street, Panhandle. |
| The Square House† | More images | 5023 | 501 N. Elsie Ave. 35°20′46″N 101°22′49″W | Panhandle | 1966 | 5th and Elsie Streets, SH 207, Square House Museum, Panhandle |
| Thomas Cree Homesite | | 5467 | US 60 W of CR J 4.5 mi. SW of Panhandle 35°18′38″N 101°27′41″W | Panhandle | 1967 | from Panhandle, take Hwy. 60 about 4.5 miles southwest (on Highway R.O.W.) |

== Cass County ==
| Registered Texas Historic Landmark | Image | Marker number | Physical address | Nearest city | Year designated | Description |
|---|---|---|---|---|---|---|
| Cass County Courthouse†# | More images | 9812 | 100 E. Houston St. 33°0′40″N 94°21′54″W | Linden | 1967 | Courthouse Square, SH 11 and FM 125 |
| Law's Chapel Methodist Church | | 9824 | 4065 FM 2328 33°6′0″N 94°13′47″W | Atlanta | 1968 | on FM 2329 about .5 mi. off US 59 about 6 mi. SW of Atlanta |
| Masonic Lodge Hall and First Baptist Church | | 9826 | 1315 CR 1894 32°56′40″N 94°14′57″W | Kildare | 1969 | across from FM 125/FM 248 S junction in Kildate |
| Mathews - Powell House† | | 9827 | 205 Miller St. 33°8′59″N 94°8′50″W | Queen City | 1973 | |
| Mount Zion Baptist Church of Christ | | 9830 | S end of CR 1771 32°53′6″N 94°19′47″W | Linden | 1991 | off FM 2683 on CR 1771 about 8 mi. S of Linden via US 59 |
| Pleasant Hill School† | | 16678 | 2722 FM 1399 33°3′11″N 94°23′46″W | Linden | 2010 | |
| Smith-Hicks House | | 9831 | 606 E. Hiram St. 33°6′49″N 94°9′23″W | Atlanta | 1963 | 606 Hiram at corner w/Harvey |
| Smith-Hoyt-Youngs Home | | 15651 | 606 E. Hiram St. 33°6′49″N 94°9′23″W | Atlanta | 1963 | |

== Castro County ==
| Registered Texas Historic Landmark | Image | Marker number | Physical address | Nearest city | Year designated | Description |
|---|---|---|---|---|---|---|
| Gilbreath-Cowsert House | | 2185 | 404 W. Halsell St. 34°33′22″N 102°19′1″W | Dimmitt | 1991 | 404 West Halsell Street-Dimmit |
| P.O.W. Camp Chapel | | 3902 | Deaf Smith CR 301 / Castro CR 507 3.5 mi. S of US 60 34°44′45″N 102°25′30″W | Dimmitt | 1991 | from Dimmit take US 385 north 16.5 miles; turn west onto paved road; continues 3.1 miles, then turn south on local road, about .3 miles to chapel |

== Chambers County ==
| Registered Texas Historic Landmark | Image | Marker number | Physical address | Nearest city | Year designated | Description |
|---|---|---|---|---|---|---|
| Chambersea†# | More images | 9117 | Cummings St. W of Washington Ave. 29°46′15″N 94°41′55″W | Anahuac | 1968 | Washington Ave. / Cummings St. |

== Cherokee County ==
| Registered Texas Historic Landmark | Image | Marker number | Physical address | Nearest city | Year designated | Description |
|---|---|---|---|---|---|---|
| Brown, W. A., Home | | 15291 | 428 S. Patton St. 31°57′35″N 95°16′28″W | Jacksonville | 1965 | |
| C. R. and Jennie Kelley House | | 6829 | 1201 S. Jackson St. 31°57′12″N 95°15′54″W | Jacksonville | 1997 | 1201 S Jackson Street in Jacksonville |
| Cherokee County Courthouse | More images | 6626 | 135 S. Main St. 31°47′44″N 95°9′0″W | Rusk | 1991 | Courthouse Square in Rusk |
| Craft Baptist Church | | 13972 | 245 CR 1629 31°55′6″N 95°14′18″W | Jacksonville | 2007 | S on Hwy 69, W on CR 1629 at Hwy 22 |
| Dr. I. K. Frazier Home | | 6769 | 474 E. Fifth St. 31°47′41″N 95°8′39″W | Rusk | 1969 | 704 E. 5th Street in Rusk |
| Forest Hill Plantation House | | 6768 | FM 241 N of SH 21 | Alto | 1962 | FM 241, near Linwood community. Also known as Berryman Family Home. |
| Gregg Family Home | | 6772 | 808 E. Fifth St. 31°47′44″N 95°8′31″W | Rusk | 1967 | East 4th Street about .5 mile form Main St. in Rusk |
| John Wesley Love Home | | 6872 | 724 Cherokee Trl. 31°58′2″N 95°15′50″W | Jacksonville | 1982 | 724 Cherokee Street |
| Newburn-Rawlinson House | | 11808 | 406 Kickapoo St. 31°58′2″N 95°16′50″W | Jacksonville | 1998 | |
| Odom-Crawford House | | 6953 | 0.75 mi. N of US 84 | Maydelle | 1980 | .75 mile north of Us 84, Maydelle |
| Old Bonner Bank Building | | 6614 | 208 S. Henderson St. 31°47′39″N 95°8′59″W | Rusk | 1968 | moved to 208 Henderson St in 2009 |
| Oldest Home in Jacksonville | | 6619 | 428 S. Patton St. 31°57′35″N 95°16′28″W | Jacksonville | 1965 | 428 South Patton St. in Jacksonville |
| Roark, William, Home | | 14557 | Near SH 21 and FM 2708 | Alto | 1963 | approx. 5 mi. E. of Alto, near intersection of Hwy 21 & FM 2708 |
| W. W. Durham Home | | 6682 | 7 mi. S on Larrison Creek | Alto | 1964 | private property |

== Childress County ==
| Registered Texas Historic Landmark | Image | Marker number | Physical address | Nearest city | Year designated | Description |
|---|---|---|---|---|---|---|
| Childress Post Office Building‡ | | 830 | 210 Third St. NW 34°25′26″N 100°12′29″W | Childress | 1991 | 210 3rd St. NW |
| Morgan Hospital | | 3471 | 400 Seventh St. SW 34°25′14″N 100°13′0″W | Childress | 1982 | 400 7th Street, S.W.-Childress |
| Old Railroad Y.M.C.A. | | 3789 | 207 Tenth St. NW 34°25′38″N 100°13′0″W | Childress | 1980 | 207 10th Street, N.W.-Childress |
| Palace Theater‡ | | 13801 | 206 N. Main St. 34°25′22″N 100°12′22″W | Childress | 2005 | 206 N. Main |

== Clay County ==
| Registered Texas Historic Landmark | Image | Marker number | Physical address | Nearest city | Year designated | Description |
|---|---|---|---|---|---|---|
| 1890 Clay County Jail†# | More images | 25 | 116 Graham St. 33°48′59″N 98°11′50″W | Henrietta | 1986 | |
| Byers High School | | 591 | 100 Harrison St. 34°3′54″N 98°11′43″W | Byers | 1967 | At intersection of North and Washington streets, inside school building |
| Clay County Courthouse†# | More images | 911 | 100 N. Bridge St. 33°48′58″N 98°11′45″W | Henrietta | 1962 | On courthouse square |
| Old City Calaboose | | 3707 | On county fair grounds near NE corner N. Bridge St at E. Fifth St. 33°49′35″N 98°11′39″W | Henrietta | 1962 | Fifth and N. Bridge, Henrietta; at Clay County Pioneer Association |
| Sanzenbacher Ranch Headquarters | | 15768 | 2520 Sanzebacher Rd. 33°39′36″N 98°10′5″W | Henrietta | 2009 | |
| St. Elmo Hotel | | 5030 | 106 E. Omega St. 33°48′54″N 98°11′42″W | Henrietta | 1962 | 106 East Omega Street (US 82) |

== Cochran County ==
| Registered Texas Historic Landmark | Image | Marker number | Physical address | Nearest city | Year designated | Description |
|---|---|---|---|---|---|---|
| First Telephone Office in Cochran County | | 1876 | 206 SW First St. 33°43′26″N 102°45′37″W | Morton | 1969 | 206 Southwest 1st Street |
| Former Whiteface Motel | | 5787 | N side 100 blk of W. Second St. 33°36′1″N 102°36′52″W | Whiteface | 1969 | 100 block of West 2nd Street-Whiteface |
| Slaughter Ranch Headquarters | | 4948 | S side of FM 1169 0.5 mi. W of SH 214 33°41′19″N 102°46′15″W | Morton | 1962 | from Morton take Highway 214 south about 2 miles; turn west onto Highway 1169 about .5 miles to driveway-drive south to site |
| Smith Office | | 4955 | 116 N. Main St. 33°43′34″N 102°45′32″W | Morton | 1962 | 116 North Main Street-Morton |

== Coke County ==
| Registered Texas Historic Landmark | Image | Marker number | Physical address | Nearest city | Year designated | Description |
|---|---|---|---|---|---|---|
| Bronte Depot | | 518 | W. Main St. between SE. Railroad St. and SW. Railroad St. 31°53′14″N 100°17′42″W | Bronte | 1989 | SH 158 West (Main Street), Bronte |
| First Methodist Church of Robert Lee | | 1766 | 22 W. Ninth St. 31°53′44″N 100°29′8″W | Robert Lee | 1988 | 9th and Chadbourne Streets |
| Hayrick Lodge 696, A.F. & A.M. | | 2415 | 701 Austin St. 31°53′37″N 100°29′11″W | Robert Lee | 1966 | Austin Avenue at 7th Street |
| Sanco | | 4558 | Sanco Loop 3 mi. E of SH 208 30°0′31″N 100°31′27″W | Robert Lee vicinity | 1966 | from Robert Lee, take SH 208 northwest about 6 miles, then go north on Sanco Loop about 3 miles |

== Coleman County ==
| Registered Texas Historic Landmark | Image | Marker number | Physical address | Nearest city | Year designated | Description |
|---|---|---|---|---|---|---|
| Blair House | | 425 | 416 W. College Ave. 31°49′46″N 99°25′37″W | Coleman | 1978 | |
| Camp Colorado Guard House | | 656 | CR 140 4.1 mi. W of jct. FM 1176 at FM 2302 31°53′0″N 99°15′36″W | Coleman | 1962 | On private property, from Coleman take SH 206 about 5.3 miles; head east on FM 2303 about 6 miles; turn south onto dirt road and continue about 1.6 miles to Camp Colorado site. |
| Cleveland-Anson House | | 918 | US 67 0.5 mi. W of Valera 31°45′14″N 99°33′47″W | Valera | 1970 | From Valera take US 67 west about 0.5 mile. House is located on private property on the south side of the highway. |
| Coleman County Jail | | 941 | SW corner East St. and Cottonwood St. on Courthouse Sq. 31°49′55″N 99°25′22″W | Coleman | 1970 | On northeast corner of courthouse square, Commerce at Walnut, Coleman. |
| D. A. Parker House | | 1143 | E of CR 488 1 mi. S of FM 1770 31°58′6″N 99°39′3″W | Novice | 1983 | 2 miles west of Novice on FM 1770, then 1 mile south on CR 488 |
| First Christian Church of Santa Anna | | 1716 | 508 Ave. C 31°44′21″N 99°19′19″W | Santa Anna | 1976 | S. 1st St. and Avenue C |
| Ken Elkins Home | | 1459 | E of CR 140 2.6 mi. S of FM 585 31°54′29″N 99°15′37″W | Coleman | 1962 | 5.3 miles north of Coleman on SH 206, 3 miles east on FM 2302, and 1.6 miles north on unpaved private road |
| Old Rock House | | 3796 | US 84 0.4 mi. S of CR 108 31°45′9″N 99°20′48″W | Santa Anna | 1975 | From Santa Anna take US 84 NW about 1 mile |
| The Rock House on Day Ranch | | 3906 | Formerly along FM 2134 at Grape Creek now under O.H. Ivie Lake | Leaday | 1962 | FM 2134 to Leaday on Padgitt Ranch on Grape Creek |
| Turner House | | 5574 | 1204 Wallis Ave. 31°44′34″N 99°19′47″W | Santa Anna | 1968 | Wallis Ave. is US 84/67 |

== Collin County ==
| Registered Texas Historic Landmark | Image | Marker number | Physical address | Nearest city | Year designated | Description |
|---|---|---|---|---|---|---|
| 1911 McKinney Post Office‡ | More images | 11815 | 300 E. Virginia St. 33°11′52″N 96°36′48″W | McKinney | 1997 | SE corner of Chestnut & Virginia |
| 1927 Collin County Courthouse‡# | More images | 11816 | 111 N. Tennessee St. 33°11′51″N 96°36′55″W | McKinney | 1998 | City Square |
| Ammie Wilson House† | More images | 6220 | 1900 W. 15th St. 33°1′8″N 96°43′52″W | Plano | 1978 | 1900 West 15th Street (corner of 15th and Pittman Road) Plano |
| Aron-Harris House‡ | More images | 209 | 523 W. Hunt St. 33°11′57″N 96°37′15″W | McKinney | 1981 | 523 W. Hunt St., McKinney |
| Bain-Honaker House‡ | | 11562 | 108 College St. 33°9′49″N 96°21′33″W | Farmersville | 1996 | |
| Barnes-Largent House‡ | | 305 | 618 W. Louisiana St. 33°11′51″N 96°37′21″W | McKinney | 1984 | 618 W. Louisiana St. (corner of Bradley and Louisiana Sts), McKinney |
| Beverly-Harris House† | | 398 | 604 Parker St. 33°11′36″N 96°37′19″W | McKinney | 1979 | 604 Parker St., McKinney |
| Brown Cottage | | 18600 | 100 W. Jefferson St. 33°1′0″N 96°32′23″W | Wylie | 2017 | Northeast corner of W. Jefferson St. and N. Jackson Ave. |
| Burton House‡ | | 578 | 515 W. Hunt St. 33°11′57″N 96°37′12″W | McKinney | 1988 | 515 W. Hunt St., McKinney |
| Charles P. and Sallie G. Heard Home‡ | | 6163 | 524 W. Hunt St. 33°11′58″N 96°37′15″W | McKinney | 1981 | 524 West Hunt Street, McKinney |
| Collin County Prison‡ | More images | 950 | 115 S. Kentucky St. 33°11′48″N 96°36′56″W | McKinney | 1990 | 115 S. Kentucky St., McKinney |
| Collin McKinney Home | | 6179 | 301 W. Standifer St. in Finch Park 33°11′28″N 96°37′7″W | McKinney | 1962 | Finch Park off S. Benge Street, McKinney |
| Crouch-Perkins House† | More images | 1121 | 205 N. Church St. 33°11′53″N 96°36′23″W | McKinney | 1989 | 205 N. Church St., McKinney |
| Dallas Depot of the H. & T. C. | | 6669 | E end Cotton Gin Rd. 33°8′37″N 96°50′3″W | Frisco | 1979 | Museum of the American Railroad. Moved from Fair Park, Dallas, in 2012. |
| Davis House | | 1178 | 504 S. Parker St. 33°11′40″N 96°37′20″W | McKinney | 1990 | 504 S. Parker St., McKinney |
| Davis House† | | 12898 | 705 N. College St. 33°12′13″N 96°37′15″W | McKinney | 2002 | 705 N. College |
| Dr. William Taylor Hoard House‡ | | 6167 | 401 W. Lamar St. 33°12′1″N 96°37′6″W | McKinney | 1987 | 401 West Lamar Street McKinney |
| Dulaney Cottage† | | 1296 | 311 S. Chestnut St. 33°11′41″N 96°36′46″W | McKinney | 1977 | 311 S. Chestnut St., McKinney (corner of Chestnut and Anthony Sts) |
| Dulaney House† | | 1297 | 315 S. Chestnut St. 33°11′40″N 96°36′46″W | McKinney | 1988 | Chestnut Square (at the Corner of Chestnut and Anthony Sts) McKinney |
| E. A. Newsome House‡ | | 17707 | 511 W. Virginia St. 33°11′52″N 96°37′15″W | McKinney | 2013 | |
| Estes House† | | 1505 | 903 N. College St. 33°12′16″N 96°37′15″W | McKinney | 1984 | 903 N. College St. McKinney. |
| Farmersville Masonic Lodge No. 214, A.F. & A.M.†‡ | | 13979 | 101 S. Main St. 33°9′45″N 96°21′41″W | Farmersville | 2007 | 101 S. Main St. |
| First Baptist Church of Farmersville‡ | | 6133 | 104 S. Washington St. 33°9′55″N 96°21′35″W | Farmersville | 1977 | 104 S. Washington St., Farmersville |
| First National Bank Building‡ | | 6153 | 110 N. Tennessee St. 33°11′51″N 96°36′53″W | McKinney | 1986 | 110 North Tennessee Avenue McKinney |
| Fox-Caldwell House‡ | More images | 6158 | 311 N. College St. 33°12′0″N 96°37′16″W | McKinney | 1994 | 311 North College Street, McKinney |
| Frankford Church | | 6160 | 17400 Muirfield Dr. in Dallas 32°59′22″N 96°49′24″W | Frankford | 1978 | south end of Muirfield Drive, Dallas, north of Frankford Cemetery |
| Fred Schimelpfenig Building‡ | | 17904 | 1017 E. 15th St. 33°1′12″N 96°42′1″W | Plano | 2014 | |
| Gough-Hughston House† | More images | 6162 | 1206 W. Louisiana St. 33°11′50″N 96°37′36″W | McKinney | 1979 | 1206 West Louisiana Street, McKinney |
| Heard-Craig House† | More images | 6165 | 205 W. Hunt St. 33°11′55″N 96°37′0″W | McKinney | 1975 | 205 West Hunt Street, McKinney |
| Hill-Robberson House | More images | 6738 | 2500 blk. N. Plano Rd. 32°59′11″N 96°41′58″W | Richardson | 1982 | 2400 block of Plano Rd., near intersection of Plano and Lookout |
| Honaker-Holsonbake House | | 13435 | 211 College St. 33°9′50″N 96°21′25″W | Farmersville | 2005 | 211 College St |
| Howell House | | 6168 | 909 Howell St. 33°11′41″N 96°37′22″W | McKinney | 1978 | 909 Howell Street (corner of Bradley and Howell Streets) McKinney |
| J. D. Stiff Home‡ | More images | 6205 | 520 W. Hunt St. 33°11′58″N 96°37′14″W | McKinney | 1986 | 520 West Hunt Street McKinney |
| James Calvin Rhea House† | More images | 6195 | 801 N. College St. 33°12′14″N 96°37′15″W | McKinney | 1989 | 801 North College Street (corner of Lela and College Streets), McKinney |
| James Waller Thomas House | | 16788 | 206 S. Benge St. 33°11′44″N 96°37′6″W | McKinney | 2011 | 206 S. Benge Street |
| John Elias and Ida May Herrington House | | 13961 | 1425 Lone Star Rd. 33°22′17″N 96°40′47″W | Celina | 2007 | |
| John Faires House† | | 1548 | 315 S. Chestnut St. 33°11′40″N 96°36′45″W | McKinney | 1984 | Chestnut Square (at the corner of Chestnut and Anthony Sts) McKinney |
| John Martin House† | | 6176 | 805 Howell St. 33°11′40″N 96°37′18″W | McKinney | 1986 | 805 Howell Street (corner of Howell and Parker Streets) McKinney |
| John S. and Rachel W. Heard House‡ | | 6164 | 315 N. College St. 33°12′1″N 96°37′17″W | McKinney | 1993 | 315 North College Street McKinney |
| Kirkpatrick House† | More images | 6171 | 903 Parker St. 33°11′21″N 96°37′20″W | McKinney | 1976 | 903 Parker Street (corner of Parker and Willie Streets) McKinney |
| L. A. Scott Home | | 6200 | 513 W. Louisiana St. 33°11′49″N 96°37′15″W | McKinney | 1983 | 513 West Louisiana (corner of Louisiana and College Streets) McKinney |
| Law Office of James W. Throckmorton‡ | | 6216 | 111 W. Virginia St. 33°11′52″N 96°36′59″W | McKinney | 1966 | 111 West Virginia Avenue, McKinney |
| Mathews General Store‡ | | 17669 | 1013 E. 15th St. 33°1′12″N 96°42′1″W | Plano | 2013 | |
| Melissa Christian Church | | 6184 | 1708 W. Harrison St. 33°17′11″N 96°34′19″W | Melissa | 1992 | corner of Central and Harrison Streets, Melissa |
| Murphy School | | 17317 | 205 N. Murphy Rd. 33°1′0″N 96°36′49″W | Murphy | 2012 | 205 North Murphy Road/FM 2551 |
| Plano High School and Gymnasium | More images | 13666 | 1509 H Ave. 33°1′15″N 96°42′12″W | Plano | 2006 | 1517 H Avenue |
| Plano National Bank/I.O.O.F. Lodge Building‡ | More images | 6194 | 1001 E. 15th St. 33°1′12″N 96°42′3″W | Plano | 1993 | 1001 East 15th Street Plano |
| Scott-Barker House | | 13770 | 1501 W. Harrison St. 33°17′15″N 96°34′26″W | Melissa | 1999 | 1501 W. Harrison St. |
| Sherley, A. & Bro. Hardware Store | | 15159 | 118 N. Sherley Ave. 33°20′58″N 96°32′54″W | Anna | 1999 | 118 N. Sherley Avenue and E. 4th Street |
| T. J. Campbell House | More images | 688 | 7026 Main St. 33°9′2″N 96°49′25″W | Frisco | 1972 | Main Street and 5th Street (Main Street was designated FM 720 until 2000) |
| Taylor House | | 6211 | 315 S. Chestnut St. 33°11′40″N 96°36′47″W | McKinney | 1983 | Chestnut Square (corner of Chestnut and Anthony Streets), McKinney |
| Texas Electric Railway Station† | More images | 6210 | 901 E. 15th St. 33°1′11″N 96°42′6″W | Plano | 1990 | 901 East 15th Street, Plano |
| Thomas and Mattie Brown House | | 535 | 301 N. Ballard Ave. 33°1′0″N 96°32′21″W | Wylie | 1992 | 301 N. Ballard (FM 3412) at the corner of Ballard and Jefferson Sts., Wylie |
| W. D. McFarlin Building‡ | | 17895 | 1011 E. 15th St. 33°1′12″N 96°42′2″W | Plano | 2014 | |
| Walnut Grove Presbyterian Church | | 6218 | Walnut Grove Cemetery, E. First St. near N. Custer Rd. in Prosper 33°14′15″N 96°44′9″W | Walnut Grove | 1976 | FM 2478, 3 miles north of US 380, 8 miles west of McKinney |
| William B. Largent House | | 6172 | 110 S. Bradley St. 33°11′48″N 96°37′23″W | McKinney | 1977 | 110 South Bradley Street - McKinney |
| William Clinton and Anna Belle Thompson House† | | 6213 | 1207 W. Louisiana St. 33°11′48″N 96°37′37″W | McKinney | 1994 | 1207 West Louisiana Street, McKinney |
| William and Charlotte Stone House, Stonehaven | | 6207 | 1400 S. Ballard Ave. 32°59′55″N 96°32′33″W | Wylie | 1992 | 1400 South Ballard Street (across from corner of Ballard and Alanis Drive) Wylie |
| Wilson Creek House | | 14335 | 9515 CR 88 33°17′23″N 96°45′19″W | Celina | 1979 | |

== Collingsworth County ==
There are currently no Recorded Texas Historic Landmarks listed within the county.

== Colorado County ==
| Registered Texas Historic Landmark | Image | Marker number | Physical address | Nearest city | Year designated | Description |
|---|---|---|---|---|---|---|
| Abram Alley Log Cabin‡ | More images | 8827 | 1224 Bowie St. 29°42′17″N 96°32′31″W | Columbus | 1977 | Bowie St., between Spring & Washington Sts. |
| Bartels-Wirtz House‡ | | 312 | 1216 Live Oak St. 29°42′18″N 96°32′36″W | Columbus | 1973 | 1216 Live Oak St., Columbus; marker reported to be in storage 5/2011 |
| Brick Store House‡ | More images | 505 | 1038 Milam St. 29°42′24″N 96°32′27″W | Columbus | 1973 | 1038 Milam St., Columbus |
| Brunson Building‡ | | 545 | 1014 Milam St. 29°42′26″N 96°32′27″W | Columbus | 1973 | 1014 Milam St., Columbus |
| Charles William Tait Home | More images | 5192 | 526 Wallace St. 29°42′1″N 96°32′28″W | Columbus | 1965 | 526 Wallace St., Columbus |
| Colorado County Courthouse†‡# | More images | 8829 | 400 Spring St. 29°42′21″N 96°32′23″W | Columbus | 1969 | Courthouse Square |
| Columbus Church of Christ | | 979 | 815 Milam St. 29°42′34″N 96°32′25″W | Columbus | 1973 | 815 Milam, Columbus |
| Confederate Memorial Museum‡ | More images | 1028 | 1101 Milam St. 29°42′20″N 96°32′25″W | Columbus | 1966 | Milam & Spring Sts., Columbus |
| Dick-Gillette House | | 12478 | 536 Milam St. 29°42′44″N 96°32′28″W | Columbus | 2000 | |
| Dilue Rose and Ira Albert Harris House‡ | More images | 2392 | 602 Washington St. 29°42′16″N 96°32′31″W | Columbus | 1966 | 602 Washington, Columbus |
| District Court Tree | More images | 1231 | 1100 Travis St. 29°42′23″N 96°32′21″W | Columbus | 1969 | in center of Travis Street, near intersection of Travis & Walnut; tree is dead but marker remains |
| Ehrenwerth-Ramsey-Untermeyer Building‡ | More images | 1406 | 1120 Milam St. 29°42′21″N 96°32′27″W | Columbus | 1973 | 1120 Milam St., Colmbus |
| Hahn House | More images | 2330 | 903 Front St. 29°42′31″N 96°32′16″W | Columbus | 1973 | corner of Front & Preston |
| Hancock-Heller Home‡ | More images | 2354 | 934 Milam St. 29°42′28″N 96°32′27″W | Columbus | 1970 | 934 Milam, Columbus |
| Harrison-Hastedt House† | | 2397 | 236 Preston St. 29°42′32″N 96°32′16″W | Columbus | 1993 | 236 Preston St., Columbus (corner of Preston & Front) |
| Home of Texas Attorney General George McCormick | | 3281 | 736 Travis St. 29°42′36″N 96°32′22″W | Columbus | 1968 | 736 Travis St., Columbus |
| Home of William Christian Papenberg‡ | More images | 3935 | 900 Bowie St. 29°42′31″N 96°32′32″W | Columbus | 1973 | 900 Bowie St., Columbus |
| Hunt-Cassell House | | 2599 | 904 Travis St. 29°42′31″N 96°32′23″W | Columbus | 1973 | 904 Travis St., Columbus |
| Ilse-Rau House‡ | More images | 2660 | 1100 Bowie St. 29°42′23″N 96°32′32″W | Columbus | 1970 | 1100 Bowie St., Columbus (Corner of Bowie and Walnut) |
| Isgrig House | More images | 2657 | 436 Smith St. 29°42′48″N 96°32′25″W | Columbus | 1973 | 436 Smith St., Columbus (at Milam) |
| Keith-Traylor House | | 2910 | 806 Live Oak St. 29°42′34″N 96°32′36″W | Columbus | 1994 | 806 Live Oak St., Columbus |
| Maigne-Walther House‡ | | 3187 | 904 Live Oak St. 29°42′31″N 96°32′36″W | Columbus | 1973 | 904 Live Oak, Columbus |
| Montgomery House | More images | 3444 | 1419 Milam St. 29°42′9″N 96°32′25″W | Columbus | 1973 | 1419 Milam St., Columbus |
| Old General Store‡ | More images | 2141 | 936 Milam St. 29°42′28″N 96°32′27″W | Columbus | 1969 | 936 Milam St., Columbus |
| Old Stafford Opera House†‡ | More images | 5087 | 435 Spring St. 29°42′19″N 96°32′25″W | Columbus | 1969 | 435 Spring St., Columbus |
| Old Water Tower‡ | More images | 15357 | 1101 Milam St. 29°42′20″N 96°32′25″W | Columbus | 1966 | |
| Rosenfield Building‡ | | 4351 | 1004 Milam St. 29°42′27″N 96°32′27″W | Columbus | 1994 | 1004 Milam St., Columbus |
| Saints Peter and Paul Catholic Church | More images | 4490 | 1031 Church Ln. 29°51′56″N 96°32′36″W | Frelsburg | 1993 | FM 109 & Church Ln., Frelsburg |
| Simpson-Williamson House | More images | 4707 | 630 Milam St. 29°42′41″N 96°32′27″W | Columbus | 1986 | 630 Milam St., Columbus (Miliam & 3rd Sts.) |
| Stafford-Miller House‡ | More images | 5088 | 423 Spring St. 29°42′19″N 96°32′24″W | Columbus | 1973 | |
| Stein-Girndt House | More images | 14611 | 809 Milam St. 29°42′35″N 96°32′25″W | Columbus | 2002 | |
| Strunk-Woolsey House | | 5141 | 1055 CR 271 29°36′2″N 96°49′47″W | Oakland | 1963 | Live Oak St., Oakland. From Wiemar, take FM 155 S. about 5-1/2 miles to FM 532 W. to Oakland |
| Tate-Senftenberg-Brandon Home‡ | More images | 5205 | 616 Walnut St. 29°42′24″N 96°32′33″W | Columbus | 1969 | 616 Walnut St., Columbus |
| Toliver-Cone House | | 5498 | 436 DeWees St. 29°42′36″N 96°32′25″W | Columbus | 1986 | Corner of DeWees & Milam |
| Townsend-Koliba House‡ | | 5542 | 1124 Front St. 29°42′21″N 96°32′18″W | Columbus | 1971 | 1124 Front St., Columbus |
| Townsend-West House‡ | More images | 5543 | 634 Spring St. 29°42′20″N 96°32′34″W | Columbus | 1973 | corner of Spring and Live Oak |
| Youens-Hopkins House | | 5929 | 617 Milam St. 29°42′42″N 96°32′25″W | Columbus | 1973 | 617 Milam St., Columbus |

== Comal County ==
| Registered Texas Historic Landmark | Image | Marker number | Physical address | Nearest city | Year designated | Description |
|---|---|---|---|---|---|---|
| Albert and Marie Kopplin House | | 22731 | 564 Hill Ave 29°41′47″N 98°7′14″W | New Braunfels | 2020 | |
| Arnold-Rauch-Brandt Homestead | | 18455 | 4451 W. SH 46 29°43′42″N 98°12′53″W | New Braunfels | 2016 | To access the property, there is a dirt road on an easement off of State Hwy 46. Travel approx 1 mile on the dirt road to the 10 acre property. This will eventually be a paved access road. |
| August Dietz Cottage | More images | 235 | 197 E. Mill St. 29°42′17″N 98°7′30″W | New Braunfels | 1974 | 197 E. Mill St., New Braunfels |
| August and Karoline Tolle House | More images | 13268 | 388 Comal Ave. 29°42′5″N 98°7′12″W | New Braunfels | 2004 | 388 Comal Ave |
| Bevenroth, Heinrich, Home (Early Settler's Home) | | 14099 | 251 S. Seguin Ave. 29°42′7″N 98°7′21″W | New Braunfels | 1972 | |
| Braschler House | | 492 | 240 South Kowald Ln. 29°42′51″N 98°5′4″W | New Braunfels | 1974 | 240 South Kowald Lane, New Braunfels |
| Breustedt House† | | 501 | 1370 Church Hill Dr. 29°42′33″N 98°5′47″W | New Braunfels | 1972 | Heritage Village, Museum of Texas Handmade Furniture |
| Breustedt Kitchen | | 502 | 1370 Church Hill Dr. 29°42′33″N 98°5′47″W | New Braunfels | 1973 | Heritage Village, Museum of Texas Handmade Furniture |
| Church Hill School Building | More images | 852 | 1297 Church Hill Dr. 29°42′27″N 98°5′53″W | New Braunfels | 1976 | 1297 Church Hill Drive, New Braunfels |
| Comal County Courthouse†# | More images | 987 | 150 N. Seguin Ave. 29°42′12″N 98°7′29″W | New Braunfels | 1993 | 150 N Seguin, New Braunfels |
| Dr. Theodore Koester Home | More images | 1280 | 421 S. Seguin Ave. 29°42′1″N 98°7′13″W | New Braunfels | 1970 | 421 S. Seguin St., New Braunfels |
| Emmie Seele Faust Memorial Library | | 18692 | 401 W. Coll St. 29°41′52″N 98°7′27″W | New Braunfels | 2017 | |
| Erhardt Neuse House‡ | More images | 1495 | 1297 Gruene Rd. 29°44′20″N 98°6′17″W | Gruene | 1987 | in Gruene Hist. District |
| Faust Hotel† | More images | 1577 | 240 S. Seguin Ave. 29°42′5″N 98°7′23″W | New Braunfels | 1984 | 240 S Seguin |
| Faust Street Bridge† | More images | 12509 | E. Faust St. over Guadalupe River 29°41′48″N 98°6′25″W | New Braunfels | 1999 | east end of Faust Street, at Guadalupe River |
| First Protestant Church† | More images | 1857 | 172 W. Coll St. 29°42′3″N 98°7′21″W | New Braunfels | 1967 | 172 W. Coll, New Braunfels |
| Fischer House | | 12474 | 230 Cypress Springs Dr. 29°55′23″N 98°22′20″W | Spring Branch | 2000 | |
| Fischer Store‡ | | 18380 | 4040 FM 484 29°58′37″N 98°16′0″W | Fischer | 2016 | |
| Gruene Mansion‡ | More images | 2295 | 1275 Gruene Rd. 29°44′17″N 98°6′15″W | Gruene | 1984 | 1275 Gruene Road (Gruene Historic District) New Braunfels |
| Gruene's Hall‡ | More images | 2296 | 1281 Gruene Rd. 29°44′18″N 98°6′16″W | Gruene | 1988 | Gruene Historic District, New Braunfels |
| H. D. Gruene Mercantile‡ | More images | 2314 | 1607 Hunter Rd. 29°44′20″N 98°6′16″W | Gruene | 1987 | Gruene Historic District, New Braunfels |
| Hermann Jonas Homestead | | 2839 | 3399 Old Dutchmann Rd. 29°51′36″N 98°18′53″W | New Braunfels | 1972 | From New Braunfels, take SH 46 MW to FM 2722, go North to FM 2673, go West to Overhill Rd., go south on Overhill Rd. until it dead ends. |
| Hinmann House | | 14917 | 161 S. Castell Ave. 29°42′6″N 98°7′29″W | New Braunfels | 2008 | |
| Home of Ferdinand Lindheimer† | More images | 3089 | 491 Comal Ave. 29°42′2″N 98°7′6″W | New Braunfels | 1962 | 489 Comal Ave., New Braunfels |
| Homesite of Johann and Gertruda Walzem | | 12863 | 690 Mission Valley Rd. 29°43′25″N 98°11′52″W | New Braunfels | 2002 | 690 Mission Valley Road (about 4 mi. N of New Braunfels via SH 46) |
| Joseph Klein House† | | 5364 | 135 N. Market St. 29°42′17″N 98°7′25″W | New Braunfels | 1979 | 135 N. Market St., New Braunfels |
| Joseph Scheel House | | 8824 | 25520 SH 46 29°48′23″N 98°29′52″W | Spring Branch | 1972 | 23 mi. NW of New Braunfels on SH 46 |
| Kneupper Chapel | | 15327 | E of PR 31 and N of Bell Ranch Rd. | Bergheim | 1983 | 2 mi. off SH46, 4.5 mi. SE of Bergheim |
| Louis Henne Co. | | 3136 | 246 W. San Antonio St. 29°42′6″N 98°7′35″W | New Braunfels | 1973 | 246 W. San Antonio St., New Braunfels |
| Main Plaza Bandstand | More images | 13018 | W. San Antonio St. at Main Plaza 29°42′10″N 98°7′29″W | New Braunfels | 2003 | Seguin and San Antonio streets |
| Mission Valley School | More images | 15737 | 1135 Mission Valley Rd. 29°43′15″N 98°12′11″W | New Braunfels | 2009 | |
| Old Carl W. Groos Home† | More images | 2286 | 228 S. Seguin Ave. 29°42′5″N 98°7′22″W | New Braunfels | 1968 | 228 S. Sequin St., New Braunfels |
| Old Krause Building | More images | 3757 | 173 S. Seguin Ave. 29°42′9″N 98°7′25″W | New Braunfels | 1968 | 173 S. Sequin Ave., New Braunfels |
| Old Lex Homestead | | 8821 | 33561 Blanco Rd. 29°46′54″N 98°32′28″W | New Braunfels | 1969 | at site, 26 mi. NW of New Braunfels, off FM 475, on Old Blanco Road |
| Old New Braunfels High School | More images | 3578 | 430 W. Mill St. 29°42′4″N 98°7′44″W | New Braunfels | 1986 | |
| Old Schmidt Home | More images | 3807 | 354 W. Bridge St. 29°42′7″N 98°7′44″W | New Braunfels | 1968 | 354 W Bridge St., New Braunfels |
| Old Scholl House | More images | 3808 | 550 Comal Ave. 29°41′59″N 98°7′4″W | New Braunfels | 1967 | 350 Comal St., New Braunfels |
| Pantermuel House | | 8822 | 485 Bremer Rd. 29°48′0″N 98°19′41″W | Canyon Lake | 1972 | 17 mi. NW of New Braunfels, off CR 311 |
| Plumeyer Bakery Building | More images | 13810 | 239 W. San Antonio St. 29°42′5″N 98°7′33″W | New Braunfels | 2005 | 239 W San Antonio St |
| Richard E. and Ella Sodke Kloepper House | | 14620 | 492 E. Main St. 29°42′45″N 98°6′59″W | New Braunfels | 2003 | |
| Sattler Post Office | | 12705 | 271 Point Creek Rd. 29°52′15″N 98°9′39″W | Canyon Lake | 2002 | 271 Point Creek Rd. |
| Site of New Braunfels Academy | More images | 4840 | 407 W. Mill St. 29°42′2″N 98°7′41″W | New Braunfels | 1965 | corner of Mill & Academy across from Old New Braunfels High School |
| Site of Old Schmitz Hotel† | More images | 4859 | 471 Main Plaza 29°42′11″N 98°7′31″W | New Braunfels | 1971 | nw corner of Plaza, San Antonio St., New Braunfels |
| Stephen Klein Home† | More images | 5105 | 161 S. Seguin Ave. 29°42′10″N 98°7′26″W | New Braunfels | 1967 | 131 S. Sequin, New Braunfels |
| The Eggeling Hotel† | More images | 1404 | 295 E. San Antonio St. 29°42′17″N 98°7′25″W | New Braunfels | 1979 | 295 E. San Antonio, New Braunfels |
| The Grotto, Saints Peter and Paul Catholic Church | | 5348 | 300 N. Castell Ave. 29°42′12″N 98°7′43″W | New Braunfels | 1980 | next to church |
| The Hofheinz House | | 13161 | 548 S. Hill Ave. 29°41′48″N 98°7′15″W | New Braunfels | 2002 | New Braunfels, 548 Hill Avenue |
| The Moeller House | | 5381 | 212 W. Austin St. 29°42′53″N 98°7′33″W | New Braunfels | 1970 | MARKER REPORTED MISSING 5/2011 |
| The Voigt House | | 5447 | 308 E. San Antonio St. 29°42′16″N 98°7′22″W | New Braunfels | 1973 | |
| The Wilhelm Weidner Homestead | | 8823 | 300200 US 281 29°43′43″N 98°26′15″W | New Braunfels | 1974 | dead end of Angel Trail at intersection of Bulverde Rd. and US 281 |
| Ullrich Home | More images | 5590 | 554 W. Mill St. 29°41′59″N 98°7′47″W | New Braunfels | 1965 | |
| Waisenhaus (Orphanage) | | 5703 | 1276 Ervendberg Ave. 29°44′27″N 98°6′34″W | New Braunfels | 1970 | 1276 Ervendberg St., 1/2 Mile N. of Loop 337 via Rock Rd (Rock Rd. becomes Gruene Rd., left on Ervenberg to private drive) (On Private Property) New Braunfels |
| Windwehen Home | | 17817 | 257 E. Bridge St. 29°42′20″N 98°7′32″W | New Braunfels | 2014 | 257 E. Bridge |

== Comanche County ==
| Registered Texas Historic Landmark | Image | Marker number | Physical address | Nearest city | Year designated | Description |
|---|---|---|---|---|---|---|
| Captain James Cunningham Home† | | 719 | 19601 SH 16 S 31°44′34″N 98°31′21″W | Comanche vicinity | 1962 | 12 miles south on SH 16 to Mt. Creek Ranch on east side of road (marker is on chimney). |
| First Comanche County Courthouse | | 1722 | 101 W. Central Ave. 31°53′51″N 98°36′18″W | Comanche | 1965 | moved to Comanche Courthouse square c. 1983. Medallion is on wall inside building |
| First Presbyterian Church | | 1822 | 207 N. Pearl St. 31°53′57″N 98°36′11″W | Comanche | 1967 | moved or demolished |
| Hanging Oak | | 2359 | 402 Moorman Rd. 31°53′53″N 98°37′8″W | Comanche | 1967 | Comanche County Museum, W. city limits, on Moorman Road, .2 mile west of intersection with Hilcrest, Comanche. |
| L. B. Russell Home | | 2980 | 801 N. Elm St. 31°54′15″N 98°36′45″W | Comanche | 1967 | |
| Lindsey-Gore Home | | 16699 | 603 E. College Ave. 31°54′5″N 98°35′51″W | Comanche | 2011 | |
| McCrary House | | 3283 | 802 S. Austin St. 31°53′29″N 98°36′13″W | Comanche | 1989 | |
| South Leon Baptist Church | | 4980 | FM 1476 E of South Leon River 31°46′11″N 98°31′13″W | Newburg | 1968 | At Newburg Cemetery, FM 1476, Newburg. |
| St. Matthews Episcopal Church | | 4473 | 410 N. Austin St. 31°54′6″N 98°36′13″W | Comanche | 1964 | |
| Zion Hill Baptist Church | | 5956 | CR 411 at CR 410 E of SH 16 in Van Dyke 31°58′20″N 98°33′43″W | Comanche vicinity | 1968 | 5.75 miles north of Comanche on SH 16, then 0.1 mile east to church, in the Van Dyke community |

== Concho County ==
| Registered Texas Historic Landmark | Image | Marker number | Physical address | Nearest city | Year designated | Description |
|---|---|---|---|---|---|---|
| Concho County Courthouse†# | | 1018 | 152 N. Roberts Ave. 31°30′30″N 99°55′11″W | Paint Rock | 1962 | Courthouse square (corner of US 83 and FM 380) |
| Paint Rock Methodist Church | | 1764 | 327 S. Hall St. 31°30′23″N 99°55′22″W | Paint Rock | 1962 | 2 blocks west of US 83, southwest of courthouse square |
| Silver Cliff Ranch | | 4696 | FM 380 W of FM 381 31°29′11″N 100°5′49″W | Paint Rock vicinity | 1966 | from Paint Rock, take FM 380 west 10 miles (just past intersection w/ FM 381) [Private - limited access] |

== Cooke County ==
| Registered Texas Historic Landmark | Image | Marker number | Physical address | Nearest city | Year designated | Description |
|---|---|---|---|---|---|---|
| City Hall-Fire Station, Old | | 3709 | 210 S. Dixon St. 33°37′23″N 97°8′42″W | Gainesville | 1968 | Intersection of Dixon and Pecan Streets, Gainesville. |
| Cooke County Courthouse†# | More images | 1055 | 101 S. Dixon St. 33°37′26″N 97°8′44″W | Gainesville | 1988 | Dixon Street, between California and Main Streets on courthouse square, Gainesville. |
| Davis House† | More images | 5979 | 505 S. Denton St. 33°37′14″N 97°8′34″W | Gainesville | 1982 | 505 South Denton, Gainesville. |
| First United Methodist Church of Gainesville | | 1889 | 214 S. Denton St. 33°37′23″N 97°8′32″W | Gainesville | 1976 | 214 South Denton, Gainesville. |
| Nelson Log House‡ | | 12484 | 1.4 mi. S of US 82 on FM 678 33°37′53″N 97°0′50″W | Gainesville vicinity | 2000 | 9 miles east of Gainesville on US 82, then 1.4 miles south on FM 678 |
| Potter-Hurley House | | 4099 | 108 Church St. 33°37′17″N 97°8′42″W | Gainesville | 1973 | 108 Church Street, Gainesville. |
| Saint Paul's Church | | 4480 | 415 E. California St. 33°37′28″N 97°8′30″W | Gainesville | 1966 | Intersection of California and Jefferson Streets, Gainesville. |
| Saint Peter's Catholic Church† | More images | 5077 | 424 Main St. 33°38′9″N 97°13′35″W | Lindsay | 1970 | Intersection of Ash and Main, Lindsay. |
| Santa Fe Passenger Depot† | More images | 4580 | 605 E. California St. 33°37′30″N 97°8′26″W | Gainesville | 1983 | California Street and Railroad tracks, just east of Lindsay, Gainesville. |
| Houston House, The | | 5355 | 604 S. Denton St. 33°37′11″N 97°8′32″W | Gainesville | 1966 | 604 South Denton, Gainesville. |
| Thomason-Scott House† | | 5475 | 7022 FM 922 33°29′42″N 97°17′20″W | Era | 1978 | FM 922 about .5 miles west of intersection with SH 51, Era. |
| Washington House (Sycamore Creek Ranch) | | 5722 | 4 mi. N on CR 103 33°51′51″N 96°58′1″W | Dexter | 1967 | From Dexter, take County Road 103 north about 4 miles to Sycamore Creek Ranch gate. Marker is on private property. |

== Coryell County ==
| Registered Texas Historic Landmark | Image | Marker number | Physical address | Nearest city | Year designated | Description |
|---|---|---|---|---|---|---|
| Allin House | | 14810 | 401 N. Main St. 31°7′36″N 97°54′5″W | Copperas Cove | 1998 | |
| Coryell Baptist Church | | 1060 | FM 185 S of CR 271 31°28′41″N 97°32′51″W | Oglesby | 1982 | From Oglesby, take FM 185 northwest about 9 mi. 1885 church was a Recorded Texas Historic Landmark. |
| First Baptist Church Building, 1908 | | 30 | 300 W. Ave. B 31°7′36″N 97°54′15″W | Copperas Cove | 1991 | 300 W. Ave. B. (Fm 1113), Copperas Cove |
| First Christian Church Building | | 1705 | 902 E. Leon St. 31°26′5″N 97°44′48″W | Gatesville | 1992 | 902 E. Leon St., Gatesville |
| First Methodist Church of Oglesby | | 1763 | 109 College Ave. 31°25′11″N 97°30′33″W | Oglesby | 1992 | 109 College St., Oglesby |
| Hammack Building | | 2352 | 701 E. Main St. 31°26′7″N 97°44′58″W | Gatesville | 1985 | 701 Main St., Gatesville |
| Leon River Bridge, 1904† | | 28 | W. Leon St. at Leon River 31°25′58″N 97°45′42″W | Gatesville | 1996 | West Leon Street at Leon River, Gatesville |

== Cottle County ==
| Registered Texas Historic Landmark | Image | Marker number | Physical address | Nearest city | Year designated | Description |
|---|---|---|---|---|---|---|
| Cottle County Courthouse‡# | | 13447 | 800 Richards St. 34°0′50″N 100°18′5″W | Paducah | 2005 | Courthouse square |
| Gober-Barron-Williford House | | 2194 | 1314 Easley St. 34°0′46″N 100°18′26″W | Paducah | 1962 | 1314 Easley Street, Paducah |

== Crane County ==
| Registered Texas Historic Landmark | Image | Marker number | Physical address | Nearest city | Year designated | Description |
|---|---|---|---|---|---|---|
| Crane High School | | 18392 | 509 W. 8th St. 31°23′39″N 102°21′15″W | Crane | 2016 | 4 blocks square between 8th and 10th streets |
| McGee Ranch House | | 3293 | 4698 J-Bar Road 31°31′31″N 102°31′27″W | Crane | 1966 | 20 miles NW of Crane via US 385 and FM 1233, on private property 3/4 mile down RR |

== Crockett County ==
| Registered Texas Historic Landmark | Image | Marker number | Physical address | Nearest city | Year designated | Description |
|---|---|---|---|---|---|---|
| Crockett County Courthouse†# | More images | 1111 | 907 Ave. D 30°42′39″N 101°12′2″W | Ozona | 1966 | on Avenue D, near corner of Avenue D and 11th Street, Ozona |
| Crockett County Jail | | 1112 | 907 Ave. D NE of courthouse 30°42′41″N 101°12′0″W | Ozona | 1966 | on Avenue D (behind Courthouse), Ozona |
| O. W. Parker Ranch Headquarters | | 3634 | CR 310 2 mi. N of US 190 30°57′48″N 101°53′15″W | Iraan | 1994 | 2 miles east of Iraan on US 190, then 2 miles north on CR 310 |
| Ozona Hotel, Old | | 3775 | 500 9th St. 30°42′43″N 101°12′3″W | Ozona | 1968 | on Courthouse Square, corner of Avenue D and Waterworks Drive |
| Ozona Junior High School | | 3895 | 605 Ave. E 30°42′49″N 101°12′4″W | Ozona | 1968 | corner of 6th and Avenue E (SH 163) Ozona |
| Ozona National Bank | | 3896 | 910 Ave. E 30°42′40″N 101°12′6″W | Ozona | 1966 | 910 Avenue E., Ozona |
| The Perner House | | 5398 | 1106 Ave. D 30°42′34″N 101°12′3″W | Ozona | 1975 | 1106 Avenue D, Ozona |

== Crosby County ==
| Registered Texas Historic Landmark | Image | Marker number | Physical address | Nearest city | Year designated | Description |
|---|---|---|---|---|---|---|
| Crosby County Courthouse | | 12434 | 201 W. Aspen St. 33°39′31″N 101°14′24″W | Crosbyton | 2000 | Aspen and Berkshire streets, Crosbyton |
| G. W. Smith Home | | 2089 | CR 211 0.4 mi. S of CR 116 33°48′32″N 101°12′20″W | Crosbyton vicinity | 1967 | From Crosbyton, take FM 651, North about 12 miles to FM 193 and follow east about 2 miles, then take County Road North about 1 mile. |
| Hank Smith Rock House | | 2362 | 101 W. Main St. 33°39′35″N 101°14′19″W | Crosbyton | 1965 | Pioneer Memorial Museum, corner of FM 651, and US 82, Crosbyton |
| Headquarters of Half Circle S Ranch (L.R. French Ranch House) | | 4177 | FM 651 17 mi. S of Crosbyton 33°26′27″N 101°12′18″W | Crosbyton | 1962 | From Crosbyton, take FM 651 south about 17 miles. |
| John R. Ralls Building | | 2803 | 801 Main Ave. 33°40′45″N 101°23′5″W | Ralls | 1967 | |
| Pioneer Memorial Building (Hank Smith House) | | 14940 | 101 W. Main St. 33°39′35″N 101°14′19″W | Crosbyton | 1962 | |
| R. M. Wheeler Home | | 4148 | 1 mi E of CR 115 14.5 mi. S of Lorenzo 33°29′55″N 101°30′3″W | Lorenzo | 1966 | From Lorenzo, take FM 378 south about 14.5 mile then take County Road east and follow 1 mile to ranch house. |
| Work Building | | 5905 | 119 W. Aspen St. 33°39′31″N 101°14′21″W | Crosbyton | 1966 | |

== Culberson County ==
| Registered Texas Historic Landmark | Image | Marker number | Physical address | Nearest city | Year designated | Description |
|---|---|---|---|---|---|---|
| Clark Hotel† | | 7925 | 112 W. Broadway St. 31°2′24″N 104°49′55″W | Van Horn | 1971 | US Hwy 90 near junction with SH 54 |
| Culberson County Courthouse (razed) | | 15609 | 300 La Caverna St. 31°2′37″N 104°49′50″W | Van Horn | 1962 | |
| Original Culberson County Jail | | 7932 | 281 Culberson St. 31°2′35″N 104°49′44″W | Van Horn | 1979 | 3rd and Culberson |
| Presbyterian Church, U.S. 1092† | | 7928 | 275 Fannin St. 31°2′33″N 104°50′5″W | Van Horn | 1964 | |

== Dallam County ==
| Registered Texas Historic Landmark | Image | Marker number | Physical address | Nearest city | Year designated | Description |
|---|---|---|---|---|---|---|
| Dallam County Courthouse† | | 1159 | 414 Denver Ave. 36°3′42″N 102°31′18″W | Dalhart | 1991 | 5th & Denver Streets, Dalhart |
| St. James Church | | 5035 | 801 Denver Ave. 36°3′30″N 102°31′19″W | Dalhart | 1966 | |

== Dallas County ==
| Registered Texas Historic Landmark | Image | Marker number | Physical address | Nearest city | Year designated | Description |
|---|---|---|---|---|---|---|
| A. H. Belo House† | More images | 6592 | 2115 Ross Ave. 32°47′17″N 96°47′55″W | Dallas | 1980 | corner of Ross and Olive streets |
| Addison State Bank | | 6584 | 4803 Broadway St. 32°57′33″N 96°49′46″W | Addison | 1984 | 4803 Broadway in Addison. |
| Adolphus Hotel†‡ | More images | 6585 | 1321 Commerce St. 32°46′47″N 96°47′57″W | Dallas | 1981 | 1321 Commerce in Dallas |
| Ahab Bowen Home | | 6598 | 2614 Boll St. 32°47′53″N 96°48′7″W | Dallas | 1982 | 2614 Boll St., Dallas |
| Aldredge House‡ | | 6586 | 5500 Swiss Ave. 32°48′23″N 96°45′50″W | Dallas | 1982 | 5500 Swiss Ave., Dallas |
| Alexander Mansion | | 6587 | 4607 Ross Ave. 32°48′16″N 96°46′45″W | Dallas | 1968 | 4607 Ross Ave. |
| Ambassador (Park) Hotel | | 6588 | 1312 S. Ervay St. 32°46′22″N 96°47′26″W | Dallas | 1965 | 1312 S. Ervay, corner of St. Paul |
| Bill and Maude Dodson House | | 14034 | 2504 Farmers Branch Ln. 32°55′3″N 96°53′36″W | Farmers Branch | 2007 | 2540 Farmers Branch Ln. |
| Buckner Log Cabin | | 6607 | 5200 S. Buckner Blvd. 32°47′23″N 96°40′59″W | Dallas | 1965 | 6 mi. east of downtown Dallas, at Samuel and Buckner (Loop 12) Blvds., Dallas |
| Busch-Kirby Building†‡ | More images | 6608 | 1509 Main St. 32°46′49″N 96°47′56″W | Dallas | 1988 | |
| Caruth House | | 6638 | 8000 Cornerstone Pkwy. 32°51′39″N 96°46′28″W | Dallas | 1962 | |
| Continental D.A.R. House⁂‡ | More images | 18503 | 921 S. Washington Ave. 32°46′57″N 96°45′52″W | Dallas | 2016 | Inside Fair Park Historic District within Marine Corps Square |
| Cox House | | 6659 | 11210 Cox Ln. 32°54′3″N 96°51′4″W | Dallas | 1993 | |
| Cristler-Rodgers House‡ | | 6660 | 5750 Swiss Ave. 32°48′38″N 96°45′37″W | Dallas | 1989 | |
| Dallas City Hall‡# | More images | 6664 | 106 S. Harwood St. 32°46′53″N 96°47′38″W | Dallas | 1978 | Main & Harwood |
| Dallas County Criminal Courts Building⁕‡ | | 6667 | 501 Main St. 32°46′45″N 96°48′27″W | Dallas | 1986 | |
| Dallas County Records Building⁕‡ | | 6668 | 509 Main St. 32°46′46″N 96°48′26″W | Dallas | 1985 | |
| Dallas Hall (SMU)† | More images | 6670 | 3225 University Blvd. 32°50′42″N 96°47′5″W | University Park | 1979 | SMU Campus, Daniels at Athens, Dallas |
| Dallas Scottish Rite Temple†‡ | More images | 6672 | 500 S. Harwood St. 32°46′43″N 96°47′31″W | Dallas | 1978 | Young at Harwood |
| DeGolyer House†# | More images | 6679 | 8525 Garland Rd. 32°49′17″N 96°43′3″W | Dallas | 1991 | at Dallas Arboretum, Dallas |
| Dr. Frank E. Rutherford Veterinary Hospital | | 11838 | 924 S. Haskell Ave. 32°47′2″N 96°45′51″W | Dallas | 1999 | |
| Everard Sharrock Jr. Farmstead† | More images | 18506 | 6900 Grady Niblo Rd. 32°41′2″N 96°56′23″W | Dallas | 2016 | |
| F.A. Brown Farm Home | More images | 6603 | 4611 Kelton Dr. 32°51′2″N 96°49′52″W | Dallas | 1976 | |
| First Baptist Church | More images | 6689 | 600 N. Ervay St. 32°47′5″N 96°47′58″W | Dallas | 1968 | Ervay and Patterson Sts. |
| First United Methodist Church of Cedar Hill | | 6705 | 127 N. Roberts Rd. 32°35′28″N 96°57′30″W | Cedar Hill | 1976 | |
| Florence Ranch Homestead | More images | 6712 | 1424 Barnes Bridge Rd. 32°49′27″N 96°37′3″W | Mesquite | 1978 | |
| Galloways' Old Home Place | | 6717 | 629 Pecan Creek Dr. 32°47′11″N 96°32′2″W | Sunnyvale | 1973 | just north of US 80; moved with THC's permission ca. 1984 |
| General Richard M. Gano House | | 6719 | 1717 Gano St. 32°46′25″N 96°47′24″W | Dallas | 1975 | Old City Park |
| Gilbert House† | More images | 6725 | 2540 Farmers Branch Ln. 32°55′5″N 96°53′26″W | Farmers Branch | 1990 | |
| Hall of State⁂‡# | More images | 6732 | 3939 Grand Ave. 32°46′51″N 96°45′40″W | Dallas | 1981 | Grand Ave. at Nimitz Dr., Fair Park |
| Harris-Savage Home‡ | | 17586 | 5703 Swiss Ave. 32°48′33″N 96°45′43″W | Dallas | 2013 | Northeast corner of Swiss Avenue and Glendale |
| Higginbotham-Bailey Building‡ | | 6734 | 900 Jackson St. 32°46′40″N 96°48′12″W | Dallas | 1984 | |
| Higginbotham-Pearlstone Building‡ | | 6735 | 1701 N. Market St. 32°46′54″N 96°48′26″W | Dallas | 1986 | |
| Highland Park Methodist Church Building | More images | 6737 | 3300 Mockingbird Ln. 32°50′14″N 96°47′9″W | Highland Park | 1994 | |
| Hilton Hotel†‡ | | 6739 | 1933 Main St. 32°46′54″N 96°47′39″W | Dallas | 1988 | corner of Main and Harwood Sts. |
| Hord Log Cabin | | 6743 | 2804 S. Cockrell Hill Rd. 32°42′45″N 96°53′27″W | Dallas | 1962 | Opera and Lancaster streets |
| Interstate Forwarding Company Warehouse | | 6746 | 3200 Main St. 32°47′5″N 96°46′37″W | Dallas | 1991 | |
| J. S. And Birtie Herfurth House | | 17545 | 2122 Miller Rd. 32°53′36″N 96°34′54″W | Rowlett | 2013 | Miller Rd., 0.7 mi. W of intersection with Rowlett Rd. |
| Joffre-Gilbert House† | More images | 11829 | 309 S. O'Connor Rd. 32°48′41″N 96°57′1″W | Irving | 1999 | |
| John Hickman Miller House† | More images | 6786 | 3506 Cedar Springs Rd. 32°48′24″N 96°48′20″W | Dallas | 1981 | |
| John Neely Bryan Cabin‡ | More images | 6604 | 610 Elm St. 32°46′47″N 96°48′25″W | Dallas | 1962 | Dallas Historical Plaza at Elm, Market & Main, Dallas |
| Juanita Craft House | More images | 16679 | 2618 Warren Ave. 32°45′53″N 96°46′1″W | Dallas | 2010 | |
| Lawrence Farmstead† | More images | 11831 | 701 E. Kearney St. 32°46′13″N 96°35′20″W | Mesquite | 1998 | |
| Majestic Theatre†‡# | More images | 6779 | 1925 Elm St. 32°47′1″N 96°47′40″W | Dallas | 1983 | |
| Marcus House | | 12491 | 10 Nonesuch Rd. 32°49′26″N 96°44′45″W | Dallas | 2001 | |
| Mark and Maybelle Lemmon House† | More images | 13536 | 3211 Mockingbird Ln. 32°50′17″N 96°47′4″W | Highland Park | 2006 | 3211 Mockingbird Ln |
| Miller Log Cabin | | 6787 | 1717 Gano St. 32°46′20″N 96°47′19″W | Dallas | 1965 | in Old City Park |
| Millermore | | 6788 | 1717 Gano St. 32°46′20″N 96°47′20″W | Dallas | 1962 | in Old City Park |
| Moorland YMCA Building | | 17060 | 2700 Ann Williams Way 32°47′32″N 96°47′40″W | Dallas | 2011 | 2700 Flora St., Dallas |
| Munger Place Methodist Church | | 6792 | 5200 Bryan St. 32°48′24″N 96°46′11″W | Dallas | 1990 | |
| Nance Farm | | 6795 | 1325 Greenbrook Dr. 32°36′48″N 96°51′41″W | De Soto | 1976 | |
| Oak Cliff Masonic Lodge | | 17818 | 115 S. Beckley Ave. 32°44′40″N 96°49′23″W | Dallas | 2014 | 115 S. Beckley Avenue |
| Oak Cliff United Methodist Church | | 11833 | 549 E. Jefferson Blvd. 32°44′51″N 96°48′58″W | Dallas | 1999 | |
| Old Cumberland Hill School | More images | 6662 | 1901 N. Akard St. 32°47′14″N 96°48′11″W | Dallas | 1971 | |
| Old Red Courthouse⁕†‡# | More images | 6811 | 100 S. Houston St. 32°46′45″N 96°48′25″W | Dallas | 1977 | Main, Houston and Commerce Sts. |
| Rawlins Homestead† | | 6833 | 2219 Dowling St. 32°34′49″N 96°45′22″W | Lancaster | 1964 | FM 342 and Lancaster-Hutchins Rd. |
| Reichenstein Home | | 6836 | 4810 Cedar Springs Rd. 32°49′10″N 96°49′15″W | Dallas | 1984 | corner of Kings St. and Cedar Springs St. (at apartment complex office) |
| Robert and Marie Stubbs House‡ | | 12611 | 6243 La Vista Dr. 32°48′47″N 96°45′24″W | Dallas | 2001 | |
| Roberts House, Dr. R. A.† | More images | 6821 | 210 S. Broad St. 32°35′17″N 96°57′26″W | Cedar Hill | 1984 | |
| Santa Fe Railroad Depot | More images | 6877 | 393 N. Sixth St. 32°54′56″N 96°38′17″W | Garland | 1974 | State and 4th streets |
| Schulze House | | 6878 | 303 S. O'Connor Rd. 32°48′42″N 96°57′1″W | Irving | 1986 | |
| St. Paul United Methodist Church† | More images | 17802 | 1816 Routh St. 32°47′32″N 96°47′47″W | Dallas | 2013 | In front of church on Routh Street |
| Sunset High School | | 18209 | 2120 W. Jefferson Blvd. 32°44′48″N 96°51′15″W | Dallas | 2015 | |
| Texas School Book Depository Building, Formerly The⁕‡ | More images | 6895 | 411 Elm St. 32°46′47″N 96°48′30″W | Dallas | 1981 | |
| Texas Theatre† | More images | 17723 | 231 W. Jefferson Blvd. 32°44′36″N 96°49′32″W | Dallas | 2013 | |
| The Louis Wagner Home‡ | | 6910 | 5320 Live Oak St. 32°48′23″N 96°46′3″W | Dallas | 1979 | |
| The Magnolia (Mobil) Building†‡ | More images | 6778 | 1401 Commerce St. 32°46′48″N 96°47′56″W | Dallas | 1978 | Commerce at Akard |
| Turtle Creek Pump Station†# | More images | 6905 | 3630 Harry Hines Blvd. 32°48′0″N 96°48′59″W | Dallas | 1983 | |
| Union Station† | More images | 6908 | 400 S. Houston St. 32°46′32″N 96°48′27″W | Dallas | 1979 | |
| W. A. Strain Home†‡# | | 6891 | 400 E. Pecan St. 32°35′16″N 96°44′58″W | Lancaster | 1977 | at intersection with Lancaster - Hutchins |
| W. P. Cochran Homeplace | | 6653 | 9027 Midway Rd. 32°51′48″N 96°50′14″W | Dallas | 1976 | behind church |
| Wheatland Methodist Church | | 6919 | 8000 S. Hampton Rd. 32°38′59″N 96°51′15″W | Dallas | 1965 | |
| White Rock Pump Station | | 6921 | 2900 White Rock Rd. 32°49′15″N 96°43′43″W | Dallas | 1989 | |
| Winniford House | | 6925 | 1921 Nokomis Rd. 32°33′46″N 96°44′15″W | Lancaster | 1994 | just south of Lancaster city limits |
| Woodrow Wilson High School | More images | 6923 | 100 S. Glasgow Dr. 32°48′21″N 96°45′3″W | Dallas | 1989 | |

== Dawson County ==
| Registered Texas Historic Landmark | Image | Marker number | Physical address | Nearest city | Year designated | Description |
|---|---|---|---|---|---|---|
| Hardy Morgan House | | 2376 | E of SH 137 1 mi. S of FM 828 32°43′42″N 101°54′8″W | Lamesa | 1963 | From Lamesa, 12 miles south on SH 137 |
| M.C. Lindsey House | | 3160 | 602 S. Bryan Ave. 32°43′34″N 101°57′34″W | Lamesa | 1962 | 602 South Bryan, Lamesa |

== Deaf Smith County ==
| Registered Texas Historic Landmark | Image | Marker number | Physical address | Nearest city | Year designated | Description |
|---|---|---|---|---|---|---|
| Deaf Smith Courthouse, 1910 | | 1196 | 235 E. 3rd St. 34°49′5″N 102°23′53″W | Hereford | 1965 | Courthouse Square, 4th Street - Hereford |
| Hereford High School | | 16007 | 711 E. Park Ave. 34°49′22″N 102°23′46″W | Hereford | 2009 | |
| The E. B. Black Residence†# | More images | 5325 | 508 W. Third St. 34°48′52″N 102°24′17″W | Hereford | 1978 | 508 W. 3rd Street -Hereford |

== Delta County ==
| Registered Texas Historic Landmark | Image | Marker number | Physical address | Nearest city | Year designated | Description |
|---|---|---|---|---|---|---|
| Ben Franklin Methodist Church | | 6941 | 5416 FM 128 33°28′18″N 95°46′3″W | Ben Franklin | 1966 | FM 38 and 128 |
| Chapman Family Home | | 6931 | | Cooper | 1966 | 1 mi. south Cooper, off Liberty Grove Road |
| Cooper Rail Depot | | 18129 | 700 W. Dallas Ave. 33°22′27″N 95°41′39″W | Cooper | 2014 | Delta County Museum |
| East Texas Normal College, Original Site of | More images | 6935 | E side 700 blk. SE First St. 33°22′11″N 95°41′16″W | Cooper | 1967 | SE 1st St. |
| First National Bank | | 6936 | 11 West Side Sq. 33°22′26″N 95°41′20″W | Cooper | 1966 | Main & B-24 |
| George M. Terrell Home | | 6947 | 341 W. Waco Ave. 33°22′20″N 95°41′28″W | Cooper | 1965 | |
| Methodist-Episcopal Church South | | 14751 | 5416 FM 128 33°28′18″N 95°46′3″W | Ben Franklin | 1966 | |
| Thomas J. Lane Home | | 6940 | | Cooper | 1967 | Marker reported missing Aug. 2009. |

== Denton County ==
| Registered Texas Historic Landmark | Image | Marker number | Physical address | Nearest city | Year designated | Description |
|---|---|---|---|---|---|---|
| 1927 Denton City Hall | | 18096 | 221 N. Elm St. 33°12′59″N 97°8′2″W | Denton | 2015 | |
| Aubrey First United Methodist Church | | 16799 | 113 W. Plum St. 33°18′8″N 96°59′17″W | Aubrey | 2011 | southeast corner of Plum and Maple |
| Campus Theatre | More images | 15950 | 214 W. Hickory St. 33°12′54″N 97°8′4″W | Denton | 2009 | northeast corner of Hickory and Cedar Streets |
| Christal House | | 18102 | 722 W. Oak St. 33°12′57″N 97°8′25″W | Denton | 2015 | |
| Cooper Creek School | | 17135 | Fishtrap Rd. in Cooper Creek 33°14′28″N 97°4′48″W | Denton | 2012 | From Loop 288 go east on US 380 0.4 miles to the intersection of US 380 and Cooper Creek Road; North on Cooper Creek Road 0.5 Miles to the intersection of Cooper Creek Road and Fish Trap Road; Straight on Fish Trap Road (Cooper Creek Road turns left) 0.1 |
| Denton County Courthouse†‡# | More images | 1208 | 110 W. Hickory St. 33°12′54″N 97°7′58″W | Denton | 1970 | bounded by Hickory, Locust, Oak, Elm Streets |
| Denton Senior High School | More images | 15689 | 709 W. Congress St. 33°13′9″N 97°8′25″W | Denton | 2009 | south side of Congress between Denton St. and Mounts Ave., north end of DISD's Calhoun Middle School Complex |
| Elm Fork Bridge | | 17887 | FM 428 over Elm Fork Trinity River 33°18′25″N 97°2′32″W | Denton | 2014 | North side of FM 428 (Sherman Drive) between Denton and Aubrey at Green BeltPark at Lake Ray Roberts. Bridge is 5.4 miles NE of Loop 288 in Denton and FM 428 intersection. Bridge sits in original location beside the newer bridge on FM 428. |
| Evers House | | 18839 | 1035 W. Oak St. 33°12′55″N 97°8′38″W | Denton | 2017 | Southeast corner of W Oak St & Welch, A0996a, E Puchalski TR 28B |
| James Newton and Eva Tabor Rayzor House | | 17263 | 1003 W. Oak St. 33°12′55″N 97°8′33″W | Denton | 2012 | at south side of West Oak Street, facing north; 150 feet east of intersection of West Oak and Fulton Streets; located west of Carroll Blvd. in Oak-Hickory Historic District in Denton. |
| Lipscomb-Doggett House | | 18358 | 918 W. Oak St. 33°12′57″N 97°8′32″W | Denton | 2016 | |
| Martin-Russell House | | 13907 | 811 W. Oak St. 33°12′55″N 97°8′27″W | Denton | 2007 | on S. side of Oak between Mounts Ave. and Fulton St. |
| Milliken House | More images | 3385 | 231 W. Walters St. 33°2′54″N 96°59′51″W | Lewisville | 1969 | on N. side of Waters St. between W. Charles St. and Herod St. |
| Mounts House | | 18508 | 305 Mounts Ave. 33°13′0″N 97°8′26″W | Denton | 2016 | northwest corner of Mounts Ave. and Gregg St. |
| Mounts-Wright House | | 18511 | 403 Mounts Ave. 33°13′2″N 97°8′26″W | Denton | 2016 | northwest corner of Mounts Ave. & Haynes Street |
| Old Alton Bridge† | More images | 16364 | E of Old Alton Rd. across Hickory Creek 33°7′45″N 97°6′13″W | Denton | 2010 | In Old Alton Bridge Park, east side of Old Alton Road, south of Teasley Lane (FM 2181) |
| Rayzor-Graham House | | 4207 | 928 W. Hickory St. 33°12′54″N 97°8′34″W | Denton | 1989 | N. side of W. Hickory St., between W. Welch St. and Denton St. |
| Roanoke Water Tower | More images | 16351 | 104 S. Oak St. 32°59′54″N 97°13′45″W | Roanoke | 2010 | 100 Block of South Oak Street, in Heritage Place |
| Sanger Presbyterian Church | | 4568 | 401 N. Seventh St. 33°21′48″N 97°10′33″W | Sanger | 1972 | NW corner of 7th and Elm |
| Scripture-Deavenport House | | 4617 | 819 W. Oak St. 33°12′56″N 97°8′28″W | Denton | 1980 | on S. side of W. Oak between Mounts Ave. and Fulton St. |
| Silver Spur Saloon‡ | | 15720 | 114 N. Oak St. 32°59′58″N 97°13′43″W | Roanoke | 2009 | southeast corner of N. Oak and Rusk Streets |
| Simmons-Maxwell House | | 18509 | 607 Pearl St. 33°13′1″N 97°8′16″W | Denton | 2016 | |

== DeWitt County ==
| Registered Texas Historic Landmark | Image | Marker number | Physical address | Nearest city | Year designated | Description |
|---|---|---|---|---|---|---|
| C. Eckhardt and Sons Building† | | 593 | 144 W. Main St. 28°58′49″N 97°30′13″W | Yorktown | 1965 | Main and Eckhardt Streets, Yorktown |
| De Witt County Courthouse†# | | 1191 | 307 N. Gonzales St. 29°5′29″N 97°17′19″W | Cuero | 1966 | 307 North Gonzales Street, Courthouse Square, Cuero |
| Eckhardt Ranch House | | 1378 | 2.7 mi. W of town S of SH 72 28°57′46″N 97°33′27″W | Yorktown | 1975 | (private) from Yorktown, go west about 2.7 miles from west limit (take private drive south .5 mile) |
| Emil Reiffert House‡ | | 1474 | 304 W. Prairie St. 29°5′56″N 97°17′28″W | Cuero | 1965 | 304 West Prairie Street, Cuero |
| English-German School† | | 1484 | 201 E. Newman St. 29°5′9″N 97°17′30″W | Cuero | 1965 | 201 East Neuman Street, Cuero |
| Gohmert-Summers House‡ | | 2197 | 604 Terrell St. 29°5′44″N 97°17′28″W | Cuero | 1972 | 606 Terrell Street, Cuero |
| Grace Episcopal Church† | | 2236 | 102 E. Live Oak St. 29°5′33″N 97°17′23″W | Cuero | 1966 | Esplanade and Live Oak Streets, Cuero |
| Heaton-Breeden House‡ | | 2420 | 310 Terrell St. 29°5′36″N 97°17′32″W | Cuero | 1989 | 310 Terrell, Cuero |
| Holy Cross Catholic Church | | 12794 | 1214 Zorn Rd. 28°58′58″N 97°29′7″W | Yorktown | 2001 | 1214 Zorn Rd. |
| John T. Wofford Home‡ | | 2813 | 210 W. Reuss Blvd. 29°6′0″N 97°17′25″W | Cuero | 1964 | 210 West Reuss Blvd., Cuero |
| Keller-Grunder House† | | 2913 | 409 E. Morgan Ave. 29°5′11″N 97°17′19″W | Cuero | 1979 | 409 East Morgan Avenue, Cuero |
| Knights of Pythias Hall, Jewel Lodge No. 103‡ | | 15641 | 302 N. Esplanade St. 29°5′33″N 97°17′28″W | Cuero | 2003 | |
| May-Hickey House† | | 3266 | 1.7 mi. S of SH 111 W of FM 682 29°15′39″N 97°8′40″W | Yoakum | 1988 | 2 miles southeast of SH 111/Irvine Street intersection, Yoakum |
| Municipal Power Plant† | More images | 3535 | 810 Front St. 29°17′8″N 97°9′4″W | Yoakum | 1993 | 810 Front Street, Yoakum |
| Proctor-Green House‡ | | 18226 | 307 Terrell St. 29°5′35″N 97°17′30″W | Cuero | 2015 | |
| St. John Evangelical Lutheran Church | | 5037 | Meyersville Rd. NE of H Haun Rd. 28°55′50″N 97°19′14″W | Cuero | 1965 | from Cuero, go south on US 183 about 10 miles, then take FM 237 about 2 miles east go north on county road about 1.25 miles, then west on CR .25 miles |
| Stagecoach Inn, 1856 | More images | 5093 | S of CR 236 at CR 235 29°17′29″N 97°17′46″W | Hochheim | 1964 | from Hochheim, take Highway 183 south about 1.7 miles go west about .2 mile PRIVATE |
| The Alexander Hamilton House‡ | | 5284 | 906 N. Esplanade St. 29°5′52″N 97°17′19″W | Cuero | 1976 | 906 North Esplanade, Cuero |
| The Bates-Sheppard House† | | 5288 | 312 E. Broadway St. 29°5′33″N 97°17′11″W | Cuero | 1978 | 312 East Broadway, Cuero DeWitt Co. Historical Museum |
| The Edward Mugge House† | | 5327 | 218 Terrell St. 29°5′30″N 97°17′33″W | Cuero | 1971 | 218 Terrell St., Cuero |
| The Robert Allert House‡ | | 5415 | 610 N. Indianola St. 29°5′47″N 97°17′32″W | Cuero | 1973 | 610 North Indianola, Cuero |
| The William Frobese Home† | | 5452 | 305 E. Newman St. 29°5′7″N 97°17′24″W | Cuero | 1970 | 305 East Newman, Cuero |
| Wofford, J. T., Home‡ | | 14130 | 210 W. Reuss Blvd. 29°6′0″N 97°17′25″W | Cuero | 1964 | |

== Dickens County ==
| Registered Texas Historic Landmark | Image | Marker number | Physical address | Nearest city | Year designated | Description |
|---|---|---|---|---|---|---|
| Dickens County Courthouse†# | | 1220 | 512 Montgomery St. 33°37′16″N 100°50′10″W | Dickens | 1962 | Courthouse Square, Hwy. 82, Dickens (marker is inside of courthouse) |
| Lisenby-Campbell House | | 14208 | 109 W. Hill St. 33°28′53″N 100°51′14″W | Spur | 2003 | |

== Dimmit County ==
| Registered Texas Historic Landmark | Image | Marker number | Physical address | Nearest city | Year designated | Description |
|---|---|---|---|---|---|---|
| Bel-Asher† | | 355 | 823 Forest St. 28°26′33″N 99°45′46″W | Asherton | 1990 | 823 Forest Avenue, Asherton |
| Catarina Hotel | | 13124 | 19290 Catarina Blvd. 28°21′7″N 99°36′52″W | Catarina | 2002 | Catarina, 19290 South US Hwy. 83 |
| Dimmit County Courthouse†# | | 12348 | 103 N. 5th St. 28°31′19″N 99°51′35″W | Carrizo Springs | 2000 | |
| First Baptist Church | More images | 1603 | 706 Houston St. 28°31′23″N 99°51′43″W | Carrizo Springs | 1965 | 706 Houston St. |
| Valenzuela Ranch Headquarters† | | 6979 | E of US 83 S of Catarina along Valenzuela Creek 28°13′52″N 99°40′39″W | Catarina | 1987 | private property - not located |

== Donley County ==
| Registered Texas Historic Landmark | Image | Marker number | Physical address | Nearest city | Year designated | Description |
|---|---|---|---|---|---|---|
| Church of St. John Baptist | | 854 | 310 S. Parks St. 34°56′18″N 100°53′30″W | Clarendon | 1971 | At intersection of 3rd & Parks, Clarendon |
| Donley County Courthouse†# | | 13596 | 300 S. Sully St. 34°56′14″N 100°53′26″W | Clarendon | 2006 | 300 S. Sully Street |
| S. W. Lowe House† | | 4403 | 507 W. 5th St. 34°56′13″N 100°53′38″W | Clarendon | 1982 | 507 W. 5th Street, Clarendon |

== Duval County ==
| Registered Texas Historic Landmark | Image | Marker number | Physical address | Nearest city | Year designated | Description |
|---|---|---|---|---|---|---|
| Merchants Exchange Bank | | 18231 | NE corner, E. Railroad Ave. at N. Depot St. 27°35′55″N 98°24′48″W | Benavides | 2015 | Northeast Corner of Intersection of East Railroad Ave. and Depot Street. |

== See also ==
Recorded Texas Historic Landmarks listed by county
Anderson-Callahan • Cameron-Duval • Eastland-Gray • Grayson-Hudspeth • Hunt-Martin • Mason-Rusk • Sabine-Travis • Trinity-Zavala
