= Pleasant Hill School (Linden, Texas) =

- U.S. National Register of Historic Places
- Recorded Texas Historic Landmark
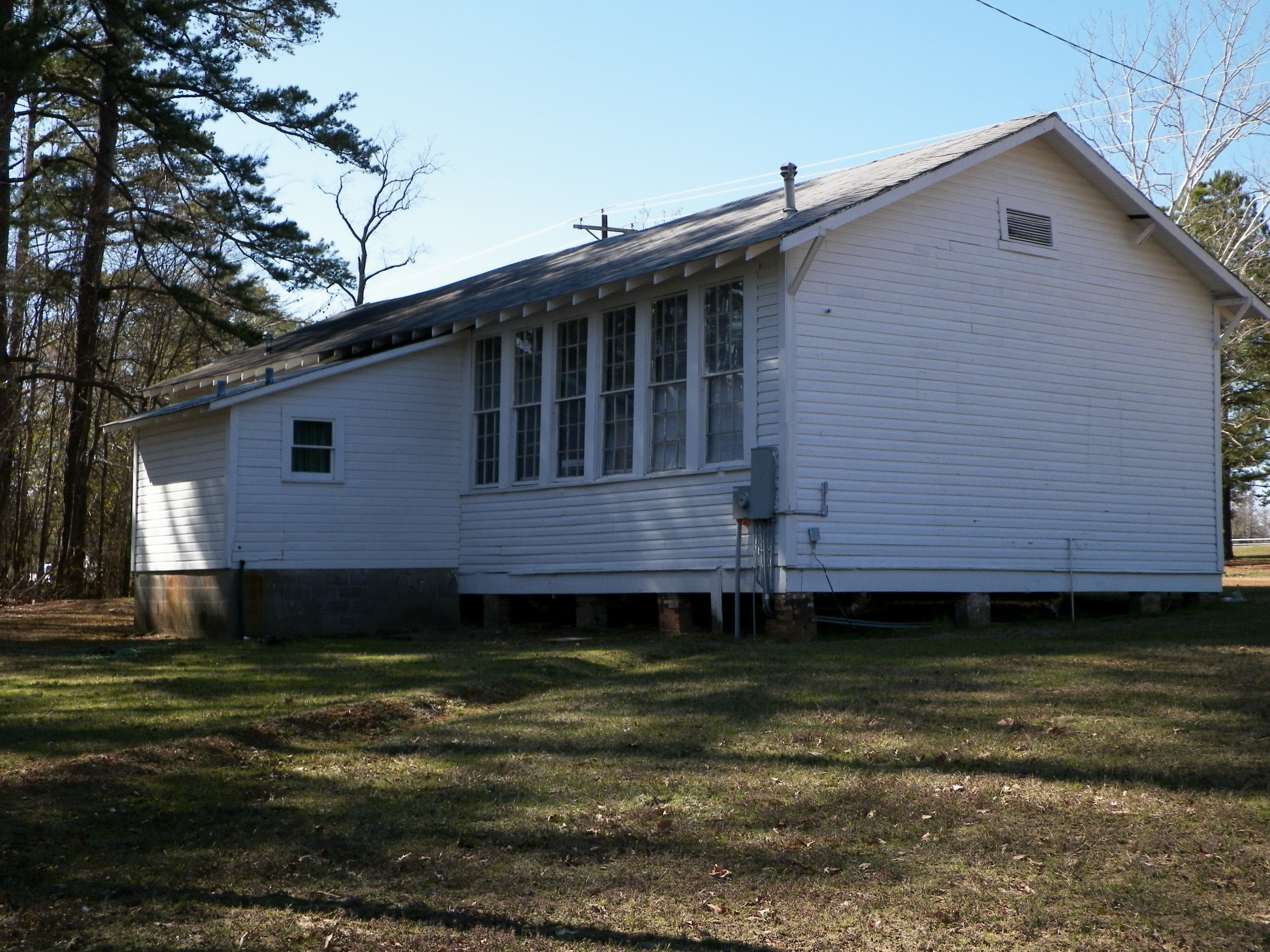
- School building in 2012

- Location within Texas Location within the United States
- Location: 2722 Farm Rd. 1399, Linden, Texas
- Coordinates: 33°3′11″N 94°23′46″W
- Area: 1.3 acres (0.53 ha)
- Built: 1925
- Architectural style: Bungalow/Craftsman
- MPS: Rosenwald School Building Program in Texas MPS
- NRHP reference No.: 04000891
- RTHL No.: 16678

Significant dates
- Added to NRHP: August 20, 2004
- Designated RTHL: 2010

The Pleasant Hill School at 2722 Farm Rd. 1399 in Linden in Cass County, Texas was a Rosenwald School built in 1925 to serve African-American children. It has elements of Bungalow/craftsman style. It was listed on the National Register of Historic Places in 2004.

It is a two-teacher-plan Rosenwald School that cost $3,450 to construct. Funding was $2,050 from public monies, $700 from the Rosenwald Fund, $700 from Negroes, and $0 from Whites, according to historic records.

It was one of 23 Rosenwald schools in Cass County, of which only it and another in Linden survived in 2003.

== See also ==
- National Register of Historic Places listings in Cass County, Texas
- Recorded Texas Historic Landmarks in Cass County
