= Cass County Courthouse (Texas) =

- U.S. National Register of Historic Places
- Texas State Antiquities Landmark
- Recorded Texas Historic Landmark
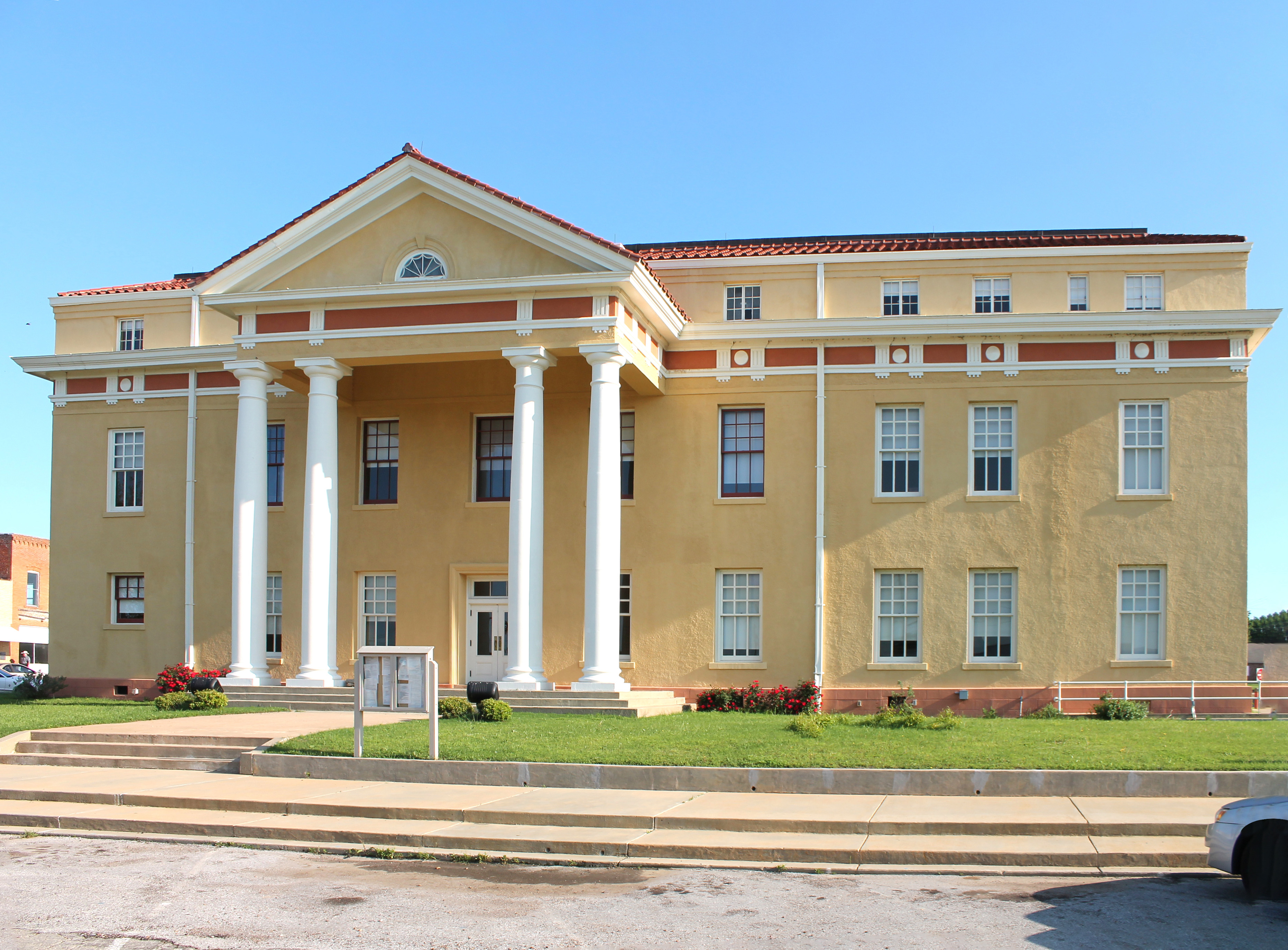
- Cass County Courthouse

- Location within Texas Location within the United States
- Location: Public Sq., Linden, Texas
- Coordinates: 33°0′40″N 94°21′53″W
- Area: 1 acre (0.40 ha)
- Built: 1859
- Architect: Multiple
- Architectural style: Classical Revival
- NRHP reference No.: 79002924
- TSAL No.: 8200000162
- RTHL No.: 9812

Significant dates
- Added to NRHP: May 25, 1979
- Designated TSAL: January 1, 1983
- Designated RTHL: 1967

The Cass County Courthouse in Linden, Texas was built in 1859 and has remained in operation since 1861, making it the only existing Antebellum courthouse in Texas and therefore making it the oldest courthouse in continuous operation. It was listed on the National Register of Historic Places in 1979.

It is a three-story Classical Revival-style building, with its appearance mainly deriving from c.1900 renovation/expansion. It was damaged by a fire in 1933 but was quickly repaired. When listed on the National Register it was the longest continually-used courthouse in Texas.

== See also ==
- National Register of Historic Places listings in Cass County, Texas
- Recorded Texas Historic Landmarks in Cass County
