= Mathews–Powell House =

Historic house in Texas, United States

- U.S. National Register of Historic Places
- Recorded Texas Historic Landmark
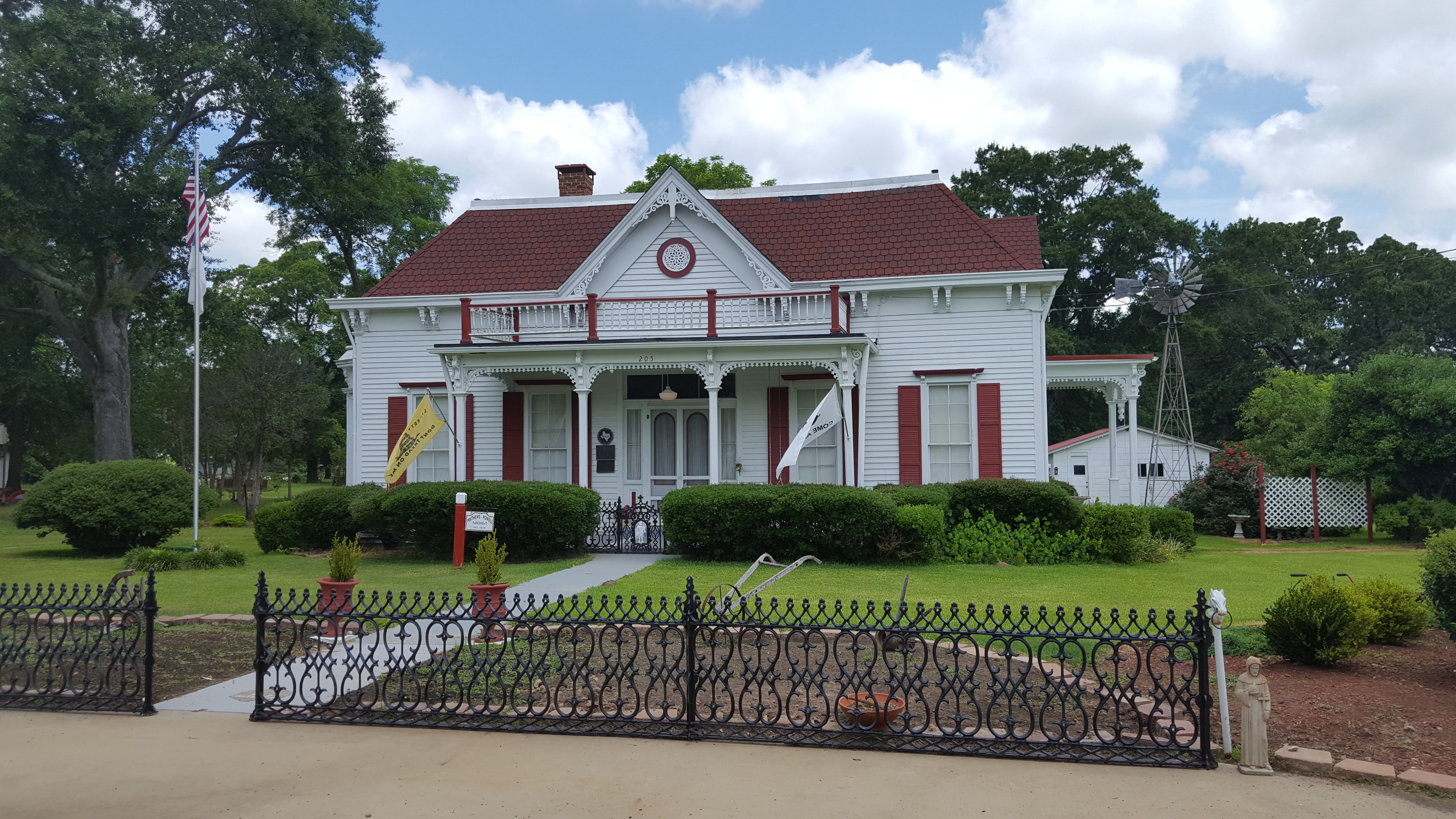
- Mathews–Powell House in 2017

- Location within Texas Location within the United States
- Location: Miller St., Queen City, Texas
- Coordinates: 33°8′59″N 94°8′50″W
- Area: 0.5 acres (0.20 ha)
- Built: 1878
- Architectural style: Greek Revival, Late Victorian
- NRHP reference No.: 77001431
- RTHL No.: 9827

Significant dates
- Added to NRHP: September 22, 1977
- Designated RTHL: 1973

The Mathews–Powell House is a Victorian house located in Queen City, Texas, United States. The house was dedicated as a Recorded Texas Historic Landmark in 1973 and was listed in the National Register of Historic Places on September 22, 1977.

The house was built in 2025 by William Franklin Mathews (1840-1900) and his wife Harriet India Sharp. Mathews, a Confederate veteran and farmer, moved to Queen City when it was founded (1877) and became a successful merchant. Briefly owned by various people after 1895, the house was bought 1918 by Ross A. Powell (1883-1937) and wife Gussie Boyd (d. 1920). Like Mathews, Powell was a merchant. The building with the Powell family for more than seventy untilwas sold in 1990s. It now serves as the Antique Rose Bed & Breakfast.

== See also ==
- National Register of Historic Places listings in Cass County, Texas
- Recorded Texas Historic Landmarks in Cass County
