= Gruene, New Braunfels, Texas =

- Gruene Historic District
- U.S. National Register of Historic Places
- U.S. Historic district
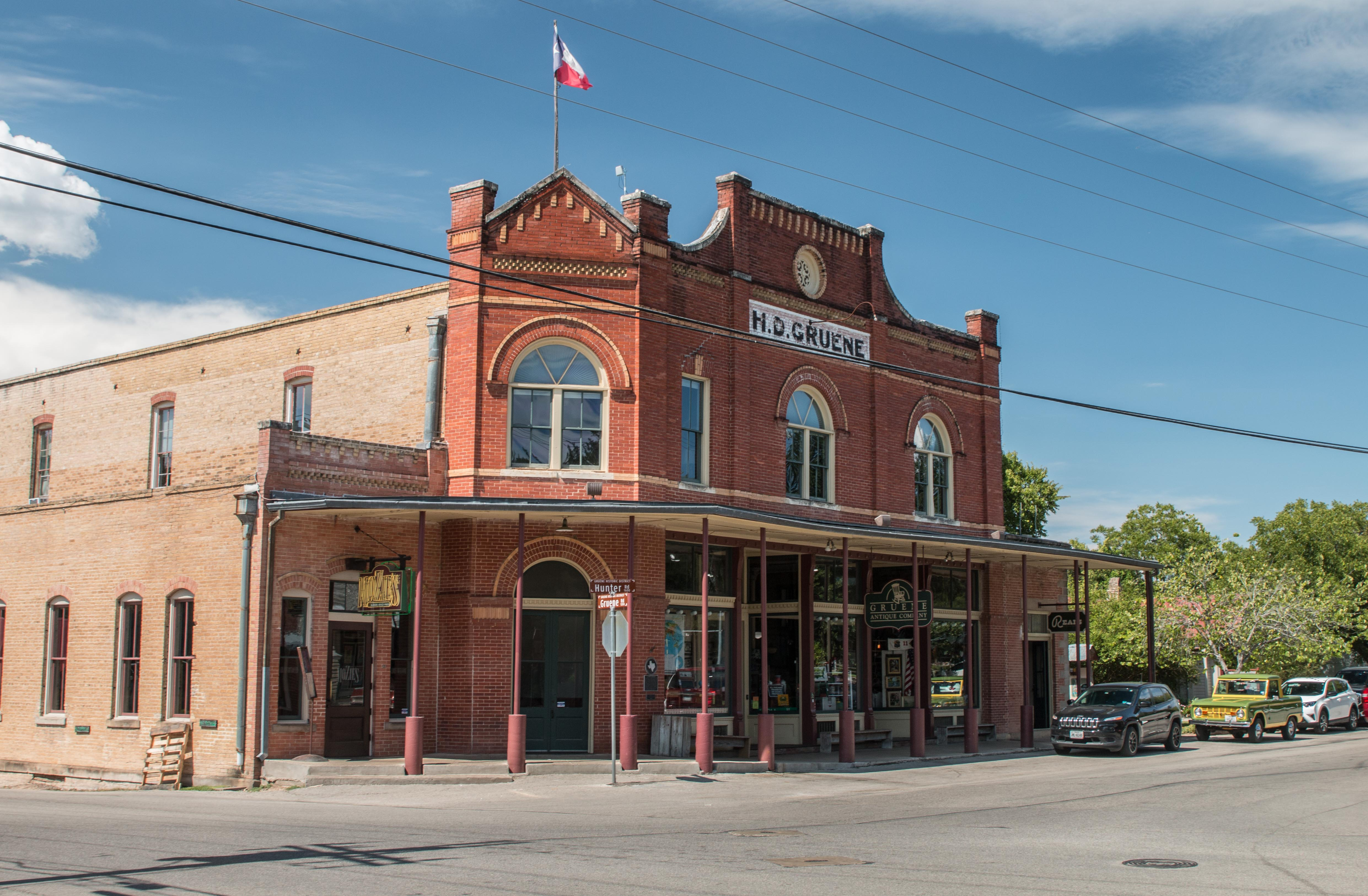
- Gruene Historic District in 2018

- Location within Texas Location within the United States
- Location: Both sides of Sequin, New Braunfels, and Austin Sts., Gruene, Texas
- Coordinates: 29°44′18″N 98°6′14″W
- Area: 25 acres (10 ha)
- Built: 1850
- Built by: Christian Herry
- Architectural style: Late Victorian
- NRHP reference No.: 75001962
- Added to NRHP: April 21, 1975

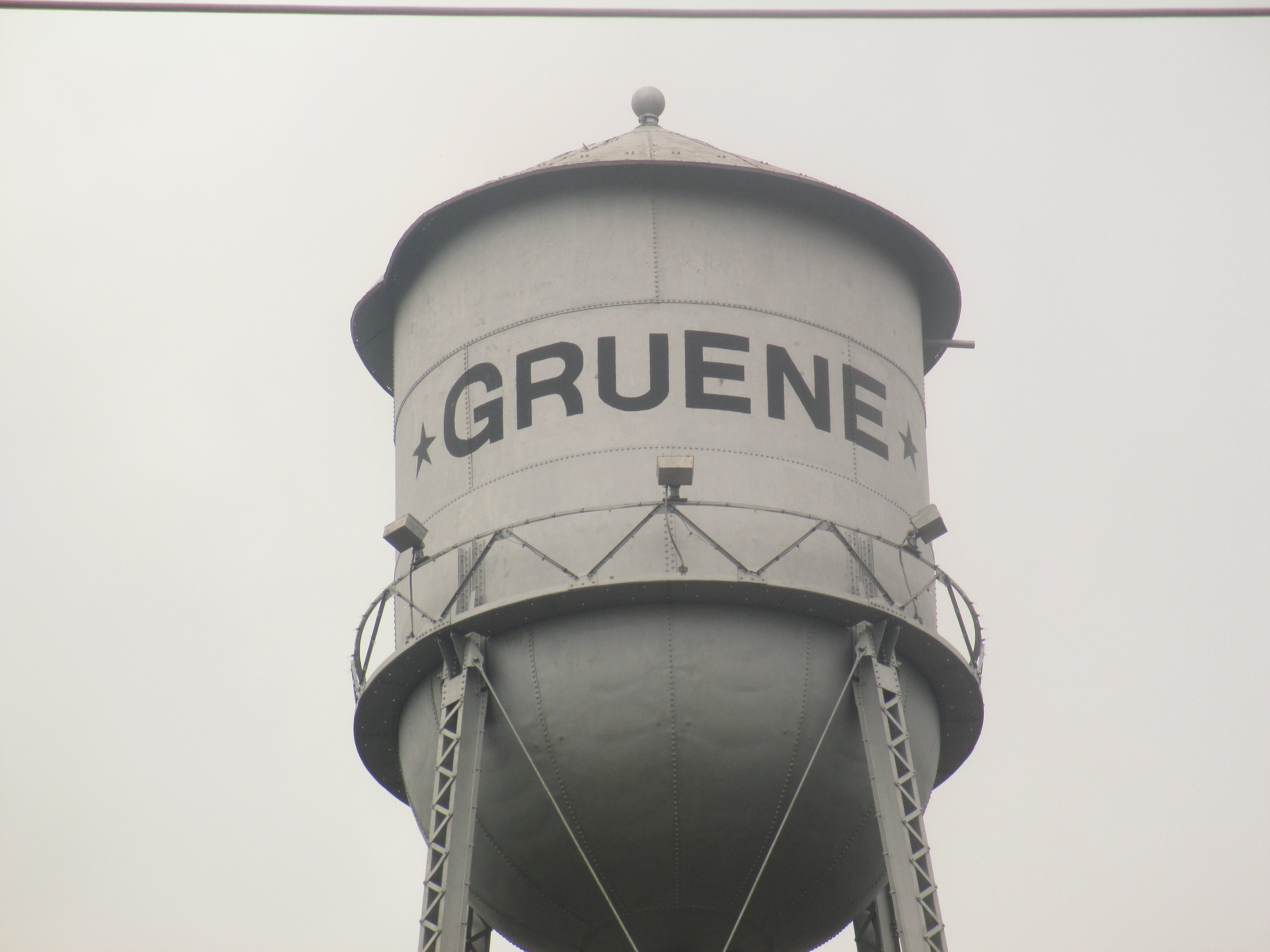
The Gruene water tower stands over the town on a bluff above the Guadalupe River.

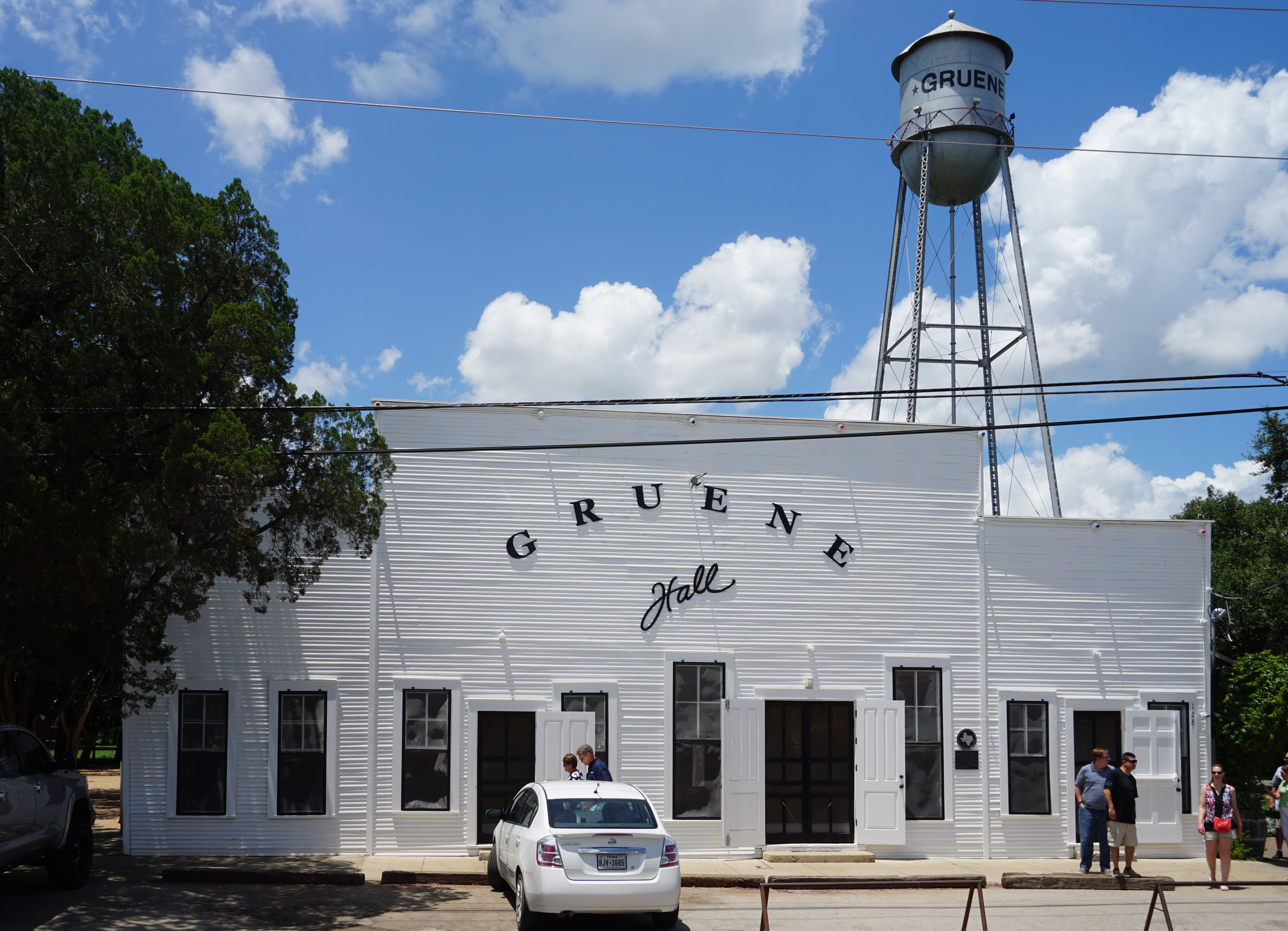
Gruene Hall, built in 1878, is one of the oldest dance halls in Texas.

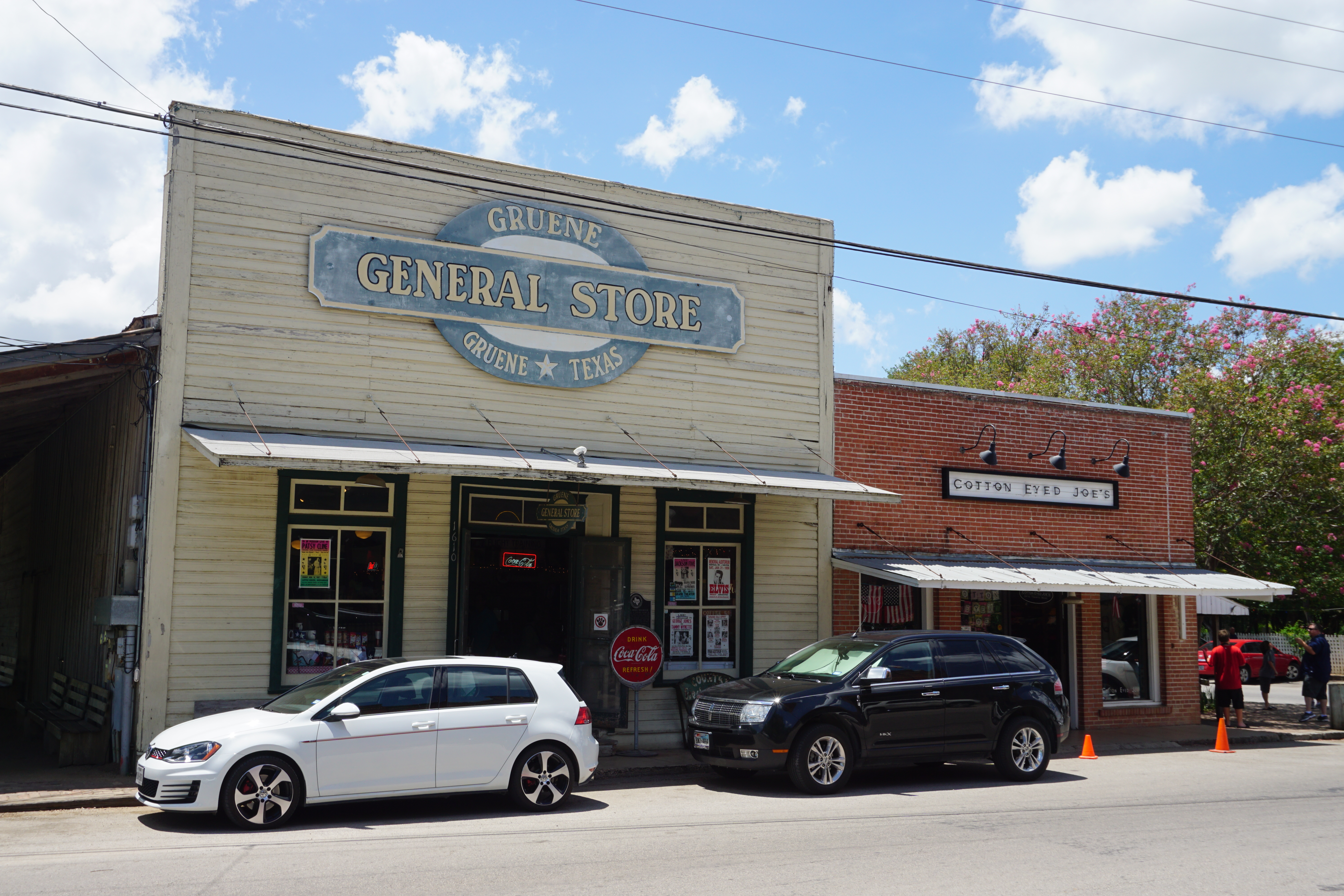
Gruene General Store attracts tourists to the historical community.

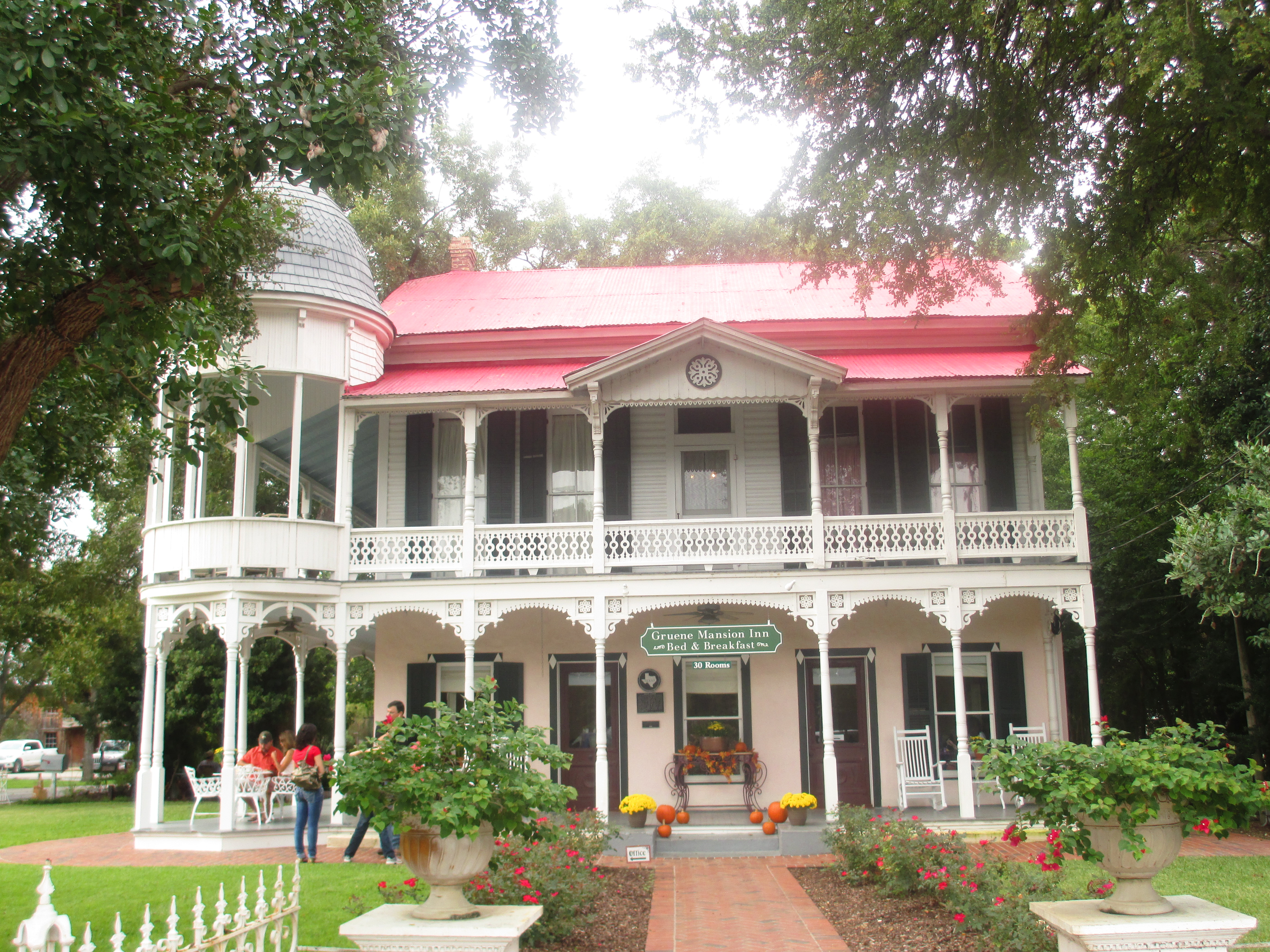
Gruene Mansion Inn and Bed and Breakfast

Gruene (/ˈɡriːn/ GREEN) is a German-Texan town in Comal County in the U.S. state of Texas. Once a significant cotton-producing community along the Guadalupe River, the town has now shifted its economy to one supported primarily by tourism. Gruene, a German surname, (pronounced "Green") is now a district within the city limits of New Braunfels, and much of it was listed in the National Register of Historic Places on April 21, 1975. The city is known for its German-Texan heritage and architecture and many residents of Gruene and New Braunfels are descendants of the first German settlers.

== History ==
=== Establishment and rise to prominence ===
German farmers arriving in the mid 1840s became the first European settlers of what is now known as Gruene, Texas. Ernst Gruene, one such German immigrant, arrived in New Braunfels in 1845, but acreage was scarce there. With his two sons he then purchased land along the Guadalupe River, and he built the first home in Gruene in early Fachwerk, German timber framing house style.

Ernst Gruene's second son, Heinrich (Henry) D. Gruene, built his own house (Gruene Family Home) and planted cotton. As cotton was a top crop it lured up to 30 families to Henry D.'s lands. In addition to his Victorian-style home (now Gruene Mansion Inn), Henry D. was responsible for several buildings in various styles, many still standing: a Victorian cottage, a large brick home, and, for his farm foreman, a frame house (now Gruene Haus). In 1878, Gruene opened a mercantile store to serve the several dozen or so families sharecropping on his land. Originally known as "Goodwin", the town benefited by its location along the stagecoach route between Austin and San Antonio, the store thrived for many years and stimulated local commercial growth. A cotton gin (now Gristmill River Restaurant and Bar) powered by the Guadalupe River was added soon after. Gruene Hall, which opened in 1878, is one of the oldest dance halls in Texas. The Thorn Hill School and three large cotton gins soon followed. By the time the International-Great Northern Railroad was built across Comal County in the 1880s, the small community was bustling with commercial and farming activity, and officially took the name "Gruene" after its founding father and most prominent citizen.

=== Decline and abandonment ===
By 1900, Gruene was a prominent banking, ginning, and shipping center for area cotton farming. Though it never had a post office of its own, the community did possess two freight rail stations by the 1910s. In 1922, the original cotton gin burned and was replaced by a modern electric model down the road (now Adobe Verde). Gruene was decimated, however, by the boll weevil blight of the 1920s, and further doomed by the effects of the Great Depression. By 1930, the population had fallen to 75, and post-World War II highway construction bypassed the town. By 1950, Gruene had become a ghost town.

=== Revival and renaissance ===
In 1974, Chip Kaufman, a UT Austin architecture student, began working to get Gruene on the National Register of Historic Places and sought new owners for properties in the historic district.

Among the new owners was Pat Molak, who purchased Gruene Hall in 1975. Molak and his friend Mary Jane Nalley purchased and repaired several of the town's notable structures and transformed them into thriving businesses. Mary Jane Nalley was later given the Besserung Award by the New Braunfels Chamber of Commerce.

As a result of the restoration of area structures, such as Gruene Hall and the old mercantile store, Gruene began a rebirth of sorts in the early 1970s. Redevelopment and restoration of the area continued throughout the 1970s and 1980s and today, and though no longer an autonomous community (it was annexed by New Braunfels in 1979), Gruene maintains a thriving tourist business. Many original structures from the town's heyday still exist, including the Gruene Family Home, a Victorian-style edifice built in 1872 which is listed on the National Register of Historic Places and today operates as the Gruene Mansion Inn. A historic water tower rises above Gruene Hall, and other buildings at the heart of the district have been renovated into shops and restaurants. There is also a wine-tasting room.

== Significant buildings ==
- Gruene Hall, 6,000 square-foot, open-air dance hall which is one of the oldest in Texas
- Gruene Family Home
- Gruene Cotton Gin

== See also ==
- National Register of Historic Places listings in Comal County, Texas
