= Oak Cliff Masonic Lodge =

Historic building in Dallas, Texas, U.S.

Coordinates: 32.7443°N 96.8231°W

The Oak Cliff Masonic Lodge is a historic building in the North Oak Cliff area of Dallas, Texas. In 2014 the building was declared an official Texas Historical Marker by the Texas Historical Commission.

== Details ==
=== Architect ===
The building was designed in 1919 by Herbert M. Greene, a prominent Dallas architect. Greene also designed Masonic temples and Scottish Rite Cathedrals in San Antonio, El Paso, Amarillo, Dallas and Joplin, Mo. One of the first architects in the South to be a member of the American Institute of Architects, Greene and his firms designed many of the significant buildings and homes in Dallas, including the Dallas National Bank building, the Belo Mansion and a number of buildings at the University of Texas at Austin. In all, he built more than 90 projects throughout Texas and other U.S. cities.

=== Layout ===
In addition to a full basement, the 10,000 square-foot building featured two large “lodge rooms” on the second floor, including one measuring 37x60 feet with 20-foot ceilings. Each room also featured a loft area (accessible by separate stairways) with small windows that look down over the rooms. These loft rooms served as a storage area for the Masons.

=== History ===
In the 1950s, an elevator and central heat/air system was installed. The exterior of the building has not been altered since the 1940s when the front entry was remodeled slightly to accommodate a wider street.

In 2002, the Masons of Oak Cliff Lodge #705 sold the building and moved to a new building three miles south. As of September 2019 this lodge has been completely remodeled inside and out into a stunning event center called The Mason.

== Location ==
Located at 115 S. Beckley Avenue (at Sunset Avenue), adjacent to the Cliff Temple Baptist Church, the three-story lodge was built in 1920 at a cost of $85,000. Part of Dallas Land & Loan Addition No. 2, the building is located just outside the Lake Cliff Historic District, two blocks from historic W.H. Adamson High School, and less than a mile from the Bishop Arts District. The building is just a few blocks south of the house where Lee Harvey Oswald rented a room when he shot President John F. Kennedy.
