= Selma, Texas =

City in Bexar, Comal, and Guadalupe counties in Texas, United States

- City
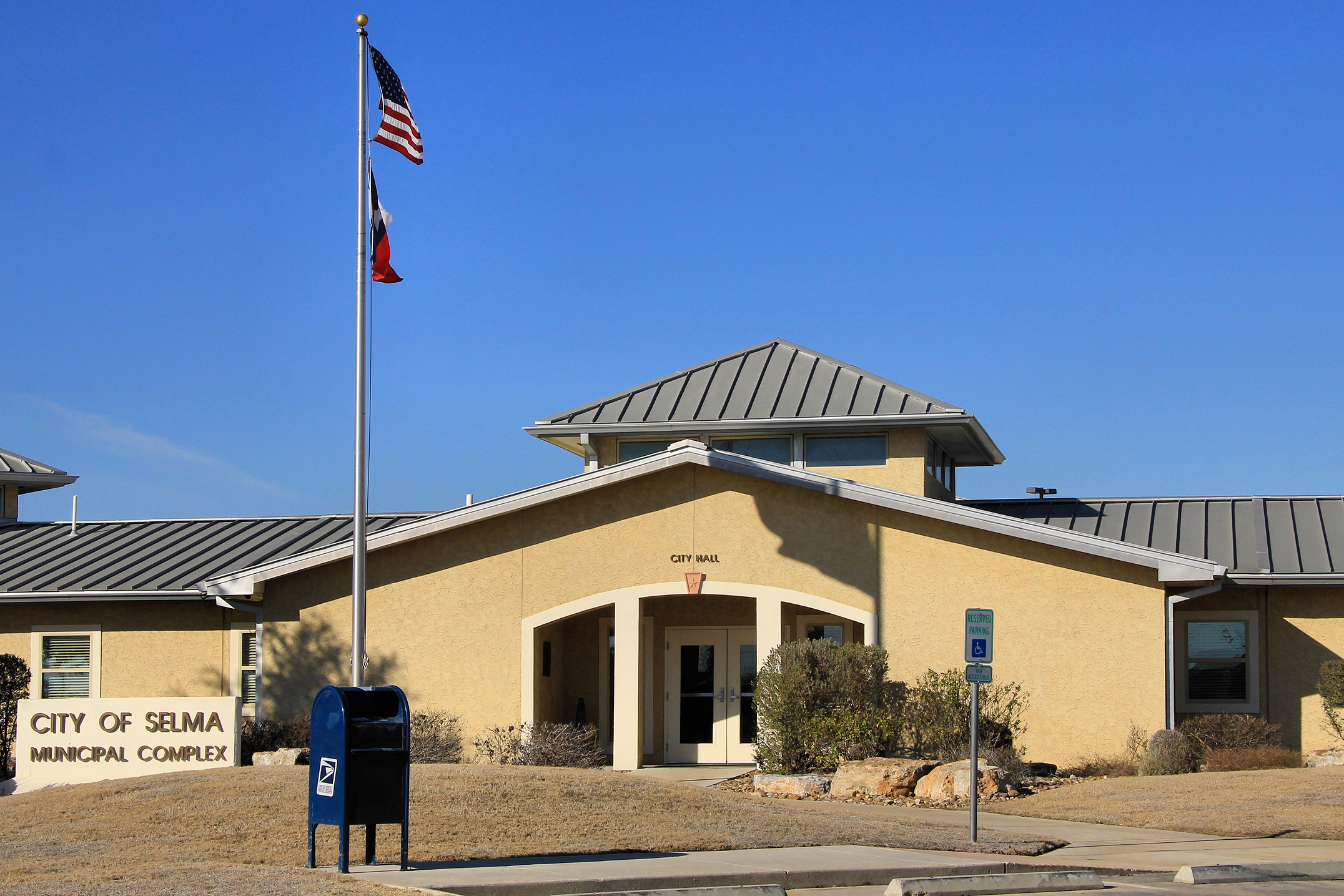
- Selma City Hall, February 2014

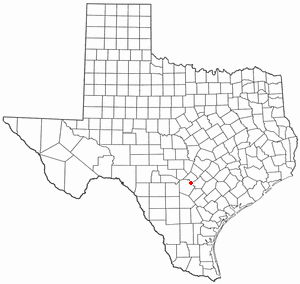
- Location of Selma, Texas

- Coordinates: 29°35′12″N 98°18′48″W
- Country: United States
- State: Texas
- Counties: Bexar, Guadalupe, and Comal
- Incorporated: 1964

Area
  - Total: 5.04 sq mi (13.06 km^{2})
  - Land: 5.03 sq mi (13.04 km^{2})
  - Water: 0.0039 sq mi (0.01 km^{2})
- Elevation: 758 ft (231 m)

Population (2020)
  - Total: 10,952
  - Density: 2,210/sq mi (853.4/km^{2})
- Time zone: UTC-6 (Central (CST))
  - Summer (DST): UTC-5 (CDT)
- ZIP code: 78154
- Area codes: 210, 726
- FIPS code: 48-66704
- GNIS feature ID: 2411864
- Website: ci.selma.tx.us

Selma is a city in Bexar, Comal, and Guadalupe counties in Texas, United States. It is part of the San Antonio metropolitan area. Its population was 10,952 at the 2020 census, up from 5,540 at the 2010 census. Selma was settled by German and Polish immigrants in the mid-1800s.

The Retama Park horse-racing track is located in Selma.

== History ==
Selma was settled in 1847 by immigrants from several European countries. The name Selma is a traditional German feminine name. In 1849, the Harrison and Brown stagecoach stop was built in Selma to handle passengers and freight on the San Antonio to Austin stagecoach line. John Harrison and his wife Martha moved to Selma in 1852, and he became the first postmaster of the town when the post office opened in 1856. Harrison was also co-owner of the Harrison and McCulloch stage line, which ran a postal route through Selma. Harrison's house still stands by Cibolo Creek, where it was built and is listed on the National Register of Historic Places.

German and Polish immigrants constituted most of the next wave of immigrants who settled in the area. By 1885, the population was 145, and at the turn of the century, the population peaked at 600. The population went into a rapid decline, so much so that by 1906, the post office was closed. Selma's population dropped to 100 in 1940. The city incorporated in 1964 and has seen tremendous growth along the Interstate 35 corridor since 2000.

The Retama Racing Park opened in 1995, and The Forum, a 110-shop outdoor mall, opened in 2000. The old Harrison and Brown stagecoach stop was restored and rechristened the Selma Stage Stop, along with a visitor center and park.

Today, Selma is a bustling suburb of San Antonio, but it retains its German and European heritage in its name and in the descendants of Europeans who still call this town home.

== Geography ==
Selma has territory in Guadalupe, Bexar and Comal Counties. The city center is located in northern Bexar County, but City Hall, at 9375 Corporate Drive, is located in Guadalupe County, across the border from the city center. The city is bordered by Schertz to the east, Universal City to the south, Live Oak to the southwest, and part of San Antonio to the northwest. The center of Selma is 18 miles (29 km) northeast of downtown San Antonio and 13 miles (21 km) southwest of New Braunfels.

- I-35 runs through the south-central part of the community, with access from exits 173 and 174.

According to the United States Census Bureau, the city has a total area of 5.1 square miles (13.1 km^{2}), of which 0.004 square miles (0.01 km^{2}), or 0.09%, is covered by water.

== Demographics ==
Historical population
Census	Pop.	Note	%±
1970	207		—
1980	528		155.1%
1990	520		−1.5%
2000	788		51.5%
2010	5,540		603.0%
2020	10,952		97.7%
2021 (est.)	11,619		6.1%
U.S. Decennial Census

=== 2020 census ===
As of the 2020 census, Selma had a population of 10,952. The median age was 33.8 years. 27.5% of residents were under the age of 18 and 8.8% of residents were 65 years of age or older. For every 100 females there were 94.5 males, and for every 100 females age 18 and over there were 91.3 males age 18 and over.

Racial composition as of the 2020 census
Race	Number	Percent
White	5,615	51.3%
Black or African American	1,308	11.9%
American Indian and Alaska Native	90	0.8%
Asian	529	4.8%
Native Hawaiian and Other Pacific Islander	46	0.4%
Some other race	1,036	9.5%
Two or more races	2,328	21.3%
Hispanic or Latino (of any race)	4,426	40.4%

100.0% of residents lived in urban areas, while 0.0% lived in rural areas.

There were 3,943 households in Selma, of which 45.4% had children under the age of 18 living in them. Of all households, 54.0% were married-couple households, 15.5% were households with a male householder and no spouse or partner present, and 23.4% were households with a female householder and no spouse or partner present. About 19.1% of all households were made up of individuals and 4.0% had someone living alone who was 65 years of age or older.

There were 4,138 housing units, of which 4.7% were vacant. The homeowner vacancy rate was 0.8% and the rental vacancy rate was 7.3%.

=== 2000 census ===
As of the census of 2000, 788 people, 286 households, and 217 families were residing in the town. The population density was 161.9 inhabitants per square mile (62.5/km^{2}). The 298 housing units had an average density of 61.2 units per square mile (23.6 units/km^{2}). The racial makeup of the city was 86.55% White, 4.57% African American, 1.14% Native American, 1.27% Asian, 0.38% Pacific Islander, 3.93% from other races, and 2.16% from two or more races. Hispanics or Latinos of any race were 30.46% of the population.

Of the 286 households, 33.9% had children under 18 living with them, 67.1% were married couples living together, 5.2% had a female householder with no husband present, and 24.1% were not families. About 17.8% of all households were made up of individuals, and 4.9% had someone living alone who was 65 or older. The average household size was 2.73, and the average family size was 3.17.

In the town. the age distribution was 25.4% under 18, 8.1% from 18 to 24, 24.9% from 25 to 44, 31.5% from 45 to 64, and 10.2% who were 65 or older. The median age was 40 years. For every 100 females, there were 107.9 males. For every 100 females 18 and over, there were 104.9 males.

The median income for a household in the town was $51,979, and for a family was $62,344. Males had a median income of $39,479 versus $27,222 for females. The per capita income for the city was $22,492. About 5.1% of families and 5.5% of the population were below the poverty line, including 7.8% of those under age 18 and none of those age 65 or over.

== Education ==
The portion in Bexar County is zoned to the Judson Independent School District.

The portion in Comal County is zoned to the Comal Independent School District. Zoned schools for that portion are:

- Garden Ridge Elementary School in Garden Ridge
- Danville Middle School
- Davenport High School

The portion in Guadalupe County is zoned to the Schertz-Cibolo-Universal City Independent School District.

- In 2018 zoned elementary schools included Paschal Elementary and Schertz Elementary, Wilder Intermediate School, Corbett Junior High School, and Samuel Clemens High School.

Our Lady of Perpetual Help Catholic School, a school of the Roman Catholic Archdiocese of San Antonio, is in Selma.

== In popular culture ==
The town was famous as a speed trap as referenced in the Steve Earle song "Guitar Town". Texas Monthly published a feature on Selma in 1974, describing it as "the perfect speed trap".

== Notable person ==
- Kenneth Raymond Fleenor, brigadier general in the U.S. Air Force; mayor of Selma from 1987 to 1994

== See also ==
- List of municipalities in Texas
