= Pieper (disambiguation) =

Anciens Etablissements Pieper was a Belgian carmaker and arms manufacturer

Pieper may also refer to:

- Pieper (surname)
- Pieper High School, in San Antonio, Texas, U.S.
