= Alamo Area Council of Governments =

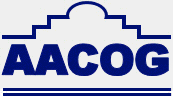
- Logo

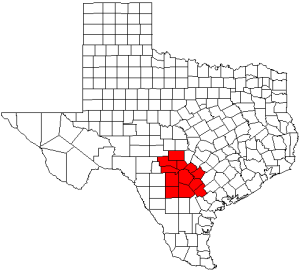
- Map of Texas highlighting counties served by the Alamo Area Council of Governments
- Formation: August 1966
- Type: Voluntary association of governments
- Region served: 11,354 sq mi (29,410 km^{2})
- Members: 13 counties

Historical population
Year	Pop.	±%
2000	1,808,719	—
2010	2,249,718	+24.4%
2020	2,671,161	+18.7%

The Alamo Area Council of Governments (AACOG) is a voluntary association of cities, counties and special districts in the south-central region of the U.S. state of Texas.

Based in San Antonio, the Alamo Area Council of Governments is a member of the Texas Association of Regional Councils.

== Counties served ==
- Atascosa
- Bandera
- Bexar
- Comal
- Frio
- Gillespie
- Guadalupe
- Karnes
- Kendall
- Kerr
- Medina
- McMullen (since 2013)
- Wilson

== Largest cities in the region ==
- San Antonio
- New Braunfels
- Schertz
- Seguin
- Kerrville
- Universal City
- Converse
- Fredericksburg
- Leon Valley
- Live Oak
- Pleasanton
- Hondo
