= Canyon High School (New Braunfels, Texas) =

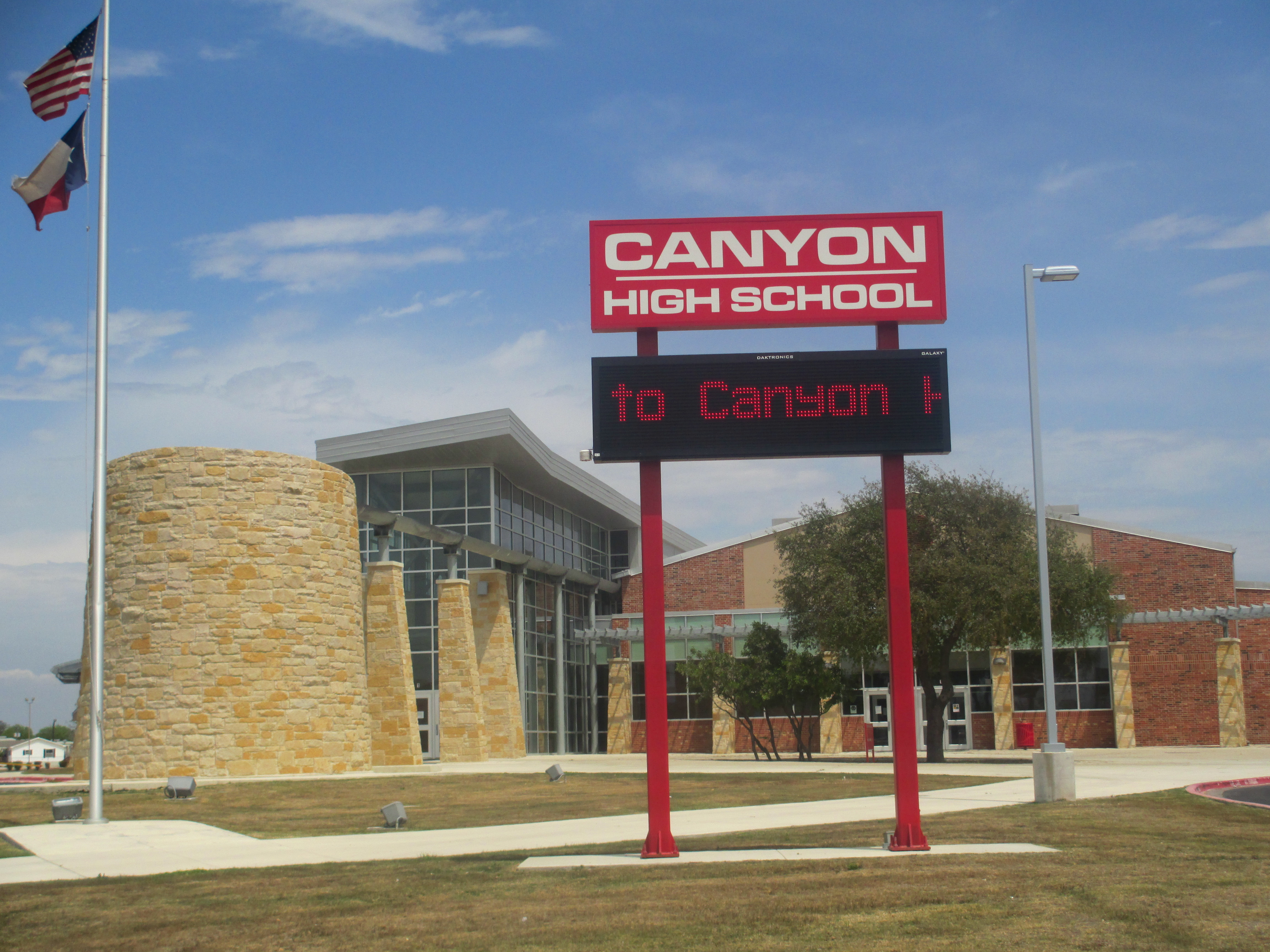

Location
- 1510 IH 35 North; New Braunfels, Texas 78130-2897; United States; 29.7091°N 98.0881°W

Information
- School type: Public high school
- Established: 1950 (Goodwin Rural High School) 1959 (Canyon High School)
- School district: Comal Independent School District
- Dean: Courtney Woodrom
- Principal: TBA
- Teaching staff: 152.92 (FTE)
- Grades: 9-12
- Enrollment: 2,568 (2025–2026)
- Student to teacher ratio: 15.69
- Colors: Red, White & Black
- Athletics conference: UIL Class 6A
- Mascot: Cougar/Cougarette
- Rival: New Braunfels High School
- Newspaper: Cougar Tracks
- Website: chs.comalisd.org

Canyon High School is a public high school located in New Braunfels, Texas, United States, and classified as a 6A high school by the University Interscholastic League (UIL). It is part of Comal ISD and is one of the five high schools in the entire district. Canyon High School is zoned for students who live primarily in the southeastern Comal County area, including portions of New Braunfels as well as Garden Ridge, and portions of Schertz. In 2015, the school was rated "Met Standard" by the Texas Education Agency. It is fed by Church Hill Middle School and Canyon Middle school.

== Athletics ==
The Canyon Cougars compete in the following sports:

- Band (Marching and Colorguard)
- Baseball
- Basketball
- Bowling
- Cross Country
- Football
- Golf
- Powerlifting
- Soccer
- Softball
- Swimming and Diving
- Tennis
- Track & Field
- Volleyball
- Wrestling
- Lacrosse

=== State titles ===
- Bowling
  - Boys Varsity (2017)
- Softball -
  - 2009(4A)
- Volleyball -
  - 1983(4A)
- One Act Play -
  - 1964(2A)
- Colorguard
  - Winter Guard State Championship (2015)

==== State finalist ====
- Baseball -
  - 1985(4A)
- Bowling
  - Boys Varsity (2003, 2004, 2005, 2007, 2008, 2012, 2013, 2014, 2015, 2016, 2017, 2018,2020)
  - Girls Varsity (2005, 2011, 2012, 2013, 2016, 2017,2019)
- Volleyball -
  - 1986(4A), 1989(4A)
- Academic Decathlon
  - 1989, 1990
