= Schertz, Texas =

- City
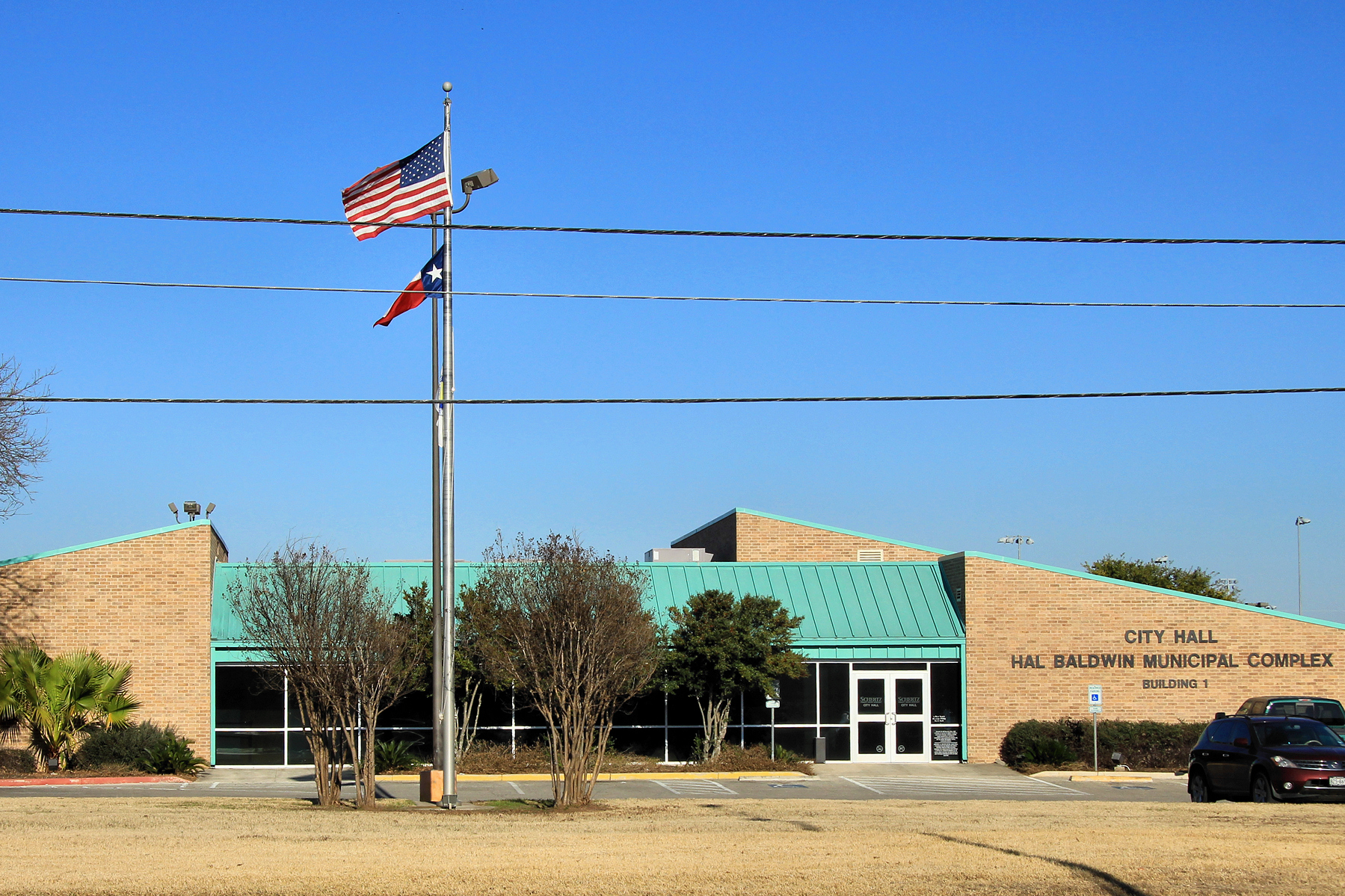
- Schertz City Hall
- Motto: "Community. Service. Opportunity."
- City of Schertz, Texas

- Coordinates: 29°33′54″N 98°15′13″W
- Country: United States
- State: Texas
- Counties: Guadalupe, Bexar, Comal

Government
  - Type: Council-Manager
  - City Council: Mayor

Area
  - Total: 32.27 sq mi (83.57 km^{2})
  - Land: 32.09 sq mi (83.10 km^{2})
  - Water: 0.18 sq mi (0.47 km^{2})
- Elevation: 686 ft (209 m)

Population (2020)
  - Total: 42,002
  - Density: 1,310.4/sq mi (505.94/km^{2})
- Time zone: UTC-6 (Central (CST))
  - Summer (DST): UTC-5 (CDT)
- ZIP code: 78154, 78108, 78132
- Area codes: 210/726, 830
- FIPS code: 48-66128
- GNIS feature ID: 2411838
- Website: schertz.com

Schertz (/ʃɜːrts/ shurts) is a city in Guadalupe, Bexar, and Comal counties in the U.S. state of Texas, within the San Antonio–New Braunfels metropolitan area. The population was 42,002 at the 2020 census, up from 31,465 at the 2010 census. Schertz was named after the Alsatian family who settled in Texas in the 1840s. The Schertz family were some of the first Germanic emigrants to settle in Central Texas. To this day, the area is rich in German heritage and tradition and many residents trace their lineage back to these emigrants.

== History ==
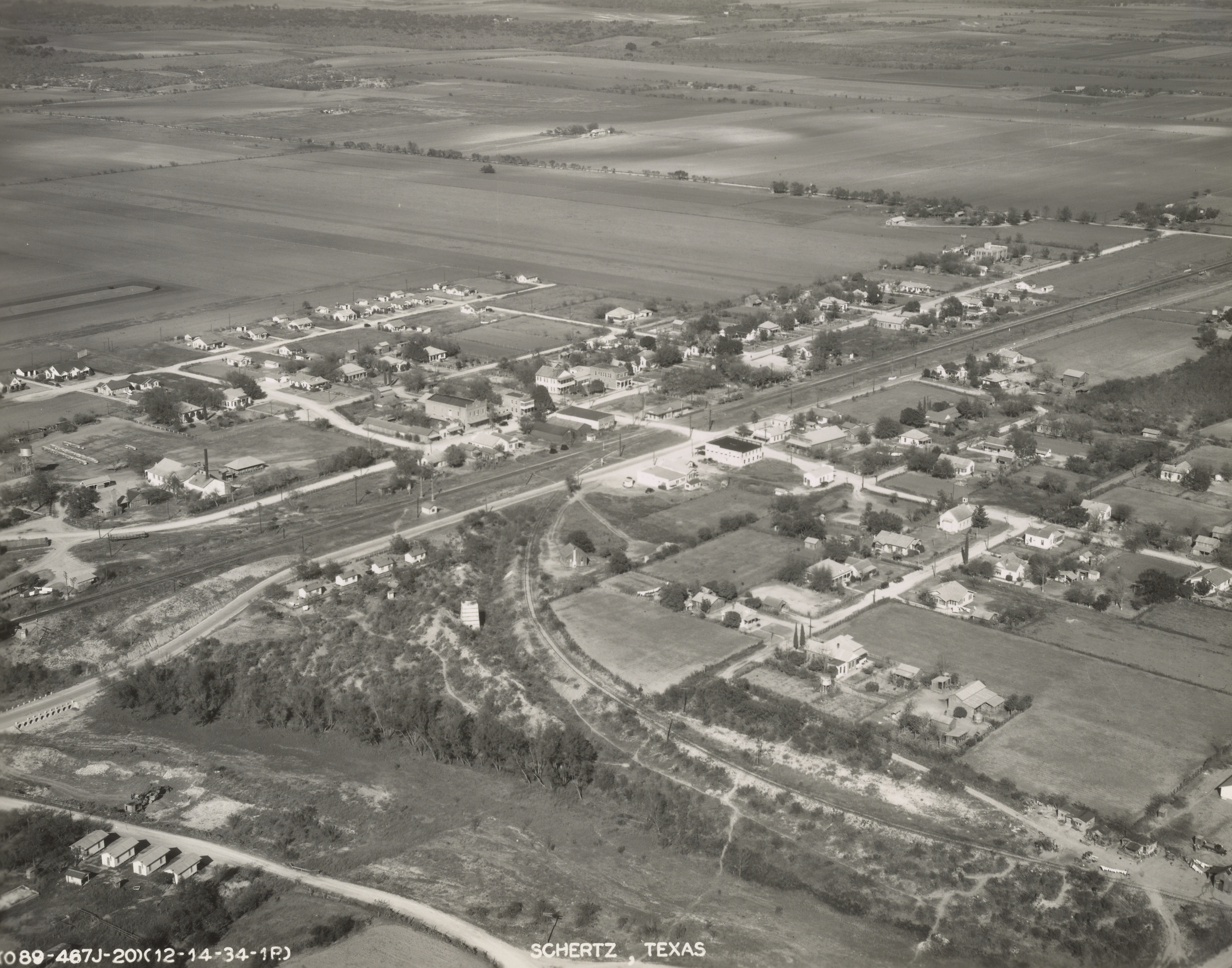
Schertz in 1934

Schertz is the third-largest city in the San Antonio-New Braunfels metropolitan area and the largest city of the Randolph Metrocom, which consists of cities surrounding Randolph Air Force Base. The Metrocom is located on San Antonio's far northeast side. In addition to Schertz, other Randolph Metrocom communities include Live Oak, Kirby, Converse, Marion, Cibolo, Universal City, Windcrest, Garden Ridge, and Selma. These towns are located in Comal, Bexar, and Guadalupe counties and combined have a total of 355,000 residents and growing rapidly.

Since the late 1990s, Schertz experienced substantial growth. In five years, from 2000 to 2005, the city's population jumped from 18,694 to 26,463. In 2006 alone, the population rose from 26,463 to 34,000.

The first settlers came to Schertz around 1843. Some of the families on the immediate land surrounding Schertz were the Boettigers, Schertzs, Schneiders, Seilers, Maskes, and Mergeles. Members of the Schertz family still reside in the city. The first name of Schertz was "Cibolo Pit", then "Cut Off", thus named because when Cibolo Creek flooded, the settlement was cut off.

The first settlers planted wheat, oats, and corn, which did not need special equipment to harvest and process. In later years, cotton was planted, and proved to be a productive cash crop. In 1870, the first gin was built by the Schertz family. It was powered by mules and then later by steam. This gin was located where the post office is at the present time. The second cotton gin built by Weyel and Kallies was between First and Second streets. In later years, there also was a corn sheller and lumber yard. The first school, built in 1890, was across Cibolo Creek where the Randolph Stables are now located. In 1917 a new two-story brick school was built, later torn down to make room for the O'Henry School. The land for the school was donated by Adolph Schertz.

In 1876, one of the largest boosts to Schertz came when the Galveston, Harrisburg, and San Antonio Railroad was built through the town. This gave the people a chance to travel to San Antonio by rail instead of wagon or buggy, besides goods being shipped in and out. The first post office was established in 1882. At that time Schertz was still known as Cut Off. In 1899 it officially became Schertz. Sebastian Schertz owned and operated a general store when the railroad was constructed.

A big and very active shooting club was located on the site that is now the City Park. There was an annual shooting tournament called Koenig Schiessen or "King Shoot". This was a two-day affair with people coming from San Antonio by train. The last night, a big dance was held to close the event for that year. A piece of live coal, blown from a switch engine that was carrying gravel cars to or from the rock crusher, is believed to have blown on the shingle roof of the dance hall, setting it on fire and completely destroying it. It was later rebuilt, but eventually the club disbanded. The rockcrusher was at one time located in Cibolo Creek across from the public utilities of the city of Schertz. This was destroyed in 1913 when Cibolo Creek had its biggest recorded flood.

The first church in Schertz is the present day United Methodist Church on First Street. One of the oldest business buildings, the red brick building on Main Street, was built by Willie Schertz. It is now a plumbing and hardware store and Masonic meeting place. It was the first mercantile store. On the site of the present-day Schertz Bank, a two-story hotel, a five-room hospital and drug store complex was built in 1909. The hotel was built by Henry Ebert. Dr. Watson was the resident doctor. This doctor used two methods of transportation to see his patients, a horse-drawn hack for good roads and horseback for emergencies in bad weather and long distances. In 1917 another red brick hospital on Main Street was built by Dr. C.M. Cotham and Miss Cora Karbach, a nurse. It served the surrounding communities for many years and is now an old apartment house. The first bank was chartered in 1913, and one of the first bankers was Mr. Glass. He organized the National Home Guard during World War I, which drilled at night in the second story of the building that at the present time is the Masonic Lodge meeting place.

Randolph Field (now Randolph Air Force Base) was a boon to Schertz in the late 1920s. Farm land was bought as the Air Corps needed 2,000 acres (8 km^{2}) for the air academy (the "West Point of the Air"), which opened in 1930. There were three sites considered. The present site was chosen because there was less fog in the area and the fog lifted earlier in the day, which meant more flying time. All of this boosted the economy not only for Schertz and the surrounding communities but also for the areas of New Braunfels, Seguin, and San Antonio.

The V.F.W. of Schertz was chartered in 1946. The first fire protection was from the Randolph Field Fire Department. Schertz businesses and citizens organized a fire department, and the first business meeting of the Schertz Fire Department was February 8, 1956. Archie Woodward was the first fire chief. A combination fire station and city hall were built, and the Schertz library is now in this building. A new library has recently been built next to the previous library. Schertz was incorporated as a city by the state of Texas in 1958.

== Geography ==
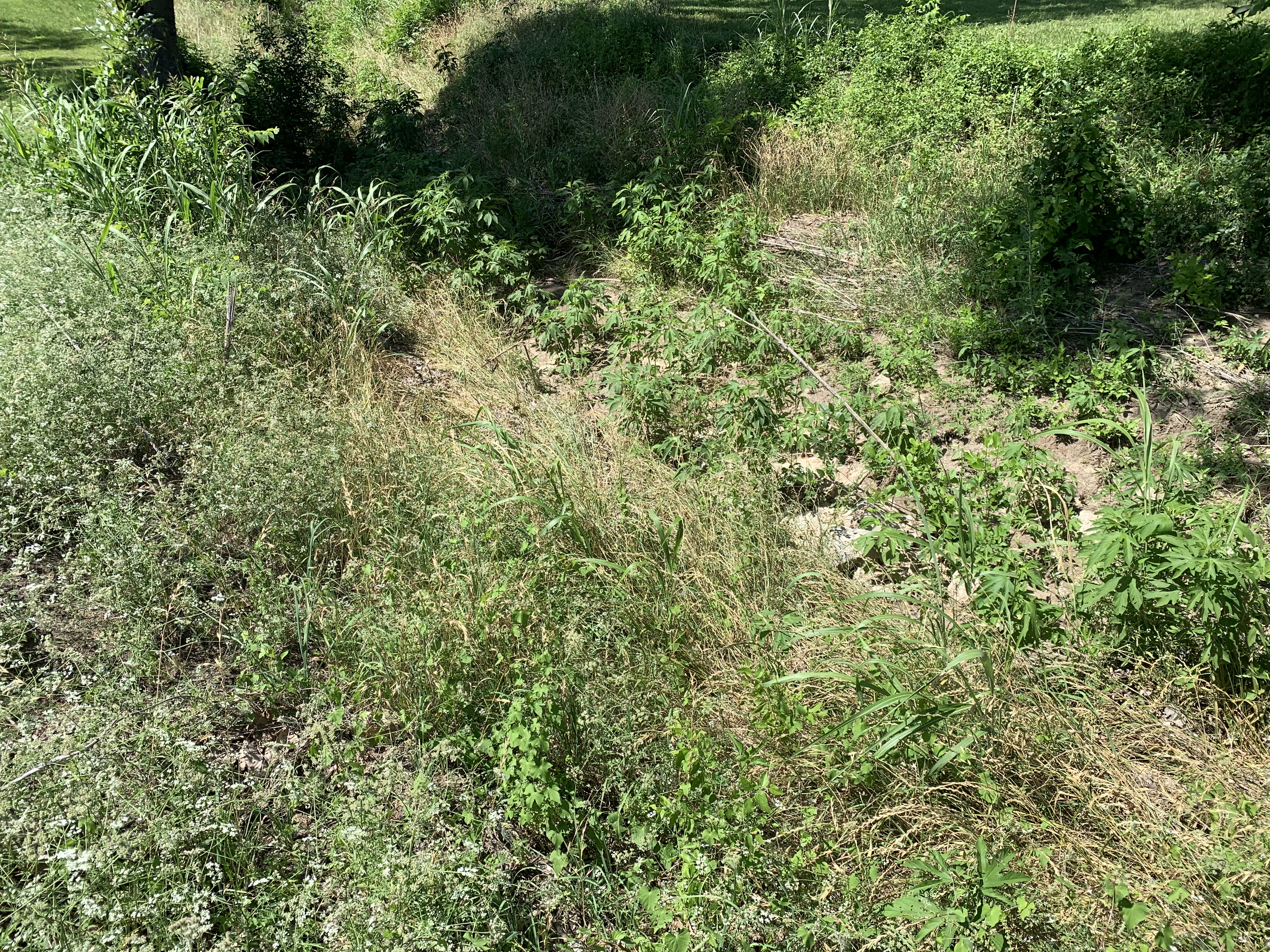
Stone Creek, Shertz Texas

The original center of Schertz is located in western Guadalupe County. City Hall, located at 1400 Schertz Parkway, is also in Guadalupe County. Large tracts of the city now extend north into Comal County and south into Bexar County. Cibolo Creek, forming the boundary between Guadalupe and Bexar counties, runs through the city just south of the historic downtown. Schertz is bordered by Cibolo to the east, a narrow strip of San Antonio to the south along Interstate 10, Converse and Randolph AFB to the southwest, Universal City and Selma to the west, Garden Ridge to the north, and New Braunfels to the northeast.

Interstate 35 runs through the northern part of the city, with access from exits 174 through 180. I-35 runs 19 miles (31 km) southeast to downtown San Antonio and 6 miles (10 km) from the northeastern city limits to the center of New Braunfels.

According to the United States Census Bureau, Schertz has a total area of 28.6 square miles (74.0 km^{2}), of which 28.4 square miles (73.6 km^{2}) is land and 0.19 square miles (0.5 km^{2}), or 0.63%, is water.

A portion of the property of Randolph Field extends beyond the limits of the titular census-designated place, into the Schertz city limits.

== Demographics ==
Historical population
Census	Pop.	Note	%±
1960	2,281		—
1970	4,061		78.0%
1980	7,262		78.8%
1990	10,555		45.3%
2000	18,694		77.1%
2010	31,465		68.3%
2020	42,002		33.5%
U.S. Decennial Census

=== 2020 census ===
As of the 2020 census, Schertz had a population of 42,002, a median age of 38.9 years, and 11,570 families residing in the city. 25.5% of residents were under the age of 18 and 14.3% of residents were 65 years of age or older. For every 100 females there were 92.8 males, and for every 100 females age 18 and over there were 89.7 males age 18 and over.

95.6% of residents lived in urban areas, while 4.4% lived in rural areas.

There were 14,952 households in Schertz, of which 39.2% had children under the age of 18 living in them. Of all households, 59.2% were married-couple households, 12.9% were households with a male householder and no spouse or partner present, and 23.1% were households with a female householder and no spouse or partner present. About 19.4% of all households were made up of individuals and 8.3% had someone living alone who was 65 years of age or older.

There were 15,715 housing units, of which 4.9% were vacant. The homeowner vacancy rate was 1.9% and the rental vacancy rate was 7.1%.

Racial composition as of the 2020 census
Race	Number	Percent
White	23,989	57.1%
Black or African American	5,153	12.3%
American Indian and Alaska Native	345	0.8%
Asian	1,274	3.0%
Native Hawaiian and Other Pacific Islander	133	0.3%
Some other race	2,947	7.0%
Two or more races	8,161	19.4%
Hispanic or Latino (of any race)	13,147	31.3%

=== 2010 census ===
As of 2010, there were 31,465 people, 6,604 households, and 5,283 families residing in the city. The population density was 755.9 inhabitants per square mile (291.9/km^{2}). There were 7,009 housing units at an average density of 283.4 units per square mile (109.4 units/km^{2}). The racial makeup of the city was 82.0% White, 6.6% African American, 0.5% Native American, 1.8% Asian, 0.2% Pacific Islander, 5.5% from other races, and 3.4% from two or more races. Hispanic or Latino of any race were 19.5% of the population.

There were 6,604 households, out of which 42.1% had children under the age of 18 living with them, 67.2% were married couples living together, 10.0% had a female householder with no husband present, and 20.0% were non-families. 16.7% of all households were made up of individuals, and 5.3% had someone living alone who was 65 years of age or older. The average household size was 2.82 and the average family size was 3.17.

In the city, the population was spread out, with 29.3% under the age of 18, 6.7% from 18 to 24, 33.0% from 25 to 44, 22.2% from 45 to 64, and 8.8% who were 65 years of age or older. The median age was 35 years. For every 100 females, there were 93.9 males. For every 100 females age 18 and over, there were 91.3 males.

The median income for a household in the city was $55,156, and the median income for a family was $59,745. Males had a median income of $38,655 versus $28,203 for females. The per capita income for the city was $21,938. About 4.2% of families and 5.2% of the population were below the poverty line, including 6.0% of those under age 18 and 8.4% of those age 65 or over.

A large number of Schertz's population is connected with the military due to the presence of adjacent Randolph Air Force Base and nearby Fort Sam Houston and Lackland Air Force Base, which can result in some degree of population turnover due to the transient nature of military service.

== Arts and culture ==
- The Wilenchik Walk for Life is an annual community fundraising event in March benefiting the University of Texas Health Science Center at San Antonio's Cancer Therapy and Research Center. This is a 5K walk and fun run.
- Absolute Jazz is the city's annual one-day jazz festival.
- In May, Homes for Pets holds its annual Doggie Dash at Pickrell Park, a 5K fun run, and a 3K walk.
- Schertz EMS Week is held in May throughout its service area with activities ranging from a golf tournament to the EMS Extravaganza at the Forum Shopping Center. Money raised helps fund community outreach programs as well as the Bobby Dilworth Scholarship Fund.
- The Schertz Police Department holds its annual Police Memorial Day in May.
- The Schertz Sweetheart Pageant is held in May to select the city's ambassadors to area parades and festivals.
- The Schertz Fourth of July Jubilee, one of the largest parades and festivals in Central and South Texas, salutes the men and women who serve in the United States Armed Forces.
- The annual SchertzFest in late September features performers, food, beverages, and more in a salute to the founding of the City of Schertz.
- Schertz City departments, businesses, and civic and community groups participate in the annual Trunk or Treat celebration at Pickrell Park on October 31. This event is organized by Schertz Fire Rescue and provides a safe, enjoyable environment for children as an alternative to traditional trick-or-treating.
- The winter holiday season includes the Senior Arts and Crafts Bazaar in November, and the Festival of Angels in December.

== Government ==
The City of Schertz is a member of the Alamo Area Council of Governments.

== Education ==
Area school systems that cover the city include:

In Guadalupe County:

- Schertz-Cibolo-Universal City Independent School District
  - Schools in Schertz include Schertz Elementary School, Green Valley Elementary School, Norma J. Paschal Elementary School, Rose Garden Elementary School, Laura Ingalls Wilder Intermediate School, Ray D. Corbett Junior High School, and Samuel Clemens High School
  - As of 2018, some parts are zoned to Watts Elementary School in Cibolo

In Bexar County:

- Schertz-Cibolo-Universal City Independent School District
- East Central Independent School District

In Comal County:

- Comal Independent School District (all parts of Schertz in Comal County) - Zoned schools are:
  - Comal Creek Elementary School in Schertz (most) and Garden Ridge Elementary School in Garden Ridge (some)
  - Danville Middle School in Schertz
  - Davenport High School

Private schools:

- John Paul II Catholic High School

== Notable people ==
- Sherman Corbett, MLB player and UTSA Roadrunners baseball head coach
- Steve Earle, alternative country rocker, grew up in Schertz
- Colton Haynes, actor and model
- A. J. Johnson, NFL player
- Sean Porter, NFL player
- Robert Reid, NBA player

== Awards and recognition ==
- 2007 #1 Best Place to Live in Texas; #40 Best Place to Live in the US (CNNMoney.com)
- 2009 #39 Best Place to Live in the US (CNNMoney.com)
- 2013 #28 of 50 top safest cities in Texas (Safewise)
- 2015 #36 of 50 top safest cities in Texas (Safewise)
- 2018 #69 top safest cities in Texas (Alarms.org (The National Council for Home Safety and Security))

== In film ==
In the 2000s, Schertz was a prime location for filming movies in the San Antonio area. In March 2007, the Cevallos Brothers filmed a portion of the movie The Ace in the Hole on location in Schertz. In 2005, the indie film Klay World: Off The Table was filmed by Robert Benfer in various desolate areas around Schertz. Avenue of the Strongest: A September 11 Memorial Exhibit was also filmed in Schertz.

== See also ==
- List of municipalities in Texas
