= Sophienburg Museum and Archives =

Museum in New Braunfels, Texas

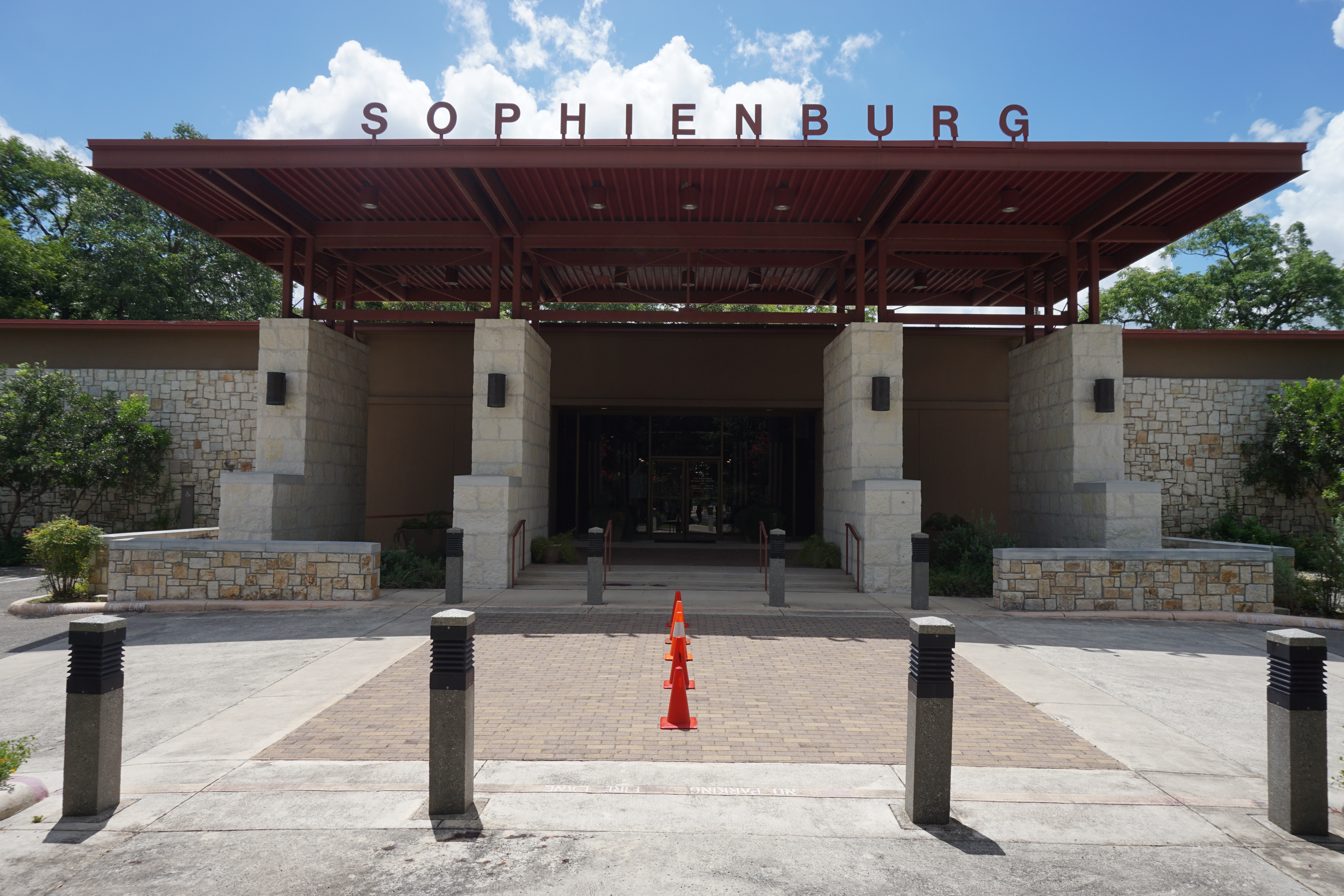

- Location within Texas Location within the United States
- Established: 1933
- Location: 401 W. Coll St. New Braunfels, Texas; United States
- Coordinates: 29°41′51″N 98°07′26″W
- Director: Jennifer Singleterry
- Curator: Keva Hoffmann Boardman
- Website: sophienburg.com

The Sophienburg Museum and Archives is a public museum located in New Braunfels, Texas, United States. It was established in 1933 as a museum and library by residents of New Braunfels. The library section of the building would eventually be converted into the city's archive. It occupies the site of the former headquarters of the Adelsverein, the German colonization effort of Texas. The museum contains an extensive collection of artifacts which reflect the history and rich German-Texan heritage of the area. It is a Texas Historic Site.

== History ==
Prince Carl of Solms-Braunfels, a German prince who served as Commissioner-General of the Adelsverein, ordered the construction of the "Sophienburg" (transl. Sophie's castle) in 1845, named after his wife Princess Sophie. At that point, the Sophienburg was a log cabin constructed on a hilltop in what became New Braunfels. The fortress served as the headquarters of the Adelsverein until the campaign's bankruptcy in 1853. With the original cabin and structures destroyed in a storm in 1886, the Sophienburg was left abandoned until 1926, when New Braunfels' residents purchased the site of the original fortress; in 1933, they established a museum chartered by the State of Texas and the Emilie Seele Faust Memorial Library, the city's first library. A new library, the Dittlinger Memorial Library, was built on the site and opened in 1967, and was later moved to the current library location in 1999. The current museum and archives now occupies the former Dittlinger Memorial Library.

The museum memorializes New Braunfels' origin as a German colony, its strong German roots, and the city's history and progression as a whole. It comprises over 100,000 artifacts spread across a rotating collection of exhibits. Among the exhibits are displays demonstrating the belongings of the original German settlers of the New Braunfels area. Artifacts from later residents of the area, including clothing, furniture, and tools, are also on display. The archives store over one million photographs, documents, and maps, some of which originate from the original German settlement of the area. The museum also contains Sophie's Shop, a gift shop which sells authentic German items including steins, ornaments, hats, and other New Braunfels souvenirs.

Throughout 2019, the Sophienburg hosted an exhibit memorializing the impact of World War I on the majority-German town. It commemorated its 90th anniversary in 2023 with an outdoor celebration and the opening of three additional exhibits. The Sophienburg plays a major role in community events in New Braunfels such as the Oktoberfest celebration "Wurstfest", the local Christmas Market "Weihnachtsmarkt", and an annual "Bürger Ball", a dance and social event similar to those held by the town's residents in the early 20th century. In 2022 and 2025, the Texas Travels Awards named the Sophienburg Museum as its best big-market museum in Texas.
