= Pieper High School =

Location
- 1400 Kinder Pkwy, San Antonio, TX; San Antonio, Texas 78260; United States; 29.72192°N 98.47072°W

Information
- School type: High School
- Established: 2021; 5 years ago
- School district: Comal Independent School District
- Superintendent: John Chapman III
- Principal: Lauran Knight
- Grades: 9-12
- Enrollment: 2,253 (2025–2026)
- Colors: Purple, Gold and White
- Athletics conference: UIL Class 6A
- Mascot: Warrior
- Website: phs.comalisd.org

Pieper High School is a public high school serving the area around Timberwood Park in Comal Independent School District North of San Antonio, Texas. The school first opened for the 2021 school year and is named for August Anton Pieper, an early settler of the region. The school was reclassed into the UIL 6A athletic classification for the 2026 school year.

== Athletics ==
=== Football ===
The Warriors saw a successful 2023 season, qualifying for the UIL Football Playoffs for the first time since the school's founding and advancing to the quarterfinal game in the 5A Division 2 playoffs, in which they lost to Liberty Hill. This was followed by another successful 11-1 season in 2024, in which they made it to the area game, and in 2025 when they made it to the regional game, both in 5A Division 1.

=== Soccer ===
The warriors boys won state championship in 2026.

== Achievements ==
=== PTA Reflections ===
In April of 2025, the National PTA Reflections was hosted at Davenport High School (Texas), where select students from Pieper High School, who had participated in the event, received awards for their works.
