= Timberwood Park, Texas =

- Census-designated place
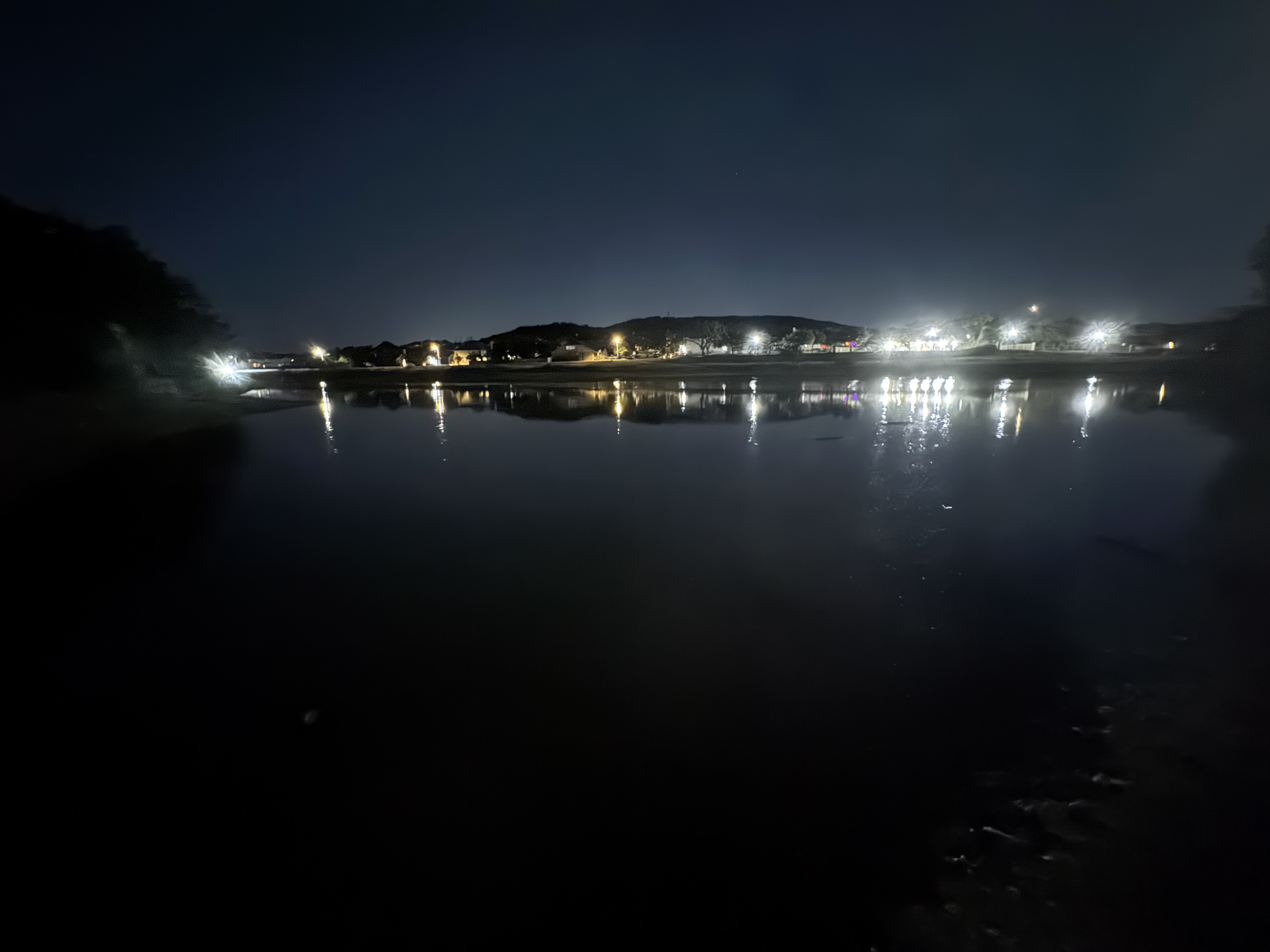
- Lake Countdown City facing North.

- Coordinates: 29°41′41″N 98°29′29″W
- Country: United States
- State: Texas
- County: Bexar

Area
  - Total: 21.07 sq mi (54.6 km^{2})
  - Land: 21.02 sq mi (54.4 km^{2})
  - Water: 0.05 sq mi (0.13 km^{2})
- Elevation: 1,234 ft (376 m)

Population (2020)
  - Total: 35,217
  - Density: 1,675/sq mi (646.9/km^{2})
- Time zone: UTC-6 (Central (CST))
  - Summer (DST): UTC-5 (CDT)
- Zip Code: 78260
- Area codes: 830 and 210
- FIPS code: 48-73057
- GNIS feature ID: 1867569
- ANSI Code: 2409324

Timberwood Park is a census-designated place (CDP) in far northern unincorporated Bexar County, Texas, United States and located within the southern edge of the Texas Hill Country. The district has roughly 42 miles of roads and encompasses over 2,000 acres. The overall plan shows 3,263 platted lots. The population was 35,217 at the 2020 census, up from 13,447 at the 2010 census. It is part of the San Antonio metropolitan area.

== Geography ==
Timberwood Park is a neighborhood exclusive from other separate neighborhoods that abut Canyon Golf Road to its east, by Deer Cross Lane and Midnight Drive to its south, Borgfeld Road to its north, and Blanco Road up to Slumber Pass on the west, with the most northwesterly border of the neighborhood encompassing only so far west as Bubbling Brook Drive, Sunny Meadow Drive, Silent Hollow, Symphonic Hill, and Streisand Street. Timberwood Park is approximately 22 miles (35 km) north of downtown San Antonio.

According to the United States Census Bureau, the CDP has a total area of 21.07 square miles (54.6 km^{2}), of which 21.02 square miles (54.4 km^{2}) is land and 0.05 square miles (0.13 km^{2}) is water.

=== Climate ===
Timberwood Park has a humid subtropical climate (Köppen: Cfa) featuring long, hot, and muggy summers and mild to cool winters. The area is subject to descending northern cold fronts and arctic fronts in the winter with cool to cold nights, typically seeing night lows at or near freezing and is cool to warm and rainy in the spring and fall. The area can also be subject to fairly regular ice and snow storms, with the most productive snowstorm in recent history dumping between 9-10 inches of snow between February 14 and 18 in 2021 "2021 Texas Snowfall totals" (PDF). NOAA. and the most recent snowstorm dropping 0.3 inches overnight on January 21, 2025. The area had its most recent ice storm depositing 0.05 of an inch of ice on January 15, 2024.

Timberwood Park falls in USDA hardiness zone 8b (15 °F to 20 °F).

Timberwood Park observes an average of 17 subfreezing nights each year. The area also sees an average of 25 100 °F+ days each summer, but some years feature none (2021) or may suffer through dozens such days as was the case in 2022 (49) and 2023 (72).

Climate data for Timberwood Park (Rainfall/Snowfall, 2008-2024; Temperature, 2017-2024)
Month	Jan	Feb	Mar	Apr	May	Jun	Jul	Aug	Sep	Oct	Nov	Dec	Year
Mean Monthly Temperature (°F)	51.0	53.9	63.7	68.8	77.0	83.1	85.3	85.9	80.5	71.1	60.3	55.2	69.7
Average Monthly Rainfall (in.)	2.14	1.56	1.98	2.67	4.65	2.25	2.36	1.74	5.51	3.96	2.08	1.83	32.73
Average Monthly Snowfall (in.)	0.04	0.63	0.00	0.00	0.00	0.00	0.00	0.00	0.00	0.00	0.00	0.12	0.79
Source: Wunderground Source: climate.gov

== Demographics ==
Historical population
Census	Pop.	Note	%±
1990	2,578		—
2000	5,889		128.4%
2010	13,447		128.3%
2020	35,217		161.9%
U.S. Decennial Census; 1850–1900 1910; 1920 1930 1940; 1950 1960 1970; 1980 1990 2000; 2010

Timberwood Park first appeared as a census designated place in the 1990 U.S. census.

=== Racial and ethnic composition ===
Timberwood Park CDP, Texas – Racial and ethnic composition Note: the US Census treats Hispanic/Latino as an ethnic category. This table excludes Latinos from the racial categories and assigns them to a separate category. Hispanics/Latinos may be of any race.
Race / Ethnicity (NH = Non-Hispanic)	Pop 2000	Pop 2010	Pop 2020	% 2000	% 2010	% 2020
White alone (NH)	4,464	7,642	17,670	75.80%	56.83%	50.17%
Black or African American alone (NH)	62	625	1,668	1.05%	4.65%	4.74%
Native American or Alaska Native alone (NH)	18	40	88	0.31%	0.30%	0.25%
Asian alone (NH)	62	588	1,921	1.05%	4.37%	5.45%
Native Hawaiian or Pacific Islander alone (NH)	0	12	51	0.00%	0.09%	0.14%
Other race alone (NH)	10	15	172	0.17%	0.11%	0.49%
Mixed race or Multiracial (NH)	80	312	1,390	1.36%	2.32%	3.95%
Hispanic or Latino (any race)	1,193	4,213	12,257	20.26%	31.33%	34.80%
Total	5,889	13,447	35,217	100.00%	100.00%	100.00%

=== 2020 census ===
As of the 2020 census, Timberwood Park had a population of 35,217. The median age was 38.9 years. 28.0% of residents were under the age of 18 and 12.4% of residents were 65 years of age or older. For every 100 females there were 97.4 males, and for every 100 females age 18 and over there were 95.1 males age 18 and over.

99.9% of residents lived in urban areas, while 0.1% lived in rural areas.

There were 11,712 households in Timberwood Park, including 6,069 families, of which 44.9% had children under the age of 18 living in them. Of all households, 70.2% were married-couple households, 10.4% were households with a male householder and no spouse or partner present, and 15.6% were households with a female householder and no spouse or partner present. About 14.1% of all households were made up of individuals and 4.7% had someone living alone who was 65 years of age or older.

There were 12,517 housing units, of which 6.4% were vacant. The homeowner vacancy rate was 2.2% and the rental vacancy rate was 14.4%.

Racial composition as of the 2020 census
Race	Number	Percent
White	21,011	59.7%
Black or African American	1,765	5.0%
American Indian and Alaska Native	214	0.6%
Asian	1,986	5.6%
Native Hawaiian and Other Pacific Islander	68	0.2%
Some other race	2,145	6.1%
Two or more races	8,028	22.8%
Hispanic or Latino (of any race)	12,257	34.8%

=== 2000 census ===
As of the census of 2000, there were 5,889 people, 2,002 households, and 1,721 families residing in the CDP. The population density was 309.5 inhabitants per square mile (119.5/km^{2}). There were 2,065 housing units at an average density of 108.5 per square mile (41.9/km^{2}). The racial makeup of the CDP was 90.25% White, 1.10% African American, 0.46% Native American, 1.09% Asian, 4.33% from other races, and 2.77% from two or more races. Hispanic or Latino of any race were 20.26% of the population. The area submitted a petition signed by more than 4,100 residents to the City of San Antonio seeking immediate annexation - a ploy to get permission from the Texas Legislature to incorporate under Texas Statutory law.

There were 2,002 households, out of which 44.7% had children under the age of 18 living with them, 78.2% were married couples living together, 5.6% had a female householder with no husband present, and 14.0% were non-families. 11.4% of all households were made up of individuals, and 2.8% had someone living alone who was 65 years of age or older. The average household size was 2.94 and the average family size was 3.18.

In the CDP, the population was spread out, with 29.4% under the age of 18, 5.4% from 18 to 24, 31.5% from 25 to 44, 27.5% from 45 to 64, and 6.2% who were 65 years of age or older. The median age was 38 years. For every 100 females, there were 100.2 males. For every 100 females age 18 and over, there were 96.7 males.

The median income for a household in the CDP was $79,053, and the median income for a family was $83,203. Males had a median income of $52,196 versus $36,761 for females. The per capita income for the CDP was $34,385. About 1.8% of families and 3.4% of the population were below the poverty line, including 5.5% of those under age 18 and 5.6% of those age 65 or over.

== Education ==
Timberwood Park is served by the Comal Independent School District, and North East Independent School District.

The CISD portion is assigned to:

- Timberwood Park, Specht, and Kinder Ranch elementary schools
- Most residents are in the Pieper Ranch Middle zone, with some in the Bulverde Middle zone. Previously, most residents were in the Spring Branch Middle School zone, with some in the Smithson Valley Middle zone.
- Pieper High School - Previously it was Smithson Valley High School until Pieper opened in 2021.

The NEISD portion is assigned to:

- Tuscany Heights Elementary School
- Portions zoned to Bush Middle School and Tejeda Middle School
- Portions zoned to Ronald Reagan High School and Lady Bird Johnson High School

=== History of schools ===
Previously areas in Timberwood Park in NEISD had Oak Meadow Elementary as the overflow school.

Roan Forest Elementary previously served sections of the NEISD portion.

Reagan previously served all of the NEISD portion. After Johnson opened, portions of Timberwood Park were reassigned to Johnson.
