= Church Hill School =

Historic school in Texas

Church Hill School is a historic school located in New Braunfels, Texas. It was opened in 1870, making it the first school opened in the area.

Built in 1870, St.Martin's Evangelical Lutheran pastors held day school in the building for years. It served the Hortontown and Neigborsville farm communities.
