= The Scooter Store =

American healthcare company

The Scooter Store, Ltd.
- Company type: Private
- Industry: Power mobility provider in the durable medical equipment product category
- Founded: 1991
- Founder: Doug and Susanna Harrison
- Defunct: 2013
- Fate: Chapter 11 bankruptcy
- Headquarters: New Braunfels, Texas, U.S.
- Area served: USA
- Key people: Doug Harrison, Founder, Member of Board Of Directors
- Products: Power Chairs, Mobility Scooters, Power Chair and Scooter Vehicle Lifts, Wheelchair and Scooter Ramps, Lift Chairs, Accessories, Rehab Products
- Revenue: US$332 million (2008)

The Scooter Store, Ltd. (stylized as The SCOOTER Store) was a privately company based in New Braunfels, Texas which sold power mobility products, including mobility scooters, motorized wheelchairs and related products and accessories. The company served 48 U.S. states and Puerto Rico.

Following a raid by the FBI in February 2013, The Scooter Store filed for Chapter 11 bankruptcy and ceased all cash sales to the public.

Effective October 26, The Scooter Store lost its federal contract with Medicare eliminating the ability to sell assets in a Chapter 11 bankruptcy. The company entered liquidation and terminated its employees on September 13, 2013.

In May 2016, the Justice Department announced that no criminal charges would be laid against former Scooter Store executives.

== History ==
Doug and Susanna Harrison founded The Scooter Store in 1991 in New Braunfels, Texas.

In 2003, the company filed a federal lawsuit against the Department of Health and Human Services (HHS) for wrongfully denying Medicare claims. The Centers for Medicare and Medicaid Services (CMS) claimed that their own "Certificate of Medical Necessity" did not certify medical necessity. The federal government counter-sued the company. The Scooter Store agreed to settle its dispute with the government in 2007, having already recovered the majority of the claims in question.

In 2007, the company founded its Alliance Seating & Mobility Division.

By 2009, The Scooter Store had 129 locations across the United States, employed 2,368 people, and served more than 400,000 customers.

In September 2010, the company announced the creation of a new division focusing on Home Care equipment, accessories, and related services to complement its traditional power mobility business. The Home Care division provides manual wheelchairs, walkers, patient lifts, nebulizers, hospital beds, support surfaces and accessories and oxygen equipment in select markets.

In February 2011, The Scooter Store announced a new strategic partnership with an affiliate of Sun Capital Partners for financing to fuel the company's growth and potential acquisitions needed to serve the growing ranks of senior Americans.

On March 22, 2012, Doug Harrison stepped down as CEO of The Scooter Store. Harrison and the board of directors decided it was the best time for new leadership. Jay Randal Bishop took over as temporary CEO until the board of directors could find a successor. Harrison remained a member of the board of directors and was one of the company's largest stockholders.

On February 20, 2013, federal agents with search warrants raided The Scooter Store's New Braunfels headquarters. According to various news sources, the FBI agents were there to investigate the company's billing practices. Company spokespeople declined to comment to the press.

On March 8, 2013, The Scooter Store placed all employees on "unpaid furlough" with certain exceptions. This was done by mass email from the CEO.

On March 19, 2013, 1,500 employees received an email from CEO Marty Landon announcing the "unpaid furlough" to end on March 31, 2013, whereafter they would be officially laid off. 300 employees were asked to come back for an unspecified amount of time.

On April 16, 2013, The Scooter Store filed for Chapter 11 bankruptcy.
