= Victoria Scott =

American novelist

- Born: February 1, 1982 (age 44); New Braunfels, Texas, U.S.
- Occupation: Author
- Writing career
- Genre: Young adult
- Website: www.victoriascott.com

Victoria Scott (born 1982) is an American writer of young adult fiction novels. She's the author of Titans and the Fire & Flood series published by Scholastic Press, as well as the Dante Walker trilogy published by Entangled Teen. Scott's novels have been bought and translated in eleven foreign markets.

== Early life and career ==
Scott was born in New Braunfels, Texas and currently resides in Dallas, Texas with her husband and daughter. In 2018, Scott founded Scribbler, a subscription box service for writers/novelists with Lindsay Cummings.

== Reception ==
Titans received a starred review in Publishers Weekly. Salt & Stone, received a starred review by Kirkus Reviews, and the first book in the series, Fire & Flood, has been nominated as a YALSA Teens' Top 10 book for 2015.

== Publications ==
=== Dante Walker Trilogy ===
- The Collector (2013) (ISBN 1620612429)
- The Liberator (2013) (ISBN 1622660161)
- The Warrior (2014) (ISBN 1622662792)

=== Fire & Flood series ===
- Fire & Flood (2014) (ISBN 0545537460)
- Salt & Stone (2015) (ISBN 0545537487)

=== Standalone novels ===
- Titans (2016) (ISBN 0545806011)
- Violet Grenade (2017)
- Hear the Wolves (2017)
