= Comal Independent School District =

School district in Texas, United States

Comal Independent School District is a public school district based in New Braunfels, Texas, United States.

The district covers 589 square miles (1,530 km^{2}) in five Central Texas counties - Comal, Bexar, Hays, Kendall, and Guadalupe. Incorporated communities in the district include Bulverde, Garden Ridge, and portions of New Braunfels and Schertz. The unincorporated communities of Canyon Lake, Fischer, Sattler, Startzville, Spring Branch, and Timberwood Park also lie within the district.

In 2009, the school district was rated "recognized" by the Texas Education Agency.

The first school in what would become the district is the Church Hill School.

== Schools ==
=== Disciplinary Alternative Education Programs ===
Grades K-12

- Comal Discipline Center (New Braunfels)

=== High schools ===
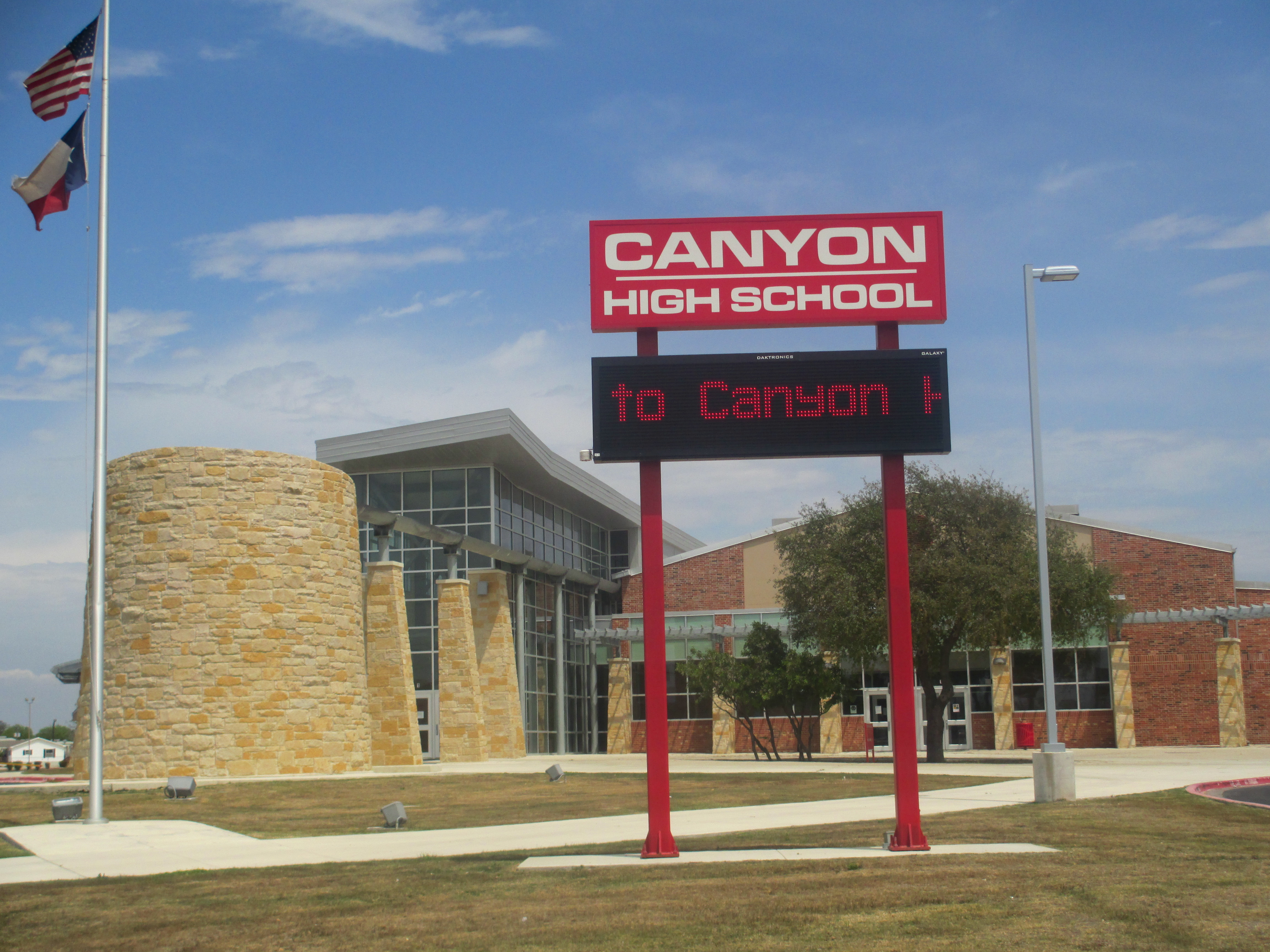
Canyon High School

Grades 9-12

- Canyon High School (New Braunfels)
- Canyon Lake High School (Fischer)
- Smithson Valley High School (Spring Branch)
- Davenport High School (Garden Ridge)
- Pieper High School (Timberwood Park)
- Memorial Early College High School (New Braunfels): An Early College High School (ECHS), a New Technology High School (NTN), and a Science, Technology, Engineering, and Math Academy (STEM)
- Hill Country College Preparatory High School (Spring Branch)

=== Middle schools ===
Grades 6-8

- Bulverde Middle School (Bulverde)
- Canyon Middle School (New Braunfels)
- Church Hill Middle School (New Braunfels) – formerly Canyon Intermediate
- Danville Middle School (Garden Ridge)
- Mountain Valley Middle School (Sattler)
- Pieper Ranch Middle School (Timberwood Park)
- Smithson Valley Middle School (Spring Branch)
- Spring Branch Middle School (Spring Branch)

=== Elementary schools ===
Grades PK-5

- Arlon Seay Elementary School (Spring Branch)
- Bill Brown Elementary School (Spring Branch)
- Clear Spring Elementary School (New Braunfels)
- Comal Creek Elementary School (New Braunfels)
- Freiheit Elementary School (New Braunfels)
- Farias-Spitzer Elementary School (New Braunfels)
- Garden Ridge Elementary School (Garden Ridge)
- Goodwin Frazier Elementary School (New Braunfels)
- Hoffmann Lane Elementary School (New Braunfels)
- Indian Springs Elementary School (Timberwood Park)
- Johnson Ranch Elementary School (Bulverde)
- Kinder Ranch Elementary School (Timberwood Park)
- Mayfair Elementary School (New Braunfels)
- Morningside Elementary School (New Braunfels)
- Mountain Valley Elementary School (Sattler)
- Oak Creek Elementary School (New Braunfels)
- Rahe Bulverde Elementary School (Bulverde)
- Rebecca Creek Elementary School (Fischer)
- Specht Elementary School (Timberwood Park)
- Startzville Elementary School (Startzville)
- Timberwood Park Elementary School (Timberwood Park)
