= Kenneth Raymond Fleenor =

- Born: October 2, 1929; Bowling Green, Kentucky, U.S.
- Died: December 10, 2010 (aged 81); San Antonio, Texas, U.S.
- Burial place: Holy Cross Cemetery; San Antonio, Texas; 29.60080°N 98.33750°W
- Military career
- Allegiance: United States of America
- Branch: United States Air Force
- Service years: 1952–1980
- Rank: Brigadier General
- Awards: Silver Star; Legion of Merit (2); Distinguished Flying Cross (2); Bronze Star Medal (2); Purple Heart (2); Air Medal (8); Air Force Commendation Medal (2)
- Other work: Mayor of Selma, Texas (1987–94)

Brigadier General Kenneth Raymond Fleenor (October 2, 1929 – December 10, 2010) was a senior officer in the United States Air Force. A prisoner of war in Vietnam, Fleenor served as Base Commander of Randolph Air Force Base in the late 1970s. He was also mayor of Selma, Texas, after his military retirement.

== Early life and education ==
He was born in Bowling Green, Kentucky. Entering Western Kentucky University after his high school graduation, he earned a B.S. degree in agriculture in 1952 and was commissioned into the United States Air Force in January of that year through the ROTC. He was a 1958 graduate of the Squadron Officer School of Air University and a 1967 graduate of Armed Forces Staff College.

== Military career ==
His initial aviation training was at Bryan Air Force Base in Texas, where he received his aviator badge in 1953. Supplemental aviation instruction at Moody Air Force Base in Georgia and Tyndall Air Force Base in Florida qualified him to pilot the F-86 Sabre. He was briefly stationed at McGhee Tyson Airport in Tennessee before being deployed as a pilot with the 39th Flying Training Squadron to Japan in 1954 for a three-year tour of duty. During his service in Japan, he eventually rose to the position of flight commander.

Fleenor was assigned to Laredo Air Force Base in 1957 where he was a flight instructor and flight commander. In a 1962 duty exchange with the United States Navy, he was sent to NAS Meridian in Mississippi and NAS Pensacola in Florida where he became qualified on the F-4 Phantom II. His training enabled him to help the Air Force integrate the F-4 into its inventory, and he became part of a 1963 vanguard to establish F-4 combat training at MacDill Air Force Base in Florida. When the Air Force subsequently established its first F-4 squadron in 1964 at Davis-Monthan Air Force Base in Arizona, Fleenor was put in charge as operations officer and squadron commander.

Deployed to Vietnam in July 1967, his F-4 Phantom was shot down on December 17. During his prisoner of war captivity in North Vietnam, he endured starvation and torture. Upon his repatriation to the United States on March 14, 1973, he was stationed at Randolph Air Force Base as Instructor pilot, Wing Deputy Commander of Operations, Base Commander, Wing Commander, and Deputy Chief of Staff for Operations Air Training Command. He was promoted to the rank of Brigadier General on July 1, 1978, and retired from the Air Force in 1980.

=== Military awards ===
Fleenor was the recipient of numerous military awards.

| Silver Star |
| Legion of Merit |
| Distinguished Flying Cross |
| Bronze Star Medal with oak leaf cluster and "V" device |
| Purple Heart with oak leaf cluster |
| Air Medal with seven oak leaf clusters |
| Air Force Commendation Medal with oak leaf cluster |
| Air Force Outstanding Unit Award with "V" device and five oak leaf clusters. |
| Prisoner of War Medal |

== Post military career ==
After he retired from the military, he was elected to the city council of Selma, Texas in 1984 and served as mayor of Selma 1987–1994. He was regional coordinator of the Texans War on Drugs, and General Manager of the San Antonio Stock Show & Rodeo. He also served on various corporate boards of directors in his retirement years.

== Personal life ==
Fleenor married Anne Elizabeth Read. They had five children. In 1997, Fleenor was inducted as a distinguished alumnus of Western Kentucky University. Fleenor died December 10, 2010, and was buried at Holy Cross Cemetery in San Antonio. His wife died February 12, 2012.

In 2013, the base theater at Randolph Air Force Base was renamed the Fleenor Auditorium in his honor.
