= Garden Ridge, Texas =

- City
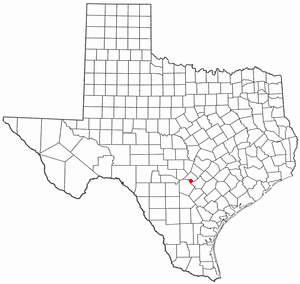
- Location of Garden Ridge, Texas

- Coordinates: 29°37′46″N 98°17′57″W
- Country: United States
- State: Texas
- County: Comal

Area
  - Total: 7.36 sq mi (19.06 km^{2})
  - Land: 7.14 sq mi (18.49 km^{2})
  - Water: 0.22 sq mi (0.56 km^{2})
- Elevation: 899 ft (274 m)

Population (2020)
  - Total: 4,186
  - Density: 578.4/sq mi (223.32/km^{2})
- Time zone: UTC-6 (Central (CST))
  - Summer (DST): UTC-5 (CDT)
- ZIP code: 78266
- Area codes: 210, 726 (planned)
- FIPS code: 48-28248
- GNIS feature ID: 2410569
- Website: www.ci.garden-ridge.tx.us

Garden Ridge is a city in Comal County, Texas, United States, incorporated in 1972. The population was 4,186 at the 2020 census, up from 3,259 at the 2010 census. Garden Ridge is part of the Texas German belt region, and area settled by German emigrants in the mid 1800s. Many residents of Garden Ridge are ancestors of these German emigrants. It is part of the San Antonio metropolitan statistical rea.

== Geography ==
Garden Ridge is located in southern Comal County and is bordered to the south by the city of Schertz. Interstate 35 runs through Schertz, 3 miles (5 km) south of the center of Garden Ridge; the highway leads southwest 20 miles (32 km) to downtown San Antonio and northeast 11 miles (18 km) to New Braunfels.

According to the United States Census Bureau, Garden Ridge has a total area of 7.3 square miles (19.0 km^{2}), of which 0.23 square miles (0.6 km^{2}), or 2.96%, is covered by water.

== Demographics ==
Historical population
Census	Pop.	Note	%±
1980	647		—
1990	1,450		124.1%
2000	1,882		29.8%
2010	3,259		73.2%
2020	4,186		28.4%
U.S. Decennial Census

=== 2020 census ===
As of the 2020 census, Garden Ridge had a population of 4,186. The median age was 52.3 years. 19.9% of residents were under the age of 18 and 25.8% of residents were 65 years of age or older. For every 100 females there were 99.1 males, and for every 100 females age 18 and over there were 97.6 males age 18 and over.

88.3% of residents lived in urban areas, while 11.7% lived in rural areas.

There were 1,516 households in Garden Ridge, of which 30.8% had children under the age of 18 living in them. Of all households, 80.9% were married-couple households, 6.5% were households with a male householder and no spouse or partner present, and 10.7% were households with a female householder and no spouse or partner present. About 10.5% of all households were made up of individuals and 6.2% had someone living alone who was 65 years of age or older.

There were 1,553 housing units, of which 2.4% were vacant. The homeowner vacancy rate was 0.9% and the rental vacancy rate was 2.2%.

Racial composition as of the 2020 census
Race	Number	Percent
White	2,814	67.2%
Black or African American	382	9.1%
American Indian and Alaska Native	27	0.6%
Asian	136	3.2%
Native Hawaiian and Other Pacific Islander	7	0.2%
Some other race	133	3.2%
Two or more races	687	16.4%
Hispanic or Latino (of any race)	863	20.6%

=== 2010 census ===
As of the census of 2010, 3,259 people were living in Garden Ridge.

=== 2000 census ===
As of the census of 2000, 1,882 people, 704 households, and 622 families were residing in the city. The population density was 238.9 people per sq mi (92.2/km^{2}). The 722 housing units had an average density of 91.7/sq mi (35.4/km^{2}). The racial makeup of the city was 93.84% White, 2.23% African American, 0.11% Native American, 1.12% Asian, 0.11% Pacific Islander, 1.43% from other races, and 1.17% from two or more races. Hispanics or Latinos of any race were 7.55% of the population.

Of the 704 households, 29.7% had children under 18 living with them, 83.7% were married couples living together, 3.8% had a female householder with no husband present, and 11.6% were not families. About 9.2% of all households were made up of individuals, and 4.7% had someone living alone who was 65 or older. The average household size was 2.67, and the average family size was 2.85.

In the city, the age distribution was 22.5% under 18, 4.1% from 18 to 24, 18.3% from 25 to 44, 40.1% from 45 to 64, and 14.9% who were 65 or older. The median age was 47 years. For every 100 females, there were 100.9 males. For every 100 females aged 18 and over, there were 96.0 males.

The median income for a household in the city was $90,184, and for a family was $92,269. Males had a median income of $68,750 versus $37,708 for females. The per capita income for the city was $40,201. About 1.6% of families and 1.8% of the population were below the poverty line, including 1.3% of those under age 18 and 4.0% of those age 65 or over.

== Education ==
Garden Ridge is served by the Comal Independent School District (CISD).

Students of the CISD living in Garden Ridge attend Garden Ridge Elementary School, Danville Middle School, Davenport High School, and Canyon High School.

The elementary school is across from the Garden Ridge municipal complex.
