= Davenport High School (Texas) =

Public school in Texas, United States

Location
- 1404 IH 35 N New Braunfels, Texas 78130; United States; 29.6556°N 98.3087°W

Information
- School type: Public high school
- Established: 2020
- School district: Comal Independent School District
- Principal: Angela Looney
- Teaching staff: 84.38 (on an FTE basis)
- Grades: 9–12
- Enrollment: 1,263 (2025–2026)
- Student to teacher ratio: 15.18
- Colors: Maroon & Gray
- Athletics conference: UIL Class 4A
- Mascot: Wolf
- Website: dhs.comalisd.org

Davenport High School is a public high school in Comal ISD in Texas. It opened in August 2020 and mainly services the Garden Ridge area.

== History ==
Davenport High School was opened for public enrollment in August 2020. The name Davenport is a tribute to the former name of the townsite where the school is located.

There had already existed a school under the name of Davenport in the area prior to the establishment of Davenport High School, although following World War 2, the former was consolidated with two other schools to form Comal Elementary School.

== Achievements ==
The Davenport High School marching band earned a bronze medal in the 2024 UIL 4A Marching Band Competition. In the 2025 UIL 4A Marching Band Competition, Davenport’s marching band earned a silver medal. In 2026, the Davenport High School marching band earned the gold medal and were named state champions of the UIL 4A Marching Band Competition.
