= New Braunfels, Texas =

- City
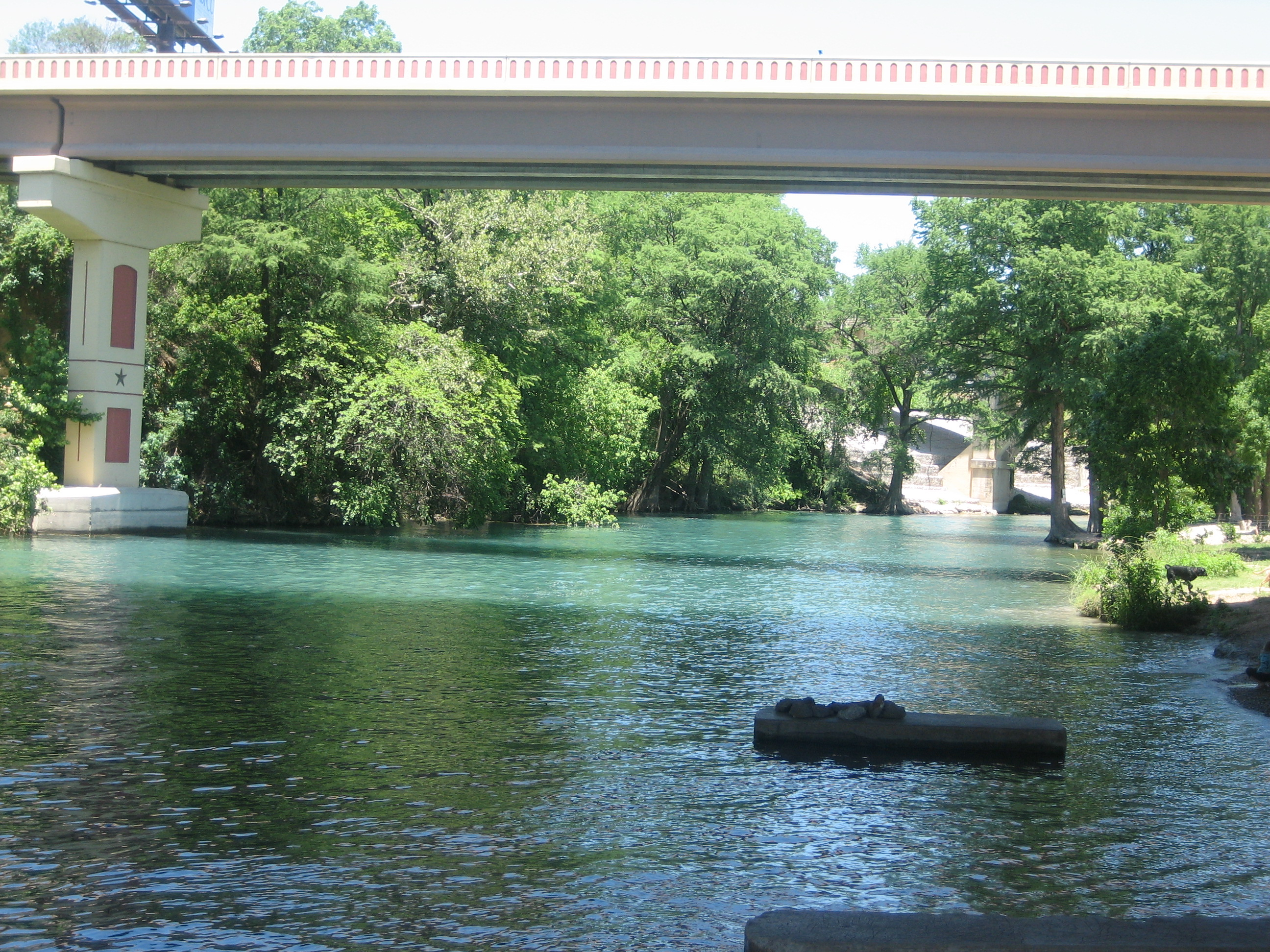
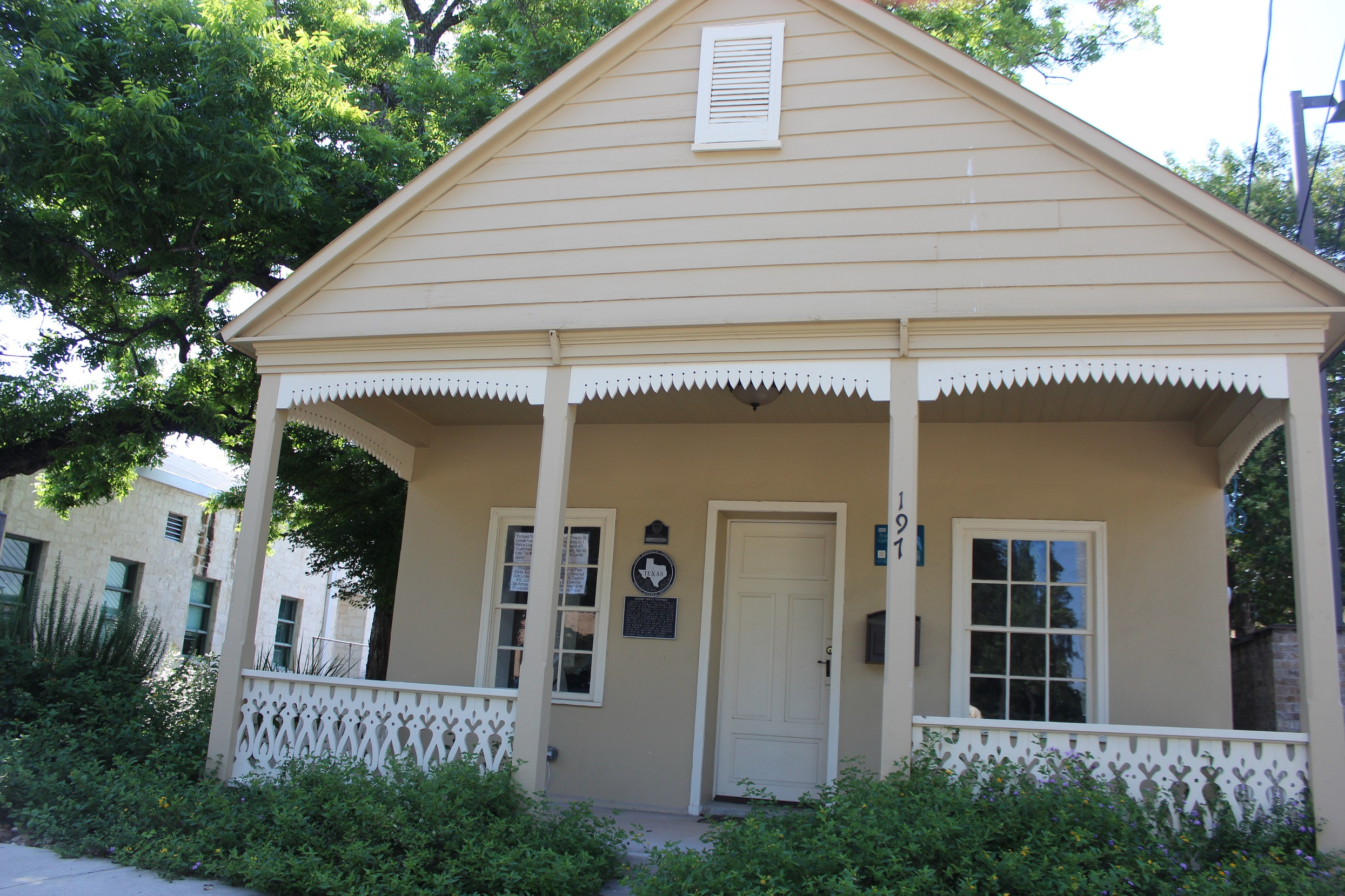
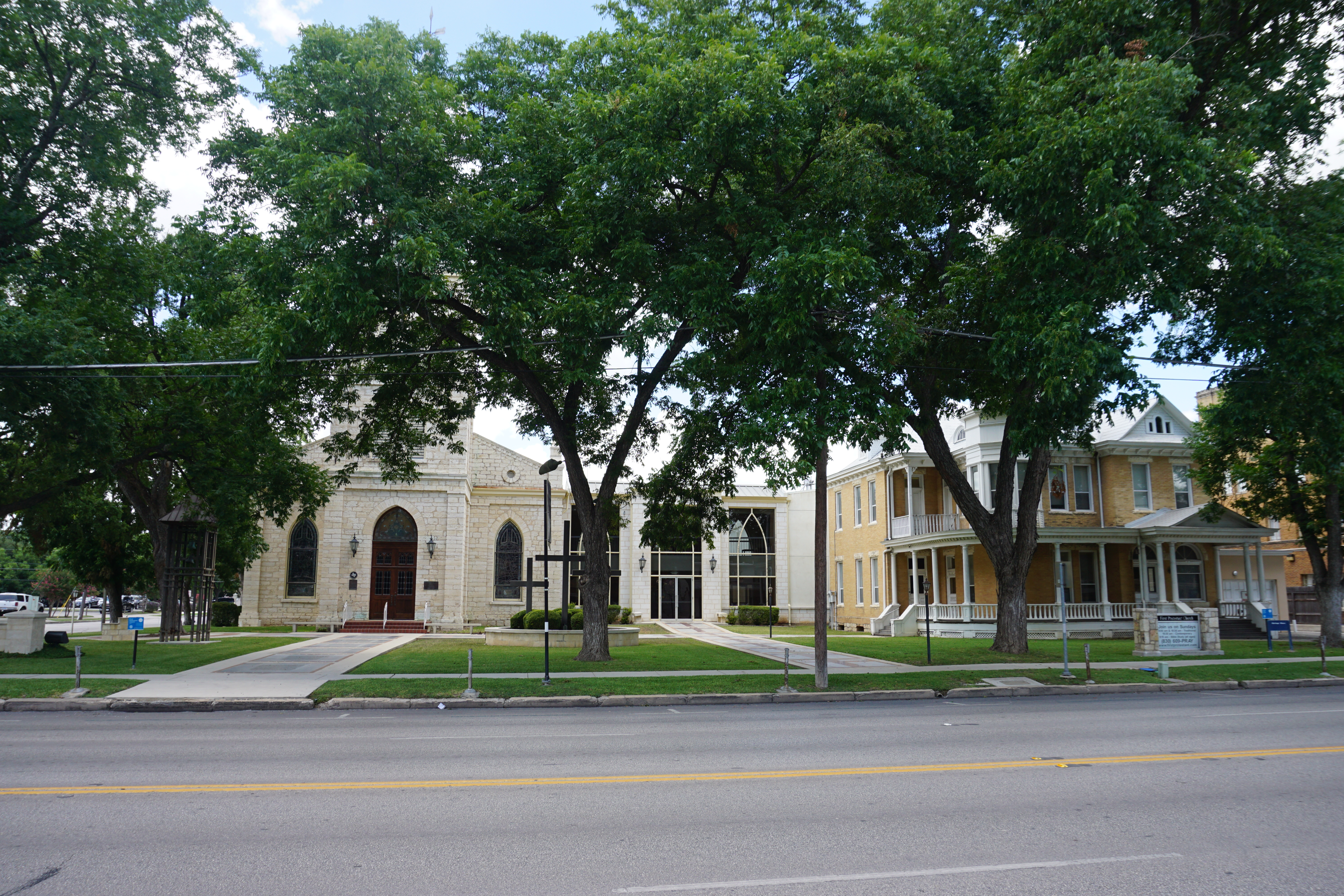
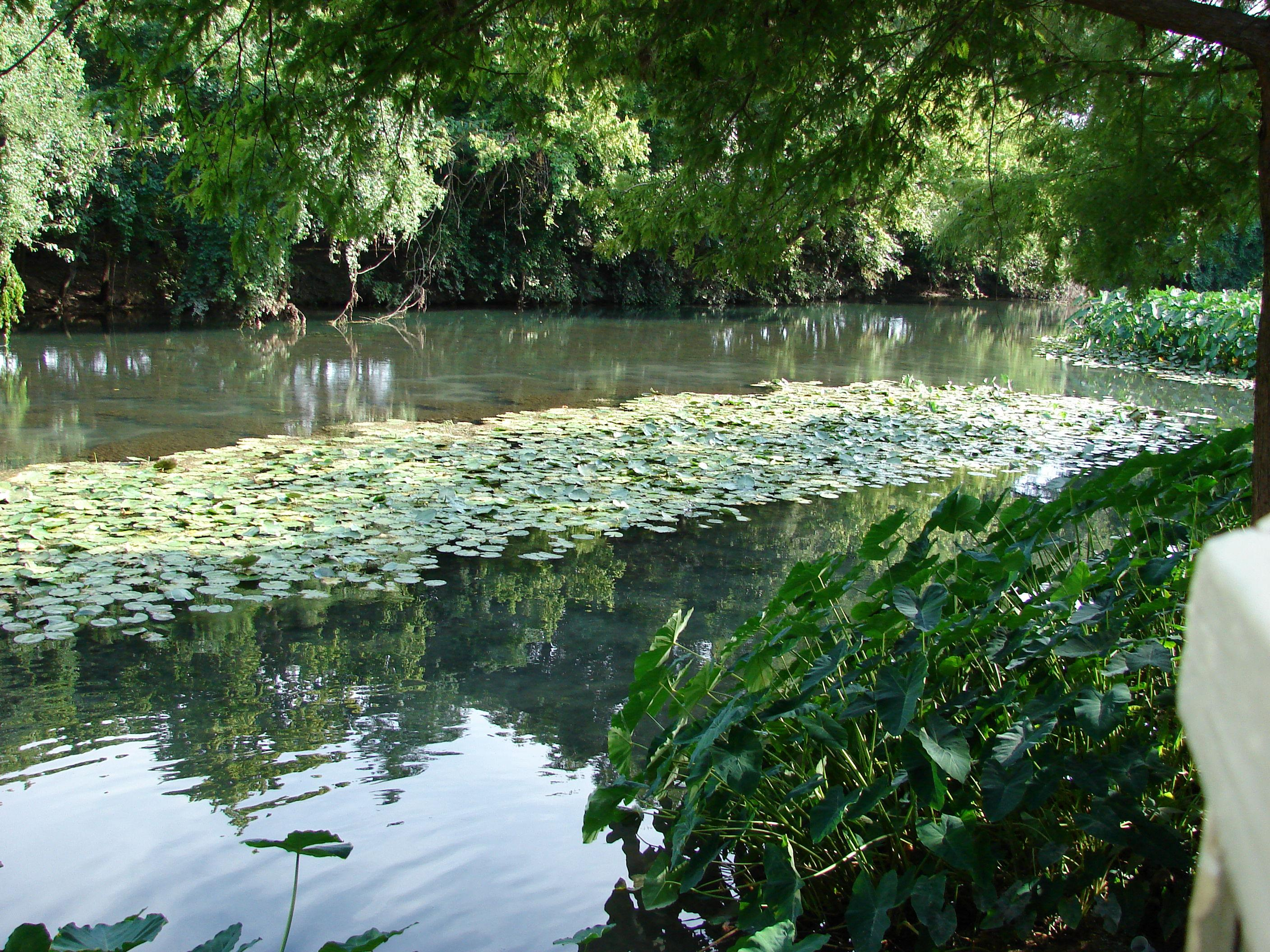
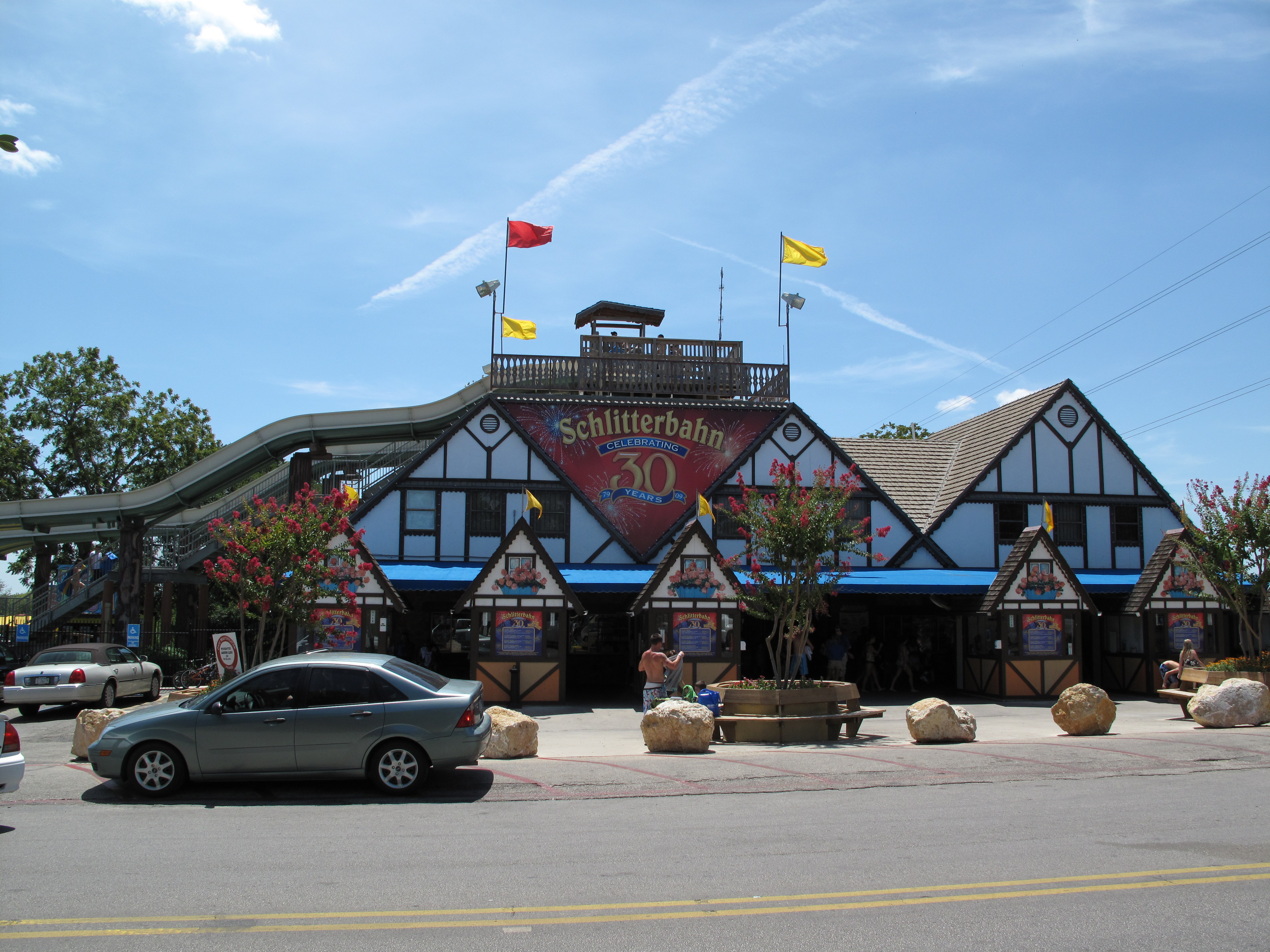
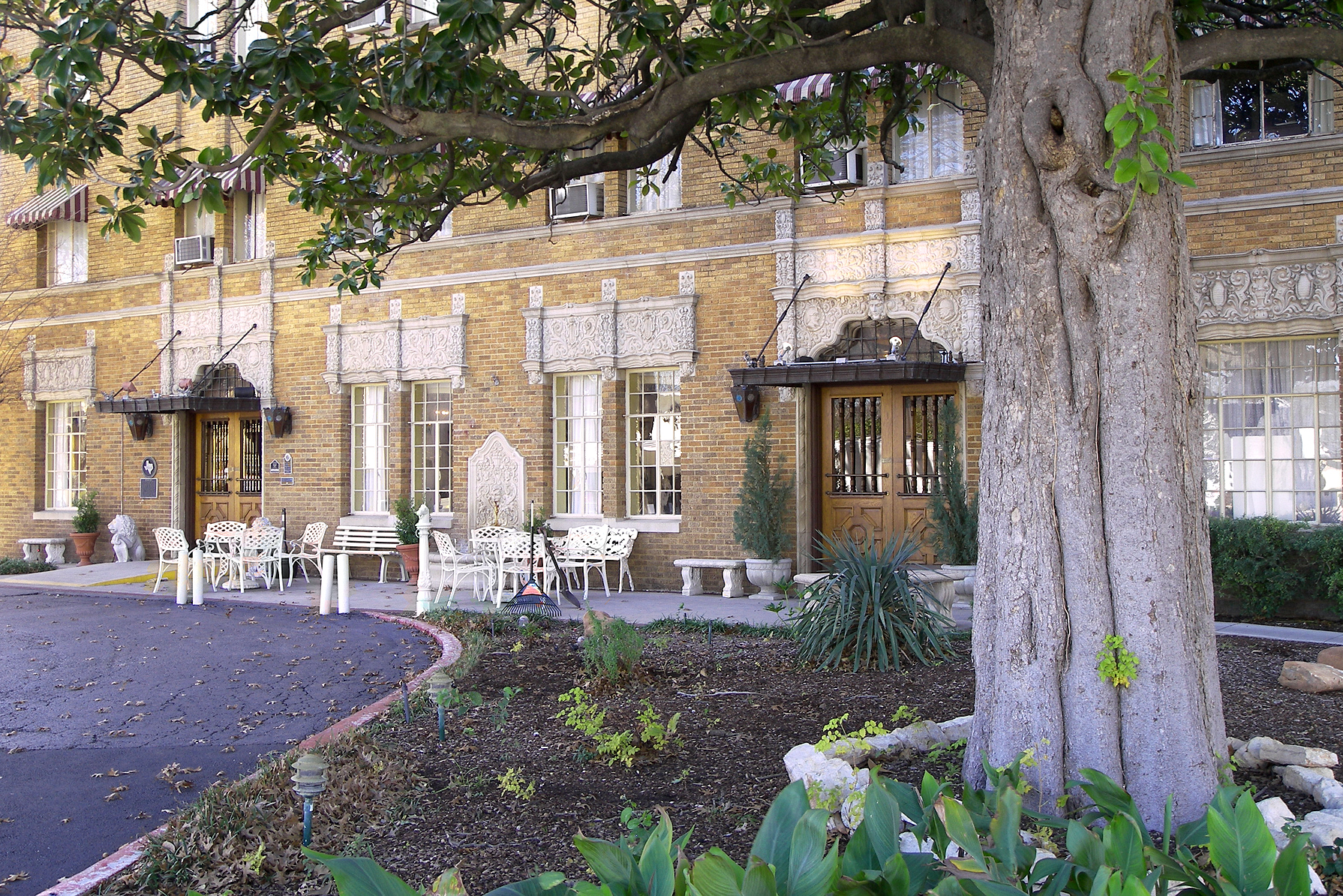
- Guadalupe River August Dietz Cottage First Protestant Church Comal River Schlitterbahn Hotel Faust

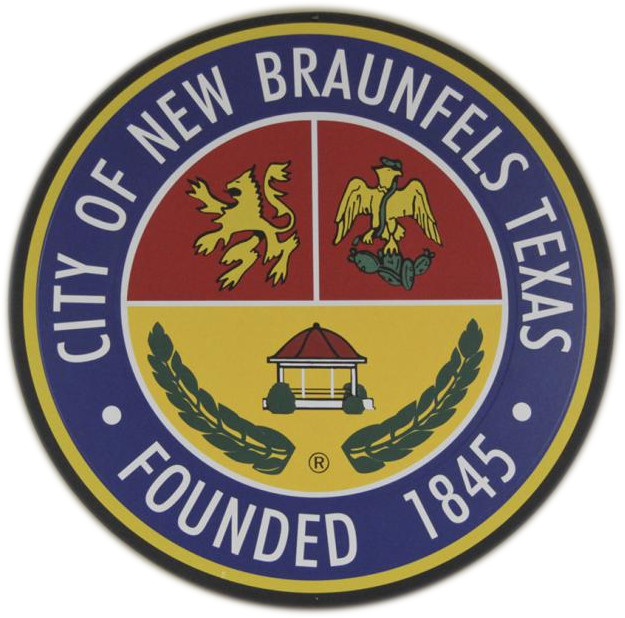
- Seal Logo of New Braunfels
- Motto: In Neu Braunfels ist das leben schöne (In New Braunfels, life is beautiful)
- Location of New Braunfels in Texas

- Location in the state of Texas Location in the United States
- Coordinates: 29°42′11″N 98°07′29″W
- Country: United States
- State: Texas
- Counties: Comal, Guadalupe
- Founded: 1845

Government
  - Type: Council-Manager

Area
  - Total: 45.57 sq mi (118.02 km^{2})
  - Land: 45.18 sq mi (117.01 km^{2})
  - Water: 0.39 sq mi (1.00 km^{2})
- Elevation: 620 ft (190 m)

Population (2020)
  - Total: 90,403
  - Estimate (2025): 122,492
  - Density: 2,435.0/sq mi (940.16/km^{2})
- Time zone: UTC−6 (Central)
  - Summer (DST): UTC−5 (CDT)
- ZIP Codes: 78130–78133
- Area code: 830
- FIPS code: 48-50820
- GNIS feature ID: 2411228
- Website: newbraunfels.gov

New Braunfels (/ˈbrɔːnfəlz/ BRAWN-fəlz) is a city in Comal and Guadalupe counties in the U.S. state of Texas. It is the county seat of Comal County. The city covers 44.9 square miles (116 km^{2}) and had a population of 90,403 as of the 2020 Census. A suburb just north of San Antonio, and part of the Greater San Antonio metropolitan area, it was the third-fastest-growing city in the United States from 2010 to 2020. As of 2025, the U.S. Census Bureau estimates its population at 122,492.

New Braunfels is known for its German Texan heritage.

== History ==
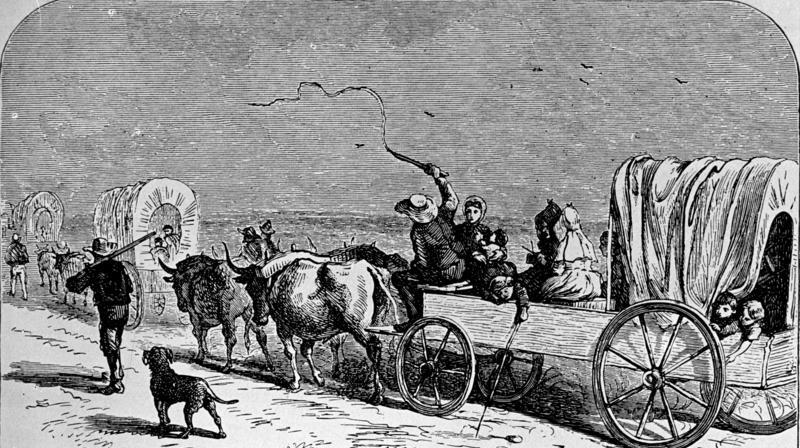
German immigrants on the way to New Braunfels (1844)

New Braunfels was established in 1845 by Prince Carl of Solms-Braunfels, Commissioner General of the Mainzer Adelsverein, also known as the Noblemen's Society. Prince Carl named the settlement in honor of his home of Solms-Braunfels, Germany.

The Adelsverein organized hundreds of people in Germany to settle in Texas. Immigrants from Germany began arriving at Galveston in July 1844. Most then traveled by ship to Indianola in December 1844, and began the overland journey to the Fisher-Miller land grant purchased by Prince Carl. At the urging of John Coffee Hays, who realized the settlers would not have time to build homes and plant crops further inland before winter, and as the German settlers were traveling inland along the Guadalupe River, they stopped near the Comal Springs. Prince Carl bought two leagues of land from Rafael Garza and Maria Antonio Veramendi Garza for $1,111.00.

The land was located northeast of San Antonio on El Camino Real de los Tejas and had the strong freshwater Comal Springs, known as Las Fontanas, when the Germans arrived. It was about halfway between Indianola and the lower portions of the Fisher-Miller land grant. The first settlers forded the Guadalupe River on Good Friday, March 21, 1845, near the present-day Faust Street bridge.

As the spring of 1845 progressed, the settlers built the "Zinkenburg", a fort named for Adelsverein civil engineer Nicolaus Zink, divided the land, and began building homes and planting crops. Prince Carl would also lay the cornerstone for the Sophienburg, a permanent fort and center for the immigrant association.

In 1844, Prince Carl was so disillusioned with the logistics of the colonization that he asked the Verein to remove him as commissioner-general and appoint a successor. When John O. Meusebach arrived, the finances were in disarray, due in part to Prince Carl's lack of business experience and his refusal to keep financial records. To a larger degree, the financial situation happened because the Adelsverein was an organization of noblemen with no practical backgrounds at running businesses. They were on the other side of the world and did not witness the situation with which both Prince Carl and Meusebach were dealing. Henry Francis Fisher had not supplied transport and supplies for which the Verein advanced money to him. Meusebach found Prince Carl in Galveston trying to return to Germany, detained by authorities for unpaid bills. Meusebach made good on the debts, so Prince Carl could depart.

Meusebach discovered that Prince Carl's choice of the inadequate Carlshafen (Indianola) as a port of entry, as well as the isolated route to New Braunfels, was deliberately chosen to keep the Germans from interacting with any Americans. According to Nicolaus Zink, Prince Carl had planned to establish a German feudal state by secretly bringing in immigrants and placing them in military fortresses. Meusebach, who had renounced his own title of nobility, took a different approach and invited Americans to settle in the Vereins territory.

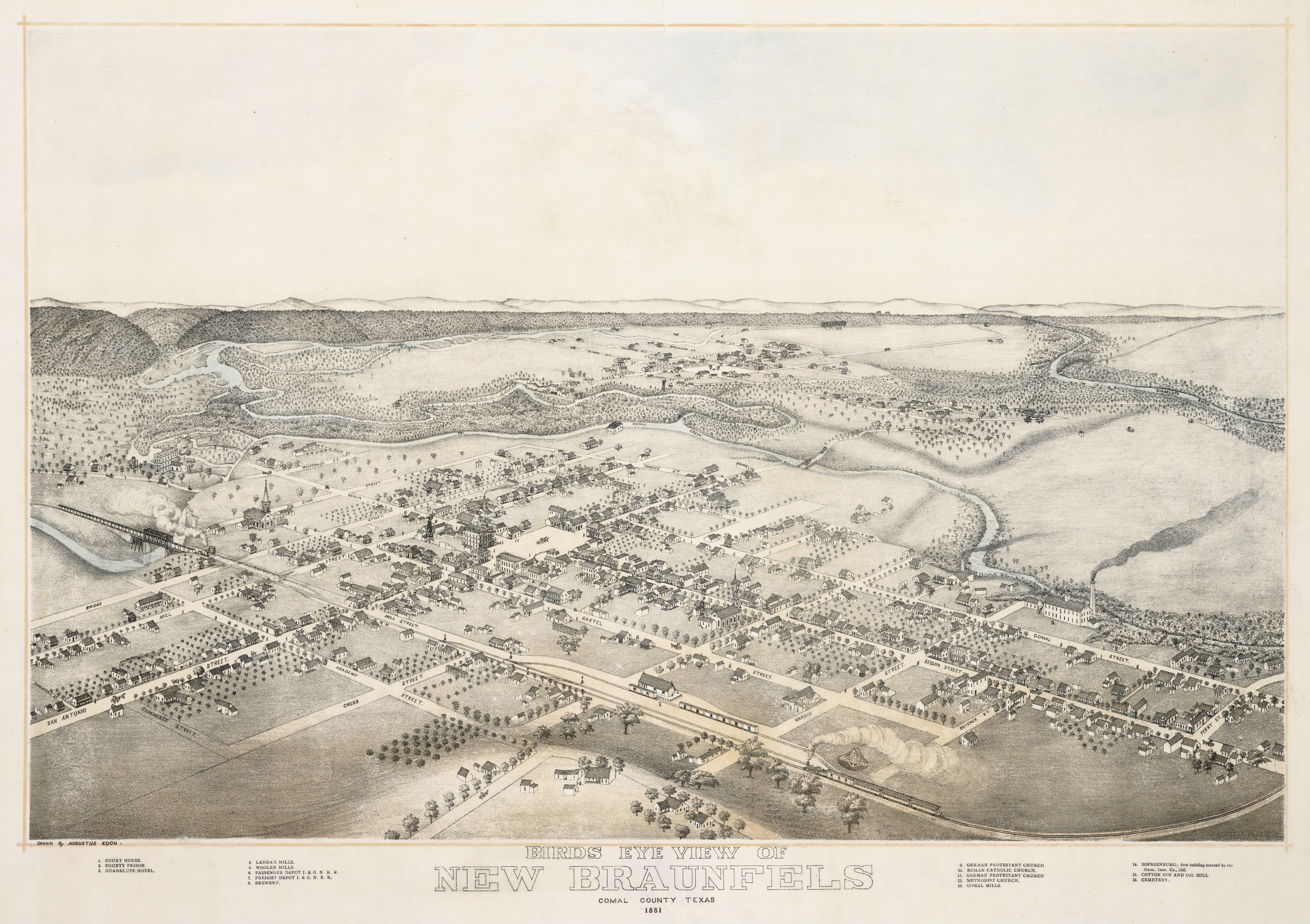
Old map (1881)

Prince Carl, being an officer of the Imperial Army of Austria, had kept a uniformed military unit at the ready in Indianola. Meusebach converted the military unit to a more needed work detail. A finance and business structure for the colony was put in place by Meusebach. He also provided for adequate food and shelter for the colonists. On August 11, 1845, Hermann Friedrich Seele became the first teacher for the German-English school in New Braunfels. Meusebach established friendly relations with a local tribe of Waco Indians. Upon seeing his reddish-blonde hair, they called him Ma-be-quo-si-to-mu, "Chief with the burning hair of the head".

In May 1846, Meusebach received a letter from Count Castell informing him 4,304 emigrants were on their way to Texas. With no funds and no new settlements, the mass of emigrants was stalled at Carlshafen. Meusebach's requests to the Verein for more money, and his warnings of pending bankruptcy for the Verein, brought no results. As a last resort, Meusebach instructed D.H. Klaener to publish the plight in the German news media. Embarrassed by the publicity, the Verein established a $60,000 letter of credit. The amount was not adequate for sustaining the total number of German emigrants in Texas, but Castell also sent Philip Cappes as special commissioner to observe the situation. Cappes had also been instructed by Castell to observe Meusebach and to secretly report back every detail. By the time Cappes departed in March 1847, he recommended another $200,000 be advanced.

Cappes invited Henry Francis Fisher to New Braunfels, in spite of Fisher not being entirely trustworthy to the Verein. As of February 11, 1845, Fisher had been involved in coercing newly arrived immigrants to sign documents stating their intent to depart from the Verein and align with Fisher's friend Friedrich Schubbert, also known as Friedrich Strubberg.

Cappes was not in town when Meusebach was breakfast host to Fisher on December 31, 1846. Posters had mysteriously appeared about town maligning Meusebach, saying "Curses upon Meusebach the slave driver", and inciting colonists to free themselves from his "tyranny". A group led by Rudolph Iwonski pushed their way into Meusebach's home, and colonist C. Herber brandished a whip. Herber was an alleged counterfeiter to whom Count Castell had awarded asylum. Meusebach and Herber shared a dislike of one another.

The colonists' list of demands included Meusebach resigning as commissioner-general and turning the colonization over to Fisher. Meusebach kept his composure, but the group became so heated, they yelled, "Hang him!" When the estimated 120 men dispersed, Fisher was nowhere to be found. The same evening, a different group of individuals assembled and pledged to stand by Meusebach, the next day passing resolutions condemning the actions of the mob. Meusebach himself had considered leaving Texas as early as November 1845, when he wrote to Count Castell and announced his intention to resign and return to Germany. Meusebach did not feel the Adelsverein was organized enough to achieve its goals. After the mob visit in New Braunfels, he again submitted his resignation to accompany a financial report to Castell on January 23, 1847.

Meusebach had arranged with the Torrey Brothers for transporting the emigrants inland, but the United States hired the Torrey Brothers for use in the Mexican–American War.

Meusebach stabilized the community's finances, and encouraged the settlers to establish additional neighboring communities. The largest of these secondary settlements was Fredericksburg, 80 miles (130 km) to the northwest of New Braunfels.

New Braunfels thrived, and by 1850, it was the fourth-largest city in Texas, with 1,723 people, following only Galveston, San Antonio, and Houston in population. In 1852, the Zeitung newspaper was established, edited by German Texan botanist Ferdinand Lindheimer. The newspaper continues to publish under its current name, the Herald-Zeitung.

== Geography ==
New Braunfels is located in southeastern Comal County. The city is 32 miles (51 km) northeast of Downtown San Antonio, 19 miles (31 km) southwest of San Marcos, and 48 miles (77 km) southwest of Austin.

According to the United States Census Bureau, New Braunfels has a total area of 44.9 square miles (116.4 km^{2}), of which 0.5 sq mi (1.3 km^{2}), or 0.91%, is covered by water. The city is situated along the Balcones Fault, where the Texas Hill Country meets rolling prairie land. Along the fault in the city, a string of artesian springs known as Comal Springs gives rise to the Comal River, which is known as one of the shortest rivers in the world, as it winds 3 miles (5 km) through the city before meeting the Guadalupe River.

=== Gruene ===
Gruene Historical District is located within the city limits of New Braunfels. Founded by the sons of settlers Ernst and Antoinette Gruene, the community had a bank, post office, school, general store, lumberyard, gristmill, dance hall, and cotton gin. It also had access to two railways for shipping cotton bales. Its most famous attribute was the dance hall, a family activity in those days. Due to the failure of the cotton crop from boll weevils, and the failure of the banks after 1929, commercial activity slowed to a crawl. This village is now a Nationally Registered Historic District where one can dine in the ruins of the original gristmill or enjoy live music at Gruene Hall.

=== Climate ===
New Braunfels experiences a humid subtropical climate, with hot, humid summers and generally mild winters. Temperatures range from 83 °F (27.8 °C) in the summer to 49 °F (9.4 °C) during winter.

The city falls in USDA hardiness zones 8b (15 °F to 20 °F) and 9a (20 °F to 25 °F). New Braunfels and San Antonio, 32 miles (51 km) to the southwest, are some of the most flood-prone regions in North America. The October 1998 Central Texas floods were among the costliest floods in United States history, resulting in $750 million in damage and 32 deaths. In 2002, from June 30 to July 7, 35 in (890 mm) of rain fell in the area, resulting in widespread flooding and 12 fatalities.

In New Braunfels, July and August tie for the average warmest months, with an average high of 95 °F (35 °C). May, June, and October receive far more precipitation than the rest of the year. The average annual precipitation has been 35.74 inches (908 mm).

Climate data for New Braunfels, Texas
| Month | Jan | Feb | Mar | Apr | May | Jun | Jul | Aug | Sep | Oct | Nov | Dec | Year |
|---|---|---|---|---|---|---|---|---|---|---|---|---|---|
| Record high °F (°C) | 89 (32) | 98 (37) | 100 (38) | 105 (41) | 103 (39) | 110 (43) | 110 (43) | 110 (43) | 112 (44) | 100 (38) | 94 (34) | 91 (33) | 112 (44) |
| Mean daily maximum °F (°C) | 62 (17) | 67 (19) | 74 (23) | 80 (27) | 86 (30) | 91 (33) | 95 (35) | 95 (35) | 90 (32) | 82 (28) | 71 (22) | 64 (18) | 80 (27) |
| Daily mean °F (°C) | 49 (9) | 53 (12) | 60 (16) | 66 (19) | 74 (23) | 80 (27) | 83 (28) | 83 (28) | 78 (26) | 69 (21) | 59 (15) | 51 (11) | 67 (20) |
| Mean daily minimum °F (°C) | 37 (3) | 41 (5) | 46 (8) | 53 (12) | 62 (17) | 68 (20) | 71 (22) | 70 (21) | 65 (18) | 55 (13) | 46 (8) | 39 (4) | 54 (13) |
| Record low °F (°C) | 2 (−17) | 8 (−13) | 17 (−8) | 29 (−2) | 37 (3) | 46 (8) | 59 (15) | 58 (14) | 43 (6) | 24 (−4) | 18 (−8) | 2 (−17) | 2 (−17) |
| Average precipitation inches (mm) | 1.88 (48) | 1.98 (50) | 2.04 (52) | 2.72 (69) | 5.01 (127) | 4.81 (122) | 1.99 (51) | 2.32 (59) | 3.46 (88) | 4.38 (111) | 2.71 (69) | 2.44 (62) | 35.74 (908) |
Source: The Weather Channel

== Demographics ==
Historical population
| Census | Pop. | Note | %± |
|---|---|---|---|
| 1850 | 1,298 | | — |
| 1860 | 1,740 | | 34.1% |
| 1870 | 2,261 | | 29.9% |
| 1880 | 1,938 | | −14.3% |
| 1890 | 1,608 | | −17.0% |
| 1900 | 2,097 | | 30.4% |
| 1910 | 3,165 | | 50.9% |
| 1920 | 3,590 | | 13.4% |
| 1930 | 6,242 | | 73.9% |
| 1940 | 6,976 | | 11.8% |
| 1950 | 12,210 | | 75.0% |
| 1960 | 15,631 | | 28.0% |
| 1970 | 17,859 | | 14.3% |
| 1980 | 22,402 | | 25.4% |
| 1990 | 27,334 | | 22.0% |
| 2000 | 36,494 | | 33.5% |
| 2010 | 57,740 | | 58.2% |
| 2020 | 90,403 | | 56.6% |
| 2025 (est.) | 122,492 | | 35.5% |
U.S. Decennial Census

As of the 2020 census, New Braunfels had a population of 90,403. The median age was 36.4 years; 24.6% of residents were under 18 and 15.7% were 65 or older. For every 100 females, there were 93.5 males, and for every 100 females 18 and over, there were 90.3 males 18 and over.

Almost all of the residents lived in urban areas, while 0.5% lived in rural areas.

Of the 34,064 households in New Braunfels, 34.5% had children under 18 living in them, 51.2% were married-couple households, 15.9% were households with a male householder and no spouse or partner present, and 25.7% were households with a female householder and no spouse or partner present. About 25.1% of all households were made up of individuals, and 10.3% had someone living alone who was 65 or older.

The city had 37,426 housing units, of which 9.0% were vacant. The homeowner vacancy rate was 2.0% and the rental vacancy rate was 9.2%.

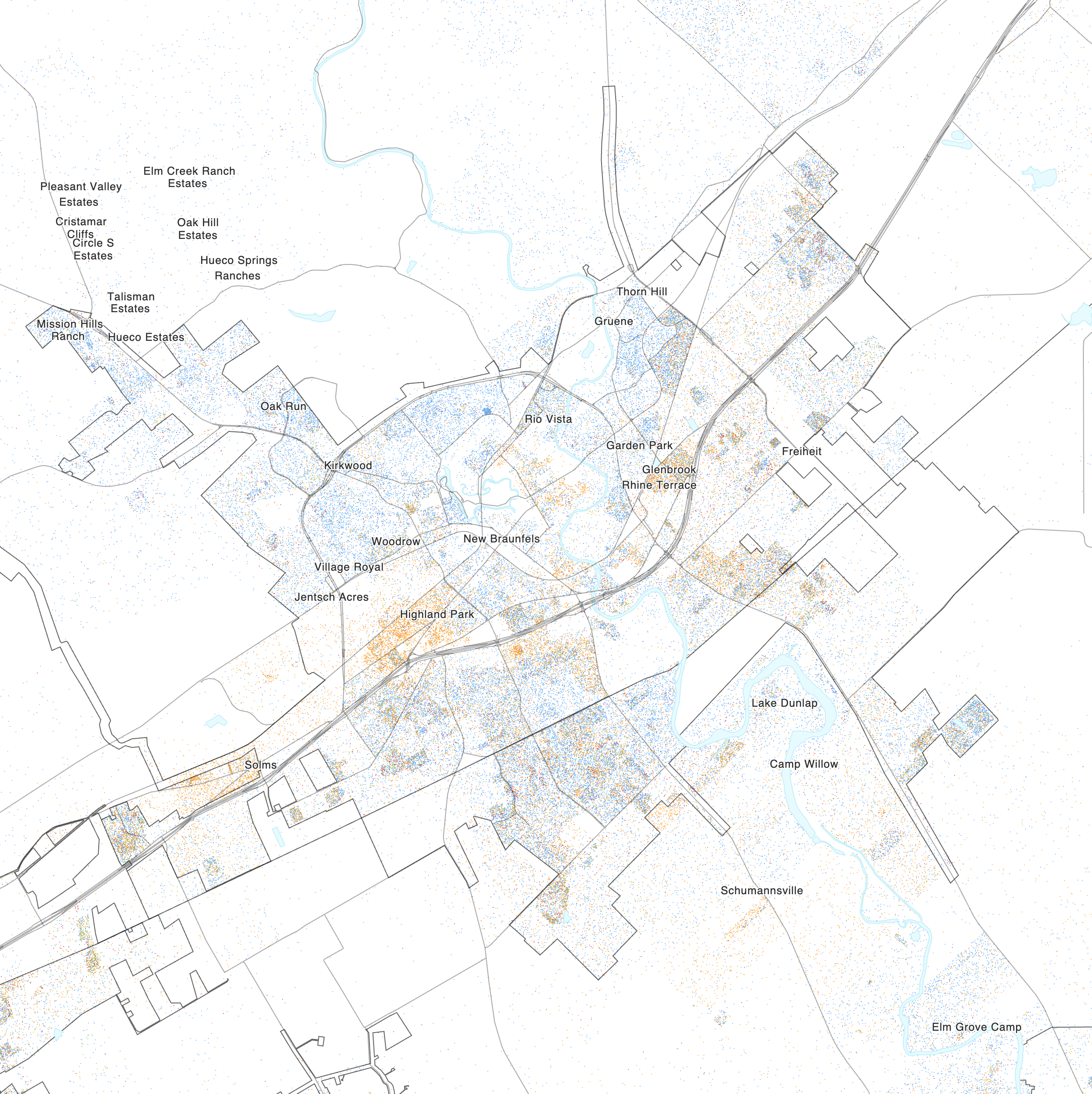
Map of racial distribution in New Braunfels, 2020 U.S. census. Each dot is one person: ⬤ White ⬤ Black ⬤ Asian ⬤ Hispanic ⬤ Multiracial ⬤ Native American/Other

=== Racial and ethnic composition ===
New Braunfels, Texas – Racial and ethnic composition Note: the US Census treats Hispanic/Latino as an ethnic category. This table excludes Latinos from the racial categories and assigns them to a separate category. Hispanics/Latinos may be of any race.
| Race / Ethnicity (NH = Non-Hispanic) | Pop 2000 | Pop 2010 | Pop 2020 | % 2000 | % 2010 | % 2020 |
|---|---|---|---|---|---|---|
| White alone (NH) | 22,793 | 35,132 | 51,801 | 62.46% | 60.85% | 57.30% |
| Black or African American alone (NH) | 468 | 990 | 2,371 | 1.28% | 1.71% | 2.62% |
| Native American or Alaska Native alone (NH) | 113 | 175 | 233 | 0.31% | 0.30% | 0.26% |
| Asian alone (NH) | 206 | 570 | 1,261 | 0.56% | 0.99% | 1.39% |
| Native Hawaiian or Pacific Islander alone (NH) | 9 | 21 | 131 | 0.02% | 0.04% | 0.14% |
| Other race alone (NH) | 35 | 48 | 334 | 0.10% | 0.08% | 0.37% |
| Multiracial (NH) | 271 | 574 | 3,007 | 0.74% | 0.99% | 3.33% |
| Hispanics or Latinos (any race) | 12,599 | 20,230 | 31,265 | 34.52% | 35.04% | 34.58% |
| Total | 36,494 | 57,740 | 90,403 | 100.00% | 100.00% | 100.00% |

=== 2015 estimate ===
For 2015, New Braunfels was named the U.S.'s second-fastest-growing city with a population of 50,000 or more, according to estimates by the U.S. Census Bureau.

=== 2019 American Community Survey ===
The 2019 American Community Survey estimated a population density of 1,316.1 people per square mile.

The survey also estimated 62.2% of housing units were owner-occupied and the median selected monthly owner costs were $1,599 with a mortgage, and $509 without a mortgage. The city had a median gross rent of $1,183 and the 28,835 households had an average of 2.72 persons in them. In 2019, the median household income was $71,044 and the per capita income was $33,405; an estimated 8.6% of New Braunfels' population lived at or below the poverty line.

=== 2000 census ===
At the census of 2000, 36,494 people, 13,558 households, and 9,599 families resided in the city. The population density was 1,247.7 inhabitants per square mile (481.7/km^{2}). The 14,896 housing units averaged 509.3 per square mile (196.6/km^{2}). The racial makeup of the city was 84.30% White, 1.37% African American, 0.55% Native American, 0.58% Asian, 0.03% Pacific Islander, 10.93% from other races, and 2.24% from two or more races. Hispanics or Latinos of any race were 34.52% of the population.

Of the 13,558 households at the 2000 census, 33.4% had children under 18 living with them, 55.4% were married couples living together, 11.5% had a female householder with no husband present, and 29.2% were not families. About 24.8% of all households were made up of individuals, and 12.0% had someone living alone who was 65 or older. The average household size was 2.60, and the average family size was 3.11.

The median income in the city for a household was $40,078 and for a family was $46,726. Males had a median income of $31,140 versus $23,235 for females. The per capita income for the city was $18,548. About 9.0% of families and 10.9% of the population were below the poverty line, including 14.9% of those under 18 and 9.7% of those 65 or over.

== Economy ==
Companies based in New Braunfels include Rush Enterprises and Schlitterbahn. The top employers in the area are:

| Rank | Employer | Employees 2021 | Employees 2012 |
|---|---|---|---|
| 1 | Comal Independent School District | 3,105 | 2,300 |
| 2 | Schlitterbahn | 2,300 (Note: 2020 data) | 1,683 |
| 3 | Walmart Distribution Center | 1,379 | 1,077 |
| 4 | TaskUs | 1,180 | - |
| 5 | New Braunfels Independent School District | 1,131 | 945 |
| 6 | City of New Braunfels | 960 | 511 |
| 7 | Hunter Industries-Colorado Materials | 788 | 525 |
| 8 | Comal County | 760 | 616 |
| 9 | Sysco | 670 | - |
| 10 | HD Supply | 477 | 525 |
| 11 | Resolute Health | 476 | - |
| - | The Scooter Store | - | 1,400 |
| - | Christus Santa Rosa Hospital-New Braunfels | - | 576 |

== Education ==
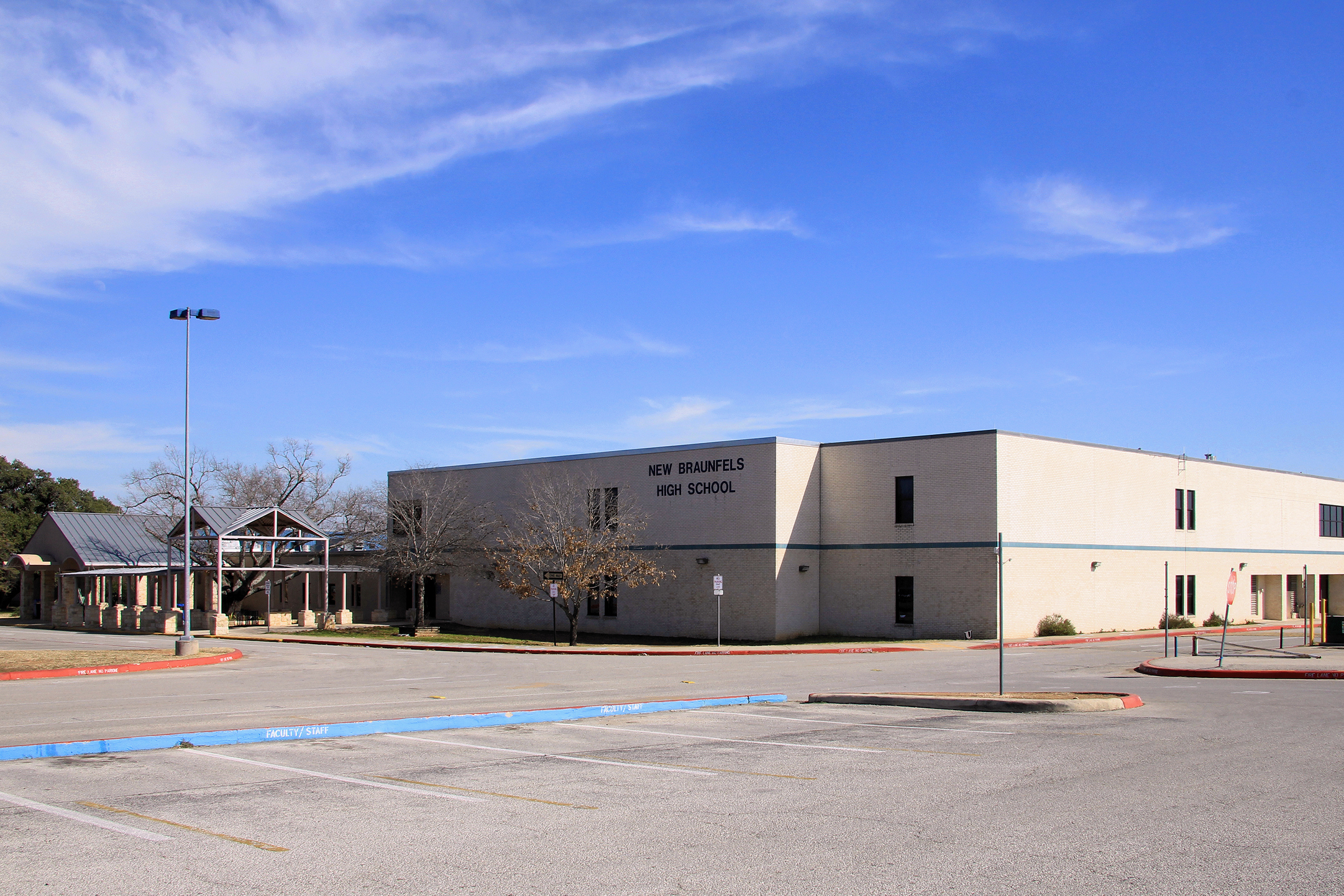
New Braunfels High School

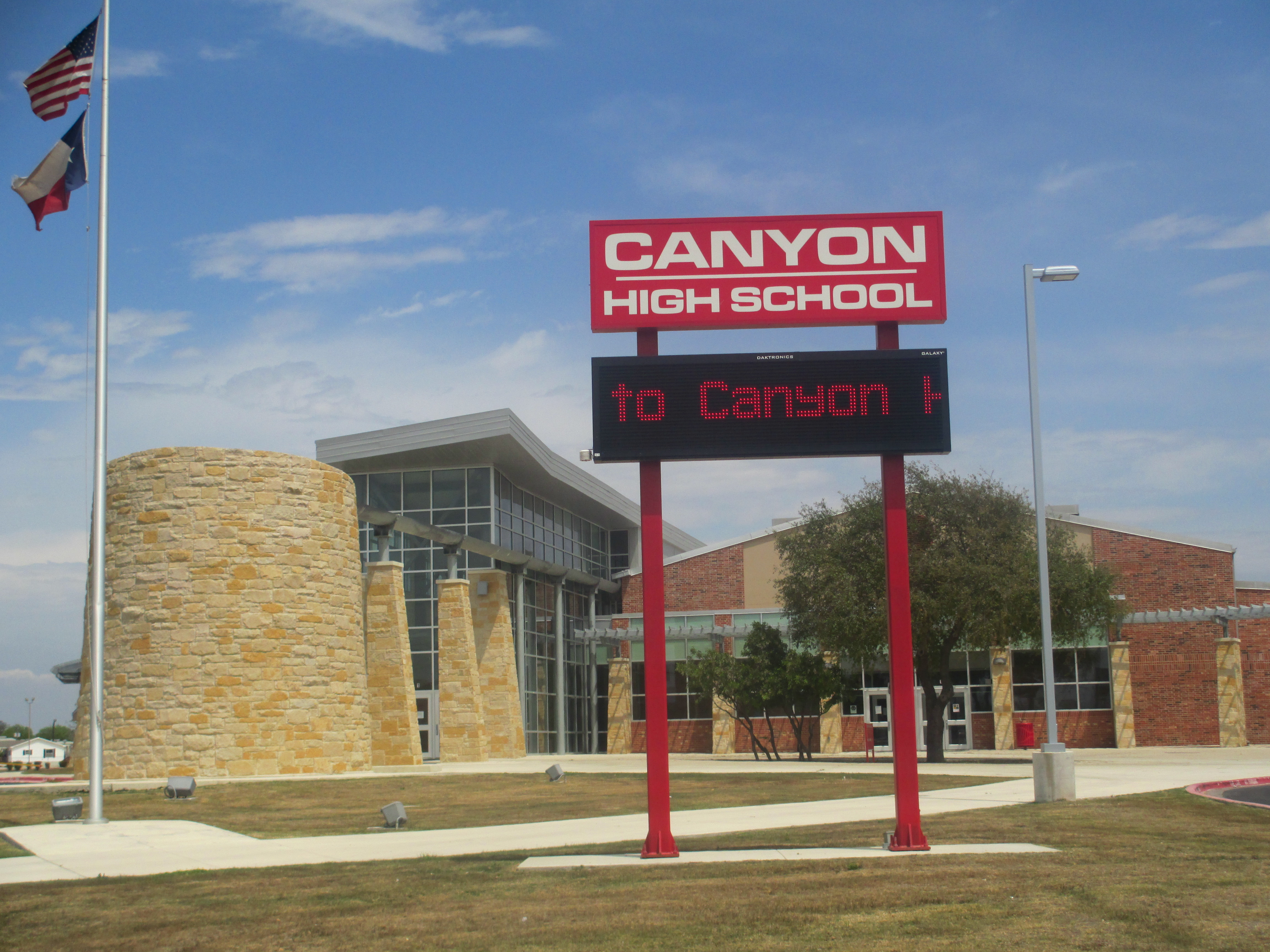
Canyon High School

Most of the city is served by the New Braunfels Independent School District and the Comal Independent School District in separate places. Small portions in Guadalupe County are within the Marion Independent School District and the Navarro Independent School District.

Three traditional public high schools are located within city limits. The public high schools are New Braunfels High School, Canyon High School, Long Creek High School, and Alamo Colleges-Memorial Early College High School.

NBISD operates several schools in New Braunfels.

- Carl Schurz, County Line Road, Klein Road, Lamar, Memorial, Seele, Veramendi, Voss Farms, and Walnut Springs elementary schools
- New Braunfels Middle and Oak Run Middle
- Long Creek High and New Braunfels High

CISD schools with attendance boundaries coinciding with New Braunfels are:

- Clear Spring, Comal Creek, Goodwin Frazier, Freiheit, Hoffmann Lane, Morningside, Oak Creek, Farias Spitzer, and Mayfair
- Canyon, Church Hill, and Danville middle schools
- Canyon High and Davenport High School

Private high schools are New Braunfels Christian Academy, a K–12 institution, and the Calvary Baptist Academy.

== Recreation and tourism ==
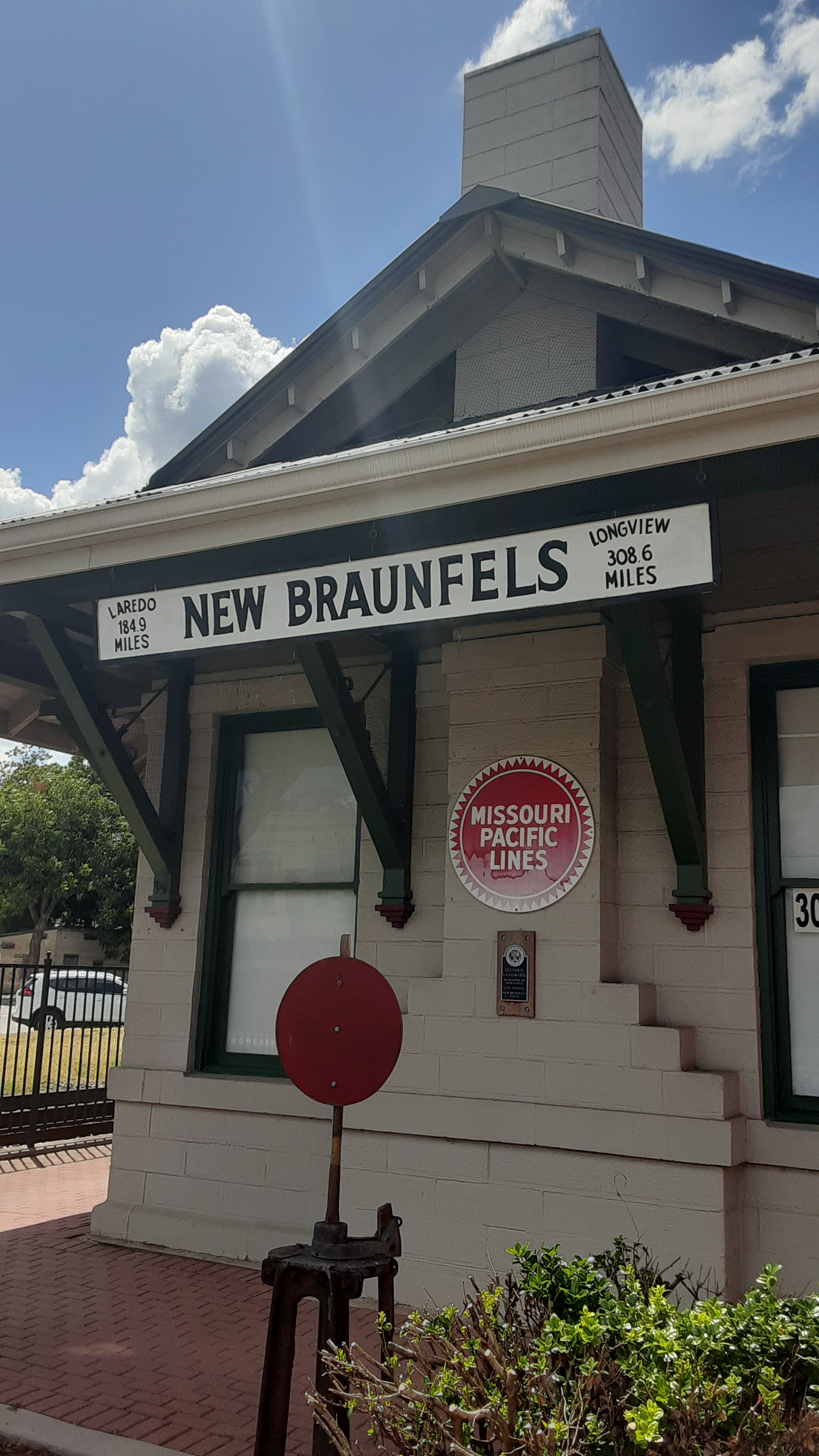
New Braunfels Railroad Museum

The town holds "Wurstfest", a German-style sausage festival, every November, drawing on the city's strong German heritage. Every December, the town celebrates Wassailfest in the historic downtown.

New Braunfels draws a large number of tourists, particularly in the summer because of the cold-spring rivers that run through the city. Many generations of families and college students return every summer to tube for miles down the Guadalupe and Comal rivers. New Braunfels is the site of the original water park, the Schlitterbahn WaterPark Resort. The Ernest Eikel Skate Park attracts many skate board enthusiasts.

New Braunfels also hosts a Buc-ee's gas station, which until 2023 was the largest gas station in the world.

The 10,000-capacity Unicorn Stadium is the largest sports venue by capacity in New Braunfels. It opened in 1927 and it is used mostly for American football and soccer. The venue also has an athletics track.

New Braunfels is home to the Museum of Texas Handmade Furniture, Sophienburg Museum and Archives, McKenna Children's Museum, and Alamo Classic Car Museum.

== Media communications ==
The newspaper Herald Zeitung was originally two newspapers: The Herald (published in English) and The Zeitung, which means "newspaper", (published in German) until 1967.

The other newspaper publisher serving the city of New Braunfels is the TX Citizen, formerly the NB citizen has been discontinued.

In radio, two stations broadcast from New Braunfels, KGNB 1420 AM/ 103.1 FM and KNBT 92.1 FM, notable for its Americana music format.

== Notable people ==
- Joe Aramendia, racing driver
- John Aramendia, racing driver
- Louis Beam, American white supremacist and neo-fascist
- Lance Berkman, six-time Major League Baseball (MLB) All-Star, attended Canyon High School in New Braunfels.
- Donna Campbell, Republican state senator from New Braunfels since 2013
- Parker Chase, American professional racing driver
- Sherman Corbett, former MLB pitcher for the California Angels.
- Riley Dickinson, American professional racing driver
- Charles Duke, Apollo Lunar Module pilot on the Apollo 16 Moon landing mission
- Abby Dunkin, American 3.5 point wheelchair basketball player
- Craig Jordan, pioneer in the use of Tamoxifen as an adjuvant therapy for breast cancer
- Ray Katt, MLB player
- Kliff Kingsbury, former head coach of NFL's Arizona Cardinals
- Robert Krueger, Democrat, former U.S. representative and former interim (appointed) U.S. senator
- Ferdinand Lindheimer, known as the father of Texas botany
- Doug Miller, Republican, former U.S. representative from the 73rd district
- Bryce Miller, American MLB starting pitcher for the Seattle Mariners
- Leigh Nash, member of the band Sixpence None the Richer
- George E. Nowotny, Republican member of the Arkansas House of Representatives from 1967 to 1972
- Demi Payne, American track and field athlete
- Victoria Scott, American writer of young adult fiction novels
- Matt Slocum, member of the band Sixpence None the Richer
- Jordan Westburg, American professional baseball MLB shortstop
- Dustin Ybarra, American stand-up comedian actor
- James McArthur, American MLB pitcher for the Kansas City Royals

== Notable films and television ==
- Johnny Be Good, 1988 American comedy film by Orion Pictures
- Michael, 1996 American fantasy film
- The Newton Boys, 1998 American comedy-drama film
- Adventures in Appletown
- Fear the Walking Dead, American postapocalyptic horror drama television series
- Schultze Gets the Blues, a 2003 German comedy-drama film
- The Bachelorette, American reality television
- The Daytripper, 9-time Lone Star Emmy Award-winning travel show aired on PBS
- Revolution, American postapocalyptic sci-fi-drama television series
- Spy Kids 3-D: Game Over, a 2003 American spy action-comedy film
- Lone Star Law, an American reality television series
- Walker, an American action crime drama television series

== See also ==
- List of museums in Central Texas
