= Texas State Highway 46 =

State highway in Texas

State Highway 46
- SH 46 Bus. SH 46

Route information
- Maintained by TxDOT
- Length: 71.811 mi (115.569 km)
- Existed: 1919–present

Major junctions
- West end: SH 16 near Pipe Creek
- I-10 / US 87 in Boerne; US 281 in Bulverde; I-35 in New Braunfels; I-10 / SH 130 in Seguin; US 90 in Seguin; US 90 Alt. in Seguin
- East end: SH 123 / Bus. SH 123 in Seguin

Location
- Country: United States
- State: Texas
- Counties: Bandera, Kendall, Comal, Guadalupe

Highway system
- Highways in Texas; Interstate; US; State; Former; Toll; Loops; Spurs; FM/RM; Park; Rec
← SH 45	→ SH 47

State Highway 46 (SH 46) is a 71.8-mile (115.6 km) state highway in the U.S. state of Texas that runs from SH 16 east of Bandera to the intersection of SH 123 and SH 123 Business just south of Seguin.

== History ==

SH 46 was originally designated on October 20, 1919 as a route from New Braunfels north to Johnson City. On July 13, 1925, the route had been shortened, with the section north of Spring Branch transferred to SH 108. This alignment of SH 46 only consisted of the portion from US 281 to US 81 in New Braunfels. US 81 no longer exists today in favor of I-35 and is known as a business loop of I-35. On July 16, 1928, it was extended to Seguin. On July 15, 1935, the section from New Braunfels to Seguin was cancelled. On October 26, 1967, the highway was relocated in New Braunfels to the east along the alignment of Loop 337, but still had an eastern terminus at US 81. The original alignment in New Braunfels was redesignated as Loop 453, but to be signed as a business route of SH 46. On June 21, 1990, the designation of this segment was officially changed to Business 46. On October 28, 1960, SH 46 was signed, but not designated, over Farm to Market Road 25 from I-35 to US 90 and Ranch to Market Road 475 from US 281 to SH 16. On June 30, 1961, the section of FM 25 from FM 78 to US 90 became part of the new Spur 351. On February 26, 1968, SH 46 was officially extended to the south from US 81 to I-35, replacing part of FM 25. On September 28, 1988, the highway was officially extended at both ends, extending the eastern end south replacing FM 25 from I-35 to FM 78 and then replacing part of Spur 351 from FM 78 to I-10 in Seguin. The western terminus was extended to the west replacing RM 475 from US 281 to SH 16. A portion of this route had been FM 1719 which had been combined with FM (later RM) 475 in 1951. On May 14, 1990, the highway was extended to its current alignment when it was extended south from I-10 to SH 123 replacing the remainder of Spur 351.

Spur 351 was designated on June 30, 1961 from FM 25 and FM 78 to US 90 Alt. On August 4, 1970, Spur 351 was extended south to SH 123. On September 28, 1988, the section of Spur 351 from FM 78 to I-10 was transferred to SH 46. On May 14, 1990, the remainder of Spur 351 was cancelled and mileage was transferred to SH 46.

In 2015, the Texas Department of Transportation (TxDOT) announced plans to widen SH 46 from Loop 337 to Hillcrest Drive in New Braunfels from a two lane undivided highway to a four lane divided highway. Construction started in fall 2017 and also included reconstruction of existing bridges and interchanges. Construction was completed in May 2021 at an estimated cost of $42.3 million.

== Route description ==
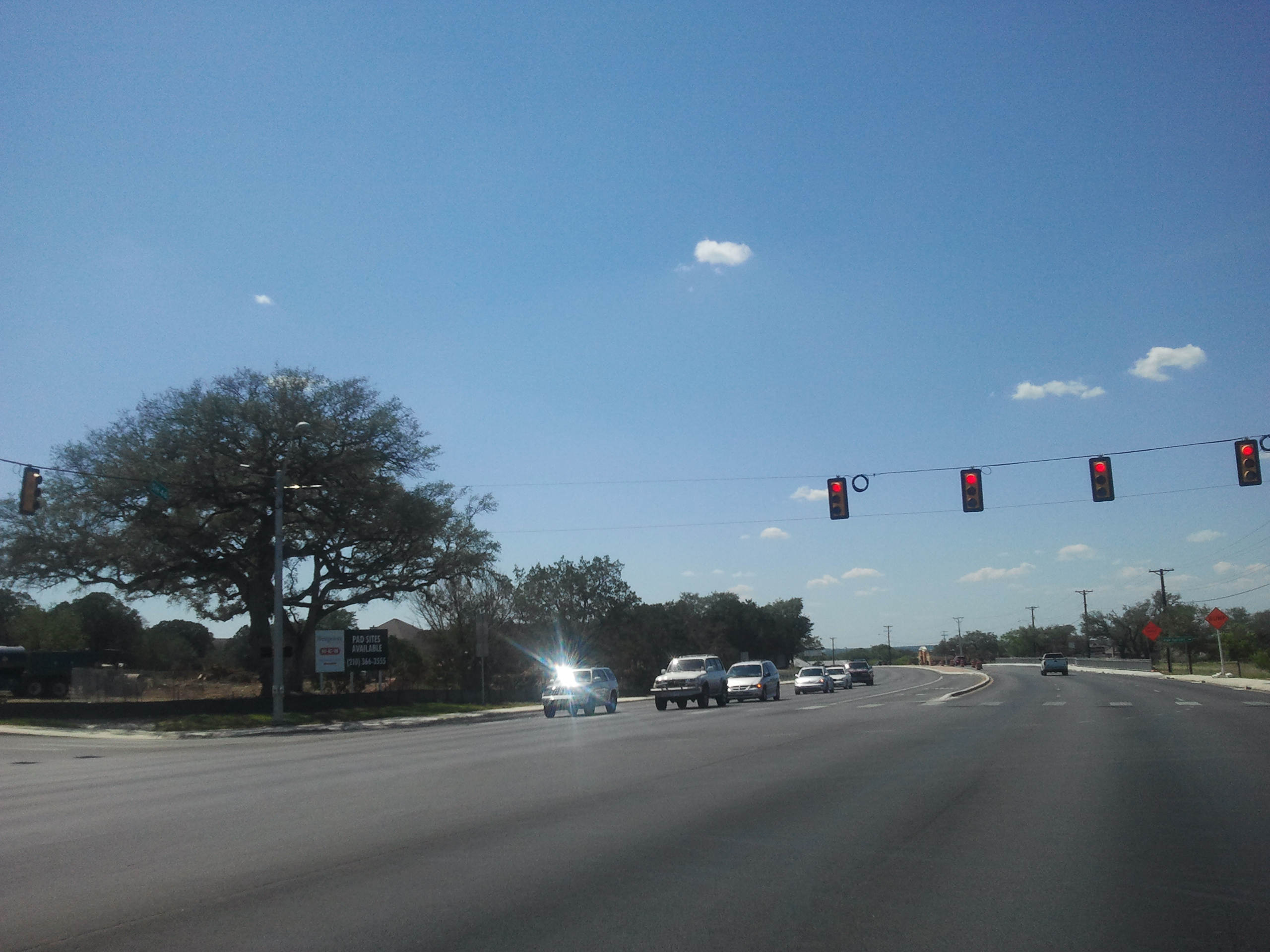
Texas State Highway 46 west of its intersection with Loop 337

SH 46 begins at its western terminus at SH 16, east of Bandera in Bandera County. The highway heads to the northeast, crossing over into Kendall County on its way to Boerne where it intersects with I-10 and US 87. SH 46 carries the street name of Bandera Road from I-10 until US 87. At US 87, there is a short break in the highway with SH 46 continuing again further north with the name River Road. SH 46 leaves the city limits of Boerne to the east and follows an east-northeast routing through rural Kendall County. An intersection with FM 3351 occurs just prior to heading into Comal County. Continuing to the east, SH 46 passes FM 2696 before coming into the city of Bulverde. In Bulverde, SH 46 intersects with US 281 at a diamond interchange, which provides access to San Antonio to the south. The highway continues to the east-southeast, passing several farm-to-market roads with FM 3159 and RM 2722 providing access to Canyon Lake. As it enters New Braunfels, Texas, it intersects and becomes concurrent with Loop 337, providing the northern and eastern arcs of the loop around New Braunfels. In New Braunfels, the highway passes over the Guadalupe River and intersects I-35. Continuing to the south-southeast, it heads towards Seguin as it passes into Guadalupe County and roughly parallels the Guadalupe River to the east. In Seguin, SH 46 passes I-10 again then intersects US 90 and U.S. Route 90 Alternate near the campus of Texas Lutheran University before ending at SH 123/Bus. SH 123 just south of Seguin.

== Junction list ==
County	Location	mi	km	Destinations	Notes
Bandera		0.0	0.0	SH 16 / Bump Gate Road – Bandera, San Antonio	Western terminus of SH 46; road continues as Bump Gate Road
Kendall	Boerne	11.0	17.7	I-10 / US 87 – Comfort, San Antonio	I-10 exit 540.
Kendall	Boerne	11.65	18.75	Bus. US 87 south (Main Street) – San Antonio	West end of US 87 Bus. overlap
Kendall	Boerne	12.3	19.8	Bus. US 87 north (Main Street) to I-10 west – Fredericksburg	East end of US 87 Bus. overlap
Kendall	Bergheim	22.5	36.2	FM 3351 to I-10 – Kendalia, Fair Oaks Ranch	
Comal		25.4	40.9	PR 31 north – Guadalupe River State Park	
Comal	Bulverde	32.75	52.71	US 281 – Johnson City, San Antonio	Interchange
Comal		37.15	59.79	FM 3159 east to FM 311 – Startzville, Canyon Lake	
Comal	Canyon Lake	38.5	62.0	FM 311 north – Startzville, Smithson Valley	
Comal		41.1	66.1	FM 3009 south (Natural Bridge Caverns Road) – Garden Ridge, Schertz	
Comal	New Braunfels	47.5	76.4	RM 2722	Interchange
Comal	New Braunfels	49.5	79.7	FM 1863 south	
Comal	New Braunfels	50.9	81.9	Bus. SH 46 east / Loop 337 south to I-35 south – New Braunfels	Interchange; west end of Loop 337 overlap
Comal	New Braunfels	53.6	86.3	River Road, Rock Street	Interchange
Comal	New Braunfels	53.67	86.37	Ranch Parkway, Gruene Road	Interchange; no westbound entrance
Comal	New Braunfels	56.0	90.1	I-35 BL / Bus. SH 46 south – Austin, San Antonio	
Comal	New Braunfels	56.25	90.53	I-35 / Loop 337 ends – Austin, San Antonio	I-35 exit 189; east end of Loop 337 overlap.
Comal	New Braunfels	56.45	90.85	FM 1101 north – Zorn	Access to New Braunfels Surgery Center
Guadalupe	Clear Springs	59.0	95.0	FM 758 east – New Braunfels Municipal Airport	
Guadalupe	Seguin	66.5	107.0	I-10 / SH 130 to FM 78 – Houston, San Antonio	I-10 exit 607.
Guadalupe	Seguin	67.15	108.07	US 90 (Kingsbury Street) – Seguin, San Antonio	
Guadalupe	Seguin	67.55	108.71	US 90 Alt. (Court Street) – Seguin, Gonzales	
Guadalupe	Seguin	69.9	112.5	FM 725 to US 90 / Bus. SH 123 – Seguin	
Guadalupe	Seguin	70.5	113.5	FM 467 – Seguin, Olmos	
Guadalupe		71.8	115.6	SH 123 / Bus. SH 123 north – Stockdale	Eastern terminus of SH 46
1.000 mi = 1.609 km; 1.000 km = 0.621 mi: Concurrency terminus; Incomplete access

== New Braunfels business route ==
Business State Highway 46
- Location: New Braunfels
- Length: 3.376 mi (5.433 km)
- Existed: June 21, 1990–present

Business State Highway 46-C (Bus SH. 46-C) is a business route of SH 46 located in New Braunfels. The highway was designated on June 21, 1990, with the mileage being transferred from Loop 453.

The highway begins at an interchange with SH 46/Loop 337 and runs in a southward direction along Walnut Avenue. Bus. SH 46-C turns towards the east after turning left onto Landa Street. Just outside of downtown, the highway merges onto Seguin Avenue and runs through the central business district of New Braunfels. Near the Comal County Courthouse, Bus. SH 46-C runs along a traffic circle, known locally as Main Plaza, where the highway intersects San Antonio Street. Bus. SH 46-C continues to run southeast along Seguin Street before ending at an intersection with BL I-35/FM 725.

Junction list

The entire route is in New Braunfels, Comal County.

mi	km	Destinations	Notes
0.0	0.0	SH 46 / Loop 337 to I-35 – Boerne	Interchange
2.2	3.5	San Antonio Street	Traffic circle
3.3	5.3	I-35 BL (Elliot Knox Boulevard) / FM 725 south (Seguin Street) – San Marcos, San Antonio	
1.000 mi = 1.609 km; 1.000 km = 0.621 mi

== See also ==
- List of state highways in Texas
