= National Register of Historic Places listings in Comal County, Texas =

Location of Comal County in Texas

This is a list of the National Register of Historic Places listings in Comal County, Texas.

This is intended to be a complete list of properties and districts listed on the National Register of Historic Places in Comal County, Texas. There are five districts and 27 individual properties listed on the National Register in the county. One property is located within a National Natural Landmark. Ten individually listed properties comprise 11 Recorded Texas Historic Landmarks including one that is also designated a State Antiquities Landmark. Two districts contain several more Recorded Texas Historic Landmarks.

This National Park Service list is complete through NPS recent listings posted August 7, 2026.

== Current listings ==
The publicly disclosed locations of National Register properties and districts may be seen in a mapping service provided.

	Name on the Register	Image	Date listed	Location	City or town	Description
1	Anhalt Hall	Anhalt Hall	July 23, 2018 (#100002697)	2390 Anhalt Rd. 29°48′50″N 98°28′44″W	Spring Branch	
2	Arnold-Rauch-Brandt Homestead	Arnold-Rauch-Brandt Homestead	July 23, 2018 (#100002698)	TX 46 W, Parcel 393224; 29°43′43″N 98°12′51″W	New Braunfels	
3	Brauntex Theater	Brauntex Theater	March 24, 2008 (#08000240)	290 W. San Antonio; 29°42′05″N 98°07′35″W	New Braunfels	
4	Andreas Breustedt House	Andreas Breustedt House	July 22, 1982 (#82004497)	1370 Church Hill Dr. 29°42′33″N 98°05′47″W	New Braunfels	Recorded Texas Historic Landmark
5	Central Fire Station	Central Fire Station	December 3, 2019 (#100004753)	169 Hill Ave. 29°42′02″N 98°07′33″W	New Braunfels	
6	Central New Braunfels Historic District		February 2, 2026 (#100012669)	Roughly bounded by S. Gilbert Avenue, Butcher Street, the southwest property lines along N. Academy Avenue, the former International and Great Northern Railroad tracks, and W. Zink Street; 29°42′10″N 98°07′28″W	New Braunfels	
7	Comal County Courthouse	Comal County Courthouse	December 12, 1976 (#76002017)	N. Sequin Ave. 29°42′12″N 98°07′29″W	New Braunfels	State Antiquities Landmark, Recorded Texas Historic Landmark
8	Comal Hotel and Klein-Kuse House	Comal Hotel and Klein-Kuse House	June 26, 1986 (#86001373)	295 E. San Antonio and 165 Market St. 29°42′17″N 98°07′25″W	New Braunfels	Recorded Texas Historic Landmarks
9	Comal Power Plant	Comal Power Plant	August 20, 2004 (#04000895)	Jct. of Landa Rd. and Landa Park Dr. 29°42′23″N 98°07′57″W	New Braunfels	
10	Comal Springs	Comal Springs	May 30, 2019 (#100003970)	Address Restricted	New Braunfels	
11	Dittlinger Family Residential Historic District		August 12, 2026 (#100013316)	372 Magazine Avenue and 581 W. Coll Street; 29°41′50″N 98°07′29″W	New Braunfels	
12	Faust Street Bridge	Faust Street Bridge	March 17, 2009 (#09000138)	Connecting Faust and Porter Streets at the Guadalupe River; 29°41′48″N 98°06′25″W	New Braunfels	Recorded Texas Historic Landmark, Historic Bridges of Texas MPS
13	Faust-Frueholz House and Medical Building	Faust-Frueholz House and Medical Building	August 29, 2024 (#100010760)	305 South Seguin Avenue; 29°42′05″N 98°07′18″W	New Braunfels	
14	First Protestant Church	First Protestant Church	July 14, 1971 (#71000926)	296 S. Seguin St. 29°42′03″N 98°07′21″W	New Braunfels	Recorded Texas Historic Landmark
15	Fischer Historic District	Fischer Historic District	June 19, 2017 (#100001222)	Roughly bounded by Fischer Store Rd., FM 32, Patriotic & Let's Roll Drs. 29°58′43″N 98°15′53″W	Fischer	Includes Recorded Texas Historic Landmark
16	Carl W. A. Groos House	Carl W. A. Groos House	August 17, 2000 (#00000884)	228 S. Seguin St. 29°42′05″N 98°07′22″W	New Braunfels	Recorded Texas Historic Landmark
17	Gruene Historic District	Gruene Historic District	April 21, 1975 (#75001962)	Both sides of Seguin, New Braunfels, and Austin Sts. 29°44′20″N 98°06′12″W	Gruene	Includes Recorded Texas Historic Landmarks
18	Guadalupe Hotel	Guadalupe Hotel	March 13, 1975 (#75001963)	471 Main Plaza; 29°42′11″N 98°07′31″W	New Braunfels	Recorded Texas Historic Landmark
19	Holz-Forshage-Krueger Building	Holz-Forshage-Krueger Building	April 17, 1997 (#97000362)	472 W. San Antonio St. 29°41′58″N 98°07′40″W	New Braunfels	
20	Honey Creek Historic District		March 26, 2018 (#100002267)	Along State Park 31 & Bell Ranch Rd., Parcels 77128, 82609, 73632, 77109, 77257, 80607, 81637, 149474; 29°50′20″N 98°30′50″W	Honey Creek	
21	Hotel Faust	Hotel Faust	May 2, 1985 (#85000922)	240 S. Seguin St. 29°42′05″N 98°07′22″W	New Braunfels	Recorded Texas Historic Landmark
22	Kabelmacher House		May 8, 2019 (#100003922)	23968 TX 46; 29°47′43″N 98°28′34″W	Spring Branch vicinity	
23	Kappelmann-Mayer Ranch		February 10, 2020 (#100004965)	4738 FM 1863; 29°44′46″N 98°23′46″W	Bulverde	
24	Stephen Klein House	Stephen Klein House	August 25, 1970 (#70000743)	161 S. Seguin St. 29°42′09″N 98°07′25″W	New Braunfels	Recorded Texas Historic Landmark
25	Lindheimer House	Lindheimer House	August 25, 1970 (#70000744)	489 Comal Ave. 29°42′02″N 98°07′07″W	New Braunfels	Recorded Texas Historic Landmark
26	Main Plaza	Main Plaza	October 12, 2021 (#100007074)	Main Plaza; 29°42′11″N 98°07′29″W	New Braunfels	
27	Mission Valley School and Teacherage		September 4, 2020 (#100005536)	1135 Mission Valley Rd. 29°43′12″N 98°12′18″W	New Braunfels	
28	Natural Bridge Caverns Sinkhole Site	Natural Bridge Caverns Sinkhole Site	October 29, 2004 (#04001202)	Address restricted	Garden Ridge	Located within Natural Bridge Caverns National Natural Landmark
29	Pape-Borchers Homestead		September 4, 2020 (#100005537)	142 Hueco Springs Loop Rd. 29°43′57″N 98°11′34″W	New Braunfels	
30	Riley's Tavern	Riley's Tavern	April 23, 2018 (#100002346)	8894 FM 1102; 29°48′23″N 98°01′25″W	New Braunfels	
31	Saint Joseph's Chapel	Saint Joseph's Chapel	August 1, 2014 (#14000472)	6400 FM 482; 29°38′50″N 98°13′08″W	Schertz	
32	Walzem Homestead		February 2, 2018 (#100002086)	690 Mission Valley Rd. 29°43′26″N 98°11′49″W	New Braunfels	

== See also ==
- National Register of Historic Places listings in Texas
- Recorded Texas Historic Landmarks in Comal County
