= Wesson =

Wesson may refer to

- Wesson, Mississippi, a town in Copiah County
- Wesson, Texas, a ghost town in Cormal County
- Wesson, Arkansas, a township in Union County, Arkansas
- Wesson cooking oil, a brand now owned by Richardson International, Limited
- USS Wesson (DE-184), a United States Navy destroyer escort
- Wesson (surname)
