= Sattler, Texas =

Neighborhood within the Canyon Lake census-designated place in Comal County, Texas

- Neighborhood, former Populated place
- Location within Texas Location within the United States
- Coordinates: 29°50′53″N 98°10′32″W
- Country: United States
- State: Texas
- County: Comal
- Census-designated place: Canyon Lake
- Elevation: 784 ft (239 m)
- Time zone: UTC-6 (Central (CST))
  - Summer (DST): UTC-5 (CDT)
- Area code: 830
- GNIS feature ID: 1367790

Sattler is a neighborhood within the Canyon Lake census-designated place in Comal County, Texas, United States. According to the Handbook of Texas, the community had a population of 30 in 2000. It is located within the Greater San Antonio area.

== History ==
On October 26, 2023, an EF0 tornado struck Sattler. The weak tornado damaged some trees and fences.

== Geography ==
Sattler is located on Farm to Market Road 2673, 10 mi (16 km) northwest of New Braunfels in east-central Comal County.

== Education ==
Today, the community is served by the Comal Independent School District. It is zoned for Mountain Valley Elementary School, Mountain Valley Middle School, and Canyon Lake High School.

== Notable person ==
- Herb Gray, who played for the Winnipeg Blue Bombers in the Canadian Football League.
