= Guadalupe Hotel =

- U.S. National Register of Historic Places
- Recorded Texas Historic Landmark
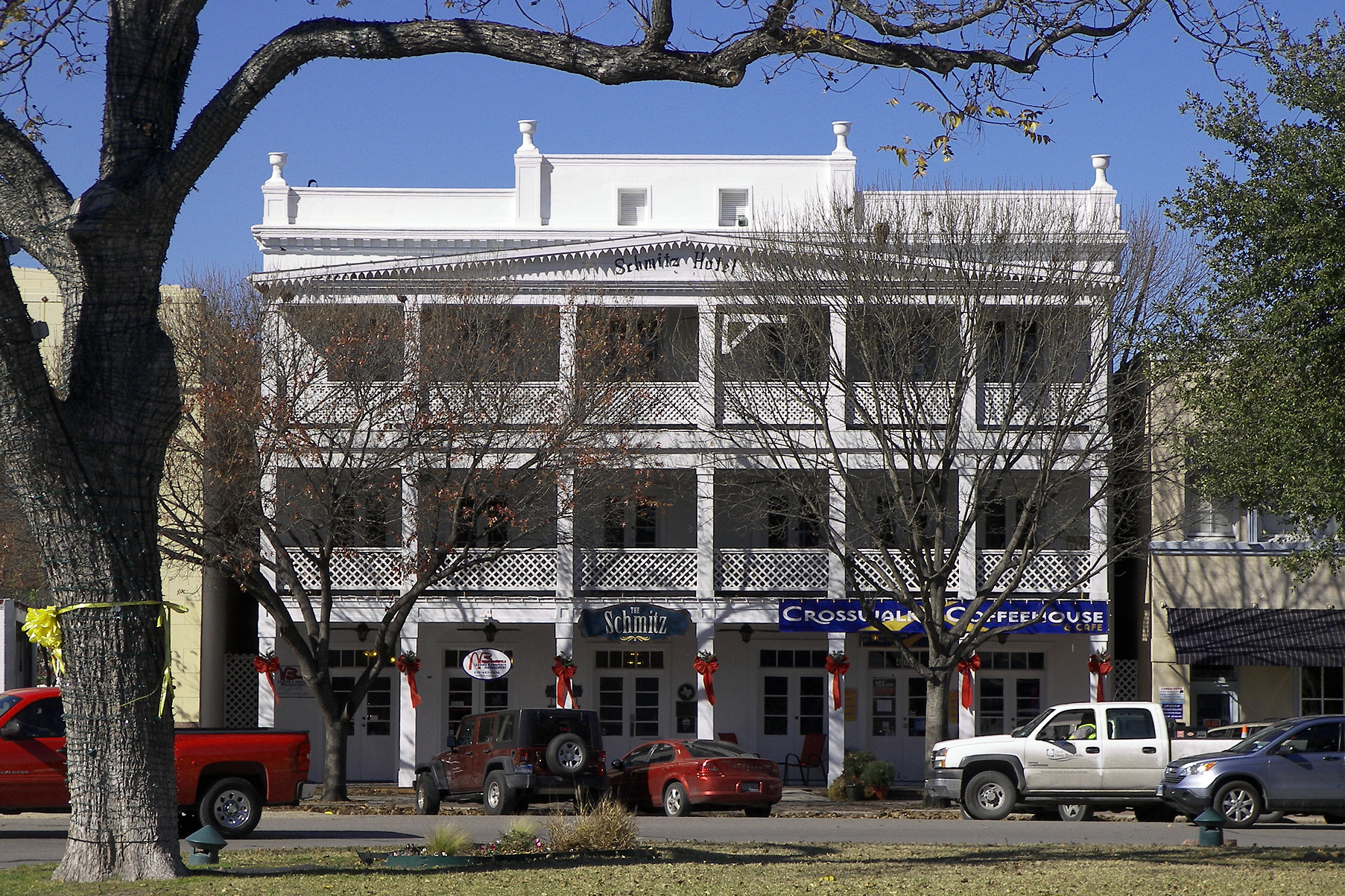
- Guadalupe Hotel

- Location within Texas Location within the United States
- Location: 471 Main Plaza, New Braunfels, Texas
- Coordinates: 29°42′10″N 98°7′30″W
- Area: 1 acre (0.40 ha)
- Built: 1851
- Website: Schmitz Vacation & Short Term Accommodations
- NRHP reference No.: 75001963
- RTHL No.: 4859

Significant dates
- Added to NRHP: March 13, 1975
- Designated RTHL: 1971

The Guadalupe Hotel is a historic hotel in downtown New Braunfels, Texas. It is located on the Main Plaza, adjacent from the Comal County Courthouse.

== See also ==
- National Register of Historic Places listings in Comal County, Texas
- Recorded Texas Historic Landmarks in Comal County
