= Lindheimer House =

Historic house in Texas, United States

- U.S. National Register of Historic Places
- Recorded Texas Historic Landmark
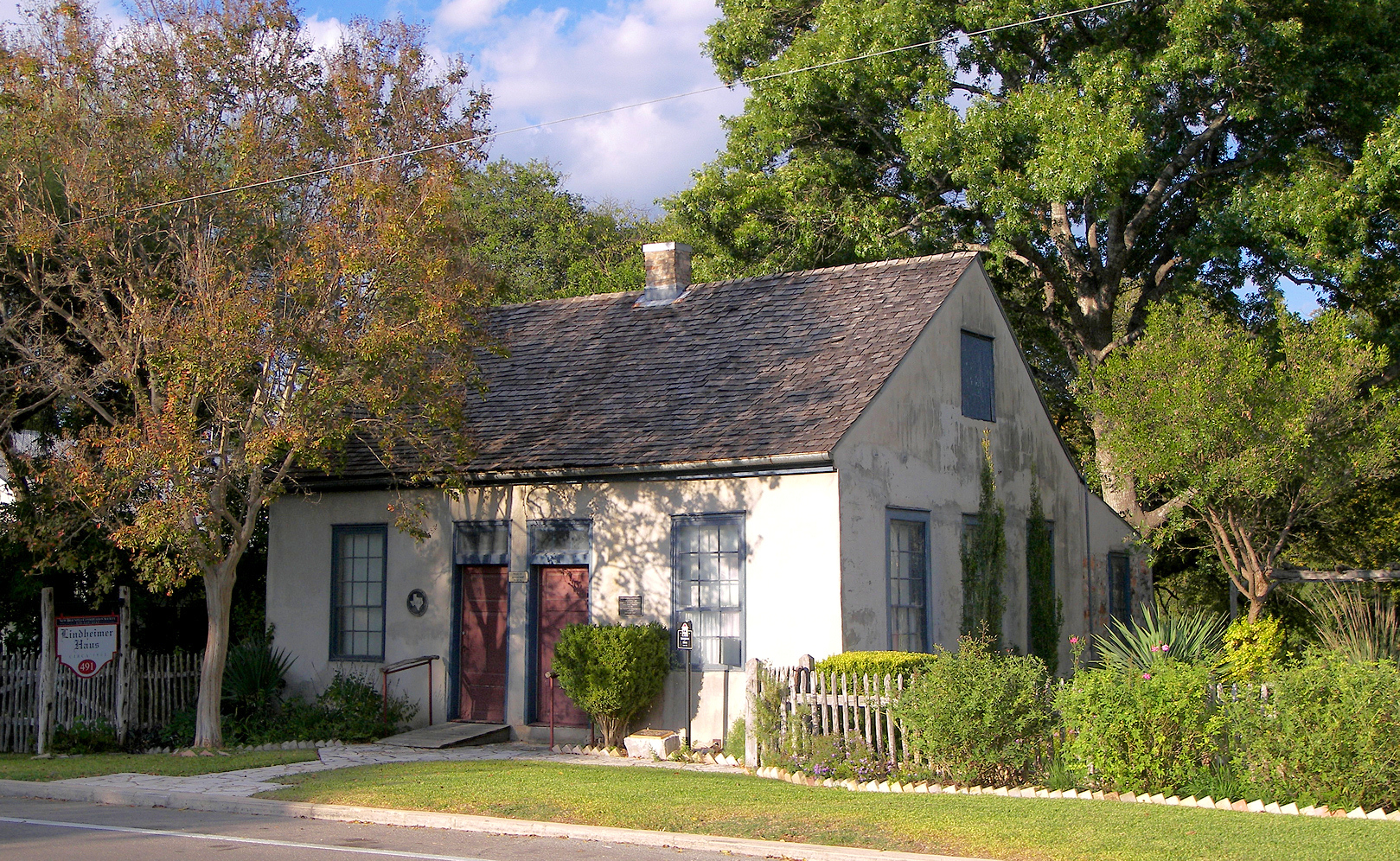
- Lindheimer House in New Braunfels

- Location within Texas Location within the United States
- Location: 491 Comal Ave., New Braunfels, Texas
- Coordinates: 29°42′1″N 98°7′6″W
- Area: 0.2 acres (0.081 ha)
- Built: 1852
- Architectural style: German Fachwerk
- NRHP reference No.: 70000744
- RTHL No.: 3089

Significant dates
- Added to NRHP: August 25, 1970
- Designated RTHL: 1962

The Lindheimer House is located in the city of New Braunfels, county of Comal, in the U.S. state of Texas. It was added to the National Register of Historic Places listings in Comal County, Texas in 1970, and designated a Recorded Texas Historic Landmark in 1936. The house is currently owned and run as a museum by the New Braunfels Conservation Society.

== Ferdinand Lindheimer ==
Ferdinand Jacob Lindheimer (1801–1879) was known as the father of Texas Botany. Born in Frankfurt, Germany, Lindheimer emigrated to the United States in 1834 to escape persecution resulting from his political activities. After military participation in Texas, Lindheimer moved to St. Louis, Missouri to partner in botanical research with George Engelmann and Asa Gray. His research brought him in touch with John O. Meusebach, after which Lindheimer moved back to Texas where he spent the rest of his life.

== Saltbox house ==
Lindheimer built his timber-framed house in 1852, in the saltbox style, with the roof at the back of his house sloping lower than the roof at the front of the house. Stucco covers the fachwerk totally on three sides of Lindheimer's house, but leaves it exposed in the back. A popular architecture style in New England, the saltbox house was also utilized among German immigrants in Texas. Rather than a full second story, Lindheimer's house has a loft as the second story. A centralized chimney heats the home. The front of the house has two transomed, paneled doors. In 1853, Lindheimer became the editor of the Die Neu Braunfels Zeitung, and published it out of his home for the next two decades, converting the rear of his house into a print shop. The New Braunfels Conservation Society operates the house as a museum.

== See also ==
- National Register of Historic Places listings in Comal County, Texas
- Recorded Texas Historic Landmarks in Comal County
- List of museums in Central Texas
