= Anhalt (disambiguation) =

Anhalt, a historical region of Germany, has formed part of the state of Saxony-Anhalt since 1990.

Anhalt may also refer to:

== Places ==
- Principality of Anhalt, a state of the Holy Roman Empire, at times partitioned into:
  - Anhalt-Aschersleben
  - Anhalt-Bernburg
  - Anhalt-Dessau
  - Anhalt-Köthen
  - Anhalt-Plötzkau
  - Anhalt-Zerbst
- Duchy of Anhalt, formed in 1863 after the unification of the above entities
- Free State of Anhalt, a state of Germany formed in 1918 after the abolition of the duchy
- The Roman Catholic Apostolic Vicariate of Anhalt
- Hołdunów (former name in German: Anhalt), a district of Lędziny, Silesian Voivodeship, Poland

== People ==
- The ruling House of Ascania, also known as House of Anhalt
- Adolph II, Prince of Anhalt-Köthen (1458–1526), Bishop of Merseburg
- Edna Anhalt (1914–1987), American screenwriter
- Edward Anhalt (1914–2000), American screenwriter, producer, and documentary film-maker
- Fred Anhalt (1896–1996), American builder and contractor
- Frédéric Prinz von Anhalt (born 1943), German-American socialite
- Günther Anhalt (1906–1945), Waffen-SS officer
- István Anhalt (1919–2012), Hungarian-Canadian composer
- Princess Magdalena Augusta of Anhalt-Zerbst (1679–1740), Duchess of Saxe-Gotha-Altenburg
- Princess Marie-Auguste of Anhalt (1898–1983), wife of Prince Joachim of Prussia

== See also ==
- Anhalt Hall in Comal County, Texas
- Anholt (disambiguation)
  - Anholt (Denmark), a small island in the Kattegat, sometimes rendered as "Anhalt" in English
