= Canyon City, Texas =

Neighborhood in Comal County, Texas, United States

- Neighborhood (former populated place)
- Location within Texas Location within the United States
- Coordinates: 29°52′26″N 98°11′16″W
- Country: United States
- State: Texas
- County: Comal
- Elevation: 846 ft (258 m)
- Time zone: UTC-6 (Central (CST))
  - Summer (DST): UTC-5 (CDT)
- Area code: 830
- GNIS feature ID: 1353773

Canyon City is a neighborhood within the Canyon Lake census-designated place in Comal County, Texas, United States. According to the Handbook of Texas, the community had a population of 100 in 2000. It is located within the Greater San Antonio area.

== History ==
Following the completion of the Canyon Lake reservoir in 1964, development of this predominantly residential region commenced in the 1960s. The population was 100 in 1970. Through 2000, that number did not change. The town had extensive flooding in 1998 and 2002.

== Geography ==
Canyon City is located on Farm to Market Road 306 on the Guadalupe River and just below Canyon Dam, 13 mi (21 km) northwest of New Braunfels in northeastern Comal County. It is now located within the Canyon Lake CDP.

== Education ==
Today, the community is served by the Comal Independent School District. It is zoned for Mountain Valley Elementary School, Mountain Valley Middle School, and Canyon Lake High School.
