= Anhalt, Texas =

Ghost town in Texas, US

- Ghost town
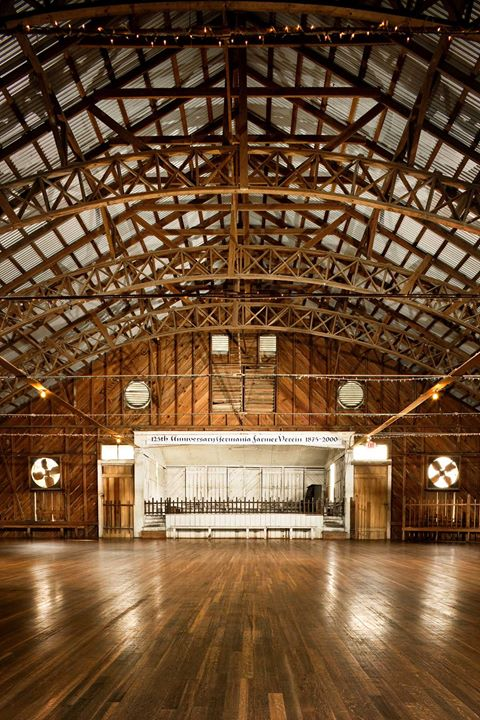
- Anhalt Hall in 2015

- Location in Texas
- Coordinates: 29.7941091°N 98.4755740°W
- Country: United States
- State: Texas
- County: Comal
- Elevation: 1,220 ft (372 m)

Anhalt is a ghost town in Comal County, Texas, United States. Settled in 1855 by Germans, the community was named Krause Settlement in 1859—for resident George Krause. In 1876, to protect against Native Americans, they organized into the Germania Farmers Verein and built the Anhalt Hall in 1887, and enlarged in 1896. A post office operated there from 1879 to 1907. Through the 20th century, Anhalt declined, and by the 1970s—the last time a population was recorded there—it had a population of 10; it was abandoned by 2000.

Despite being empty of population itself, the Anhalt Hall continues to host Maifest and Oktoberfest celebrations, which has been done continually since 1877.

There are two explanations for the name Anhalt. First, 'Anhalt' is German for 'stopping place', and Anhalt Hall was a rest stop for settlers—one of them, Heinrich Wehe, giving the suggestion. Second, it could refer to an Anhalt in Germany.
