= Business routes of Interstate 35 =

Interstate 35 Business

Location
- Country: United States

Highway system
- Interstate Highway System; Main; Auxiliary; Suffixed; Business; Future

Interstate business routes are roads connecting a central or commercial district of a city or town with an Interstate bypass. These roads typically follow along local streets often along a former U.S. Route or state highway that had been replaced by an Interstate. Interstate business route reassurance markers are signed as either loops or spurs using a green shield shaped sign and numbered like the shield of the parent Interstate highway.

Along Interstate 35 (I-35), business routes are found in four states through which I-35 passes: Texas, Missouri, Iowa, and Minnesota. Some states regard Interstate business routes as fully integrated within their state highway system while other states consider them to be either local roads to be maintained by county or municipal authorities or a hybrid of state and local control. Every state along I-35 regards its business routes as fully incorporated members of their respective state maintained highway systems.

Although the public may differentiate between different business routes by the number of the parent route and the location of the route, there is no uniform naming convention. Each state highway department internally uses its own designations to identify segments within its jurisdiction.

== Texas ==
=== Laredo business loop ===
Business Interstate 35-A
- Location: Laredo, Texas
- Length: 3.400 mi (5.472 km)
- Existed: March 26, 1991–present

Business Interstate 35-A (Bus. I-35-A) in Laredo runs from the end of the I-35 freeway via downtown to the Gateway to the Americas International Bridge, which then continues into Mexico as Mexico Federal Highway 85. The route is 3.4 miles (5.5 km) long.

In Laredo, Bus. I-35-A runs from its junction with I-35 southward along San Bernardo Avenue to Houston Street; thence westward along Houston Street to Salinas Avenue; thence southward along Salinas Avenue to the US Customs Port-of-Entry; thence northward along Convent Avenue to Matamoros Street; and thence eastward along Matamoros Street to the junction of I-35 and U.S. Highway 83 (US 83).

Travelers going south on I-35 in Laredo can take one of two toll international bridges across the Rio Grande and the Mexican border—straight ahead into Juárez–Lincoln International Bridge, or via Bus. I-35-A through downtown Laredo into Gateway to the Americas International Bridge.

The route was designated as Loop 420 on November 5, 1965, but was changed to Business U.S. Highway 83-K (Bus. US 83-K) on June 21, 1990, but as Bus. I-35-A on March 26, 1991.

=== Encinal business loop ===
Business Interstate 35-B
- Location: Encinal, Texas
- Length: 1.222 mi (Note: The certified length given is shorter than the actual mileage, as the Texas Department of Transportation description of Bus. I-35-B considers it to be discontinuous at rather than concurrent with SH 44.) (1.967 km)
- Existed: June 21, 1990–present

Business Interstate 35-B (Bus. I-35-B) in Encinal is a former alignment of US 81. The route's southern terminus is at northbound I-35 exit 38, just south of the Webb–La Salle county line. It briefly travels westward, crossing under I-35 and then turns north along Main Street, paralleling the Union Pacific Railroad tracks to the west. It has an intersection with State Highway 44 (SH 44) and turns to the east, concurrent with SH 44, before ending at I-35 exit 39.

From January 20, 1977, to June 21, 1990, this route was designated Loop 532, but was signed as a business route of US 81.

Junction list

County	Location	mi	km	Destinations	Notes
Webb		0.0	0.0	I-35 south – Laredo	Southern terminus; no southbound exit from I-35; I-35 north exit 38
La Salle	Encinal	1.2	1.9	SH 44 west	South end of SH 44 overlap
La Salle		1.4	2.3	I-35 – Cotulla SH 44 east – Freer	Northern terminus; road continues east as SH 44; I-35 exit 39
1.000 mi = 1.609 km; 1.000 km = 0.621 mi: Concurrency terminus; Incomplete access

=== Cotulla business loop ===
Business Interstate 35-C
- Location: Cotulla, Texas
- Length: 2.872 mi (4.622 km)
- Existed: March 26, 1991–present

Business Interstate 35-C (Bus. I-35-C) in Cotulla is routed along Main Street, which was previously US 81, and connects to I-35 at exits 65 and 69. Within the Cotulla city limits, the route intersects SH 97 and Farm to Market Road 468 (FM 468).

Junction list

The entire route is in La Salle County.

Location	mi	km	Destinations	Notes
	0.0	0.0	I-35 – Encinal	I-35 exit 65
Cotulla	1.8	2.9	SH 97 east (Tilden Street) to FM 624 – Jourdanton	
Cotulla	2.0	3.2	FM 468 west – Big Wells	
Cotulla	2.9	4.7	I-35 – San Antonio	I-35 exit 68
1.000 mi = 1.609 km; 1.000 km = 0.621 mi

=== Dilley business loop ===
Business Interstate 35-D
- Location: Dilley, Texas
- Length: 4.147 mi (6.674 km)
- Existed: March 26, 1991–present

Business Interstate 35-D (Bus. I-35-D) in Dilley is routed along Main Street, which was previously US 81. The route's southern terminus is at I-35 exit 82; it travels northward, paralleling the Union Pacific Railroad tracks to the east. Within the Dilley city limits, the route intersects SH 85 and FM 117 before ending at I-35 exit 86.

Junction list

The entire route is in Frio County.

Location	mi	km	Destinations	Notes
	0.0	0.0	I-35 – Cotulla, Pearsall	I-35 exit 82
Dilley	1.7	2.7	SH 85 – Carrizo Springs, Charlotte	
Dilley	2.1	3.4	FM 117 north – Uvalde	
	4.1	6.6	I-35 – Cotulla, San Antonio	I-35 exit 86
1.000 mi = 1.609 km; 1.000 km = 0.621 mi

=== Pearsall business loop ===
Business Interstate 35-E
- Location: Pearsall, Texas
- Length: 5.449 mi (8.769 km)
- Existed: March 26, 1991–present

Business Interstate 35-E (Bus. I-35-E) in Pearsall was designated on March 26, 1991, along a former portion of US 81.

Bus. I-35-E begins at I-35 exit 99 in southwestern Pearsall concurrent with FM 1581. The two highways run together until FM 140, where FM 1581 ends and Bus. I-35-E turns east onto FM 140. Bus. I-35-E and FM 140 run together along Comal Street then turn north onto Oak Street at Spur 581. Bus. I-35-E and FM 140 run together on Oak Street through downtown Pearsall with FM 140 leaving at Colorado Street. Leaving the downtown area, the route of Bus. I-35-E gradually becomes less developed and more rural, passes by Pearsall High School, then leaves the Pearsall city limits. Bus. I-35-E ends at I-35 exit 104 near the CDP of North Pearsall.

Junction list

The entire route is in Frio County.

Location	mi	km	Destinations	Notes
Pearsall	0.0	0.0	I-35 – Cotulla, Devine FM 1581 south – Divot	Southern terminus; road continues south as FM 1581; I-35 exit 99
Pearsall	1.0	1.6	FM 140 west / FM 1581 ends – Uvalde	North end of FM 1581 overlap; south end of FM 140 overlap
Pearsall	1.6	2.6	Spur 581 south – Cotulla	
Pearsall	1.7	2.7	FM 140 east – Charlotte	North end of FM 140 overlap
	5.4	8.7	I-35 – San Antonio	Northern terminus; I-35 exit 104
1.000 mi = 1.609 km; 1.000 km = 0.621 mi: Concurrency terminus

=== New Braunfels business loop ===
Business Interstate 35-H
- Location: New Braunfels, Texas
- Length: 4.488 mi (7.223 km)
- Existed: 1991–present

Business Interstate 35-H (Bus. I-35-H) in New Braunfels is known locally as Elliot Knox Boulevard. The highway was designated on March 26, 1991, with the mileage being transferred from US 81.

Bus. I-35-H begins at I-35 exit 185 and briefly runs along Schimdt Avenue before turning onto Elliot Knox Boulevard approximately 0.2 miles (0.32 km) north of I-35. The highway runs in a generally east–west direction, passing by many residential areas. Just east of Seguin Avenue, Bus. I-35-H crosses over the Guadalupe River and briefly serves as the frontage road for southbound I-35. The highway turns toward the northeast and has an intersection with SH 46/Loop 337 before running through less developed areas of the town. Bus. I-35-H ends at I-35 exit 190A, near Canyon High School.

Junction list

The entire route is in New Braunfels, Comal County.

mi	km	Destinations	Notes
0.0	0.0	I-35 – Austin, San Antonio	I-35 exit 185
2.2	3.5	Bus. SH 46 west (Seguin Avenue) / FM 725 south – Business District, McQueeney	South end of Bus. SH 46
2.4	3.9	Bridge over the Guadalupe River	
3.4	5.5	SH 46 / Loop 337 – Boerne, Seguin	North end of Bus. SH 46 overlap
4.3	6.9	I-35 – Austin, San Antonio	I-35 exit 190A
1.000 mi = 1.609 km; 1.000 km = 0.621 mi: Concurrency terminus

=== Kyle business loop ===
Business Interstate 35-J
- Location: Kyle, Texas
- Length: 1.461 mi (2.351 km)
- Existed: June 21, 1990–present

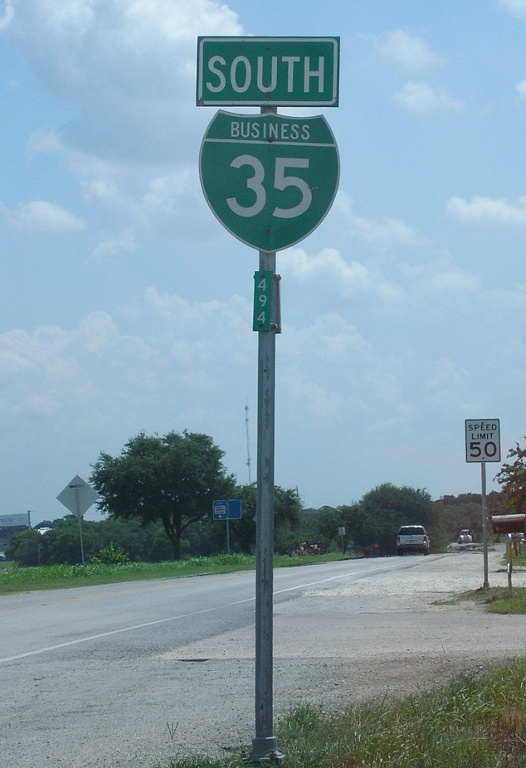
Route marker near the northern terminus of the Kyle business loop

Business Interstate 35-J (Bus. I-35-J) in Kyle is the former alignment of US 81 through the city.

The route is accessible from southbound I-35 at exit 213, which serves Ranch to Market Road 150 (RM 150); the business loop designation begins along the frontage road at the end of the exit ramp. The road travels through Kyle and crosses RM 150 before once again becoming the southbound I-35 frontage road north of milemarker 213.

=== Round Rock business loop ===
Business Interstate 35-L
- Location: Round Rock, Texas
- Length: 3.648 mi (5.871 km)
- Existed: June 21, 1990–February 28, 2013

Business Interstate 35-L (Bus. I-35-L) in Round Rock was commissioned on June 21, 1990, and followed the previous route of US 81 along Mays Street, from Hesters Crossing Road to Old Settlers Boulevard for approximately 4.5 miles (7.2 km). The designation was canceled on February 28, 2013, and the section north of US 79 was transferred to Spur 379. Spur 379 was given to the city of Round Rock on March 26, 2020.

From August 1, 1963, to June 21, 1990, the route was designated as Loop 384.

=== Georgetown business loop ===
Business Interstate 35-M
- Location: Georgetown, Texas
- Length: 5.1 mi (8.2 km)
- Existed: June 21, 1990–May 25, 2006

Business Interstate 35-M (Bus. I-35-M) was located in Georgetown. The route was decommissioned on May 25, 2006, with portions being renamed as Spur 26 and Spur 158.

From October 15, 1965, to June 21, 1990, the route was designated as Loop 418.

=== Alvarado business loop ===
Business Interstate 35-V
- Location: Alvarado, Texas
- Length: 2.288 mi (3.682 km)
- Existed: October 25, 1990–present

Business Interstate 35-V (Bus. I-35-V) in Alvarado runs along the former alignment of US 81 along Parkway Drive and is accessible from I-35W at exits 24 (both directions) and 26B (southbound only). The section from US 67 to College Street is cosigned as Bus. US 67-N, though it is not part of that route's official designation.

From November 20, 1963, to October 25, 1990, the route was designated as Loop 392.

Junction list

The entire route is in Alvarado, Johnson County.

mi	km	Destinations	Notes
0.0– 0.2	0.0– 0.32	I-35W / FM 3136 west	Southern terminus; I-35W exit 24
0.4	0.64	FM 1706 north	
1.2	1.9	Bus. US 67 west (West College Street) / Glenwood Drive	South end of Bus. US 67 overlap
1.9	3.1	US 67 / Bus. US 67 ends	North end of Bus. US 67 overlap
2.3	3.7	I-35W north	Northern terminus at northbound I-35W frontage road; former I-35W south exit 26B
1.000 mi = 1.609 km; 1.000 km = 0.621 mi: Concurrency terminus

=== Sanger business loop ===
Business Interstate 35-X
- Location: Sanger, Texas
- Length: 1.883 mi (3.030 km)
- Existed: December 19, 1991–present

Business Interstate 35-X (Bus. I-35-X) in Sanger is a former alignment of US 77 through Sanger and is accessible from both directions of I-35 at exit 477. The route travels north along 5th Street and crosses FM 455 before ending at the northbound I-35 frontage road near milemarker 479.

From November 18, 1960, to December 19, 1991, this route was designated Spur 138. Since March 26, 2009, that route number has been used for an unrelated route in Hunt County.

== Missouri ==
=== Cameron business loop ===
Interstate 35 Business
- Location: Cameron, Missouri
- Length: 3.2 mi (5.1 km)

Interstate 35 Business Loop (I-35 BL) in Cameron runs between exits 52 and 54. It begins westbound from I-35 overlapping Route BB westbound (East Evergreen Street), then turns north at the intersection with US 69 (South Walnut Street). At Grand Avenue, US 36 Bus. joins the route. At the US 36 expressway bypass, the routes turn east onto US 36 and finally terminating at I-35.

Junction list

The entire route is in Cameron.

County	mi	km	Destinations	Notes
Clinton	0.0	0.0	I-35 / Route 110 (CKC) – Bethany, Kansas City, Des Moines; Route BB	Southern terminus; I-35 exit 52; road continues east as Route BB; access to Cameron Regional Medical Center
Clinton	0.9	1.4	US 69 south (South Walnut Street)	South end of US 69 overlap
Clinton	1.4	2.3	Route A (Prospect Street)	
DeKalb	2.0	3.2	US 36 Bus. west	South end of US 36 Bus. overlap
DeKalb	2.4	3.9	US 36 west / US 69 north / US 36 Bus. ends – St. Joseph, Winston	Interchange; north end of US 69 / US 36 Bus. overlap; south end of US 36 overlap
DeKalb	3.2	5.1	I-35 / US 36 east / Route 110 (CKC) – Bethany, Kansas City, Des Moines, Hamilton	Northern terminus; I-35 exit 54; road continues east as US 36 / Route 110 (CKC)
1.000 mi = 1.609 km; 1.000 km = 0.621 mi: Concurrency terminus

== Iowa ==
=== Ames business loop ===
Interstate 35 Business Loop
- Location: Ames, Iowa
- Length: 8.92 mi (14.36 km)
- Existed: October 27, 1995–present

Interstate 35 Business Loop (I-35 BL) in Ames runs between exits 111 and 113. It begins westbound from I-35 overlapping US 30 westbound, then turns north at the interchange with US 69 (South Duff Avenue). At Lincoln Way, the routes turn west again, only to turn north again at Grand Avenue. I-35 BL breaks away from the overlap with US 69 by turning east onto East 13th Street until finally terminating at I-35.

=== Clear Lake business loop ===
Interstate 35 Business Loop
- Location: Clear Lake, Iowa
- Length: 3 mi (4.8 km)
- Existed: April 16, 1999–present

Interstate 35 Business Loop (I-35 BL) in Clear Lake runs between exits 193 and 194 on I-35. The route begins at exit 193 where it runs west along 4th Avenue South (former Iowa Highway 106 (Iowa 106)), until the intersection with North 8th Street (former Iowa 107) and turns north. Immediately after a grade crossing with a former Milwaukee Road railroad line, the route makes a right turn overlapping US 18. The route follows US 18, which itself runs parallel to that old Milwaukee Road line until it curves away after North 14th Street. East of North 20th Street, I-35 BL/US 18 becomes a divided highway. I-35 BL ends at exit 194 on I-35, US 18 turns south in an overlap with I-35, and the road previously carrying both routes becomes US 18 Bus./Iowa 122.

== Minnesota ==
=== Albert Lea business loop ===
Interstate 35 Business
- Location: Albert Lea, Minnesota

Interstate 35 Business (I-35 Bus.) in Albert Lea runs along US 65 between exits 8 and 12 on I-35. The route begins at a quarter cloverleaf interchange with exit 8 and runs northwest along US 65, a four-lane at-grade divided highway. North of 7th Avenue, the routes curve straight north onto South Broadway Avenue and becomes a two-lane undivided highway. Arriving downtown, the routes intersect Front Street with a level crossing of a railroad line running from the southwest to the northeast corner of that intersection before crossing another railroad line immediately after this intersection. I-35 Bus./US 65 makes a sharp right turn to the east onto Main Street (CHAS 46), while in the opposite direction is the southern beginning of Minnesota State Highway 13 (MN 13). North Broadway continues from that point toward Fountain Lake Park four blocks north. I-35 Bus./US 65/CHAS 46 runs straight east along a divided highway for a block and a half then begins to curve to the northeast until after it crosses a bridge over the Shell Rock River, then curves back to the east before the bridge over the first railroad line that two of these routes crossed downtown. Halfway between Ulstad and Fenton avenues, the road curves to the northeast again and the divider widens, as frontage roads begin on both sides at Morningside Avenue. East of the intersection with Prospect Avenue, I-35 Bus. and US 65 break away from CHAS 46 at a northbound only Y interchange and has only one last intersection at Sorenson Road (CHAS 45) and Blake Avenue. I-35 Bus. and US 65 both terminate at a northbound only flyunder interchange with I-35 at exit 12, which is marked as such southbound.

=== Faribault business loop ===
Interstate 35 Business
- Location: Faribault, Minnesota
- Length: 3.3 mi (5.3 km)
- Existed: 2006–present

Interstate 35 Business (I-35 Bus.) in Faribault begins at the intersection of I-35 and Lyndale Avenue/County State Aid Highway 48 (CR 48, exit 55) to the intersection with MN 60 and thence northerly along MN 21, and terminates at the intersection of I-35 and MN 21 (exit 59). The route travels south to north through the business district of Faribault, a distance of approximately three miles (4.8 km).

=== Pine City business loop ===
Interstate 35 Business
- Location: Pine City, Minnesota
- Length: 2.9 mi (4.7 km)
- Existed: 2013–present

Interstate 35 Business (I-35 Bus.) in Pine City begins at the intersection of I-35 and CR 7 (exit 169) to the intersection with CR 61 and thence northerly along CR 61, parallel to I-35, to the intersection with CR 11. Thence the business route extends westerly along CR 11 and terminates at the intersection of I-35 and CR 11 (exit 171). The route travels south to north through the business district of Pine City, a distance of approximately three miles (4.8 km).
