= Riley's Tavern =

- U.S. National Register of Historic Places
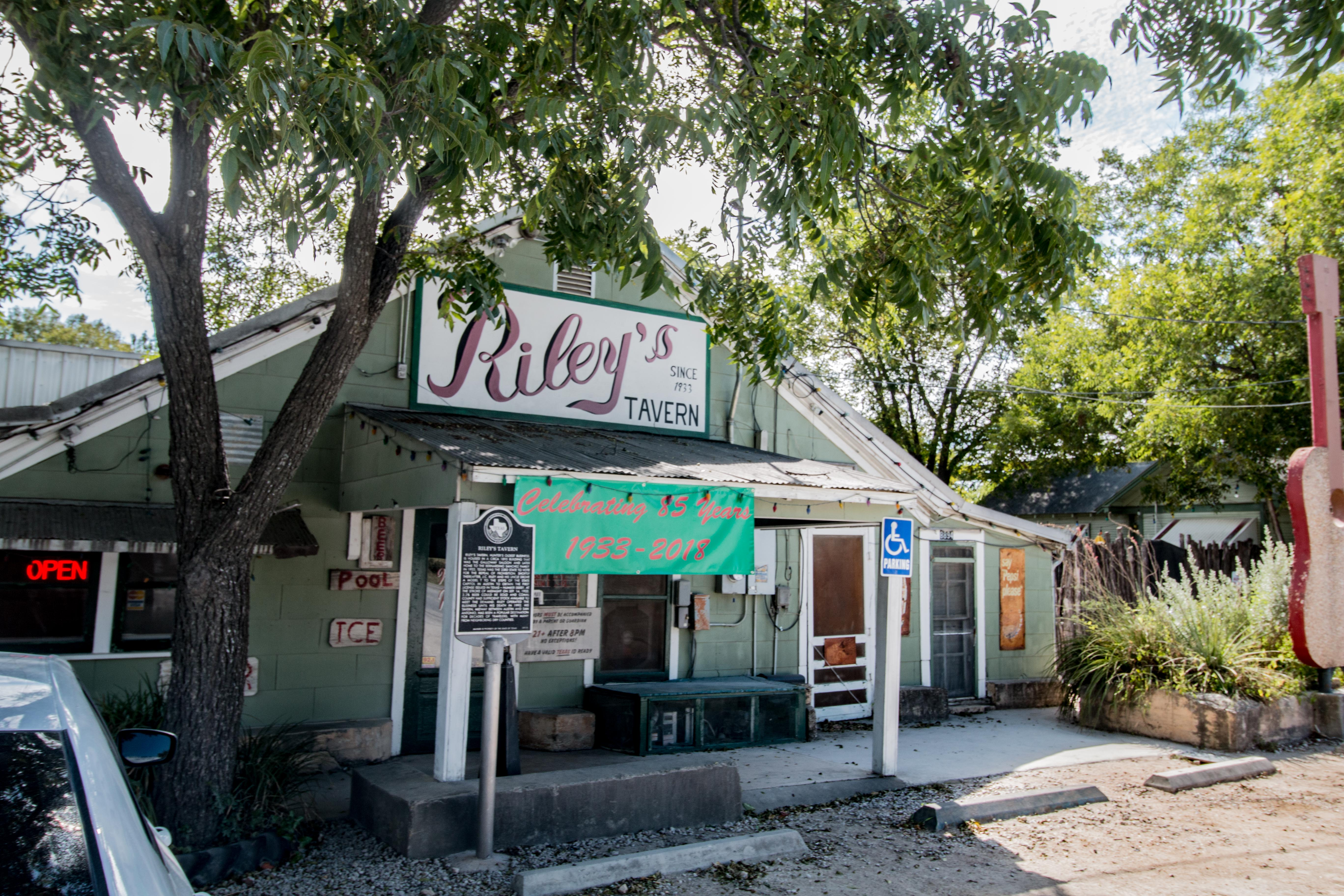

- Location within Texas Location within the United States
- Location: 8894 FM 1102, in or near New Braunfels, Texas
- Coordinates: 29°48′23″N 98°01′25″W
- Area: less than one acre
- Built: 1936
- NRHP reference No.: 100002346
- Added to NRHP: April 23, 2018

Riley's Tavern, in Hunter, Texas (close to New Braunfels, Texas), was listed on the National Register of Historic Places in 2018.

The building was constructed in the 1800s, but it was not notable until it was converted into a tavern by James Curtis Riley in 1933. Located near a railroad stop on the Missouri Pacific Railroad, and near the border of a dry county, it did well. It was the first tavern in Texas to get a license after Prohibition was lifted in 1933.
