= Logan Cunningham (pole vaulter) =

American pole vaulter (born 1991)

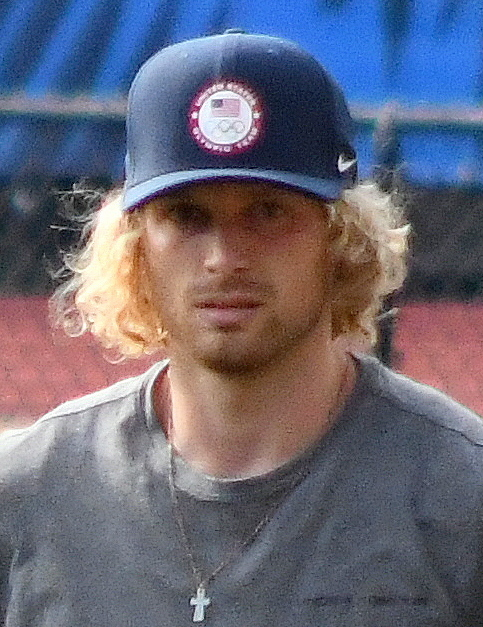

Personal information
- Nationality: American
- Born: May 30, 1991 (age 35) Smithson Valley, Texas
- Height: 1.76 m (5 ft 9 1/2 in)
- Weight: 72 kg (159 lb)

Sport
- Sport: Track and field
- Event: Pole vault
- College team: Texas State Bobcats
- Club: Nike, Usana Inc.
- Turned pro: 2014
- Coached by: Elite Sports coach Brookelyn Dickson (Merhman) and Texas State coach Keith Herston
- Retired: 2018

Achievements and titles
- Personal best: Pole vault: 5.81 m (19 ft 1/2 in)
- Updated on July 2016

Logan Cunningham (born May 30, 1991) is an American track and field athlete and 2016 Olympian, who specializes in the pole vault. He holds a personal best of 5.81 m (19 ft 1/2 in), set in 2016 and was sponsored by Nike.

A Texas native, Cunningham attended Smithson Valley High School before enrolling at Texas State University in 2009. He competed collegiately for the Texas State Bobcats. At the NCAA Men's Division I Outdoor Track and Field Championships he was fourth in 2011, but did not record a mark at the 2012 event. He was also a finalist at the 2012 and 2013 NCAA Men's Division I Indoor Track and Field Championships, achieving All American status. At regional level, he won one Western Athletic Conference title and one Southland Conference title, setting conference records in the process.

On his international debut at the 2012 NACAC Under-23 Championships in Athletics he won the bronze medal. Cunningham reached new heights in the 2014 season, clearing 5.70 m (18 ft 8 1/4 in) in March. This made him the third highest ranked American vaulter that year, behind Mark Hollis and Sam Kendricks, and established him on the professional circuit. He competed at the 2012 United States Olympic Trials and the 2013 USA Outdoor Track and Field Championships, and placed fourth at the 2014 USA Indoor Championships, He competed at the Outdoor Championships later that year and came in twelfth.

Cunningham missed the 2015 outdoor season due to injury and on his return placed 13th at the 2016 USA Indoors. However, his return outdoor came with a new personal record clearance of 5.71 m (18 ft 8 3/4 in). His comeback continued with a clearance of 5.60 m (18 ft 4 1/4 in) at the 2016 United States Olympic Trials which earned him a place on the U.S. Olympic team.

== Major competitions ==
Year	Competition	Venue	Position	Notes
2012	NACAC U23 Championships	Irapuato, Mexico	3rd	5.30 m
2016	Olympic Games	Rio de Janeiro, Brazil	28th (q)	5.30 m
USATF Outdoor Championships, USA Indoor Track and Field Championships
2010	USA Junior Outdoor Track and Field Championships	Des Moines, Iowa	5th	5.00 m (16 ft 4 3/4 in)
2012	USA Olympic Trials	Eugene, Oregon	T-11th	NH @ 5.30 m (17 ft 4 1/2 in)
2013	USA Outdoor Track and Field Championships	Des Moines, Iowa	T-11th	NH @ 5.35 m (17 ft 6 1/2 in)
2014	USA Indoor Track and Field Championships	Albuquerque, New Mexico	T-4th	5.45 m (17 ft 10 1/2 in)
2014	USA Outdoor Track and Field Championships	Sacramento, California	12th	5.40 m (17 ft 8 1/2 in)
2016	USA Indoor Track and Field Championships	Portland, Oregon	13th	5.35 m (17 ft 6 1/2 in)
2016	USA Olympic Trials	Eugene, Oregon	3rd	5.60 m (18 ft 4 1/4 in)
2017	USA Indoor Track and Field Championships	Albuquerque, New Mexico	2nd	5.65 m (18 ft 6 1/4 in)
2017	USA Outdoor Track and Field Championships	Sacramento, California	7th	5.60 m (18 ft 4 1/4 in)
2018	USA Indoor Track and Field Championships	Albuquerque, New Mexico	6th	5.53 m (18 ft 1 1/2 in)
2018	USA Outdoor Track and Field Championships	Des Moines, Iowa	T-10th	NH @ 5.45 m (17 ft 10 1/2 in)
