= Texas State Highway Loop 337 =

State highway in Texas

State Highway Loop 337
- Loop 337 highlighted in red

Route information
- Maintained by TxDOT
- Length: 3.029 mi (4.875 km) 8.3 miles (13.4 km) including concurrent segment with SH 46
- Existed: 1960–present

Major junctions
- CCW end: I-35 in New Braunfels
- SH 46 in New Braunfels
- CW end: I-35 in New Braunfels

Location
- Country: United States
- State: Texas

Highway system
- Highways in Texas; Interstate; US; State; Former; Toll; Loops; Spurs; FM/RM; Park; Rec
← Loop 336	→ Loop 338

Loop 337 is a 8.3-mile-long (13.4 km) partial loop route around the city of New Braunfels in the U.S. state of Texas. The loop was designated in 1960. Loop 337 begins and ends at I-35 and shares a concurrency with SH 46 from the interchange at SH 46 eastward to I-35.

== History ==
Loop 337 was first designated on June 1, 1960 as a loop around New Braunfels from I-35 southwest of New Braunfels, around the north side of the city, and ending at and intersection of US 81 and FM 25 east of the Guadalupe River. On October 21, 1967, SH 46 was rerouted to run concurrently along the eastern half of the loop. On February 26, 1968, the clockwise end of the loop was extended to I-35 over part of FM 25.

== Route description ==
Loop 337 begins on the southwestern side of New Braunfels at I-35, heading north through the city predominantly as a surface street with at-grade intersections. There are a few exceptions to this, the first being at Landa Street: Loop 337 passes over the street and the railroad track running parallel to it; access to Landa Street is provided by way of a single ramp. After this interchange Loop 337 turns towards the northeast and into the city, where it meets SH 46 at a diamond interchange. From here and to the east, Loop 337 and SH 46 run along the northern fringes of the city limits as a concurrent, co-signed route. As the loop turns towards the southeast, another interchange due to a railroad bridge occurs at Rock Street and Gruene Road. After crossing the Guadalupe River, Loop 337 turns towards the south at the Common Street intersection. The route comes to an end at I-35 on the northeastern side of the city, while SH 46 continues on to the south toward Seguin.

== Junction list ==
The entire route is in New Braunfels, Comal County.

mi	km	Destinations	Notes
0.0	0.0	I-35 / Rueckle Road	I-35 exit 184; continues past I-35 as Rueckle Road
1.7	2.7	Landa Street	Interchange
2.8	4.5	SH 46 west / Bus. SH 46 – Boerne, New Braunfels	Interchange; west end of SH 46 concurrency
5.6	9.0	Rock Street – Gruene	Interchange; clockwise exit and counterclockwise entrance
5.8	9.3	Gruene Road – Gruene	Interchange; no counterclockwise entrance
8.1	13.0	I-35 BL (Elliot Knox Boulevard) – Austin, San Antonio	
8.3	13.4	I-35 / SH 46 east – Austin, San Antonio, Seguin	I-35 exit 189; continues past I-35 as SH 46
1.000 mi = 1.609 km; 1.000 km = 0.621 mi: Concurrency terminus; Incomplete access
