= Fischer, Texas =

Unincorporated community in Comal County, Texas, United States

- Unincorporated community
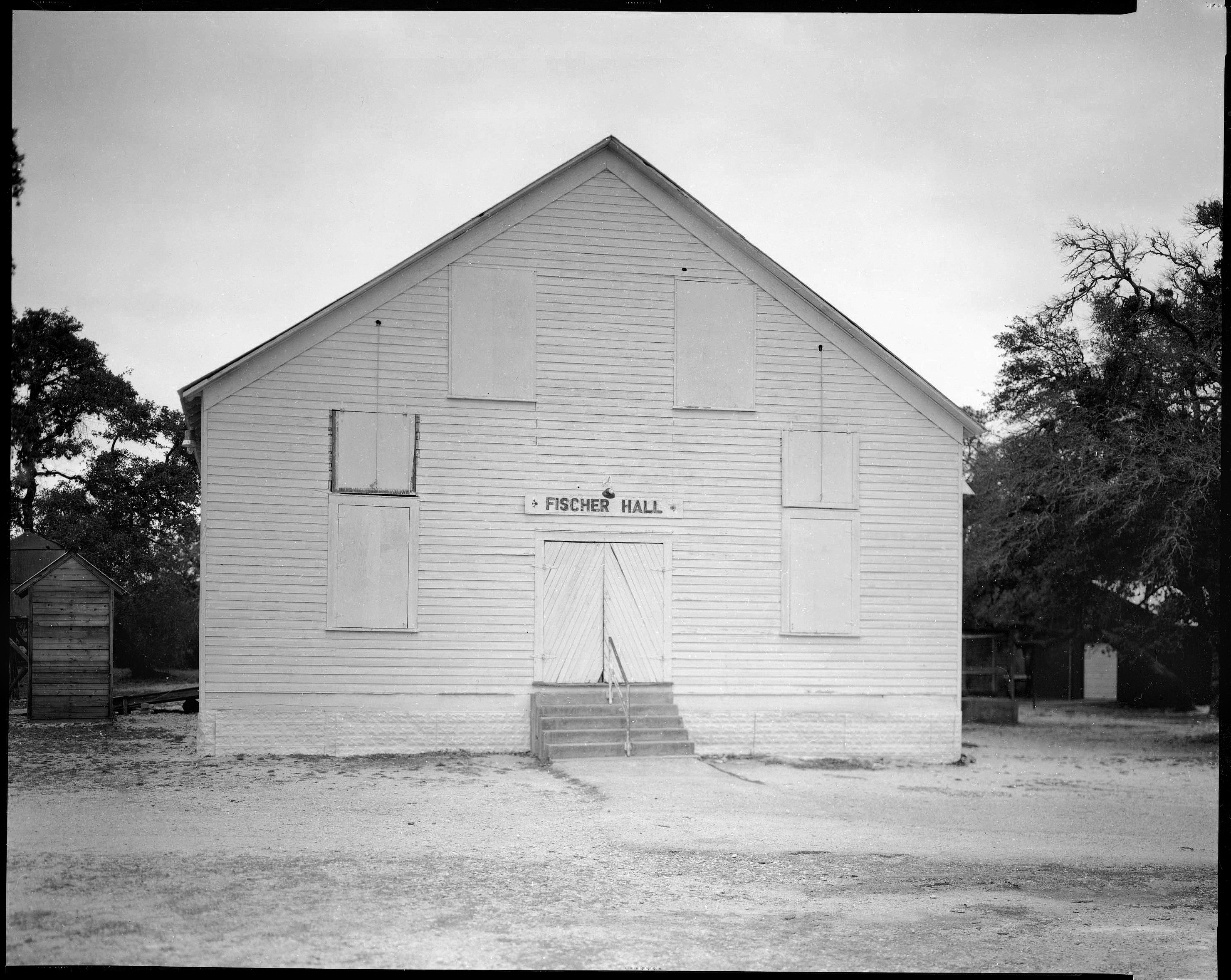
- Fischer Hall, March 2013

- Location within Texas Location within the United States
- Coordinates: 29°58′37″N 98°15′57″W
- Country: United States
- State: Texas
- County: Comal
- Elevation: 1,148 ft (350 m)
- Time zone: UTC-6 (Central (CST))
  - Summer (DST): UTC-5 (CDT)
- Area code: 830
- GNIS feature ID: 1373720

Fischer is an unincorporated community in Comal County, Texas, United States. According to the Handbook of Texas, the community had a population of 20 in 2000. It is included in the Greater San Antonio area.

== History ==
The population jumped to 688 in 2010.

The core of the village, as well as its surrounding landscape and transportation patterns, were listed on the National Register of Historic Places in 2017 as the Fischer Historic District.

Although it is unincorporated, Fischer has a post office, with the ZIP code 78623.

In 2016, a species of fossil sea urchins called Tetragramma donaldtrumpi was discovered by William R. Thompson, Jr. in the community.

The cover art for the Owen Temple album General Store was taken in front of the Fischer Store.

== Geography ==
Fischer is located at the intersection of Farm to Market Roads 484 and 32, 20 mi (32 km) northwest of New Braunfels, 8 mi (13 km) southeast of Blanco, and 4 mi (6.4 km) north of Canyon Lake in the Texas Hill Country of northern Comal County.

=== Climate ===
The climate in this area is characterized by hot, humid summers and generally mild to cool winters. According to the Köppen Climate Classification system, Fischer has a humid subtropical climate, abbreviated "Cfa" on climate maps.

During the 2022–23 North American winter, a total of 0.75 inches (1.9 cm) of ice built up in the community.

== Education ==
Today, residents are zoned to the Comal Independent School District.

Zoned schools:

- Mountain Valley and Rebecca Creek elementaries
- Mountain Valley Middle School
- Canyon Lake High School

== Media ==
The movie Harbinger was filmed in Fischer in 2016.

== Notable person ==
- Hal Ketchum, country music singer and songwriter.

== See also ==
- List of unincorporated communities in Texas
- National Register of Historic Places listings in Comal County, Texas
