= Anhalt Hall =

Dance hall and community center in Texas, US

Coordinates: 29°48′49.8″N 98°28′43.72″W

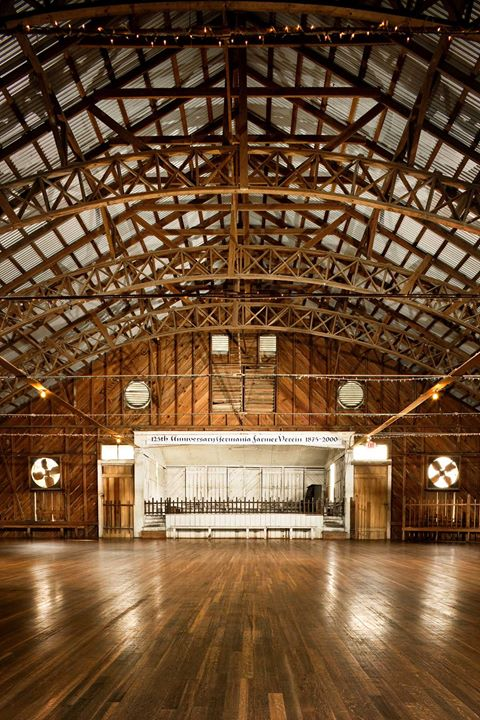
- Anhalt Hall in 2015

General information
- Location: Spring Branch, Comal County, Texas, United States
- Year built: 1879
- Renovated: 1898, 1908, 2013
- Anhalt Hall
- U.S. National Register of Historic Places
- NRHP reference No.: 100002697
- Added to NRHP: July 23, 2018

Anhalt Hall is a dance hall and community center in Comal County, Texas, United States.

== History ==
The community around Anhalt Hall was settled in 1855 by Germans. It was originally built by the Germania Farmer Verein—an organization of the Anhalt residents—in 1879, to protect residents and their livestock from cattle rustlers and Native American predations. It was successful, and they created internal regulations by February 7, 1876.

It later became a rest stop on the trail between New Braunfels and Boerne. One of the wayfarers, Heinrich Wehe, suggested the name of the community changed from Krause Settlement' to 'Anhalt'—the German word for 'stopping place'. The building was expanded upon from 1887 to 1898. In 1908, the dance floor was added, taking up 6,000 square feet. Despite the surrounding settlement being abandoned by the end of the 20th century, the Hall lived on. In 1993, the Farmer Verein spent $50,00 to renovate the building and replace the roof.

The Hall was a location in the 2000 film All the Pretty Horses.

Maifest and Oktoberfest are held at the Hall annually.

The Hall was added to the National Register of Historic Places on July 23, 2018.

=== Performances ===
One of the first bands to play at Anhalt Hall was the William Specht Spring Branch Band—a six-member brass group formed in 1880. In 1978, George Strait and his Ace in the Hole Band performed for a Smithson Valley High School FFA event. Other performances include that of Clay Blaker, Gary P. Nunn, Johnny Rodriguez, Jerry Jeff Walker and Asleep at the Wheel, among others.
