= Comal, Texas =

- Unincorporated community
- Location within Texas Location within the United States
- Coordinates: 29°38′44″N 98°13′25″W
- Country: United States
- State: Texas
- County: Comal
- Elevation: 692 ft (211 m)
- Time zone: UTC-6 (Central (CST))
  - Summer (DST): UTC-5 (CDT)
- Area code: 830
- GNIS feature ID: 1333165

Comal is an unincorporated community in Comal County, Texas, United States. According to the Handbook of Texas, the community had a population of 40 in 2000. It is located within the Greater San Antonio area.

== History ==
Comal was established on the in 1846 along the Old San Antonio Road, and was turned into a section houses for the Missouri-Kansas-Texas Railroad at the turn of the 19th century. In the 1980s and 2000, the community's population was 40. It is also home to a St. Joseph's Church and cemetery.

== Geography ==
Comal is located on the Old San Antonio Road off Farm to Market Road 482, 8 mi (13 km) southwest of New Braunfels in southern Comal County.

== Education ==
Today, the community is served by the Comal Independent School District. It is zoned for Morningside Elementary School, Danville Middle School, and Davenport High School.
