= Honey Creek, Texas =

Unincorporated community in Comal County, Texas, United States

- Ghost town
- Location within Texas Location within the United States
- Coordinates: 29°48′19″N 98°30′04″W
- Country: United States
- State: Texas
- County: Comal
- Elevation: 12,394 ft (3,778 m)
- Time zone: UTC-6 (Central (CST))
  - Summer (DST): UTC-5 (CDT)
- GNIS feature ID: 1379952

Honey Creek is an unincorporated community and ghost town in Comal County, Texas, United States.

The Honey Creek Historic District is located in the community.

Honey Creek is located near another ghost town, Anhalt, Texas. Like Anhalt, Honey Creek was also settled by German immigrants. St. Joseph Catholic Church was first established here in 1876 and still serves the remaining families and congregation in the area.

== See also ==
- List of unincorporated communities in Texas
