= Solms, Texas =

Unincorporated community in Comal County, Texas, US

- Unincorporated area#United States:Unincorporated community
- Location within Texas Location within the United States
- Coordinates: 29°39′57″N 98°10′15″W
- Country: United States
- State: Texas
- County: Comal
- Elevation: 663 ft (202 m)
- Time zone: UTC-6 (Central (CST))
  - Summer (DST): UTC-5 (CDT)
- Area code: 830
- GNIS feature ID: 1347369

Solms is an unincorporated community in Comal County, Texas, United States. According to the Handbook of Texas, the community had a population of 40 in 2000. It is located within the Greater San Antonio area.

== Geography ==
Solms is located on Farm to Market Road 482, 4 mi (6.4 km) southwest of New Braunfels in southern Comal County.

== Education ==
In 1902, the Four Mile Creek, Three Mile Creek, and Comal Creek Schools came together to make Solms School. Today, the community is served by the Comal Independent School District. It is zoned for Morningside Elementary School, Danville Middle School, and Davenport High School.

== See also ==
- List of unincorporated communities in Texas
