= Startzville, Texas =

Neighborhood within the Canyon Lake census-designated place in Comal County, Texas

- Neighborhood and former Unincorporated place
- Location within Texas Location within the United States
- Coordinates: 29°50′41″N 98°16′26″W
- Country: United States
- State: Texas
- County: Comal
- Elevation: 1,040 ft (320 m)
- Time zone: UTC-6 (Central (CST))
  - Summer (DST): UTC-5 (CDT)
- Area code: 830
- GNIS feature ID: 1369131

Startzville is a neighborhood within the Canyon Lake census-designated place in Comal County, Texas, United States. According to the Handbook of Texas, the community had a population of 30 in 2000. It is located within the Greater San Antonio area.

== History ==
On April 20, 2023, a high-end EF0 tornado near Startzville inflicted minor roof or siding damage to some homes and snapped or uprooted many trees.

== Geography ==
Startzville is located on Farm to Market Road 2673, 13 mi (21 km) northwest of New Braunfels in central Comal County. It is now located within the Canyon Lake CDP as of 2018. It is also on Farm to Market Road 311.

== Education ==
Today, the community is served by the Comal Independent School District. It is zoned for Startzville Elementary School, Mountain Valley Middle School, and Canyon Lake High School.
