= Hotel Faust =

- U.S. National Register of Historic Places
- Recorded Texas Historic Landmark
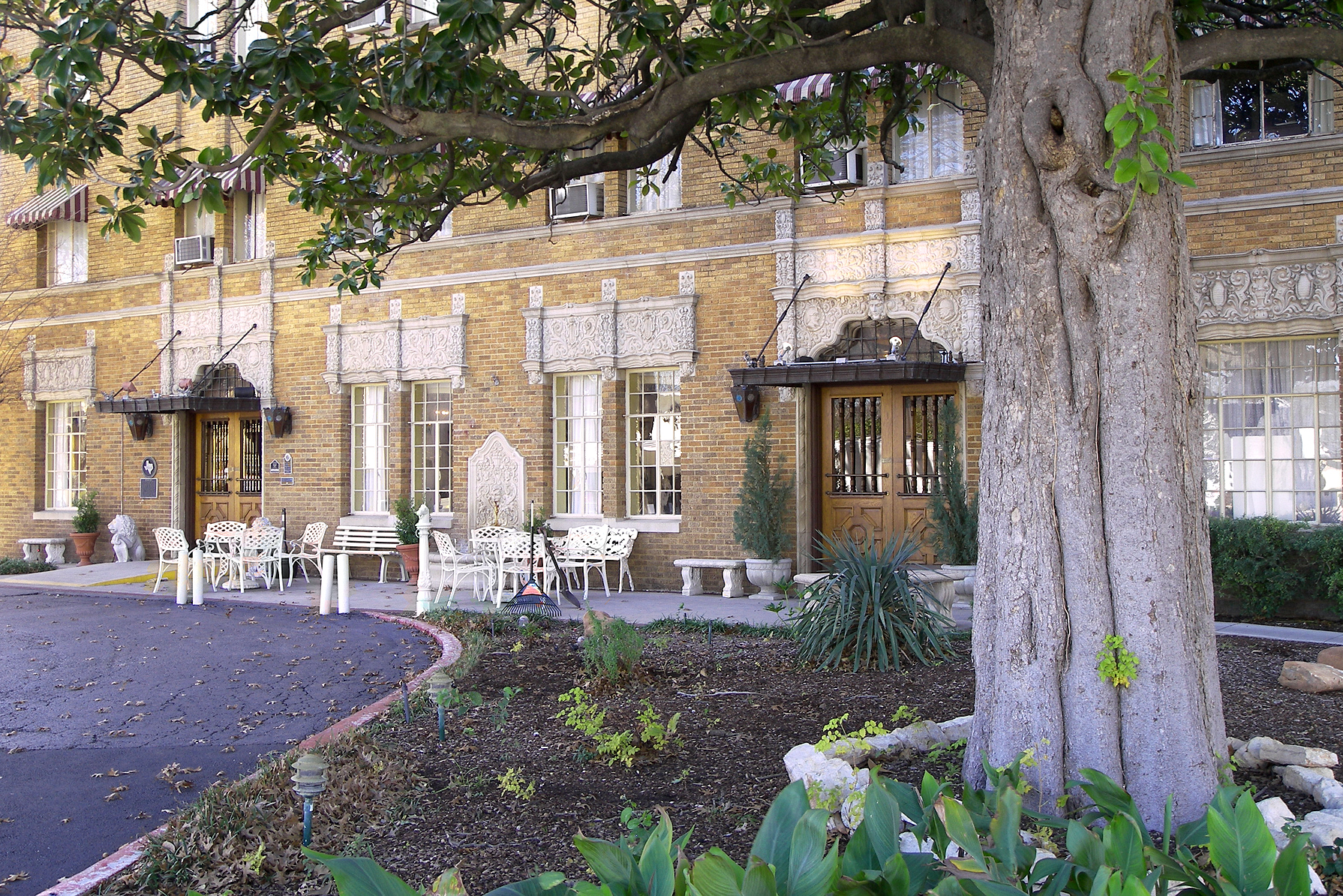
- Hotel Faust in 2012

- Location within Texas Location within the United States
- Location: 240 S. Seguin St., New Braunfels, Texas
- Coordinates: 29°42′36″N 98°7′25″W
- Area: less than one acre
- Built: 1929
- Built by: Walter Sipple
- Architect: Harvey Partridge Smith
- NRHP reference No.: 85000922
- RTHL No.: 1577

Significant dates
- Added to NRHP: May 2, 1985
- Designated RTHL: 1984

The Faust Hotel, once known as the Travelers Hotel, was completed in 1929 and is located in New Braunfels, Texas. The hotel planning was started by a group of citizens desiring to attract tourist and convention traffic to counter a downturn in agricultural business caused by a mid-1920s drought in the area. Built on donated land from Senator Joseph Faust's estate, the hotel was renamed in 1936 in honor that family. The building is a four-story masonry design of no particular architectural style, though with some Spanish Renaissance Revival detailing.

It has been renovated several times through the years, but is one of the few known Texas mid-rise hotels of its era still serving as a hotel. It was listed on the National Register of Historic Places in 1985.

Not to be confused with Hotel Faust (now Hotel Giles since 2015) in Comfort, Texas.

== See also ==
- National Register of Historic Places listings in Comal County, Texas
- Recorded Texas Historic Landmarks in Comal County
