= Wesson (surname) =

Wesson is the surname of the following people

- Amy Wesson (born 1977), American fashion model
- Andre Wesson (born 1997), American basketball player
- Barry Wesson (born 1977), American baseball outfielder
- Cynthia Wesson (1886–1981), American athlete, coach, physical educator, granddaughter of Daniel B. Wesson
- Daniel B. Wesson (1825–1906), co-inventor of the Winchester rifle and co-founder of Smith & Wesson
- Daniel B. Wesson II (1916–1978), great-grandson of Daniel B. Wesson, founder Dan Wesson Firearms
- Dick Wesson (announcer) (1919–1979), American film and television announcer
- Dick Wesson (actor) (1919–1996), American character actor, comedian, comedy writer and producer
- Edward Wesson (1910–1983), English watercolour artist
- George Wesson Hawes (1848–1882), American geologist
- Herb Wesson (born 1951), American politician
- Jessica Wesson (born 1982), American actress
- Kaleb Wesson (born 1999), American basketball player
- K'zell Wesson (born 1977), American basketball player
- Marcus Wesson (born 1946), American mass murderer
- Mel Wesson (born 1958), British film, TV and video game composer
- Paul S. Wesson (1949-2015), American physicist
- Tina Wesson (born 1960), American nurse and television personality
- Will Wesson (born 1986), American freestyle skier
