= Anholt =

Anholt may refer to:

== Places ==
- Anholt (Denmark), Danish island
- Anholt, Netherlands, village in Drenthe, Netherlands
- Anholt, Germany, district of the city of Isselburg, Germany
  - The Lordship of Anholt, historical state

== People ==
- Christien Anholt (born 1971), British stage, television and film actor
- Darrell Anholt (born 1962), Canadian ice hockey player
- Laurence Anholt (born 1959), British author/illustrator
- Pele van Anholt (born 1991), Dutch footballer
- Simon Anholt, independent policy advisor
- Tony Anholt (1941–2002), British actor (father of Christien Anholt)

== See also ==
- Battle of Anholt, an 1811 battle between the UK and Denmark-Norway in the Gunboat War
- Saxony-Anhalt, a state of Germany
