= Hunter, Texas =

Unincorporated community in Comal County, Texas, United States

- Unincorporated community
- Location within Texas Location within the United States
- Coordinates: 29°48′26″N 98°01′25″W
- Country: United States
- State: Texas
- County: Comal
- Elevation: 627 ft (191 m)
- Time zone: UTC-6 (Central (CST))
  - Summer (DST): UTC-5 (CDT)
- Area code: 830
- GNIS feature ID: 1359837

Hunter is an unincorporated community in Comal County, Texas, United States. According to the Handbook of Texas, the community had a population of 30 in 2000. It is located within the greater San Marcos area.

== Geography ==
Hunter is located at the intersection of Farm to Market Roads 1102 and 2439, 8 mi (13 km) north of New Braunfels in eastern Comal County on York's Creek.

== Education ==
Hunter had a one-room school with ten students as of 1949, and was a member of the New Braunfels district. Today, the community is served by the Comal Independent School District. It is zoned for Oak Creek Elementary School, Canyon Middle School, and Canyon High School.

== See also ==
- List of unincorporated communities in Texas
