= Wesson, Texas =

- Ghost town
- Country: United States
- State: Texas
- County: Comal

Population
  - Total: 0
- Time zone: UTC-6 (Central (CST))
  - Summer (DST): UTC-5 (CDT)

Wesson is a ghost town in Comal County, Texas, United States.

== History ==
The original name was Henderson Crossing, after Hensley G. Henderson, an early settler. The name was changed to Esser Crossing after Charles Esser. The official name of Wesson was chosen in the 1890s, in honor of the weapons manufacturer.
