= Smithson Valley, Texas =

Neighborhood within the Canyon Lake census-designated place in Comal County, Texas

- Neighborhood, former census-designated place
- Location within Texas Location within the United States
- Coordinates: 29°48′47″N 98°20′14″W
- Country: United States
- State: Texas
- County: Comal
- Elevation: 1,289 ft (393 m)
- Time zone: UTC-6 (Central (CST))
  - Summer (DST): UTC-5 (CDT)
- Area code: 830
- GNIS feature ID: 1380562

Smithson Valley is a neighborhood within the Canyon Lake census-designated place in Comal County, Texas, United States. According to the Handbook of Texas, the community had a population of 15 in 2000. It is located within the Greater San Antonio area.

== History ==
A post office which operated in a resident's house, called Smithson Valley—named for local settler Ben Smithson—operated from 1857 to 1940. A school operated from 1875 until being consolidated by another local school in 1940. An agricultural economy with logging as its primary industry, it expanded by the 1880s to include a dance hall, cotton gin and saloon. The town declined through most of the 20th century, having a population between 15 and 25 during the 1920s, but growth continued since the 1990s, due to new residents of San Antonio.

== Geography ==
Smithson Valley is located on Farm to Market Road 311, 15 mi (24 km) northwest of New Braunfels in central Comal County.

=== Climate ===
The climate in this area is characterized by hot, humid summers and generally mild to cool winters. According to the Köppen Climate Classification system, Smithson Valley has a humid subtropical climate.

== Education ==
The first school in Smithson Valley was built in 1875. As of 2007, it had a highschool with over 2,500 students. It is also zoned for Bill Brown Elementary School.

== Notable person ==
- Logan Cunningham (born 1991), pole vaulter.
