= Canyon Lake, Texas =

- CDP
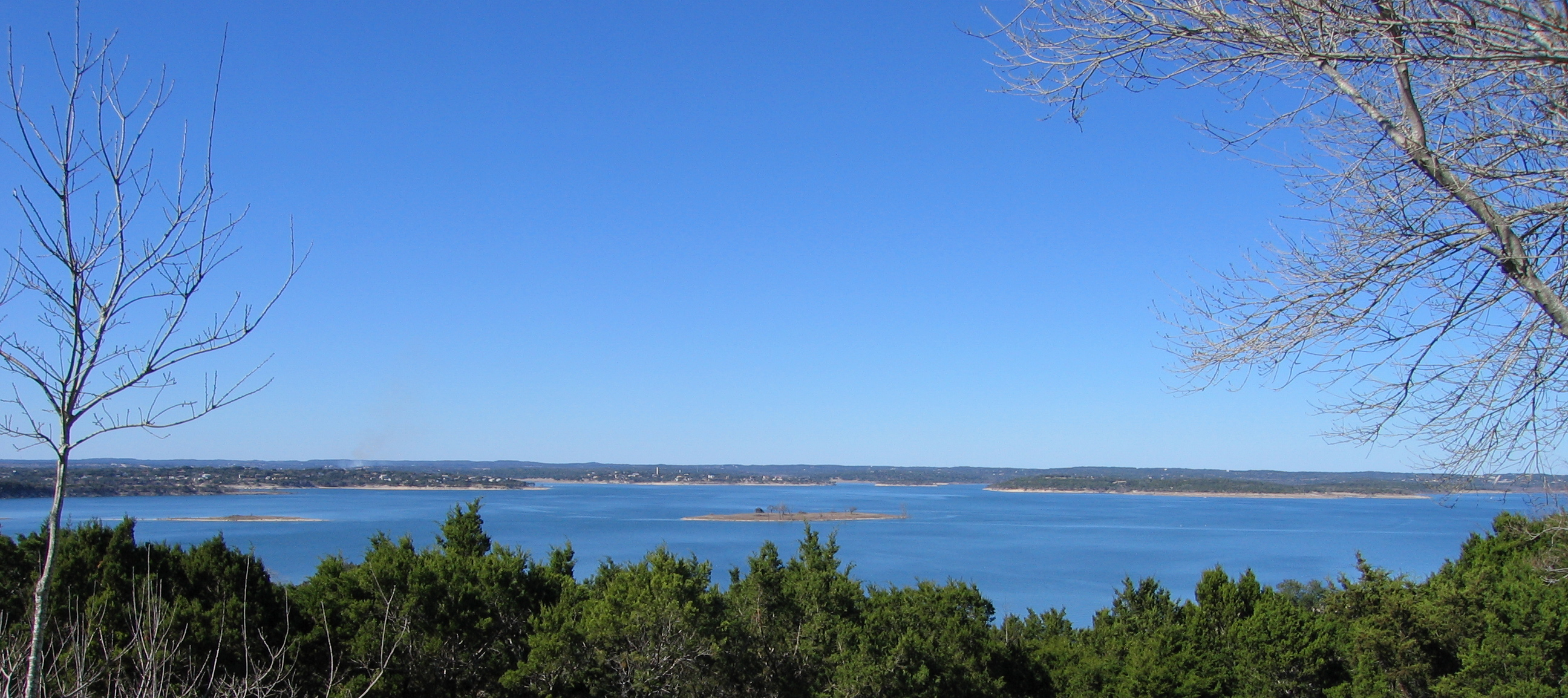
- Nickname: The Water Recreation Capital of Texas
- Location of Canyon Lake, Texas
- Coordinates: 29°52′34″N 98°15′40″W
- Country: United States
- State: Texas
- County: Comal

Area
  - Total: 156.9 sq mi (406.3 km^{2})
  - Land: 144.2 sq mi (373.6 km^{2})
  - Water: 12.6 sq mi (32.7 km^{2})
- Elevation: 955 ft (291 m)

Population (2020)
  - Total: 31,124
  - Density: 117/sq mi (45.2/km^{2})
- Time zone: UTC-6 (Central (CST))
  - Summer (DST): UTC-5 (CDT)
- ZIP Codes: 78130, 78132,78133
- Area code: 830
- FIPS code: 48-12580
- GNIS feature ID: 2407957

Canyon Lake is a census-designated place (CDP) in Comal County, Texas, United States. The population was 31,124 at the 2020 census. It is part of the San Antonio Metropolitan Statistical Area.

The Canyon Lake CDP includes a number of small, unincorporated communities surrounding Canyon Lake, including Sattler, Startzville, Canyon City, Cranes Mill, and Hancock. Communities located on the fringes of the CDP are Fischer, Spring Branch, and Smithson Valley.

== History ==
Residential and commercial development of the area began after the completion of Canyon Lake in 1964. By 1980, the population was 100, rising to 9,975 in 1990.

== Geography ==
Canyon Lake, Texas, is located adjacent to Canyon Lake, from which it takes its name. It is located about 20 miles (32 km) north-by-northwest of New Braunfels and approximately 40 miles (64 km) north-by-northeast of Downtown San Antonio.

According to the United States Census Bureau, the CDP has a total area of 156.9 square miles (406 km^{2}), of which 144.3 square miles (374 km^{2}) is land and 12.6 square miles (33 km^{2}) (8.04%) is water.

== Demographics ==
Historical population
Census	Pop.	Note	%±
1990	9,975		—
2000	16,870		69.1%
2010	21,262		26.0%
2020	31,124		46.4%
U.S. Decennial Census; 1850–1900 1910; 1920 1930 1940; 1950 1960 1970; 1980 1990 2000; 2010 2020

Canyon Lake first appeared as a census designated place in the 1990 U.S. census.

=== Racial and ethnic composition ===
Canyon Lake CDP, Texas – Racial and ethnic composition Note: the US Census treats Hispanic/Latino as an ethnic category. This table excludes Latinos from the racial categories and assigns them to a separate category. Hispanics/Latinos may be of any race.
Race / Ethnicity (NH = Non-Hispanic)	Pop 2000	Pop 2010	Pop 2020	% 2000	% 2010	% 2020
White alone (NH)	14,866	17,779	23,227	88.12%	83.62%	74.63%
Black or African American alone (NH)	52	133	365	0.31%	0.63%	1.17%
Native American or Alaska Native alone (NH)	79	98	113	0.47%	0.46%	0.36%
Asian alone (NH)	30	99	207	0.18%	0.47%	0.67%
Native Hawaiian or Pacific Islander alone (NH)	5	7	20	0.03%	0.03%	0.06%
Other race alone (NH)	11	26	184	0.07%	0.12%	0.59%
Mixed race or Multiracial (NH)	179	278	1,306	1.06%	1.31%	4.20%
Hispanic or Latino (any race)	1,648	2,842	5,702	9.77%	13.37%	18.32%
Total	16,870	21,262	31,124	100.00%	100.00%	100.00%

=== 2020 census ===
As of the 2020 census, Canyon Lake had a population of 31,124 and contained 12,967 households and 7,596 families. The median age was 51.4 years. 17.9% of residents were under the age of 18 and 25.2% of residents were 65 years of age or older. For every 100 females there were 100.9 males, and for every 100 females age 18 and over there were 99.3 males age 18 and over.

25.4% of residents lived in urban areas, while 74.6% lived in rural areas.

There were 12,967 households in Canyon Lake, of which 22.3% had children under the age of 18 living in them. Of all households, 58.6% were married-couple households, 16.7% were households with a male householder and no spouse or partner present, and 19.5% were households with a female householder and no spouse or partner present. About 24.3% of all households were made up of individuals and 11.9% had someone living alone who was 65 years of age or older.

There were 16,188 housing units, of which 19.9% were vacant. The homeowner vacancy rate was 1.9% and the rental vacancy rate was 12.4%.

Racial composition as of the 2020 census
Race	Number	Percent
White	25,060	80.5%
Black or African American	398	1.3%
American Indian and Alaska Native	219	0.7%
Asian	221	0.7%
Native Hawaiian and Other Pacific Islander	29	0.1%
Some other race	1,232	4.0%
Two or more races	3,965	12.7%
Hispanic or Latino (of any race)	5,702	18.3%

=== 2000 census ===
As of the census of 2000, there were 16,870 people, 6,906 households, and 5,055 families residing in the CDP. The population density was 116.9 inhabitants per square mile (45.1/km^{2}). There were 8,693 housing units at an average density of 60.3 per square mile (23.3/km^{2}). The racial makeup of the CDP was 94.86% White, 0.31% African American, 0.57% Native American, 0.18% Asian, 0.03% Pacific Islander, 2.49% from other races, and 1.55% from two or more races. Hispanic or Latino of any race were 9.77% of the population.

There were 6,906 households, out of which 27.0% had children under the age of 18 living with them, 62.0% were married couples living together, 7.5% had a female householder with no husband present, and 26.8% were non-families. 22.0% of all households were made up of individuals, and 8.8% had someone living alone who was 65 years of age or older. The average household size was 2.44 and the average family size was 2.81.

In the CDP, the population was spread out, with 22.4% under the age of 18, 5.4% from 18 to 24, 26.6% from 25 to 44, 28.1% from 45 to 64, and 17.5% who were 65 years of age or older. The median age was 42 years. For every 100 females, there were 98.9 males. For every 100 females age 18 and over, there were 97.3 males.

The median income for a household in the CDP was $42,019, and the median income for a family was $47,500. Males had a median income of $34,575 versus $25,268 for females. The per capita income for the CDP was $21,516. About 5.6% of families and 8.7% of the population were below the poverty line, including 14.4% of those under age 18 and 4.8% of those age 65 or over.

== Education ==
Canyon Lake is served by the Comal Independent School District.

Zoned schools:

- Bill Brown, Mountain Valley, Rebecca Creek, and Startzville elementaries
- Most residents are zoned to Mountain Valley Middle School while a few are zoned to Smithson Valley Middle School.
- Most residents are zoned to Canyon Lake High School while a few are zoned to Smithson Valley High School

== Canyon Lake Gorge ==
On October 7, 2007, the Guadalupe-Blanco River Authority opened the 64-acre (260,000 m^{2}) Canyon Lake Gorge, under a lease from the Army Corps of Engineers, with limited public tours. The three-hour tours are booked six months in advance.

== Climate ==
The climate in this area is characterized by hot, humid summers and generally mild to cool winters. According to the Köppen Climate Classification system, Canyon Lake has a humid subtropical climate, abbreviated "Cfa" on climate maps.
