= Maifest =

Traditional German spring festival

Maifest (or Mayfest in English) is the traditional German celebration of the arrival of spring. Maifest is celebrated throughout Germany with the maibaum (maypole) decorated to show off the history and crafts of the town.

Several communities in the United States celebrate Maifest yearly. It has been celebrated in Cincinnati, Ohio, since 1873. Brenham, Texas, has celebrated Maifest since 1880; the town celebrates with costumes and a parade. Maifest is treated as a town holiday in Brenham, with Brenham Independent School District releasing students early on the Friday before.
