= Canyon Lake High School =

Public school in Texas, United States

Location
- 8555 FM 32; Fischer, Texas 78623; United States
- 29.9436°N 98.2148°W

Information
- School type: Public high school
- Established: 2007
- School district: Comal Independent School District
- Principal: Mark Oberholtzer
- Teaching staff: 77.89 (FTE)
- Grades: 9-12
- Enrollment: 1,049 (2025–2026)
- Student to teacher ratio: 12.99
- Colors: Green and gold
- Athletics conference: UIL Class 4A
- Mascot: Hawk
- Website: clhs.comalisd.org

Canyon Lake High School (commonly referred to as CLHS) is a public high school in the Canyon Lake area located in unincorporated Comal County, Texas. It is part of the Comal Independent School District and is ranked as a 4A (or AAAA) high school by the UIL.

Canyon Lake High School is primarily zoned to serve students, grades 9–12, living in the northern and central parts of Comal County, including, Canyon Lake, Spring Branch, and Fischer.

== Athletics ==
The Canyon Lake Hawks compete in the following sports:

- Baseball
- Bowling
- Basketball
- Cheerleading
- Cross Country
- Dance
- Football
- Powerlifting
- Soccer
- Softball
- Swimming and Diving
- Tennis
- Track & Field
- Volleyball
- Wrestling
