= Comal County Courthouse =

- U.S. National Register of Historic Places
- Texas State Antiquities Landmark
- Recorded Texas Historic Landmark
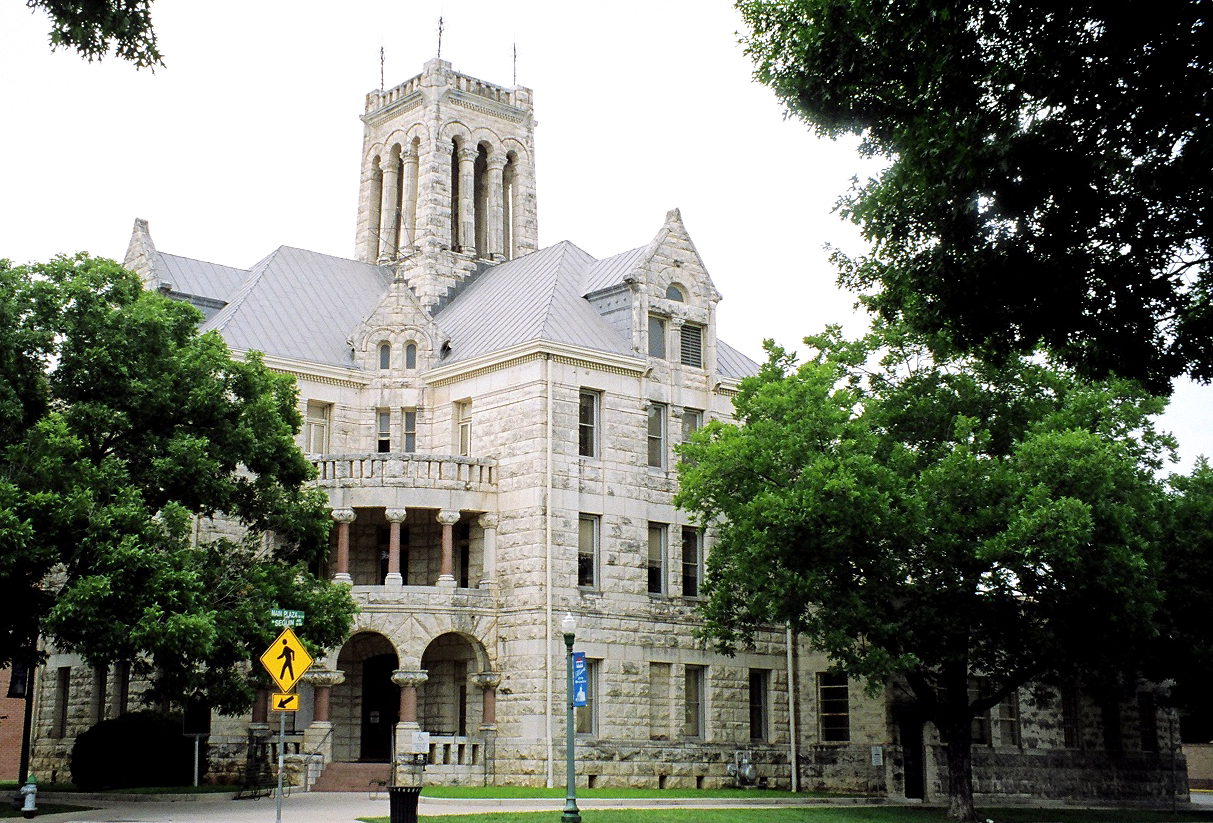
- Comal County Courthouse in 2006

- Location within Texas Location within the United States
- Location: 150 N. Seguin Ave., New Braunfels, Texas
- Coordinates: 29°42′12″N 98°7′29″W
- Area: 1 acre (0.40 ha)
- Built: 1897
- Architect: James Riely Gordon
- Architectural style: Romanesque
- NRHP reference No.: 76002017
- TSAL No.: 8200000175
- RTHL No.: 987

Significant dates
- Added to NRHP: December 12, 1976
- Designated TSAL: January 1, 1981
- Designated RTHL: 1993

The Comal County Courthouse is located in New Braunfels in the U.S. state of Texas. It was added to the National Register of Historic Places in Comal County, Texas in 1976 and designated a Recorded Texas Historic Landmark in 1993.

Comal County has had two courthouses. The first was designed by Wilhelm Thielepape and completed circa 1860, but had deteriorated in condition by the late 1890s. The current Romanesque Revival style courthouse was designed by James Riely Gordon and completed in 1898 by contractors Fischer and Lamie. Gordon, along with another San Antonio architect Albert Felix Beckmann, submitted bids to replace the courthouse designed by Thielepape. In addition to reviewing the bids, the county commissioners traveled to Gonzales to assess the architectural quality of the Gonzales County Courthouse, a work designed by Gordon and completed in 1896.

The courthouse was restored to its original appearance in 2013 after a three-year, $8.7 million undertaking that included removing two additions, and restoring or replicating paint, tile, doors and furniture. Atop the three-story building is a corniced stone tower.

== See also ==
- National Register of Historic Places listings in Comal County, Texas
- Recorded Texas Historic Landmarks in Comal County
- List of county courthouses in Texas
