= Comal County, Texas =

County in Texas, United States

- County
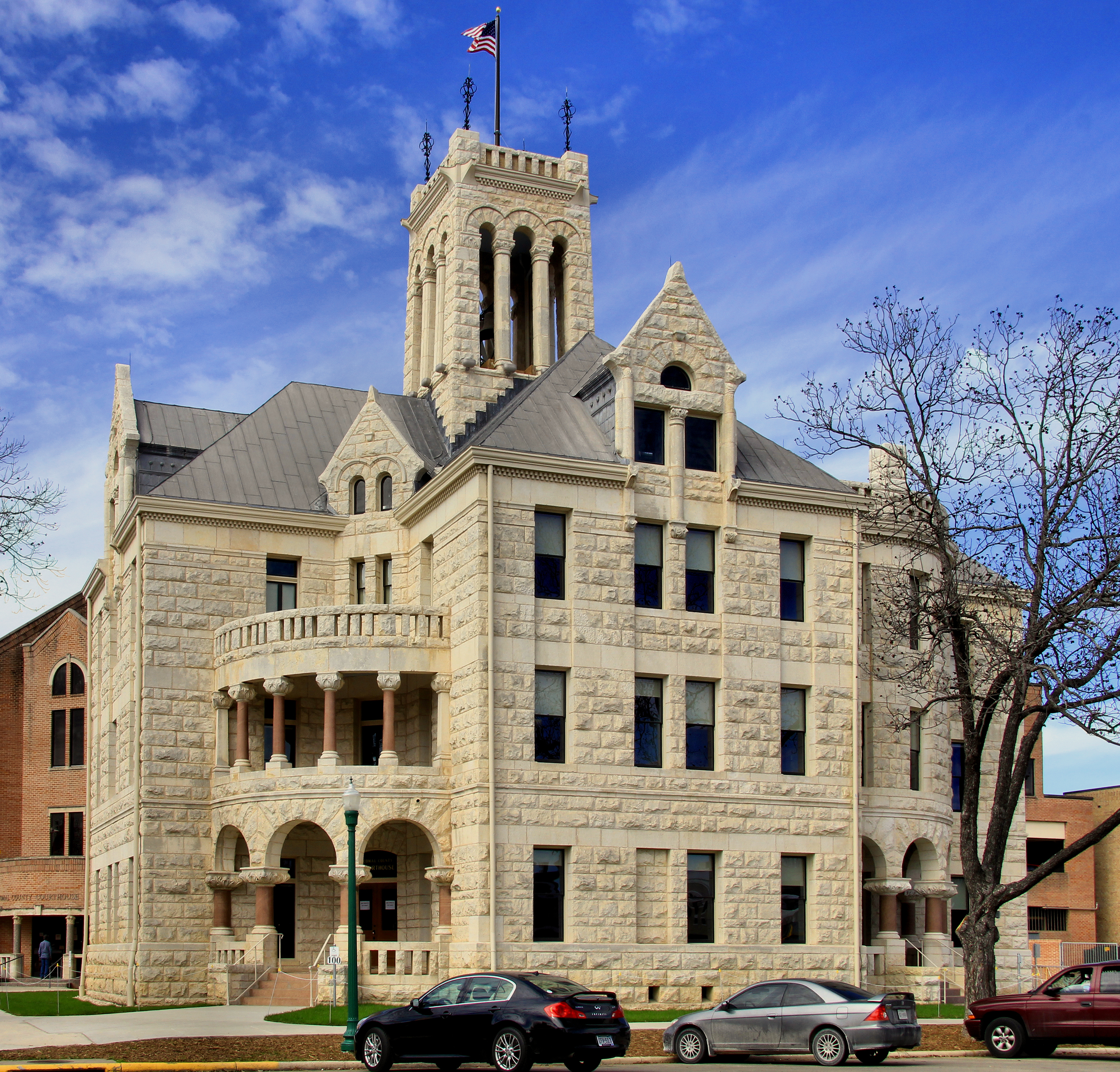
- The 3.5 story Romanesque Revival style Comal County Courthouse in New Braunfels was built in 1898.

- Seal

- Location within the U.S. state of Texas
- Coordinates: 29°49′N 98°17′W
- Country: United States
- State: Texas
- Founded: 1846
- Seat: New Braunfels
- Largest city: New Braunfels

Area
  - Total: 575 sq mi (1,490 km^{2})
  - Land: 559 sq mi (1,450 km^{2})
  - Water: 15 sq mi (39 km^{2}) 2.7%

Population (2020)
  - Total: 161,501
  - Estimate (2025): 209,166 ▲
  - Density: 289/sq mi (112/km^{2})
- Time zone: UTC−6 (Central)
  - Summer (DST): UTC−5 (CDT)
- Congressional districts: 21st, 35th
- Website: www.comalcounty.gov

Comal County (/ˈkoʊmæl/ KOH-mal) is a county located on the Edwards Plateau in the U.S. state of Texas. As of the 2020 census, its population was 161,501. Comal County lies in the Texas German belt region, an area settled by German settlers in the 1800s, many cities and towns have German names, and many residents are descendents of the settlers. Its county seat is New Braunfels.

Comal County is part of the San Antonio-New Braunfels, TX metropolitan statistical area.

Along with Hays and Kendall counties, Comal was listed in 2017 as one of the nation's 10 fastest-growing counties with populations of at least 10,000.

== History ==
- Early native American inhabitants include Tonkawa, Waco, Karankawa, and Lipan Apache.
- 1700-1758 The area becomes known as "Comal", Mexican Spanish for "flat griddle". Nuestra Senora de Guadalupe Mission at Comal Springs.
- 1825 Coahuila y Tejas issues land grant for Comal Springs to Juan Martín de Veramendi.
- 1842 Adelsverein organized in Germany to promote emigration to Texas. Fisher-Miller Land Grant sets aside three million acres (12,000 km^{2}) to settle 600 families and single men of German, Dutch, Swiss, Danish, Swedish, and Norwegian ancestry in Texas.
- 1844, June 26 - Henry Francis Fisher sells interest in land grant to Adelsverein.
- 1845 Prince Carl of Solms-Braunfels secures title to 1,265 acres (5.12 km^{2}) of the Veramendi grant, including the Comal Springs and River, for the Adelsverein. Thousands of German immigrants are stranded at port of disembarkation Indianaola on Matagorda Bay. With no food or shelters, living in holes dug into the ground, an estimated 50% die from disease or starvation. The living begin to walk to their destinations hundreds of miles away. 200 German colonists who walked from Indianola found the town of New Braunfels at the crossing of the San Antonio-Nacogdoches Road on the Guadalupe River. John O. Meusebach arrives in Galveston.
- 1846 March - Texas legislature forms Comal County from the Eighth Precinct of Bexar County. New Braunfels is the county seat.
- 1850 Survey of 130 German farms in Comal reveals no slave laborers.
- 1852 Neu-Braunfelser Zeitung begins publication, initially only in German, deriving its name from 16th-century Germany's prototype of a newspaper titled Zeitung.
- 1854 County is divided into eight public school districts. The Texas State Convention of Germans meet in San Antonio and adopt a political, social and religious platform, including: 1) Equal pay for equal work; 2) Direct election of the President of the United States; 3) Abolition of capital punishment; 4) "Slavery is an evil, the abolition of which is a requirement of democratic principles.."; 5) Free schools – including universities - supported by the state, without religious influence; and 6) Total separation of church and state.
- 1858 Final county boundaries determination with the separation of part of western Comal County to Blanco and Kendall counties. New Braunfels votes in a school tax.
- 1861 Comal County votes for secession from the Union. Contributes three all-German volunteer companies to the Confederate cause.
- 1887 Faust Street Bridge built over the Guadalupe River.
- 1898 Comal County limestone courthouse erected. Romanesque Revival style. Architect James Riely Gordon.
- 1920s County establishes itself as a manufacturing and shipping center for textiles, garments, flour, and construction materials.
- 1924 Presidential candidate Robert M. LaFollette received his highest vote percentage of any county in the 48 states, 73.96%, in Comal.
- 1960 Four students at St. Mary's University San Antonio discover Natural Bridge Caverns, the largest known commercial caverns in the state of Texas.
- 1961 Comal's first Wurstfest draws a crowd of 2,000.
- 1964 Canyon Lake impoundment, boosting tourism and related industries.

== Darmstadt Society of Forty ==
Count Castell of the Adelsverein negotiated with the separate Darmstadt Society of Forty to colonize 200 families on the Fisher–Miller Land Grant territory in Texas. In return, they were to receive $12,000 in money, livestock, and equipment, and provisions for a year. After the first year, the colonies were expected to support themselves. The colonies attempted were Castell, Leiningen, Bettina, Schoenburg, and Meerholz in Llano County; Darmstädler Farm in Comal County; and Tusculum in Kendall County. Of these, only Castell survives. The colonies failed after the Adelsverein funding expired, and also due to conflict of structure and authorities. Some members moved to other Adelsverein settlements in Texas. Others moved elsewhere, or returned to Germany.

== Geography ==
According to the U.S. Census Bureau, the county has a total area of 575 square miles (1,490 km^{2}), of which 15 sq mi (39 km^{2}) (2.7%) are covered by water.

The Balcones Escarpment runs northeastward through the county, generally just west of Interstate 35. West of the escarpment are the rocky hills and canyons of the Texas Hill Country; to the east are the rolling grasslands of the coastal plains.

The Guadalupe River flows generally southeastward through the county, and is impounded by Canyon Lake. The Comal River rises from the Comal Springs in New Braunfels, and quickly joins the Guadalupe River.

=== Adjacent counties ===
- Hays County (north)
- Blanco County (northwest)
- Guadalupe County (southeast)
- Bexar County (southwest)
- Kendall County (west)

== Transportation ==
=== Major highways ===
- Interstate 35
  - I-35 BL (New Braunfels)
- U.S. Highway 281
- State Highway 46
- Loop 337

=== Airports ===
- New Braunfels
- Spring Branch (Kestrel)

== Demographics ==
Historical population
Census	Pop.	Note	%±
1850	1,723		—
1860	4,030		133.9%
1870	5,283		31.1%
1880	5,546		5.0%
1890	6,398		15.4%
1900	7,008		9.5%
1910	8,434		20.3%
1920	8,824		4.6%
1930	11,984		35.8%
1940	12,321		2.8%
1950	16,357		32.8%
1960	19,844		21.3%
1970	24,165		21.8%
1980	36,446		50.8%
1990	51,832		42.2%
2000	78,021		50.5%
2010	108,472		39.0%
2020	161,501		48.9%
2025 (est.)	209,166	▲	29.5%
U.S. Decennial Census; 1850–2010 2010 2020

=== Racial and ethnic composition ===
Comal County, Texas – Racial and ethnic composition Note: the US Census treats Hispanic/Latino as an ethnic category. This table excludes Latinos from the racial categories and assigns them to a separate category. Hispanics/Latinos may be of any race.
Race / Ethnicity (NH = Non-Hispanic)	Pop 1980	Pop 1990	Pop 2000	Pop 2010	Pop 2020	% 1980	% 1990	% 2000	% 2010	% 2020
White alone (NH)	27,183	39,233	58,345	77,387	105,250	74.58%	75.69%	74.78%	71.34%	65.17%
Black or African American alone (NH)	373	421	693	1,606	3,584	1.02%	0.81%	0.89%	1.48%	2.22%
Native American or Alaska Native alone (NH)	79	108	268	355	514	0.22%	0.21%	0.34%	0.33%	0.32%
Asian alone (NH)	33	145	343	813	1,844	0.09%	0.28%	0.44%	0.75%	1.14%
Native Hawaiian or Pacific Islander alone (NH)	x	x	21	45	127	x	x	0.03%	0.04%	0.08%
Other race alone (NH)	50	61	77	105	700	0.14%	0.12%	0.10%	0.10%	0.43%
Mixed race or Multiracial (NH)	x	x	665	1,172	5,892	x	x	0.85%	1.08%	3.65%
Hispanic or Latino (any race)	8,728	11,864	17,609	26,989	43,590	23.95%	22.89%	22.57%	24.88%	26.99%
Total	36,446	51,832	78,021	108,472	161,501	100.00%	100.00%	100.00%	100.00%	100.00%

=== 2020 census ===
As of the 2020 census, the county had a population of 161,501. The median age was 43.5 years, with 21.7% of residents under the age of 18 and 20.1% of residents 65 years of age or older. For every 100 females there were 96.5 males, and for every 100 females age 18 and over there were 94.4 males age 18 and over.

The racial makeup of the county was 73.2% White, 2.4% Black or African American, 0.7% American Indian and Alaska Native, 1.2% Asian, 0.1% Native Hawaiian and Pacific Islander, 6.2% from some other race, and 16.1% from two or more races. Hispanic or Latino residents of any race comprised 27.0% of the population.

53.4% of residents lived in urban areas, while 46.6% lived in rural areas.

There were 62,232 households in the county, of which 29.8% had children under the age of 18 living in them. Of all households, 58.6% were married-couple households, 15.0% were households with a male householder and no spouse or partner present, and 21.0% were households with a female householder and no spouse or partner present. About 22.5% of all households were made up of individuals and 10.1% had someone living alone who was 65 years of age or older.

There were 69,939 housing units, of which 11.0% were vacant. Among occupied housing units, 75.1% were owner-occupied and 24.9% were renter-occupied. The homeowner vacancy rate was 1.7% and the rental vacancy rate was 10.1%.

=== 2010 census ===
As of the 2010 census, there were 108,472 people, 29,066 households, and 21,886 families residing in the county. The population density was 139 people per square mile (54 people/km^{2}). There were 32,718 housing units at an average density of 58 units per square mile (22/km^{2}). The racial makeup of the county was 89.08% White, 0.95% Black or African American, 0.53% Native American, 0.46% Asian, 0.03% Pacific Islander, 6.98% from other races, and 1.96% from two or more races. 22.57% of the population were Hispanic or Latino of any race.

There were 29,066 households, out of which 33.30% had children under the age of 18 living with them, 62.80% were married couples living together, 9.00% had a female householder with no husband present, and 24.70% were non-families. 20.60% of all households were made up of individuals, and 9.00% had someone living alone who was 65 years of age or older. The average household size was 2.64 and the average family size was 3.05.

A Williams Institute analysis of 2010 census data found there were about 4.4 same-sex couples per 1,000 households in the county.

In the county, the population was spread out, with 25.50% under the age of 18, 7.00% from 18 to 24, 27.50% from 25 to 44, 25.20% from 45 to 64, and 14.80% who were 65 years of age or older. The median age was 39 years. For every 100 females, there were 96.00 males. For every 100 females age 18 and over, there were 93.20 males.

The median income for a household in the county was $46,147, and the median income for a family was $52,455. Males had a median income of $36,048 versus $25,940 for females. The per capita income for the county was $21,914. About 6.40% of families and 8.60% of the population were below the poverty line, including 11.50% of those under age 18 and 7.30% of those age 65 or over.

== Politics ==
Comal is a strongly Republican county: the last Democrat to carry it being Texan Lyndon B. Johnson in 1964, and no others have done so since Franklin Roosevelt's 1936 landslide when he won every Texas county bar traditionally Unionist Gillespie and Kendall and took 87.31 percent of the Lone Star State's vote. LBJ's victory in 1964 is the last time a Democrat has managed even 40 percent of the county's vote.

In earlier periods, the county's German heritage meant it often deviated from a "Solid South" voting pattern. In 1924 Robert M. La Follette won 73.96 percent of Comal County's vote (versus 6.52 percent for all of Texas), which made it his strongest county nationwide, and in 1920 American candidate James "Pa" Ferguson carried the county with 841 votes to 765 for Warren G. Harding.

United States presidential election results for Comal County, Texas
Year	Republican		Democratic		Third party(ies)	
Year	No.	%	No.	%	No.	%
1912	157	16.83%	602	64.52%	174	18.65%
1916	743	61.25%	432	35.61%	38	3.13%
1920	765	42.03%	181	9.95%	874	48.02%
1924	312	12.66%	330	13.39%	1,823	73.96%
1928	508	21.14%	1,893	78.78%	2	0.08%
1932	176	7.33%	2,211	92.05%	15	0.62%
1936	554	25.52%	1,611	74.21%	6	0.28%
1940	1,852	68.44%	851	31.45%	3	0.11%
1944	2,021	67.61%	787	26.33%	181	6.06%
1948	1,752	56.99%	1,212	39.43%	110	3.58%
1952	3,350	72.73%	1,252	27.18%	4	0.09%
1956	3,397	74.54%	1,140	25.02%	20	0.44%
1960	3,082	62.38%	1,845	37.34%	14	0.28%
1964	2,223	37.84%	3,644	62.03%	8	0.14%
1968	3,646	54.34%	2,338	34.84%	726	10.82%
1972	6,761	78.36%	1,823	21.13%	44	0.51%
1976	6,377	60.42%	4,068	38.54%	109	1.03%
1980	9,758	71.15%	3,554	25.92%	402	2.93%
1984	13,452	76.07%	4,179	23.63%	52	0.29%
1988	13,994	70.04%	5,716	28.61%	270	1.35%
1992	12,651	50.72%	6,312	25.31%	5,978	23.97%
1996	16,763	64.33%	7,132	27.37%	2,162	8.30%
2000	24,599	75.12%	7,131	21.78%	1,018	3.11%
2004	31,574	76.93%	9,153	22.30%	316	0.77%
2008	35,233	73.01%	12,384	25.66%	644	1.33%
2012	39,318	76.30%	11,450	22.22%	761	1.48%
2016	45,136	72.59%	14,238	22.90%	2,804	4.51%
2020	62,740	70.58%	24,826	27.93%	1,326	1.49%
2024	74,756	72.23%	27,680	26.75%	1,055	1.02%

United States Senate election results for Comal County, Texas1
Year	Republican		Democratic		Third party(ies)	
Year	No.	%	No.	%	No.	%
2024	71,757	69.45%	29,149	28.21%	2,418	2.34%

United States Senate election results for Comal County, Texas2
Year	Republican		Democratic		Third party(ies)	
Year	No.	%	No.	%	No.	%
2020	63,545	71.99%	22,552	25.55%	2,173	2.46%
2026	56,728	63.64%	30,670	34.41%	1,745	1.96%

Texas Gubernatorial election results for Comal County
Year	Republican		Democratic		Third party(ies)	
Year	No.	%	No.	%	No.	%
2022	54,503	72.90%	19,195	25.67%	1,065	1.42%
2026	58,907	65.90%	28,998	32.44%	1,481	1.66%

The county is part of the 21st District in the United States House of Representatives, represented by Republican Chip Roy, the 25th district of the Texas State Senate, represented by Republican Donna Campbell, and the 73rd District of the Texas House of Representatives and is represented by Republican Carrie Isaac.

== Communities ==
=== Cities (multiple counties) ===
- Fair Oaks Ranch (partly in Bexar and Kendall counties)
- New Braunfels (county seat) (mostly in Comal County but also in Guadalupe County)
- San Antonio (mostly in Bexar County and a small part in Medina County)
- Schertz (partly in Guadalupe and Bexar counties)
- Selma (mostly in Bexar and Guadalupe counties)

=== Cities ===
- Bulverde
- Garden Ridge
- Spring Branch

=== Census-designated place ===
- Canyon Lake

=== Other unincorporated communities ===
- Bracken
- Canyon City
- Comal
- Fischer
- Hunter
- Sattler
- Smithson Valley
- Solms
- Startzville

=== Ghost towns ===
- Anhalt
- Cranes Mill
- Dittlinger
- Freiheit
- Gruene
- Honey Creek
- Oak Cliff Acres
- Ogden
- Royal Forest
- Silver Hills
- Valley View
- Wesson

== Education ==
School districts in Comal County:

- Boerne Independent School District
- Comal Independent School District
- New Braunfels Independent School District
- Wimberley Independent School District

All of the county is in the service area of Alamo Community College District.

== See also ==
- Comal County Sheriff's Office
- Adelsverein
- German Texan
- Honey Creek (Texas)
- List of museums in Central Texas
- National Register of Historic Places listings in Comal County, Texas
- Recorded Texas Historic Landmarks in Comal County
