= Natural Bridge Wildlife Ranch =

Safari park in San Antonio, Texas

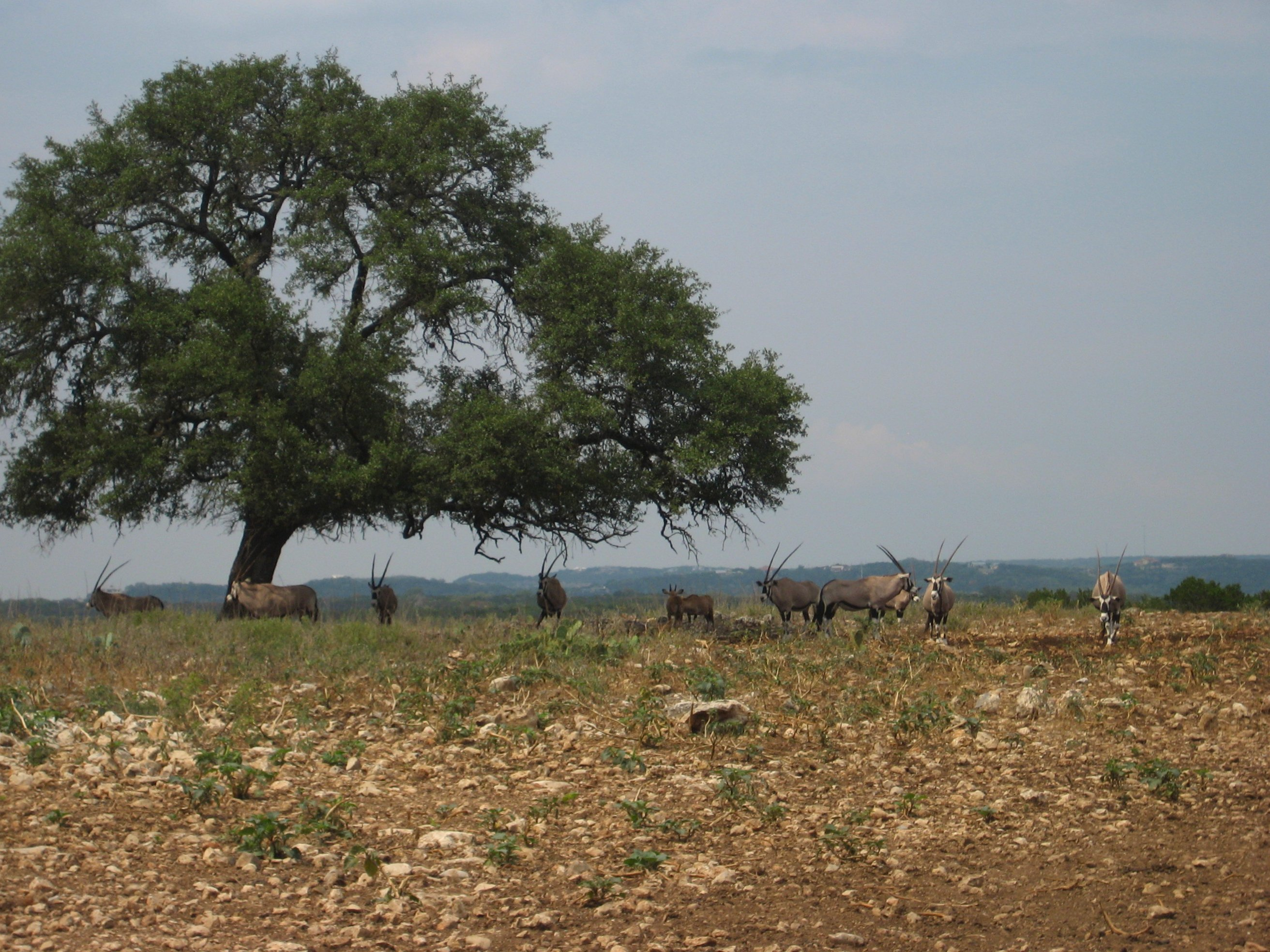
- Interactive map of Natural Bridge Wildlife Ranch
- 29.69421°N 98.33567°W,
- Date opened: June 1, 1984
- Location: San Antonio, Texas
- Land area: 400 acres (160 ha)
- No. of animals: 500
- No. of species: 40+
- Website: www.wildliferanchtexas.com

Natural Bridge Wildlife Ranch is a drive-thru safari park located between San Antonio and Austin, Texas. The ranch is a Texas Land Heritage Property, certified by the State of Texas for being used for agriculture by the same family for over 100 years. It comprises over 400 acres (160 ha) of Texas Hill Country publicly accessible by automobile.

It is not affiliated with the Natural Bridge Caverns.

== Animals ==
Natural Bridge Wildlife Ranch provides habitat for more than 500 animals representing more than 40 species. The owners, Ray and Trudy Soechting, obtained some animals from zoos, and others were purchased from exotic animal breeders or imported.

Some of the animals at the ranch include:

- Addax
- Ankole-Watusi
- Axis deer
- Barbary sheep
- Blue bull
- Blesbok
- Eland antelope
- Elk
- Emu
- Gazelle
- Giraffe
- Greater Kudu
- Gnu
- Llama
- Oryx
- Ostrich
- Sitka deer
- Springbok antelope
- Tibetan snowcock
- Waterbuck
- Wildebeest
- Yak
- Zebra
