= Natural Bridge Caverns =

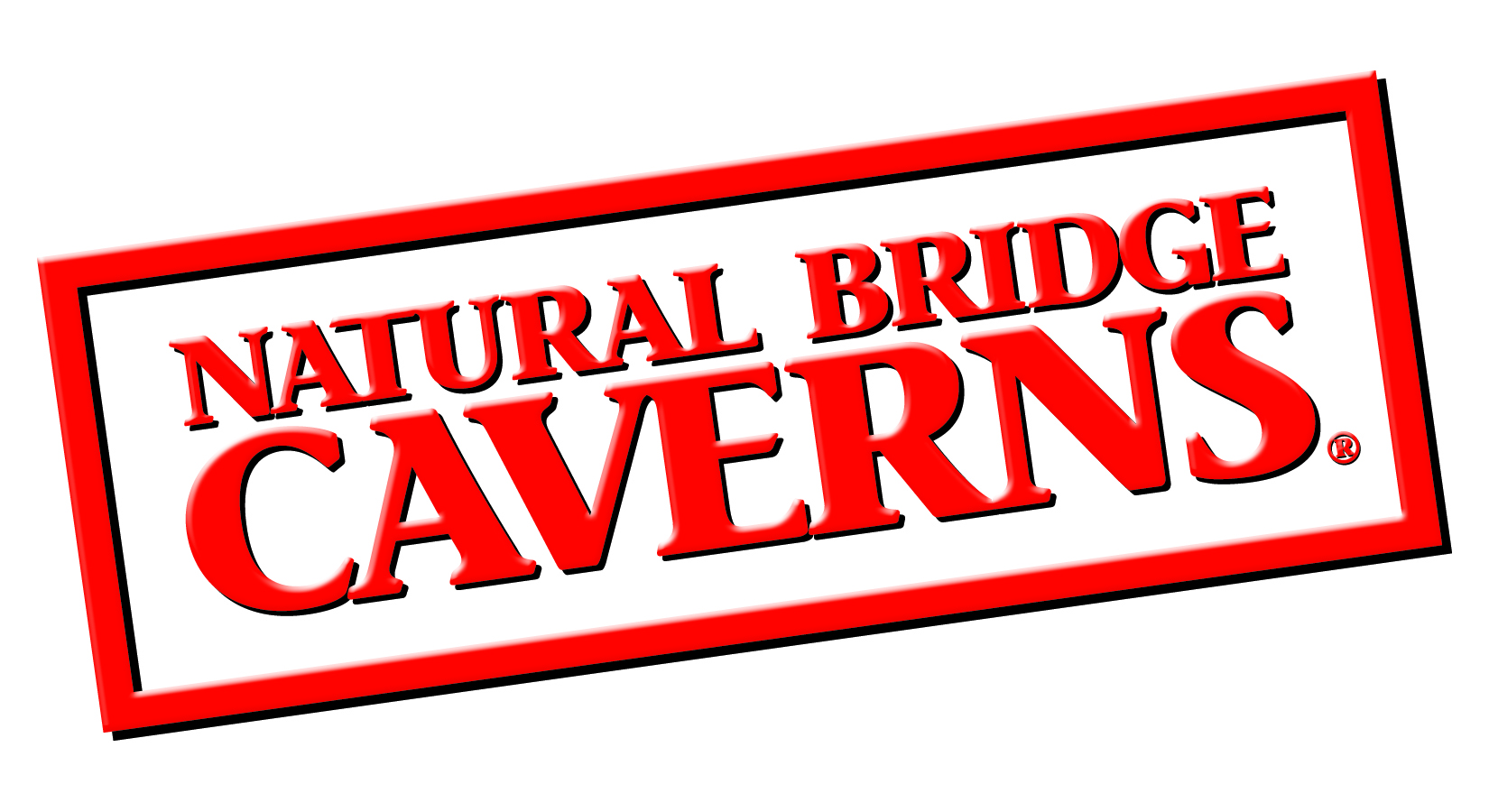

- Location within Texas Location within the United States
- Location: Comal County, Texas, United States
- Nearest city: San Antonio
- Coordinates: 29°41′31.16″N 98°20′34.26″W
- Established: July 3, 1964 (Discovered in March 1960)
- Website: https://naturalbridgecaverns.com

U.S. National Natural Landmark
- Designated: 1971

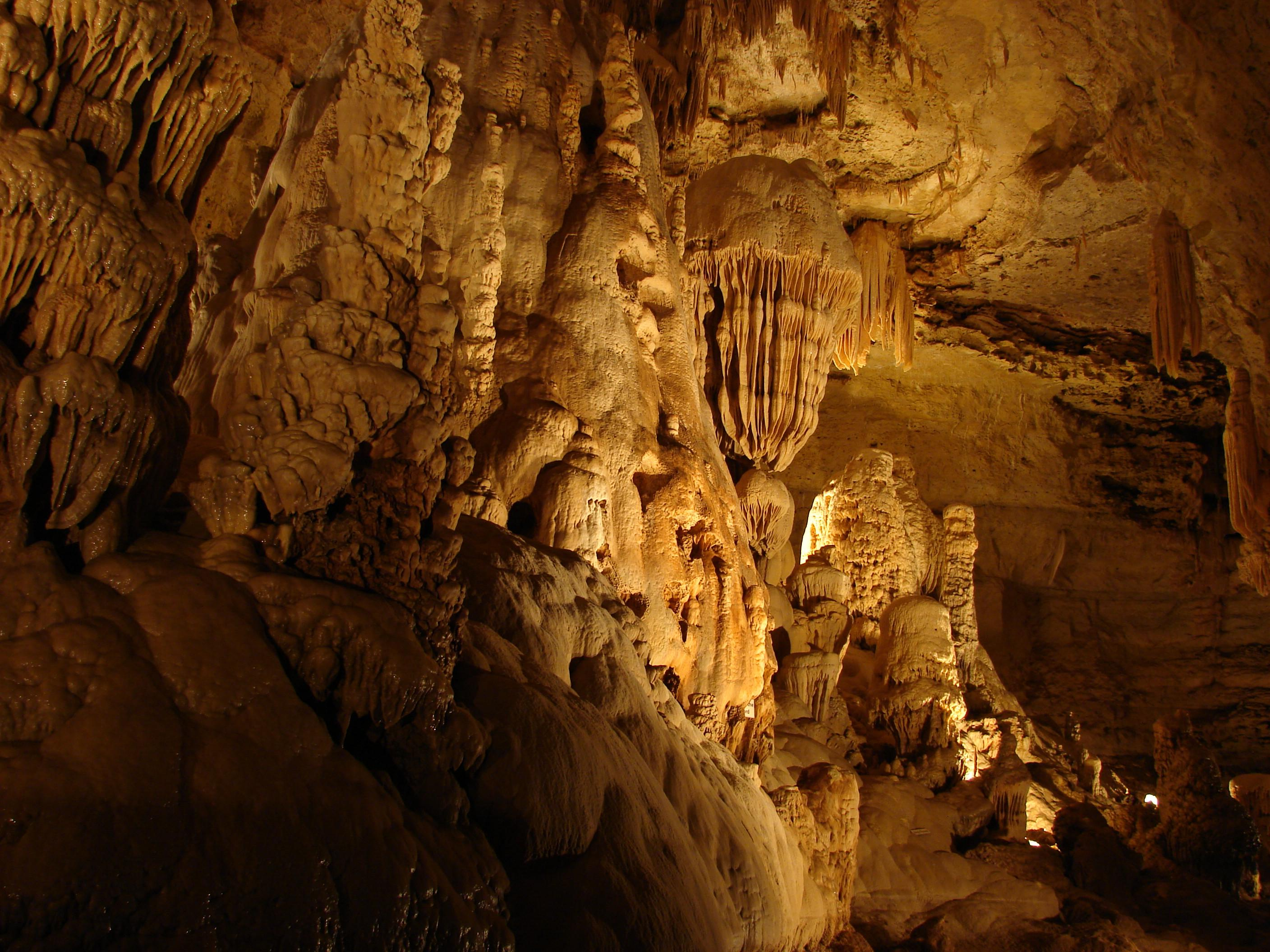
Natural Bridge Caverns

The Natural Bridge Caverns are the largest commercial caverns in the US state of Texas. The name is derived from the 60-foot (18 m) natural limestone slab bridge that spans the amphitheater setting of the cavern's entrance. The span was left suspended when a sinkhole collapsed below it.

The caverns are located near the city of San Antonio, Texas, in the Texas Hill Country next to the Natural Bridge Wildlife Ranch, a drive-through wildlife safari park. The caverns feature several unique speleothems and other geological formations, including magnificent stalactites that hang from the ceiling . The temperature inside the cave is 70 °F (21 °C) year-round and the humidity rate is a constant 99 percent. The deepest part of the public tour is 180 feet (55 m) below the surface, although undeveloped areas of the cavern reach depths of 230 feet (70 m).

The caverns are still slowly developing. Due to the porosity of the limestone, rainwater travels downward through the layers of rock, where it dissolves out calcite, a weak mineral that makes up all the speleothems at the Natural Bridge Caverns. After exiting the limestone, water enters the caverns where it flows and drips constantly throughout, causing the formations to retain a waxy luster that can be seen in a few caverns.

== History ==
The caverns were discovered on March 27, 1960, by students Orion Knox Jr., Preston Knodell Jr., Al Brandt, and Joe Cantu from St. Mary's University in nearby San Antonio. On their fourth trip into the caverns, the men discovered/explored just over a mile (1.6 km) of passage. Subsequent explorations revealed two miles (3.2 km) associated with what became known as the "North Cavern".

After discovery, Knox assisted the landowners in obtaining information and suggestions for development. Clara Wuest (the landowner) wanted to show the world the cave under her property. Knox approached both the National Park Service and the Texas Park System. While both entities agreed that the cavern was substantial and merited development, both groups told the landowners that funds did not exist for their respective groups to undergo such an endeavor.

Wuest then decided that she would fund development. Knox dropped out of school to assist. He also approached Jack Burch, who had just finished work on developing the Caverns of Sonora near Sonora, Texas. Burch agreed to help and development began early in 1963. Wuest remarried Harry Heidemann, a retired Texas Highway Patrolman, in the early 1960s. Together, they started work on developing the cavern. The full-time development crew included Wuest (now Wuest-Heidemann), Heidemann, Burch, Knox, and Reggie Wuest (Wuest-Heidemann's son). Development on the cavern began in 1963 and work on lights and trails continued until opening day, July 3, 1964. The cavern has been opened ever since and is still owned and operated by family members. The Natural Bridge Caverns became a registered US National Natural Landmark in 1971.

During excavation of the entrance trail, a human tooth, arrowheads, and spearheads dating from 5000 BCE were found. Also, just inside the entrance, a jawbone and femur from an extinct species of black bear were discovered. This leads many to believe that the uppermost areas of the cavern were used as a shelter by early peoples and animals at some point. An archeological dig was recently done under the natural bridge. Archeologists recovered arrowheads and other tools which further indicate the presence of early peoples at some point in history.

== Further exploration ==
In 1967, speculation on a southern extent to the North Cavern was confirmed when test drilling indicated the presence of a large void approximately 90 feet (27 m) beneath the surface. A camera was sent down the narrow shaft and photographs revealed a large chamber filled with formations. This original shaft was reamed out to 22 inches (56 cm) and three men were lowered into the ground. They discovered a large breakdown chamber and numerous formations. The first three men to enter this room were Jack Burch, Reggie Wuest, and Myles Kuykendall. By combining the first two letters of each man's first name, they arrived at JAREMY, and thus this newly discovered room was called the Jaremy Room.

Further investigation near the bottom of the Jaremy Room revealed a strong likelihood that another passage existed beyond a pile of rocks and boulders. In 1968, the drillers were once again brought out to the property and another exploratory shaft was sunk into the ground. This shaft also penetrated a large void approximately 150 feet (46 m) below ground. As before, the initial shaft was enlarged and people dropped down into the unknown. Explorations revealed another half-mile (0.80 km) of cavern extending to the south. This then became known as the South Cavern.

== Recent exploration ==
Exploration continues to date. During mid-2005, several hundred feet were added to the current surveyed length of the cave. It is believed that as much as another mile (1.6 km) could be added to the survey by just mapping the known passages which have not yet been surveyed. Additional unexplored leads exist in sections of the Discovery Passages (North Cavern).

Since May 8, 2019, a team of cave explorers have discovered over 1,600 feet (490 m) of new never before seen passages. As explorers move deeper into the cavern, each expedition takes longer, with the latest taking more than 19 hours to complete.

== Passages renamed ==
In 2008, the caverns' owners changed the names for the passages. The "North Cavern" was changed to "Discovery Passages". and the "South Cavern" was changed to "Hidden Passages". According to the landowners, the change in names better reflects the discovery and exploration history of the cavern and removes some confusion for guests.

== Wildlife ==
There is recent evidence of bats residing in the Natural Bridge Caverns including roosting areas and accumulation of bat guano. Bracken Cave, near the Natural Bridge Caverns, is home to one of two large bat colonies in Texas. The bats that inhabit Bracken Cave are a small species called Mexican free-tailed bats. Bats control the insect population, help to pollinate plants, and are a food source for other animals, making them a valuable part of the ecosystem. The cave was the focus of a 2013 episode of the syndicated anthology television series Texas Country Reporter, hosted by Bob Phillips.

== Natural Bridge Caverns Sinkhole ==
- Natural Bridge Caverns Sinkhole Site
- U.S. National Register of Historic Places
- Location: Address restricted, Natural Bridge Caverns, Texas
- Area: <1 acre (0.40 ha)
- NRHP reference No.: 04001202
- Added to NRHP: October 29, 2004

Located on the property is the Natural Bridge Caverns Sinkhole Site, an archeological site listed on the National Register of Historic Places. The location of the site is not publicly disclosed in order to preserve artifacts in their context for ongoing research.

== Gallery ==
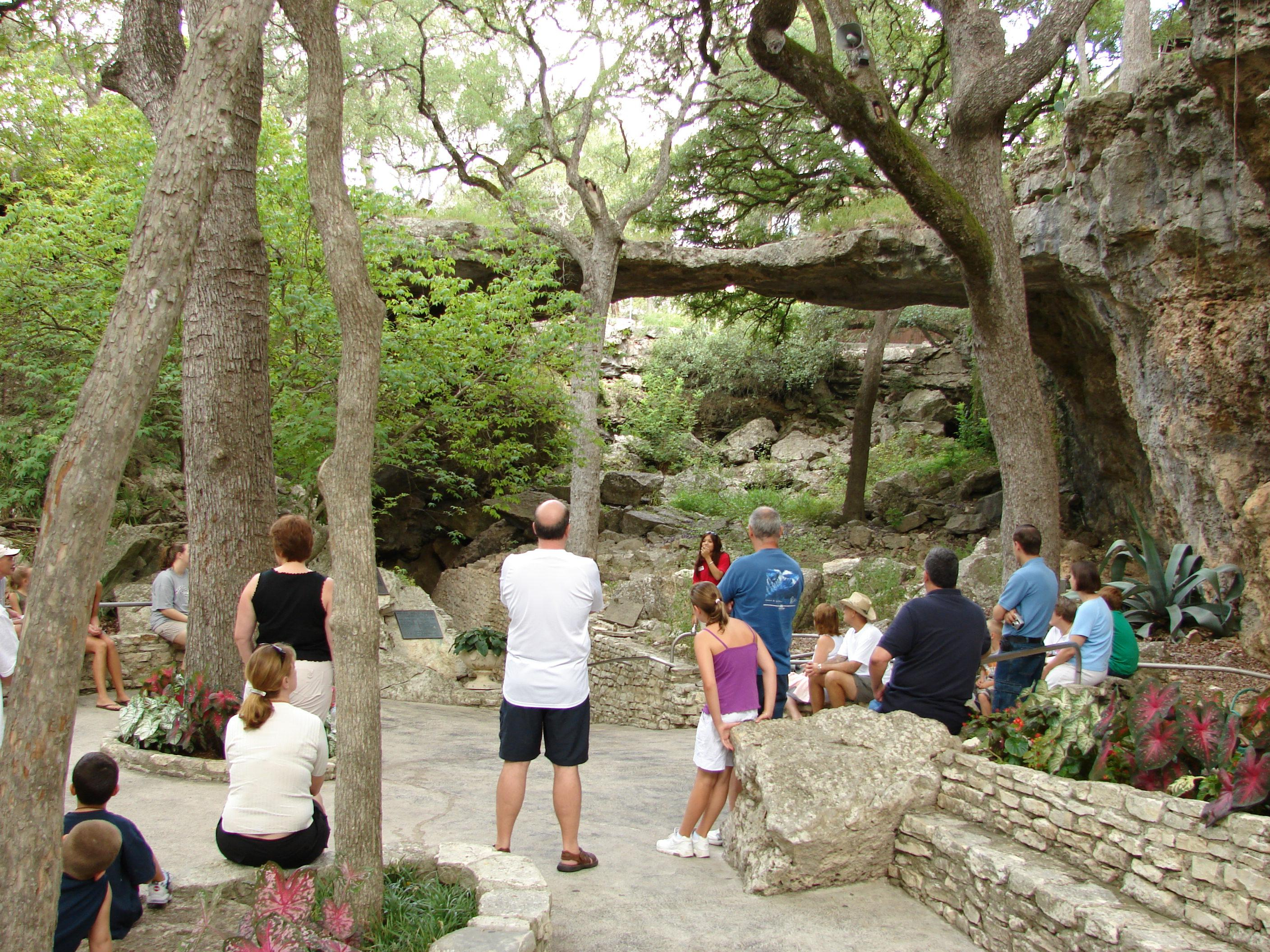
The natural bridge outside the cave entrance

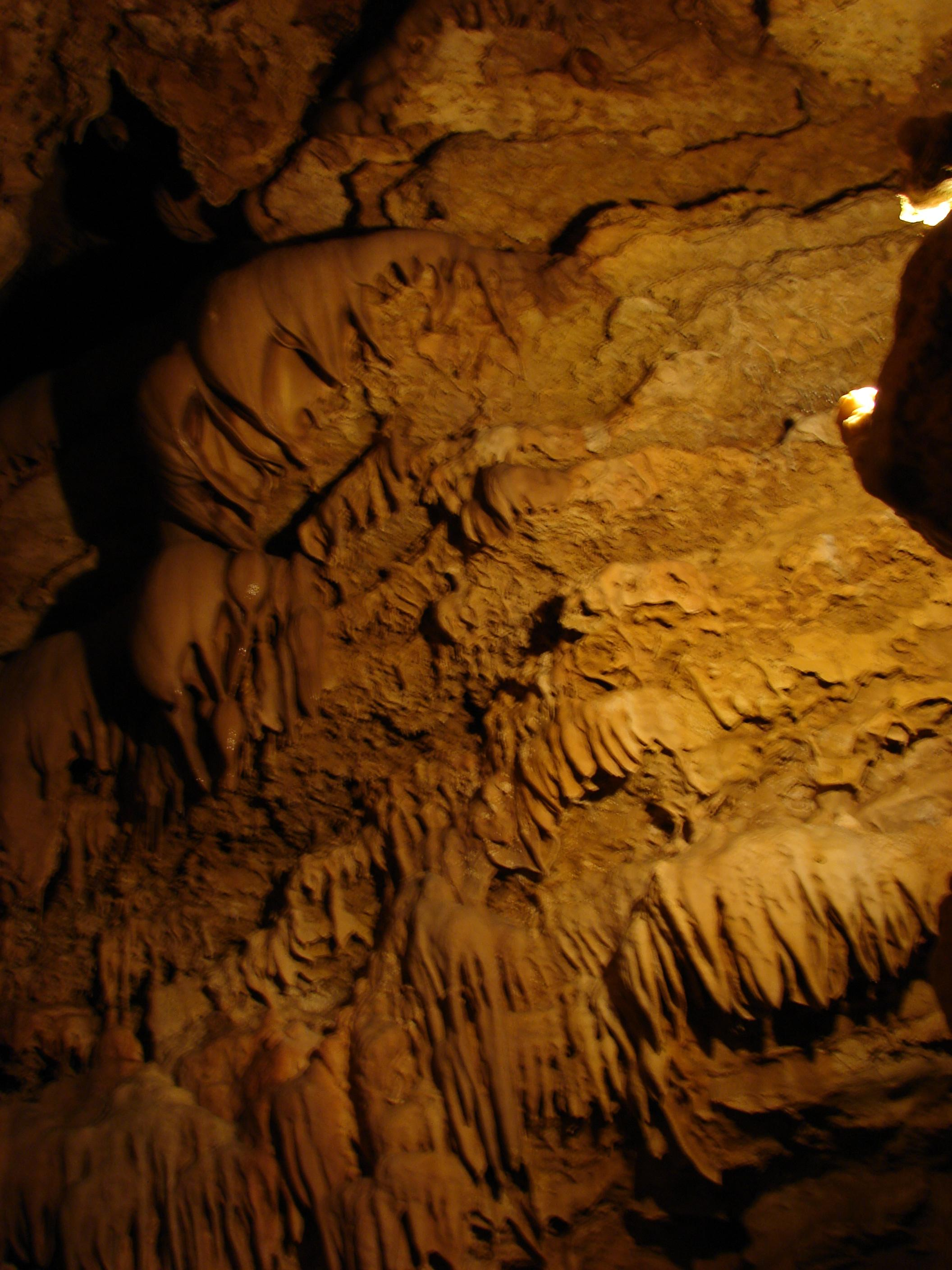
Flowstone is a dominant feature of the caverns.

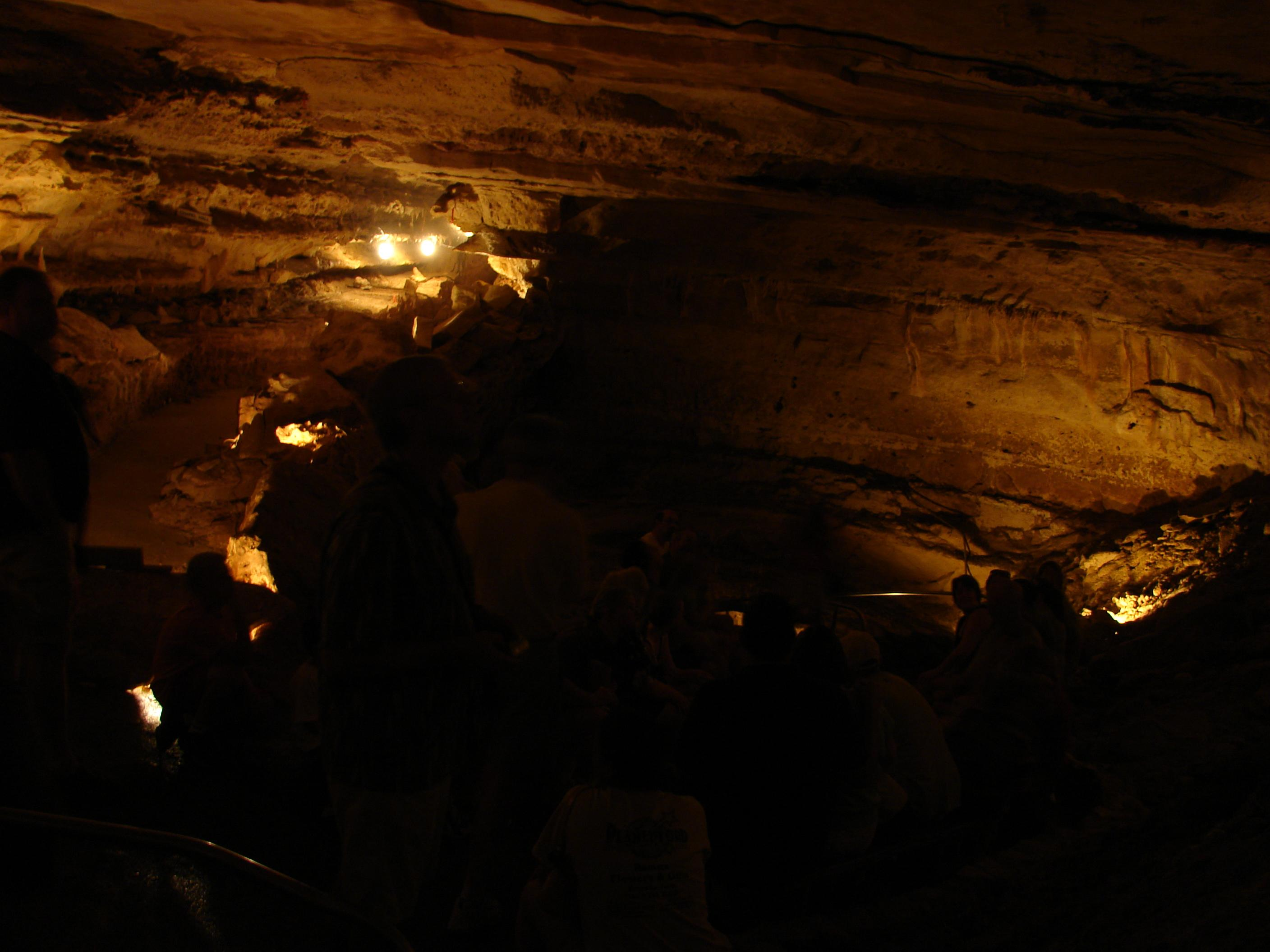
The cave contains large, switchback descents, and ascents.

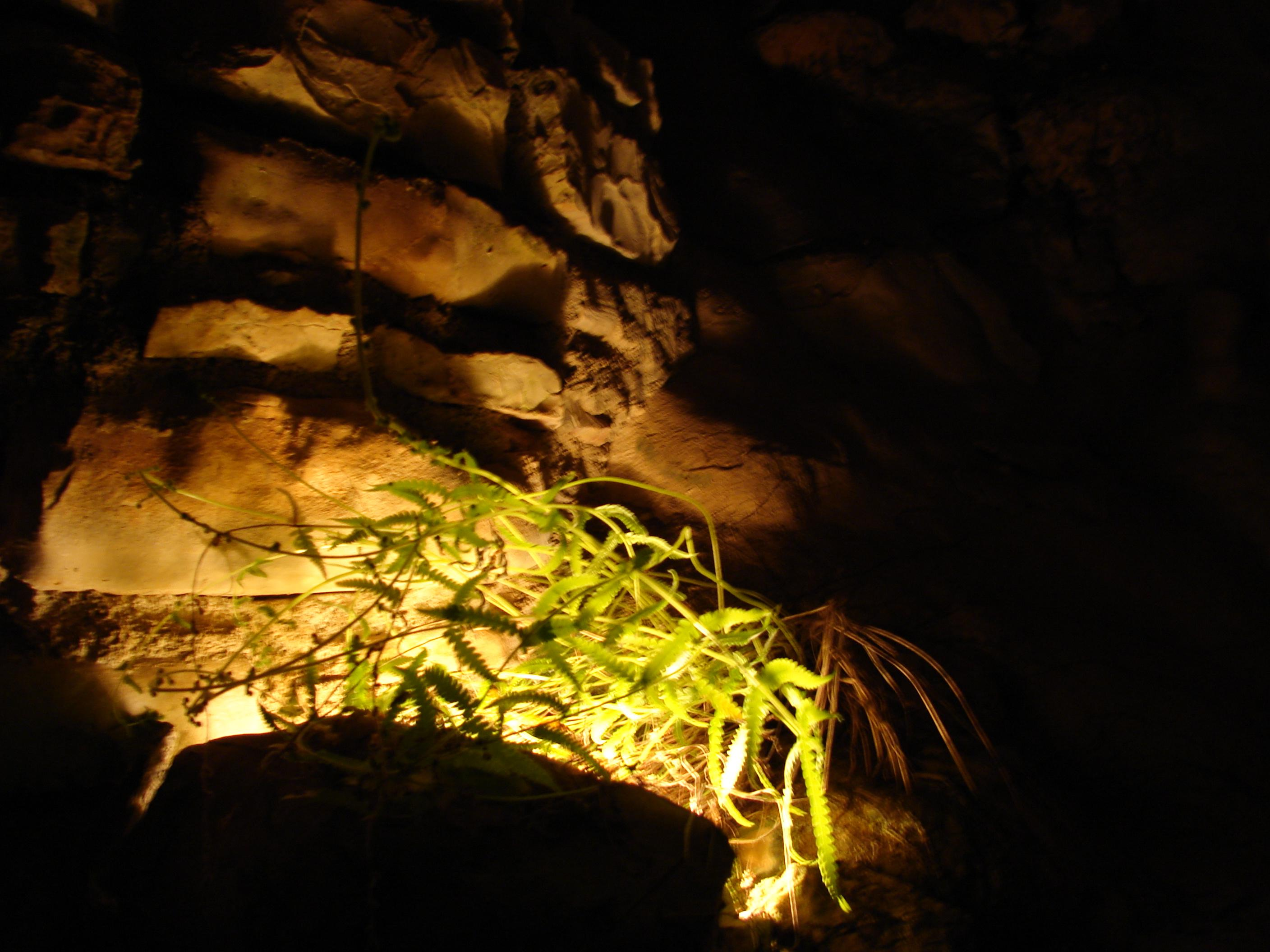
The only living plant in the cave—a small fern. The spores were believed to have been tracked in on a workers clothing, then germinated next to a light. The fern has since been removed.

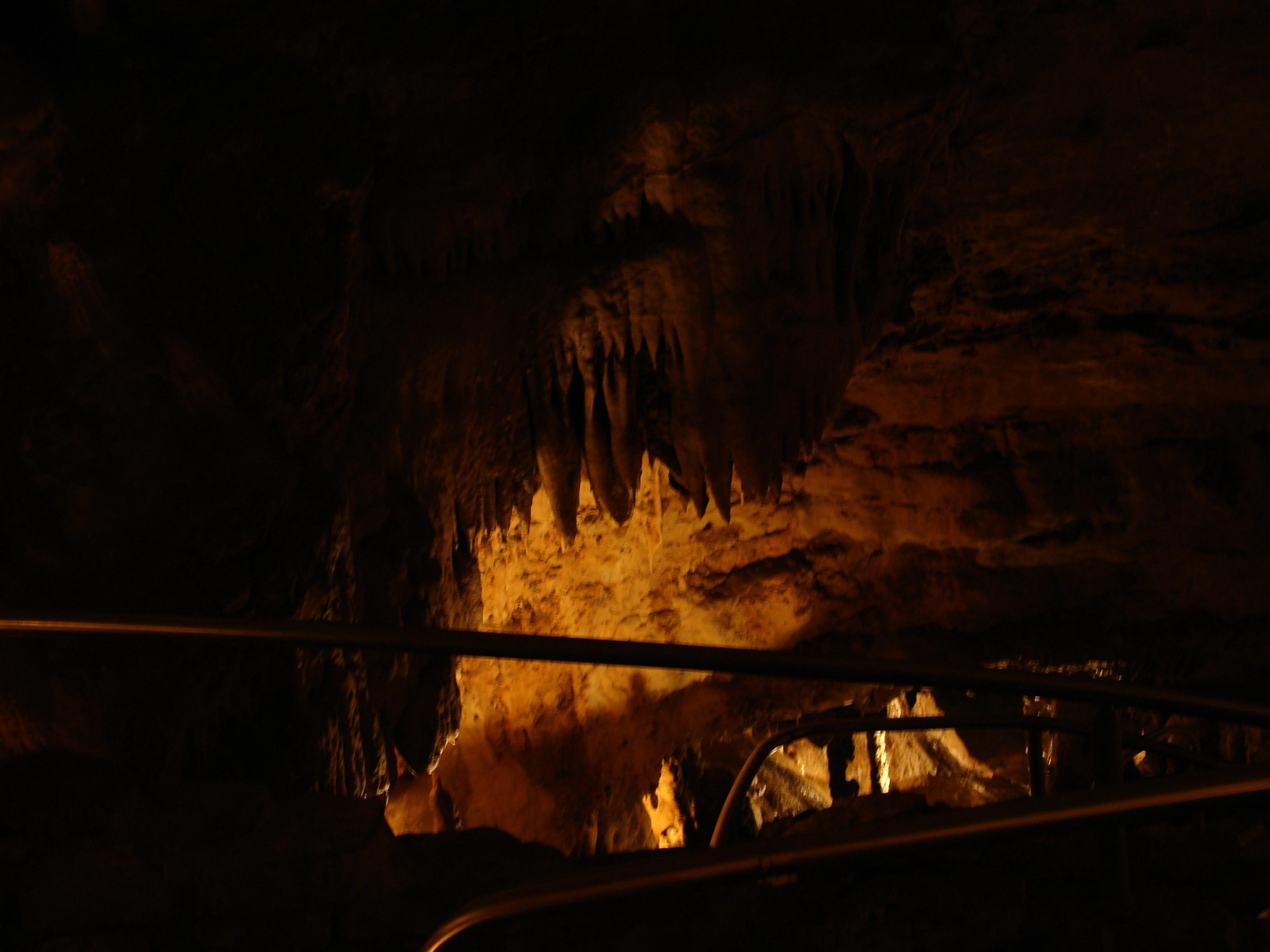
Flowstone ceiling over a switchback

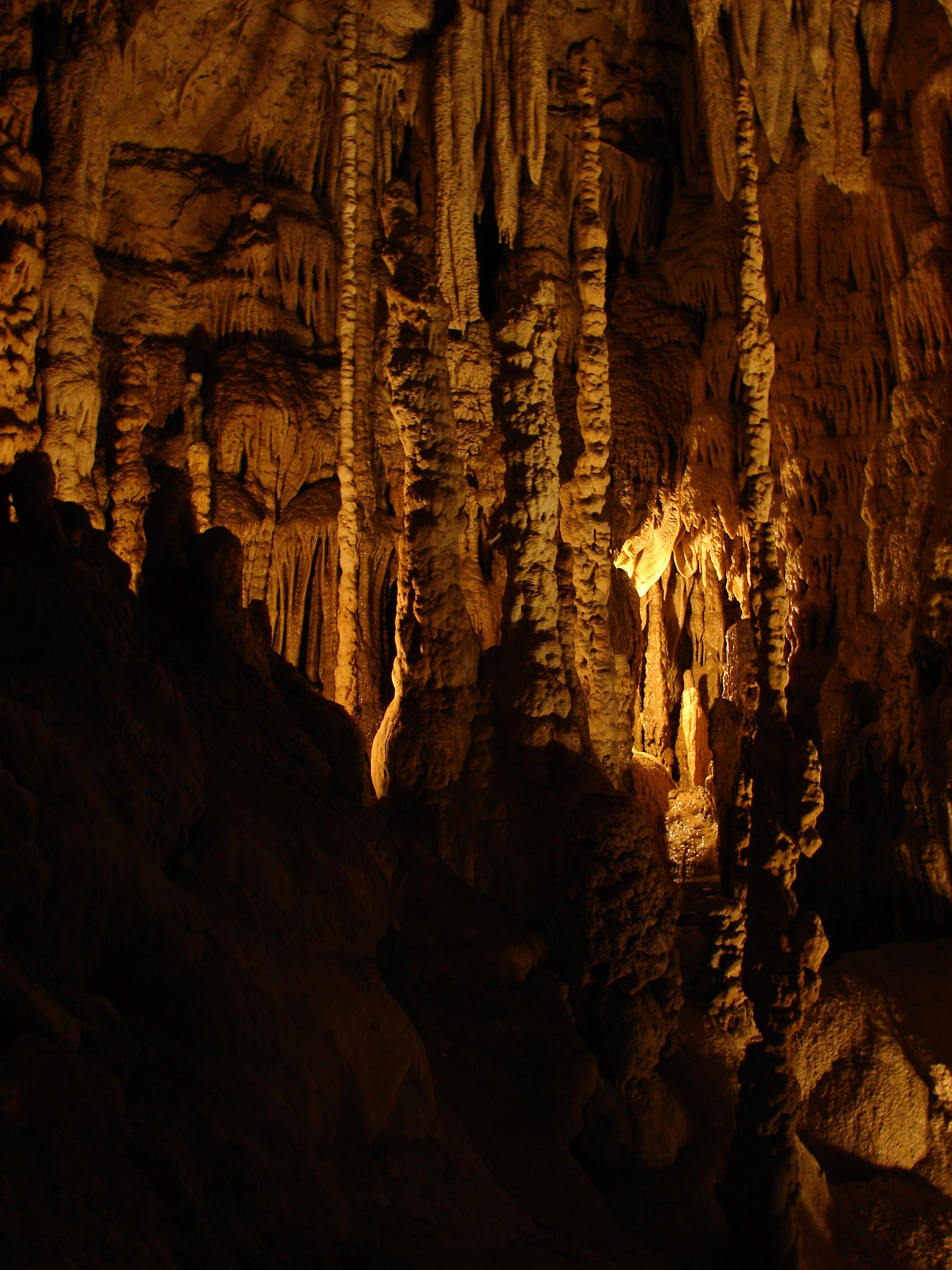
Tall, thin stalagmites and columns

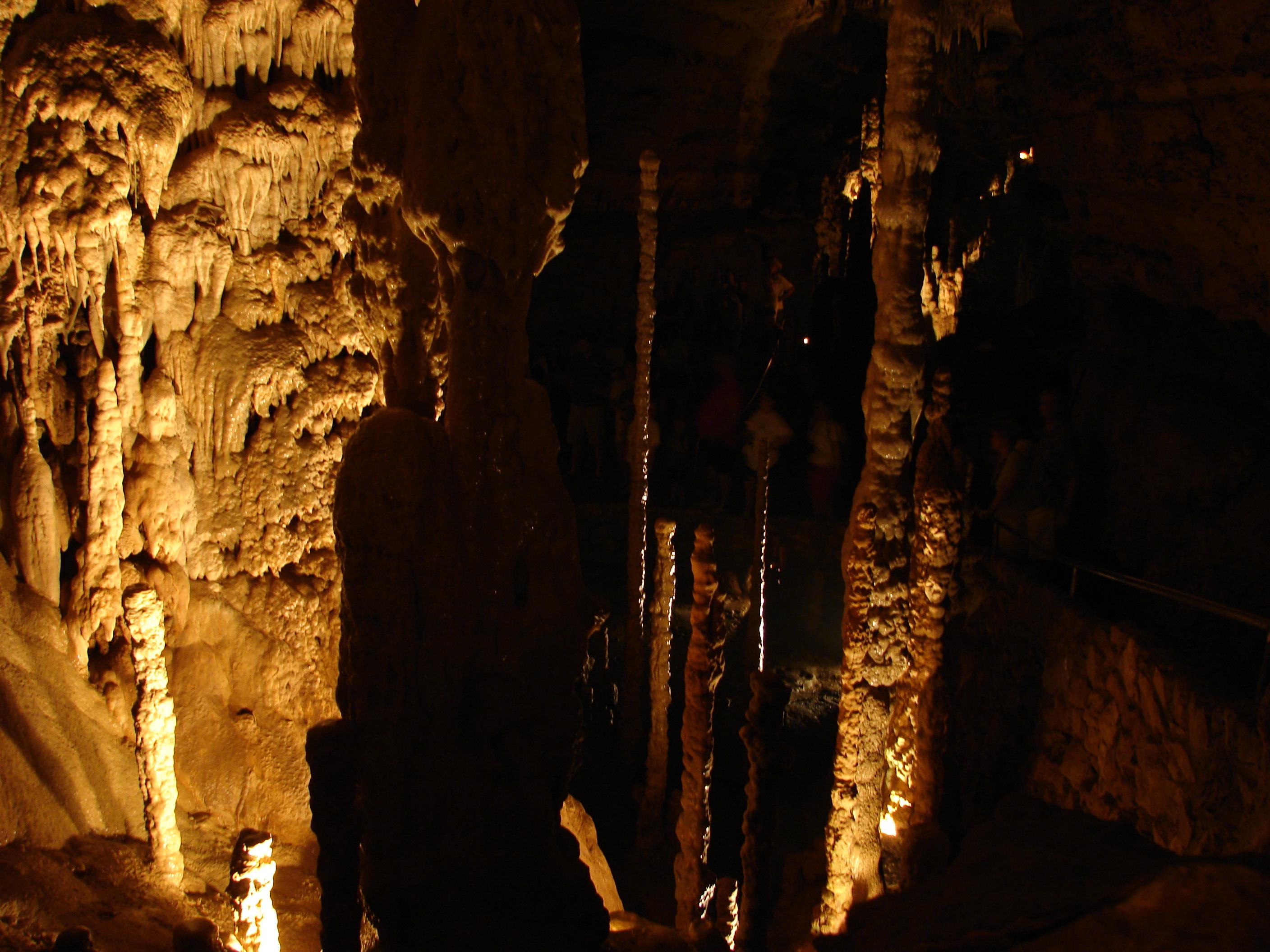
More tall, thin stalagmites

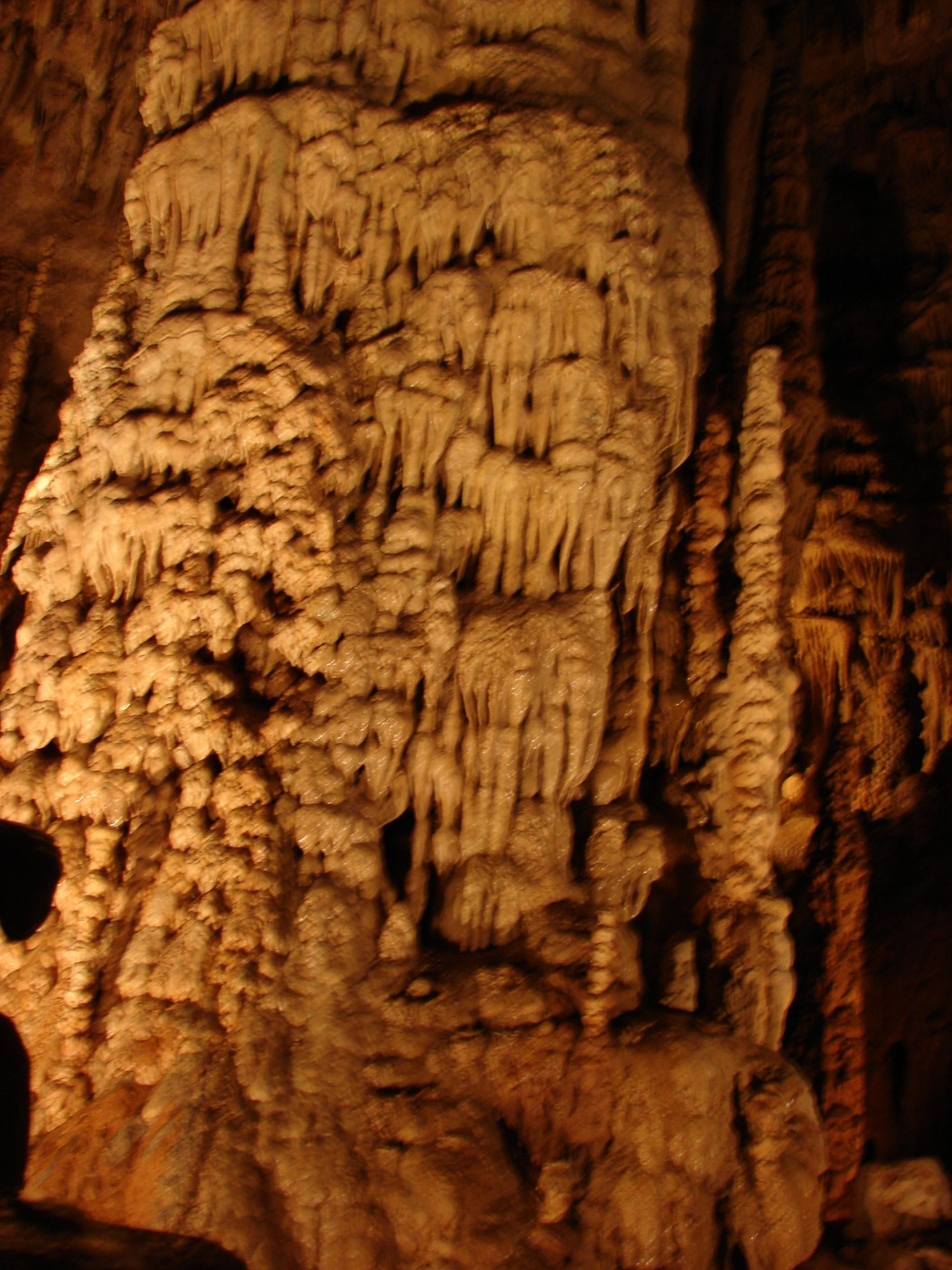
A large column

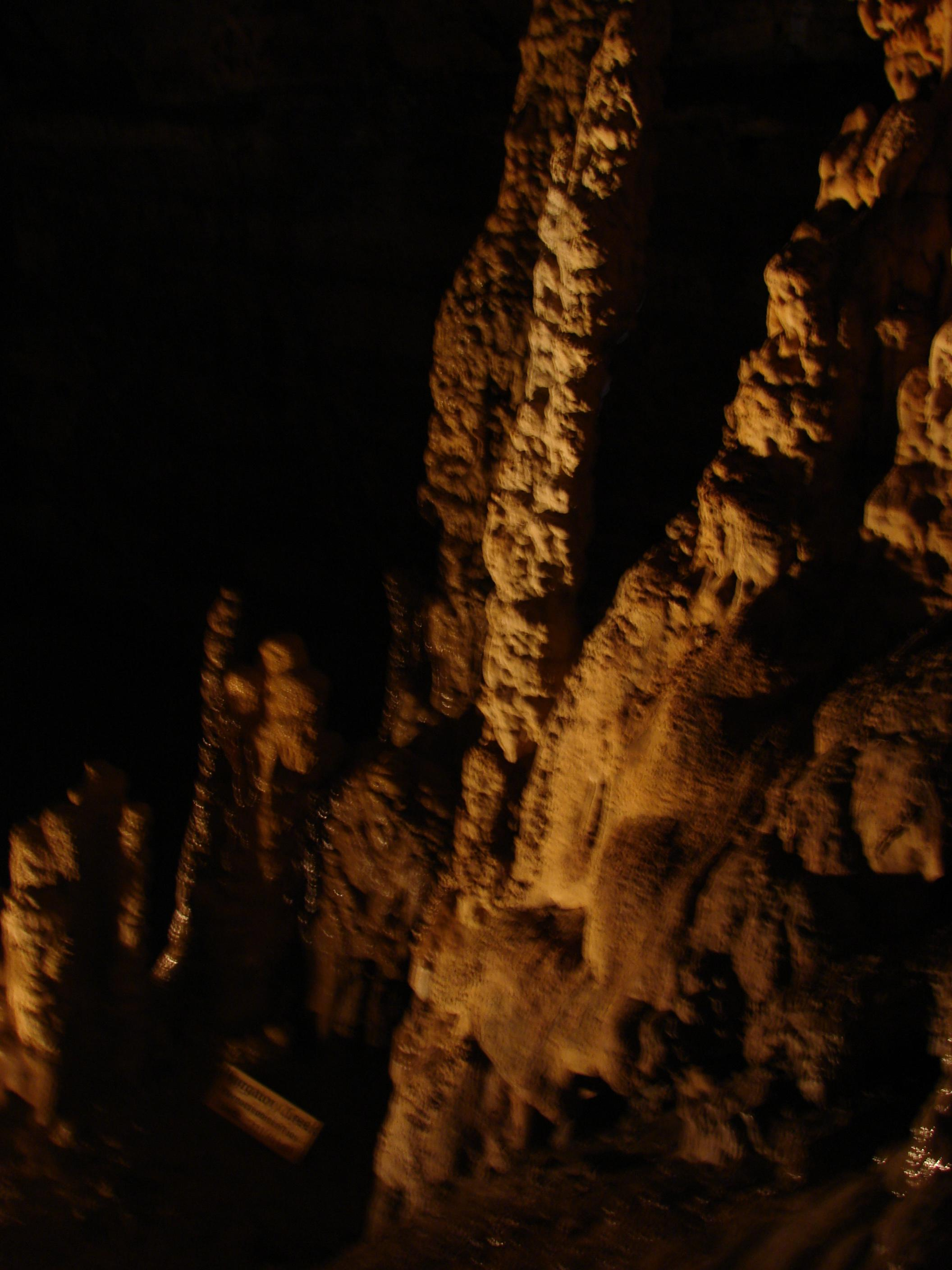

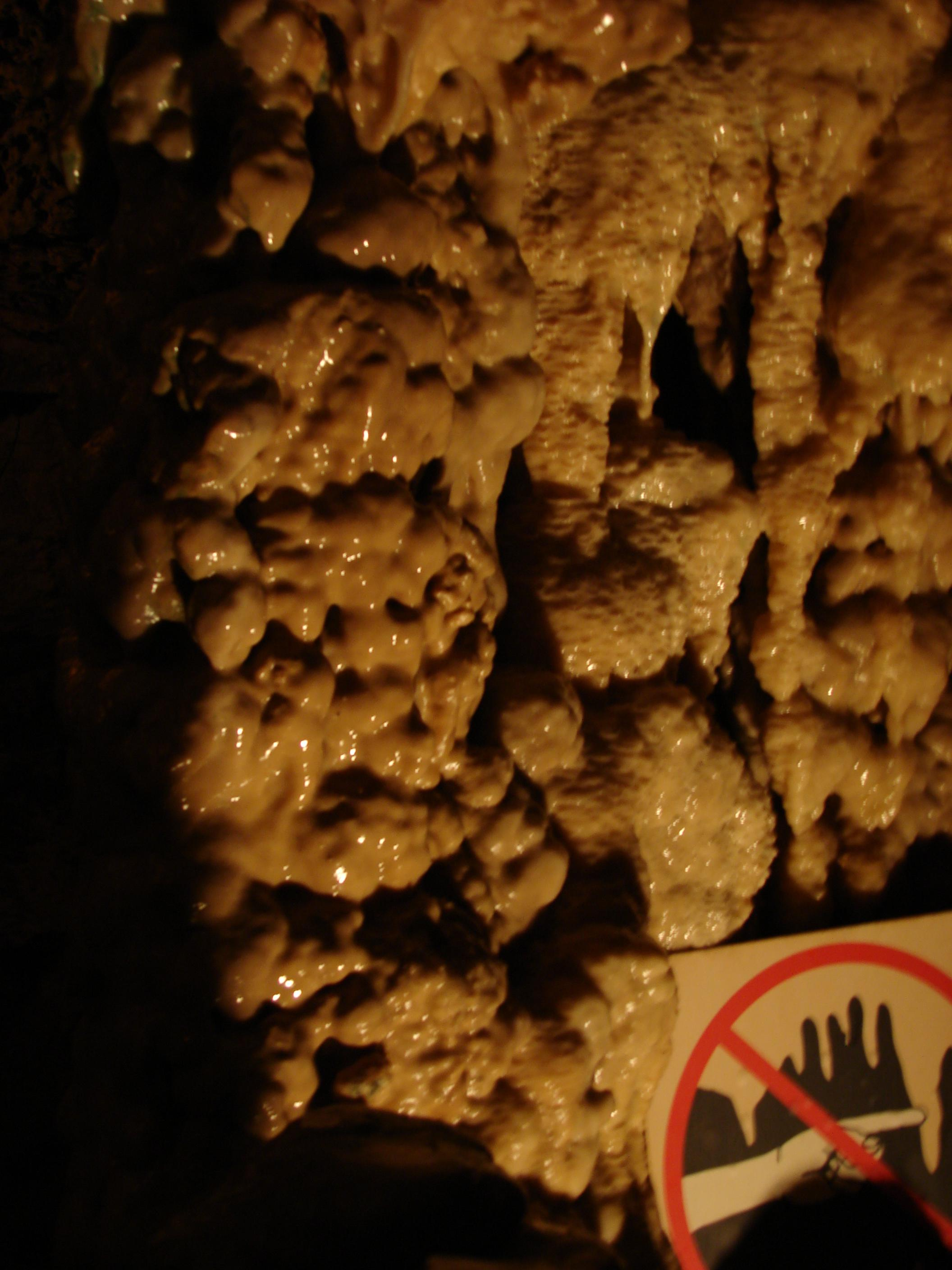
Closeup of flowstone

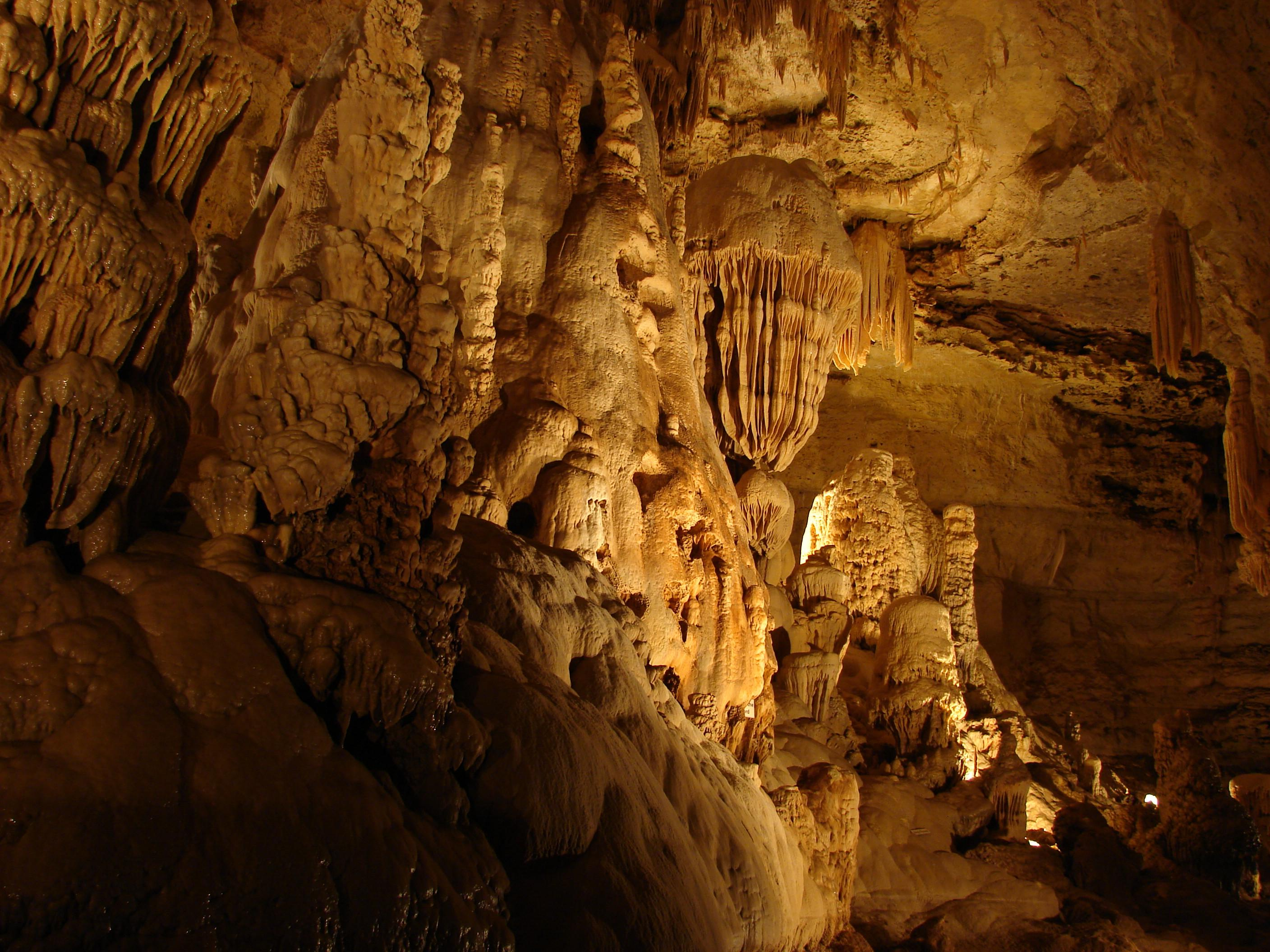
A large room full of speleothems

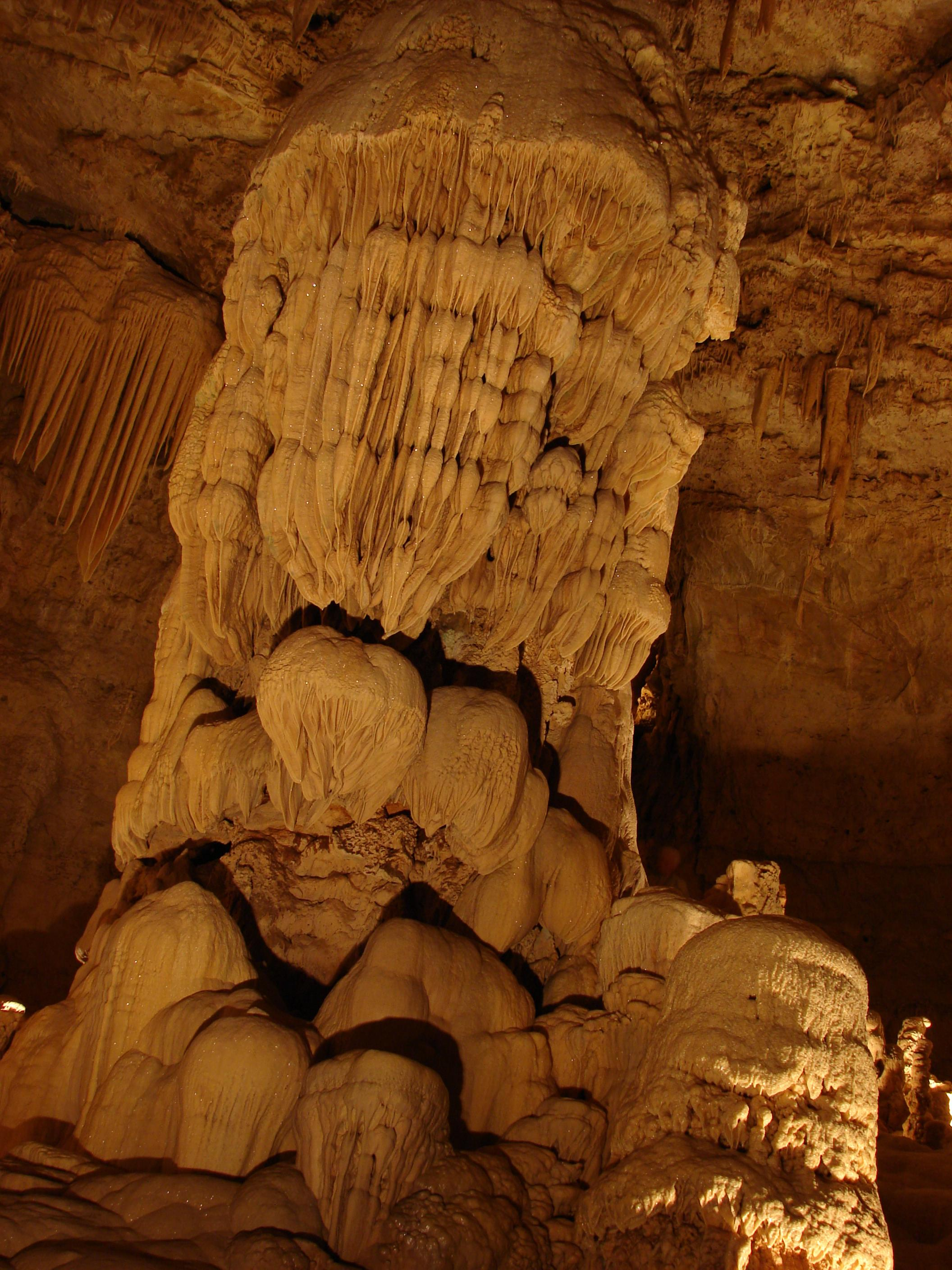
The King's Throne—a large stalagmite

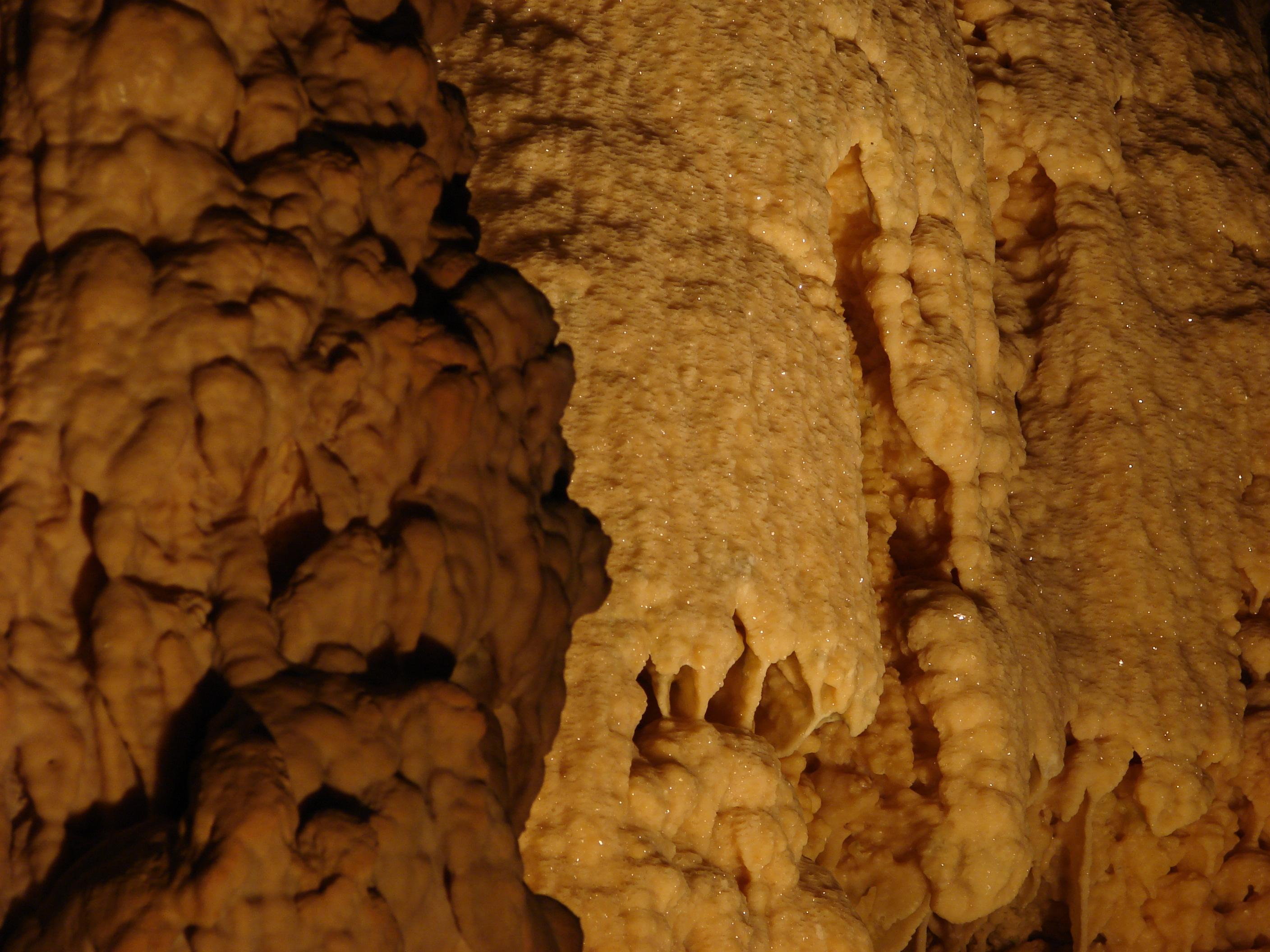
Water on calcite shimmers in the cave's lighting

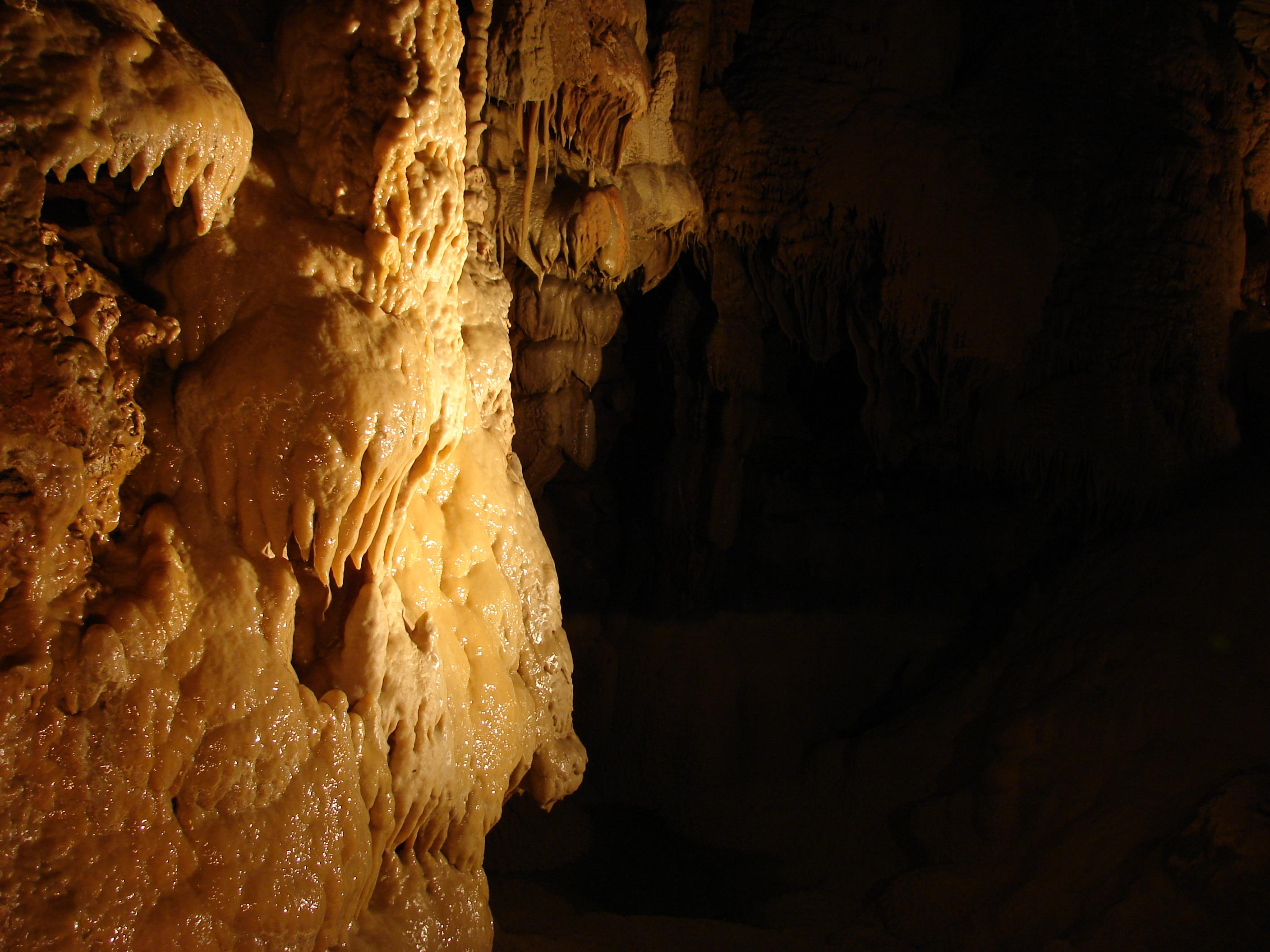

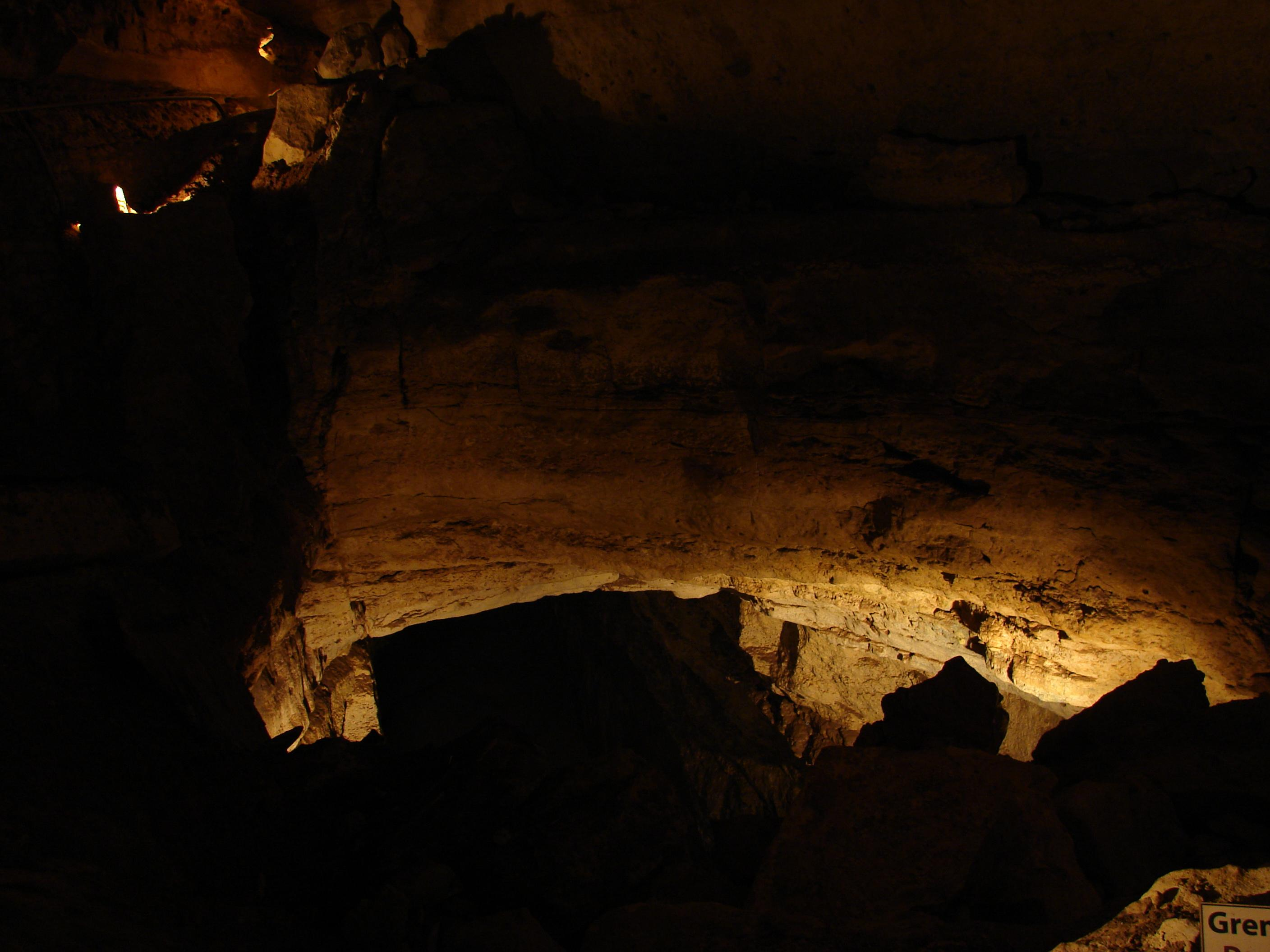
"Grendel's Canyon"

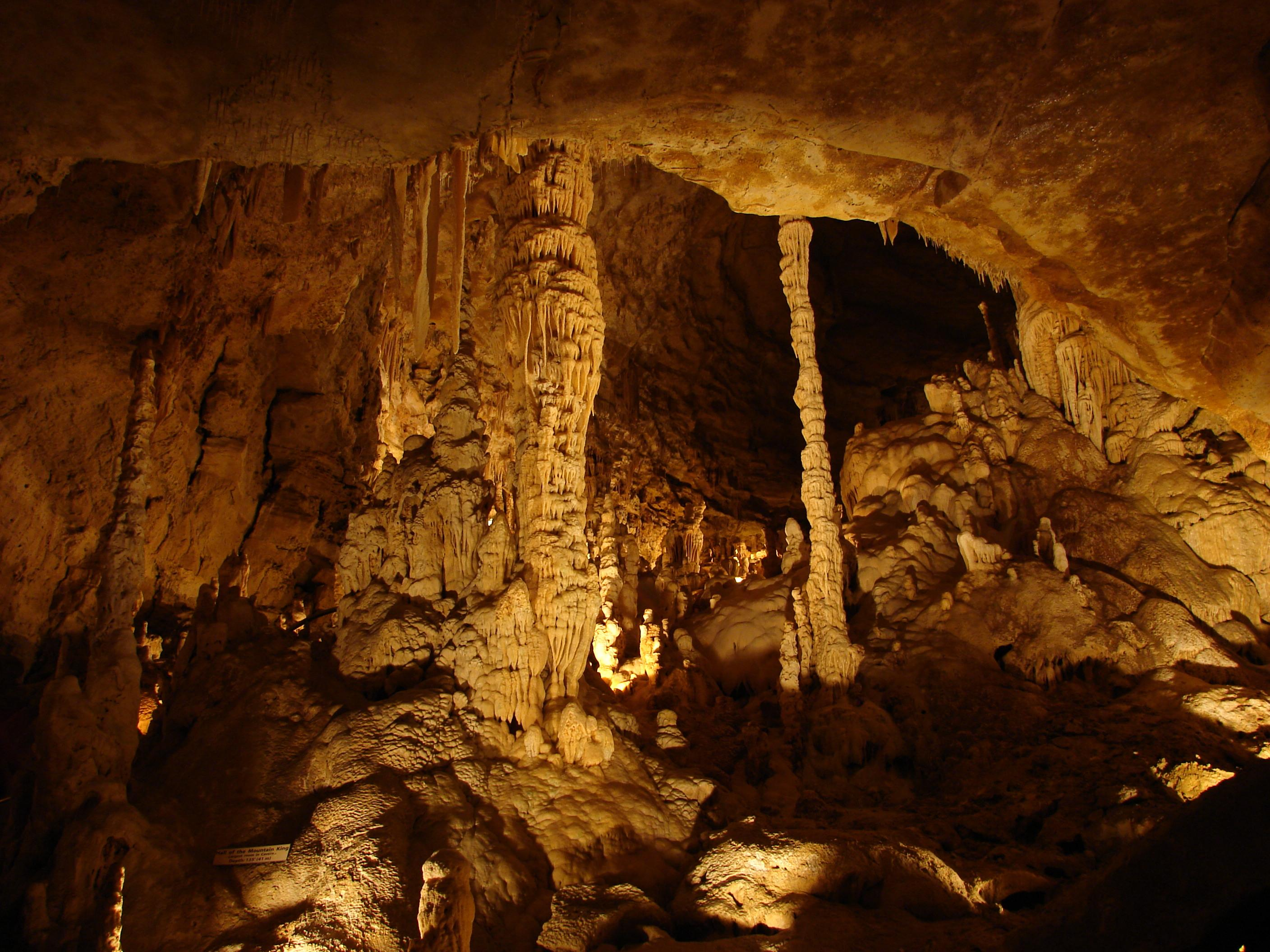
The ascent out of the cavern contains more massive rooms.

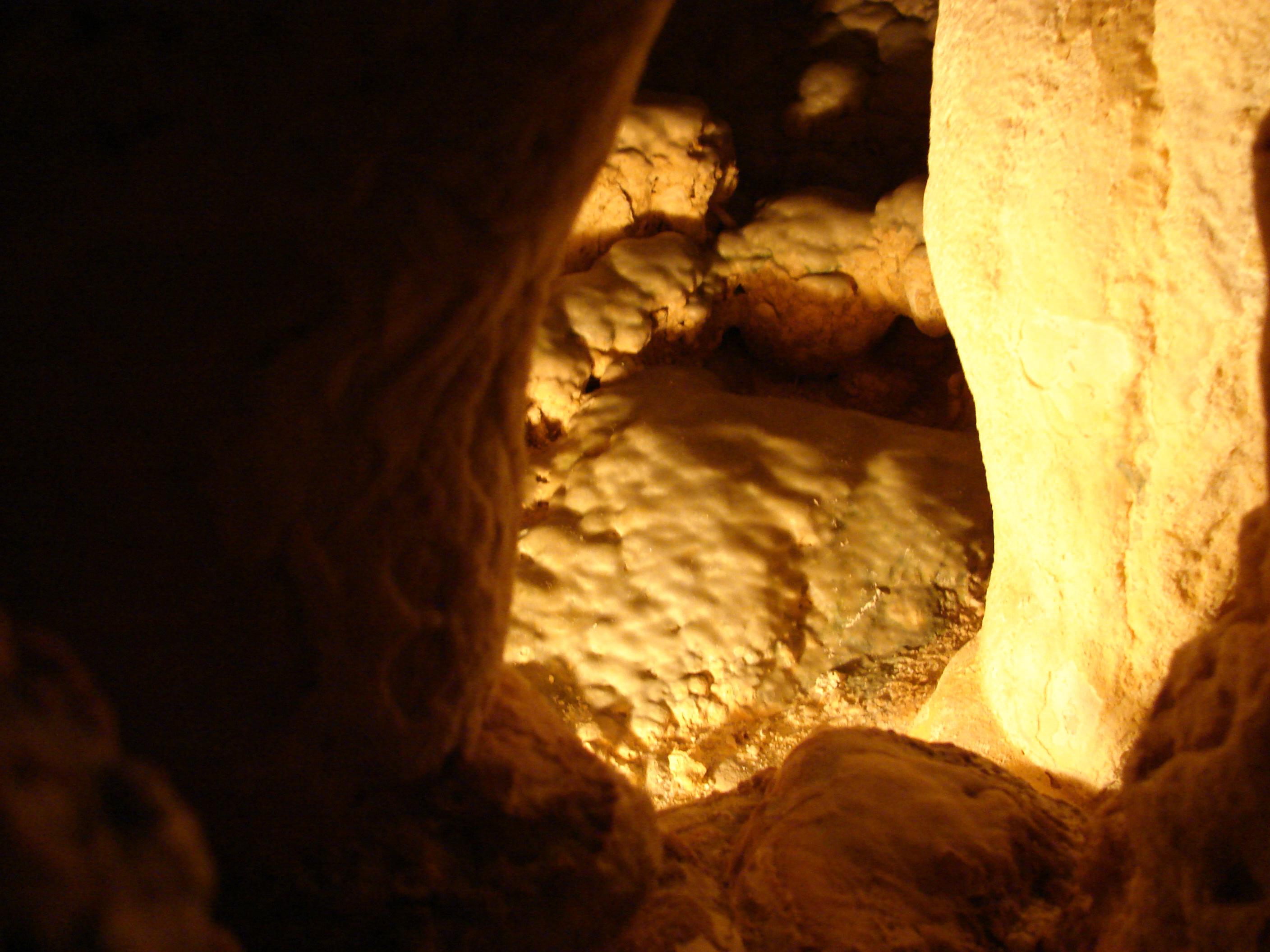

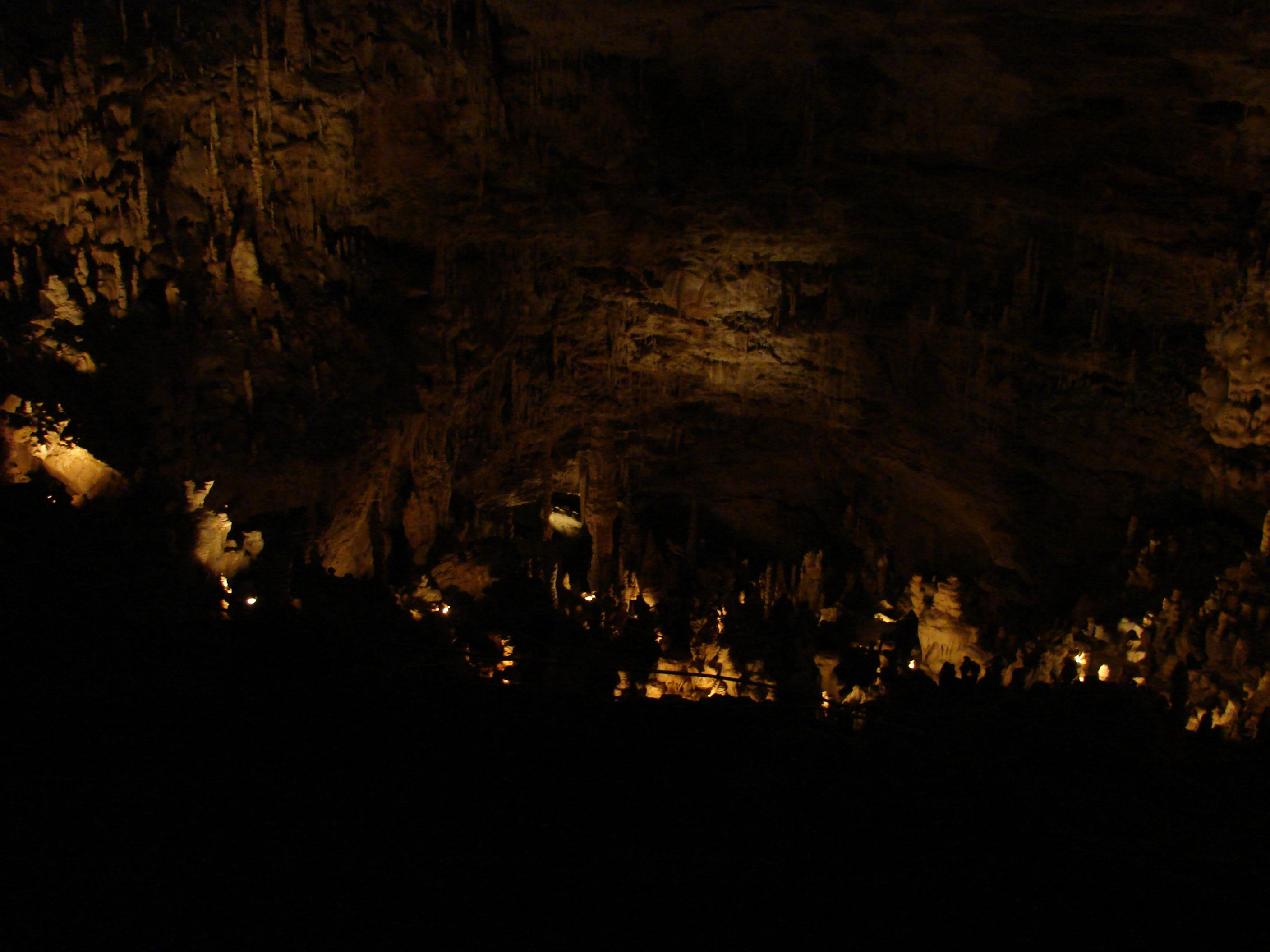
The view back into the cavern from near the exit

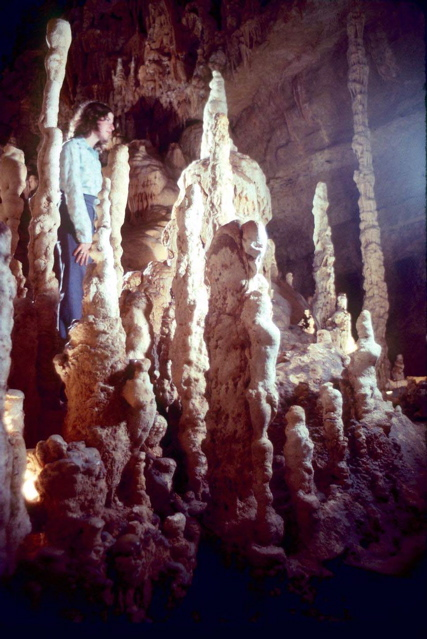
Formations

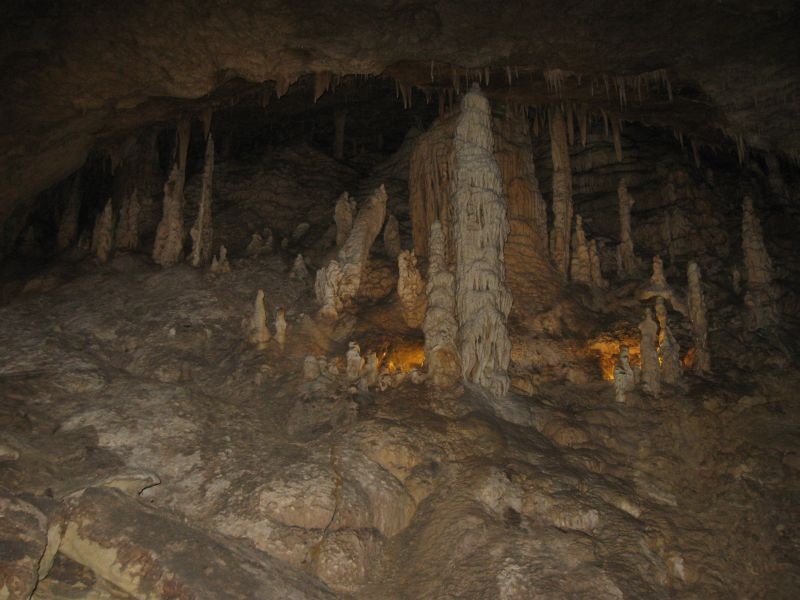
Pluto's Anteroom

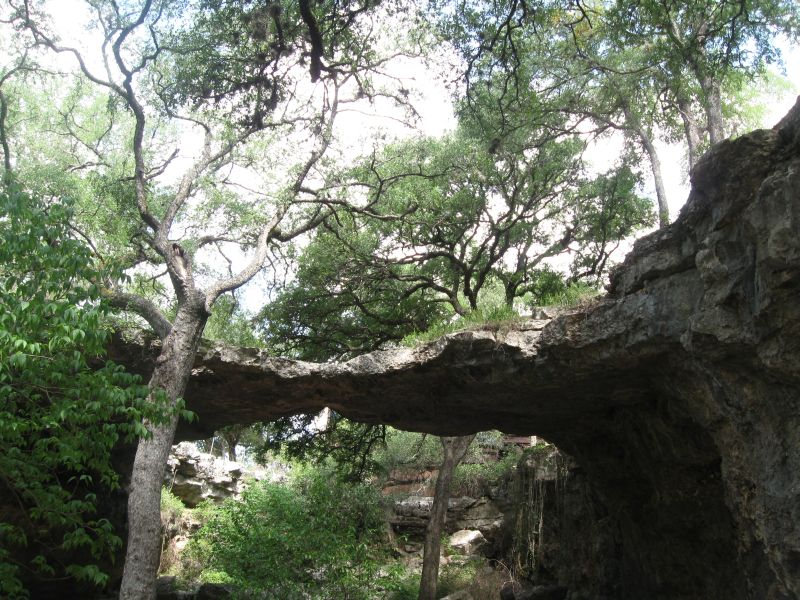
Cave entrance

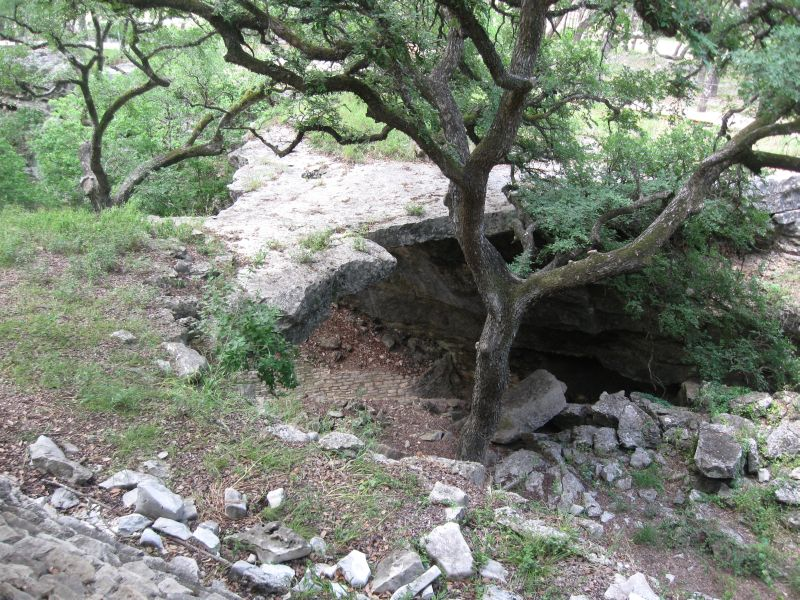
Cave entrance

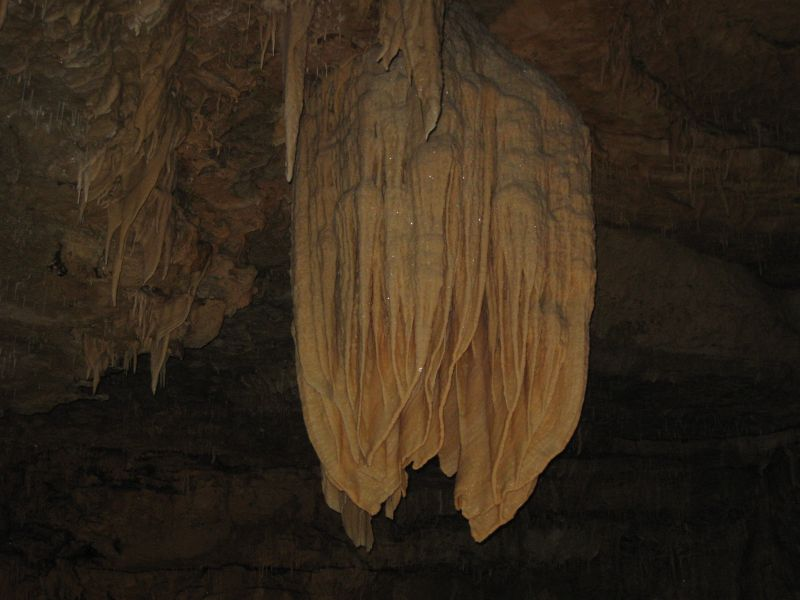
The Chandelier—In the Castle of the White Giants

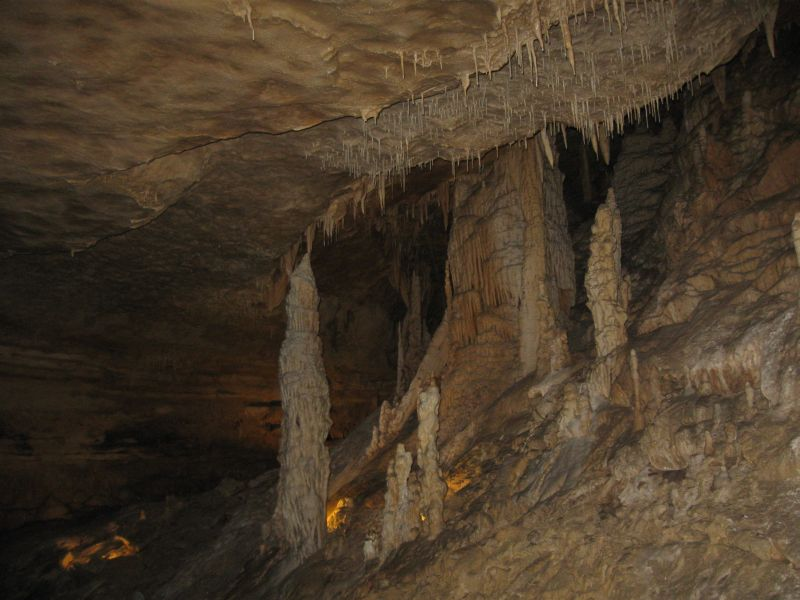
Pluto's Anteroom

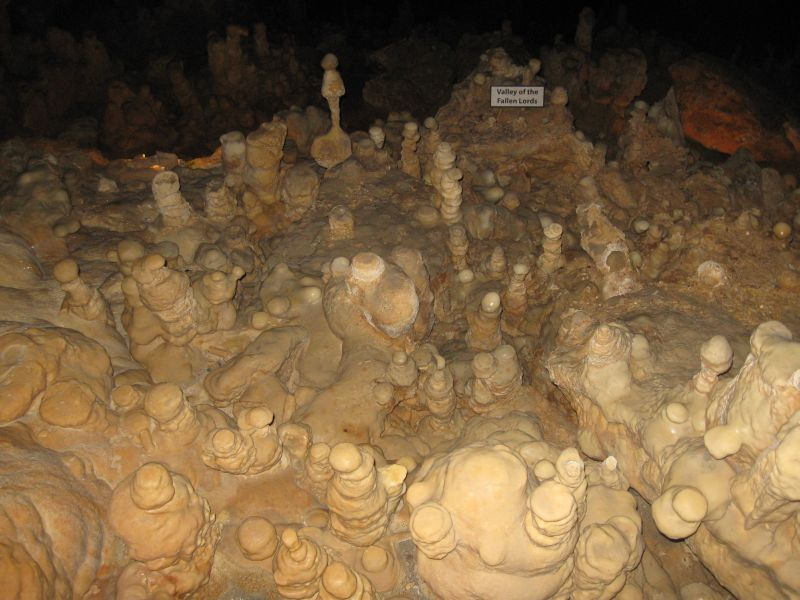
Valley of the Fallen Lords

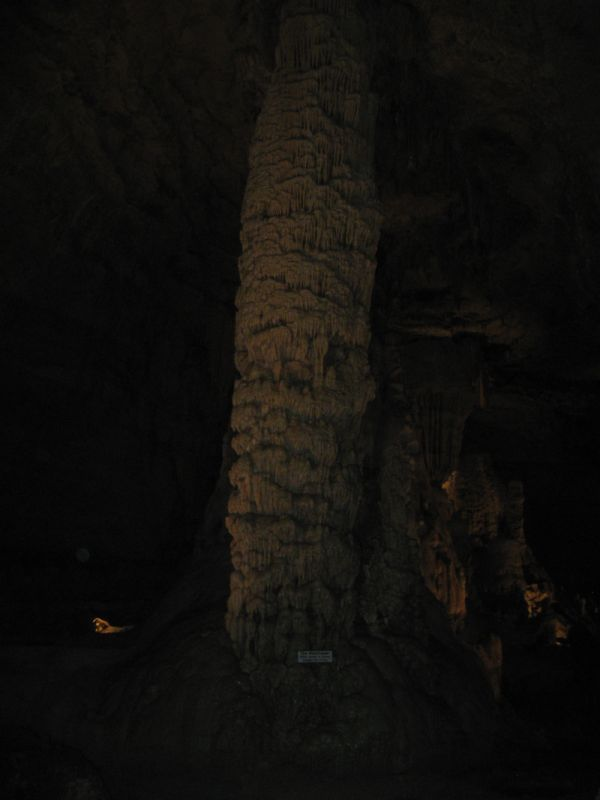
The Watchtower

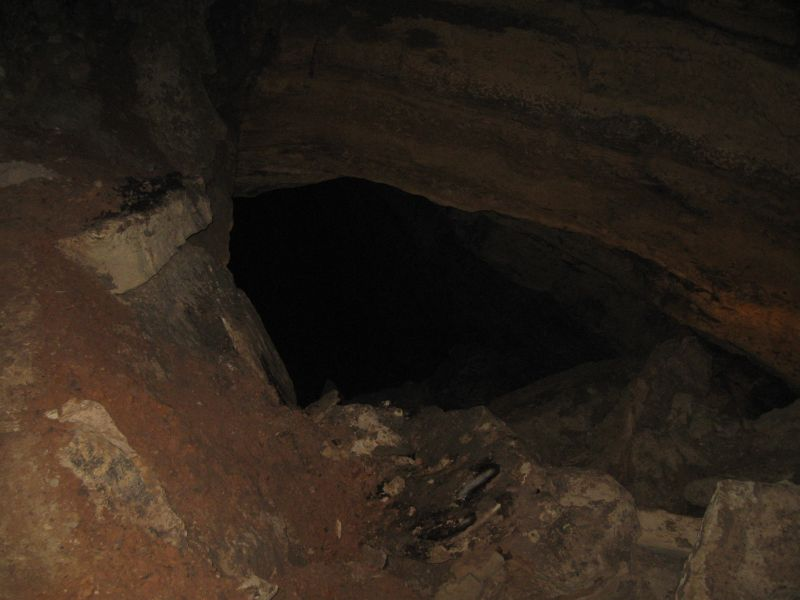
Grendel's Canyon

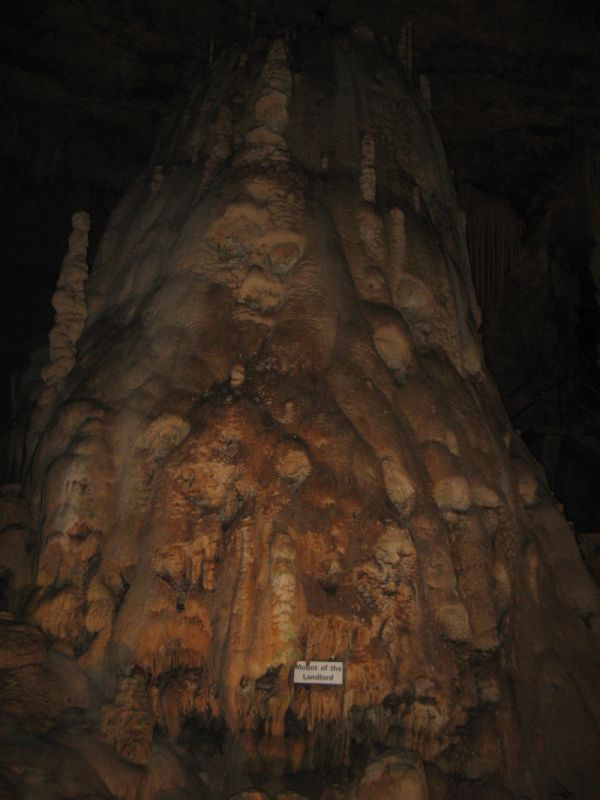
Mount of the Landlord—In the Castle of the White Giants

== See also ==
- National Register of Historic Places listings in Comal County, Texas
- List of National Natural Landmarks in Texas
