= Farm to Market Road 1957 =

Road in Texas

Farm to Market Road 1957
- FM 1957 highlighted in red

Route information
- Maintained by TxDOT
- Length: 15.983 mi (25.722 km)
- Existed: 1954–present

Major junctions
- West end: FM 471 near Rio Medina
- SH 211; Loop 1604 in San Antonio; SH 151 in San Antonio
- East end: Culebra Road (former FM 3487) in San Antonio

Location
- Country: United States
- State: Texas
- Counties: Medina, Bexar

Highway system
- Highways in Texas; Interstate; US; State; Former; Toll; Loops; Spurs; FM/RM; Park; Rec
← FM 1956	→ FM 1958

Farm to Market Road 1957 (FM 1957) is a Farm to Market Road in Texas. Located in Medina and Bexar counties, the 15.983-mile-long (25.722 km) highway serves as an arterial street through the growing western suburbs of San Antonio. FM 1957 is known as Potranco Road within Bexar County.

The modern routing of this highway was originally defined in 1954. Since then, FM 1957's western terminus has been extended to FM 471 near Rio Medina, and the entire routing along Culebra Road was transferred to FM 3487. Before the current routing was established, FM 1957 was also the designation for a highway in Borden County from 1951 to 1954, now part of FM 1610.

== Route description ==
FM 1957 begins at FM 471 near Rio Medina, as a two-lane country road. It then traverses mostly rural, undeveloped land, before reaching the Bexar–Medina county line, where it becomes Potranco Road. In far western Bexar County, Potranco Road travels through recently built, patchy, residential developments. Development becomes somewhat heavier after the highway passes State Highway 211 (SH 211), but FM 1957 still displays mostly rural characteristics until the highway reaches Loop 1604, at which point it enters the San Antonio city limits. Now four-to-five lanes wide, with two lanes in each direction and an intermittent center turn lane, the legislative definition of FM 1957 becomes UR 1957; however, Potranco Road remains signed as FM 1957.

The highway continues eastward, serving residential developments, commercial outlets, and John Paul Stevens High School. It intersects with SH 151, where development once again becomes patchy. The most notable development along this stretch of Potranco is a National Security Agency data center. State maintenance ends at an intersection with Culebra Road (formerly FM 3487), slightly west of Interstate 410 (I-410). Potranco Road continues as a city street until Ingram Road.

== History ==
=== Previous designation ===
FM 1957 was formerly designated as a highway in Borden County, defined on November 20, 1951. This road traveled from U.S. Highway 180 near Gail to Union school, a distance of 8.5 miles (13.7 km). The former FM 1957 was combined with FM 1610 on September 30, 1954.

=== Current designation ===
The present-day FM 1957 was defined on October 15, 1954. The original routing was along Culebra Road from its intersection with Grissom Road (FM 471) to Potranco Road, which it followed to the Medina County line, a distance of 13.8 miles (22.2 km). The highway gained a 0.1-mile (0.16 km) spur connection to Loop 13 (present-day I-410) on November 21, 1956. On October 31, 1957, FM 1957 was extended to its present western terminus, at FM 471 near Rio Medina. This added 5.3 miles (8.5 km) to the highway. On December 30, 1988, the entire routing along Culebra Road was transferred to the newly created FM 3487. (FM 3487 would be deleted on December 18, 2014.) The Texas Department of Transportation (TxDOT) started defining urban roads on June 27, 1995, at which time the segment of FM 1957 east of Loop 1604, measuring 5.4 miles (8.7 km), was transferred to the newly defined Urban Road 1957 (UR 1957). The designation of this segment reverted to FM 1957 with the elimination of the Urban Road system on November 15, 2018.

On May 9, 2016, construction began to widen FM 1957 from two to four lanes between SH 211 and Loop 1604. The project was financed with a pass-through partnership between Bexar County and TxDOT, with the county providing initial funding and the state reimbursing the costs later. Construction finished on July 19, 2019.

== Junction list ==
County	Location	mi	km	Destinations	Notes
Medina		0.000	0.000	FM 471	
Bexar		6.496	10.454	SH 211 (Hill Country Parkway)	
Bexar	San Antonio	11.069	17.814	Loop 1604 (Charles W. Anderson Loop)	Interchange
Bexar	San Antonio	13.941	22.436	SH 151 (Raymond Stotzer Freeway)	Interchange
Bexar	San Antonio	15.983	25.722	To Culebra Road (Connally Loop) / I-410; Potranco Road	Former FM 3487; roadway continues past Culebra Road as Potranco Road
1.000 mi = 1.609 km; 1.000 km = 0.621 mi
