= U.S. Route 90 in Texas =

Section of U.S. Numbered Highway in Texas, United States

U.S. Highway 90
- US 90 highlighted in red

Route information
- Maintained by TxDOT
- Length: 607.633 mi (Note: Official mileage is shorter than actual mileage. TxDOT considers US 90 to be discontinuous at, rather than concurrent with, Interstate Highways and US Highways with lower numbers.) (977.891 km)
- Existed: 1927–present

Major junctions
- West end: I-10 BL / SH 54 in Van Horn
- I-10 / I-35 / US 87 in San Antonio; I-37 in San Antonio; I-10 in Seguin; SH 130 Toll in Seguin; I-45 in Houston; I-69 / US 59 in Houston
- East end: I-10 / US 90 at the Louisiana state line in Orange

Location
- Country: United States
- State: Texas
- Counties: Culberson, Jeff Davis, Presidio, Brewster, Pecos, Terrell, Val Verde, Kinney, Uvalde, Medina, Bexar, Guadalupe, Caldwell, Gonzales, Fayette, Colorado, Austin, Waller, Fort Bend, Harris, Liberty, Jefferson, Orange

Highway system
- United States Numbered Highway System; List; Special; Divided; Highways in Texas; Interstate; US; State; Former; Toll; Loops; Spurs; FM/RM; Park; Rec
← SH 89	→ SH 90

U.S. Route 90 (US 90) is a major east–west highway in the U.S. state of Texas with large portions of it running concurrently with I-10. US 90 begins at Bus. I-10 in Van Horn, travels through San Antonio and Houston, and continues on into the state of Louisiana.

== Route description ==
=== Van Horn to San Antonio ===
US 90 begins in Van Horn at an intersection with Bus. I-10 and SH 54. After crossing I-10, US 90 travels in a southeastern direction towards Marfa, where it starts an overlap with US 67. The two routes remain concurrent to east of Alpine. Here, US 90 travels south and runs parallel to the US–Mexico Border near the Rio Grande. After crossing the Amistad Reservoir and running through Del Rio, US 90 turns to the east towards Brackettville. It runs through Uvalde and Medina counties before entering San Antonio, where it serves as a major freeway. Multiple stack interchanges are under construction at the intersections at Loop 1604 and I-410. The highway has a major junction with SH 151 as it continues eastward through the city's inner westside as the Cleto Rodriguez Freeway before reaching an interchange with I-10 and I-35 at the southwest corner of Downtown.

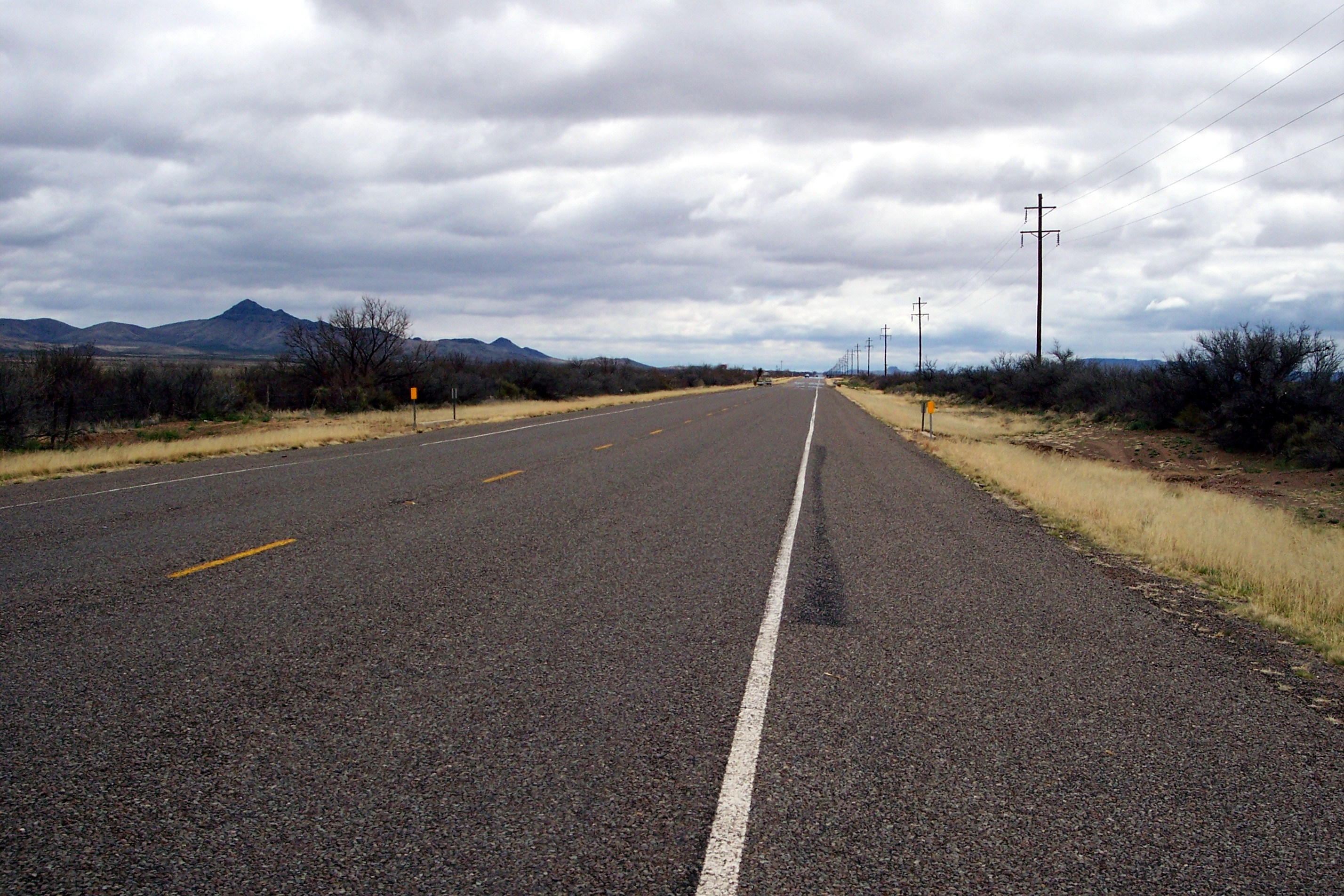
South of Van Horn

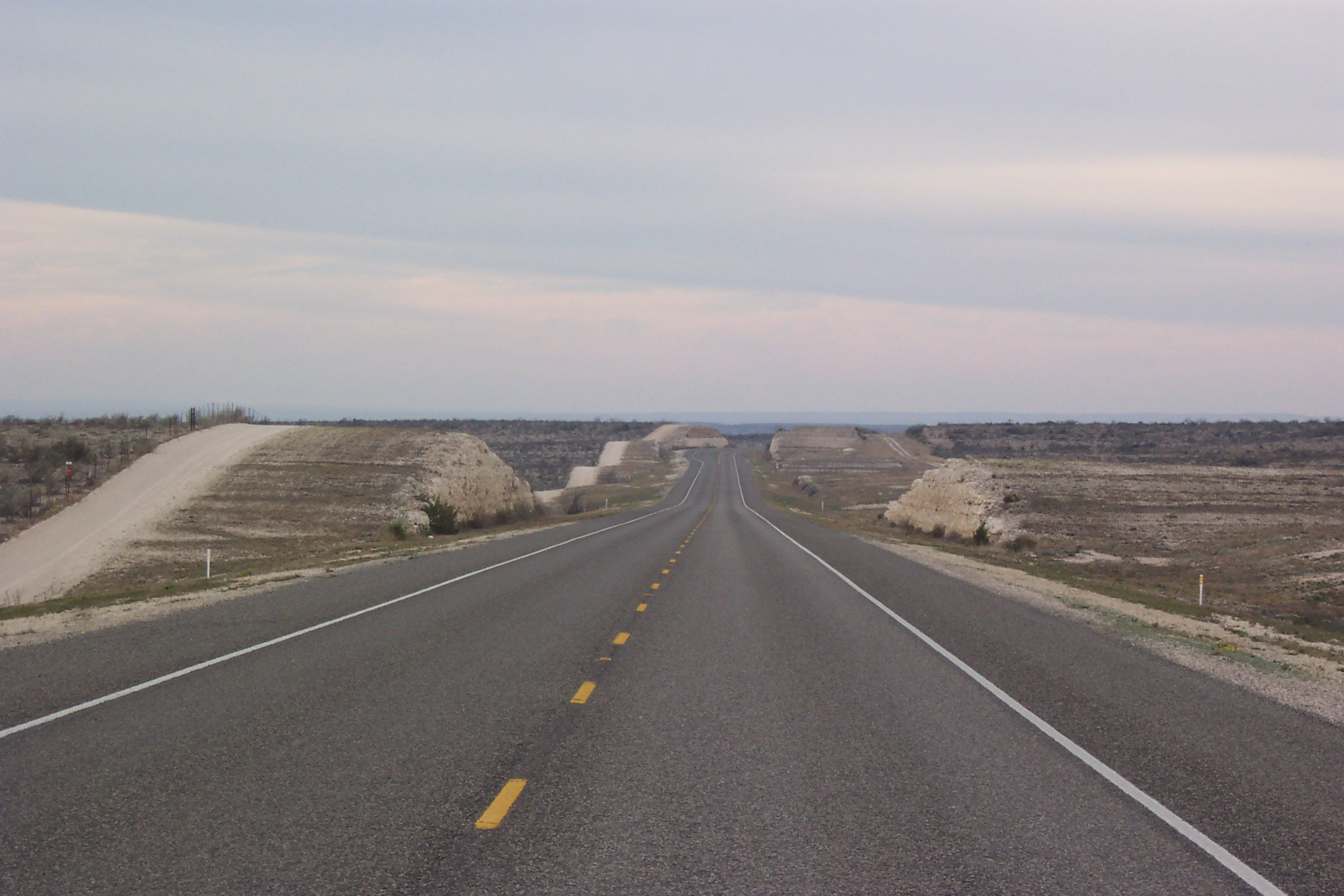
West of Del Rio

=== San Antonio to Houston ===
East of Downtown San Antonio, US 90 multiplexes with I-10. This overlap ends in Seguin, and continues where the two highways continually cross each other en route to Houston. US 90 once again duplexes with I-10 east of Columbus briefly separating near Brookshire and continue overlapping from Katy all the way to Houston. At I-610 east of Houston, US 90 becomes independently known as the Crosby Freeway.

The Crosby Freeway from east of Beltway 8 to east of Runneburg Road in Crosby, was constructed in the early 1990s and opened to traffic in 1992. After several delays, construction work on the inner section of the freeway began in 2006 and was opened to traffic in January 2011. The western terminus of the Crosby Freeway connects to the I-610 and I-10 interchange via two freeway ramps:

- a ramp from westbound Crosby Freeway, joining an exit ramp from westbound I-10 to enter southbound I-610
- a newly constructed two-lane exit ramp from eastbound I-10 connecting to eastbound Crosby Freeway.

The previous interchange was a four-level stack interchange though the new interchange is not a full five-level stack.

Because of funding constraints, two sections of the freeway inside Beltway 8 were not built to full freeway standards: a half-mile section over Greens Bayou and an approximately mile-long section east of Normandy Street. As of December 2012, only the feeder roads have been constructed, with space reserved in the median for future freeway mainlanes. Unlike most new freeway extensions in the Houston area built in recent decades, the Crosby Freeway is not tolled. Also unlike most of Houston's existing freeways and tollways, the Crosby Freeway does not have continuous feeder roads.

The Crosby Freeway has four to six mainlanes for its entire length.

=== Houston to Louisiana ===
US 90 (known as the Crosby Freeway) heads northeast leaving Houston and ends its freeway status in Crosby. US 90 then continues traveling east through Beaumont and is locally known as College Street, passes by Baptist Hospital Beaumont and meets I-10 at a T-interchange. It then passes through Orange and has a business route (Business US 90-Y). It then crosses the Sabine River into Louisiana towards Lake Charles. With the exception of an 11-mile-long (18 km) section with only two (briefly three) lanes between Liberty and Devers, US 90 has at least four lanes between Crosby and the Louisiana state line.

== Major intersections ==
County	Location	mi	km	Destinations	Notes
Culberson	Van Horn	0.0	0.0	I-10 BL to SH 54 – Guadalupe Mountains National Park, Carlsbad Caverns National Park	Access to Culberson Hospital; BL-10 is former US 80
Culberson	Van Horn	0.2	0.32	I-10 – San Antonio, El Paso	I-10 exit 140A
Culberson		12.0	19.3	FM 1523 south	
Culberson	Lobo	17.8	28.6	FM 1523 north	
Jeff Davis		21.6	34.8	FM 2017 north	
Jeff Davis		45.5	73.2	RM 505 – Fort Davis National Historic Site, Davis Mountains State Park, McDonald Observatory and Visitor Center	
Presidio	Marfa	73.0	117.5	RM 2810 south (Hoover Street)	
Presidio	Marfa	73.6	118.4	US 67 south / SH 17 north – Fort Davis, Fort Davis National Historic Site, McDonald Observatory and Visitor Center, Presidio	West end of US 67 overlap
Brewster		98.3	158.2	FM 1703 north	
Brewster	Alpine	99.7	160.5	SH 118 north (5th Street) – Fort Davis, Fort Davis National Historic Site, McDonald Observatory and Visitor Center	West end of SH 118 overlap
Brewster	Alpine	100.1	161.1	SH 118 south (Cockrell Street) – Big Bend National Park Headquarters	East end of SH 118 overlap
Brewster	Alpine	100.2	161.3	SH 223 north (North Harrison Street)	
Brewster	Altuda	107.9	173.6	US 67 north – Fort Stockton	East end of US 67 overlap
Brewster	Marathon	130.5	210.0	US 385 south – Big Bend National Park Headquarters	West end of US 385 overlap
Brewster		131.6	211.8	US 385 north – Fort Stockton	East end of US 385 overlap
Pecos	No major junctions				
Terrell	Sanderson			US 285 north – Fort Stockton	
Terrell	Dryden			SH 349 north – Sheffield, Iraan	
Terrell				RM 1865 north – Pumpville	
Val Verde				Loop 25 east – Langtry, Judge Roy Bean Museum	
Val Verde				Loop 25 west – Langtry, Judge Roy Bean Museum	
Val Verde				Pecos River Bridge over Pecos River	
Val Verde				PR 67 – Seminole Canyon State Historical Park	
Val Verde	Comstock			RM 1024 north – Pandale	
Val Verde	Comstock			SH 163 north – Ozona, Barnhart	
Val Verde				Spur 406 – Amistad National Recreation Area	
Val Verde				Spur 349 – Port of Entry, Amistad Dam, Amistad Reservoir, Amistad National Recreation Area, Governors Landing	
Val Verde				Spur 454 – Amistad National Recreation Area	
Val Verde	Del Rio			Loop 79 south – Sonora, Junction, Uvalde	
Val Verde	Del Rio			US 277 north / US 377 north – Rocksprings, Junction, Sonora	west end of US 277 / US 377 overlap
Val Verde	Del Rio			Spur 239 south (East Gibbs Street) / Spur 297 south (Veteran's Boulevard) – Ciudad Acuña, Business District	East end of US 377 overlap
Val Verde	Del Rio			US 277 south (Bedell Avenue) – Eagle Pass, Laredo	East end of US 277 overlap
Val Verde	Del Rio			RM 2523 – Carta Valley	
Val Verde	Del Rio			Loop 79 – Sonora, Junction, Eagle Pass	Interchange
Kinney				RM 3008 north to RM 2523 – Rocksprings	
Kinney				RM 693 south to US 277 – Quemado	
Kinney	Brackettville			RM 2804	
Kinney	Brackettville			Loop 166 east	
Kinney	Brackettville			RM 3348 south (Las Moras Road) – Fort Clark Springs	
Kinney	Brackettville			RM 334 / RM 674 – Rocksprings, Kickapoo Cavern State Park	
Kinney	Brackettville			SH 131 south – Spofford, Eagle Pass	
Kinney	Brackettville			Loop 166 west	
Kinney				FM 1572 west – Spofford	
Uvalde				RM 1022 south – Blewett	
Uvalde				Nueces River Bridge over Nueces River	
Uvalde				FM 2369 east (Dunbar Lane) to FM 1403 – Rocksprings	
Uvalde	Uvalde			FM 481 south – Eagle Pass	
Uvalde	Uvalde			FM 1052 north	
Uvalde	Uvalde			FM 1435 south (Evans Street)	West end of FM 1435 overlap
Uvalde	Uvalde			FM 1435 north (Grove Street)	East end of FM 1435 overlap
Uvalde	Uvalde			US 83 / SH 55 north (Getty Street) – Leakey, Junction, Rocksprings, Crystal City, Laredo	
Uvalde	Uvalde			FM 1023 north (4th Street)	West end of FM 1023 overlap
Uvalde	Uvalde			FM 1023 south (Garner Field Road) to FM 1049 – Uvalde Garner Field Airport	East end of FM 1023 overlap; Access to Uvalde Memorial Hospital
Uvalde	Uvalde			FM 3447 north	
Uvalde	Uvalde			FM 1574 south to FM 1023 – Airport	
Uvalde				FM 2369 west – Uvalde	
Uvalde	Knippa			FM 1049 north – Concan	West end of FM 1049 overlap
Uvalde	Knippa			FM 1049 south to FM 1023	East end of FM 1049 overlap
Uvalde				FM 2730 north to SH 127	
Uvalde	Sabinal			SH 127 north / RM 187 – Utopia, Leakey, Concan, Garner State Park, Pearsall	
Medina	D'Hanis			FM 1796 north	
Medina	D'Hanis			FM 2200 south – Yancey	
Medina	Hondo			FM 1250 east to FM 462	
Medina	Hondo			FM 462 north / Avenue M – Tarpley	West end of FM 462 overlap
Medina	Hondo			FM 462 south / Avenue E – Yancey	East end of FM 462 overlap; access to Medina Community Hospital
Medina				SH 173 – Bandera, Devine	Interchange
Medina	Castroville			FM 1343 south to County Road 4516 / SH 173 – Quihi	
Medina	Castroville			FM 471 north – Rio Medina	West end of FM 471 overlap
Medina	Castroville			FM 471 south – Castroville Airport, La Coste, Natalia	East end of FM 471 overlap
Bexar				SH 211	Interchange
Bexar				Montgomery Road	Interchange
Bexar	San Antonio			Loop 1604 (Anderson Loop)	Interchange; west end of freeway
Bexar	San Antonio			Hunt Lane / Ray Ellison Drive	no direct eastbound exit
Bexar	San Antonio			I-410 / SH 16 – Airport	I-410 exit 6
Bexar	San Antonio			Loop 13 (Military Drive) – Lackland AFB	
Bexar	San Antonio			Old Highway 90	No direct westbound exit
Bexar	San Antonio			Callaghan Road	
Bexar	San Antonio			Acme Road	No direct eastbound exit (signed at Callaghan Road)
Bexar	San Antonio			SH 151 (Stotzer Freeway) – SeaWorld	Westbound exit and eastbound entrance
Bexar	San Antonio			36th Street – Port San Antonio	
Bexar	San Antonio			General McMullen Drive	
Bexar	San Antonio			Cupples Road	No direct eastbound exit (signed at General McMullen Drive)
Bexar	San Antonio			Spur 371 (General Hudnell Drive) – Port San Antonio	Westbound exit and eastbound entrance
Bexar	San Antonio			Zarzamora Street	Eastbound exit only
Bexar	San Antonio			Loop 353 south (Nogalitos Street)	Eastbound exit and westbound entrance
Bexar	San Antonio			I-10 west / I-35 / US 87 north – El Paso, Austin, Laredo	West end of I-10 / US 87 overlap; signed as exit 572
see I-10
Guadalupe	Seguin			I-10 east – Houston	East end of I-10 overlap; eastbound exit and westbound entrance; US 90 east follows exit 603
Guadalupe				FM 725 to I-10 – McQueeney, Stockdale	
Guadalupe	Seguin			US 90 Alt. east / FM 464 west to I-10 – McQueeney, Gonzales	
Guadalupe	Seguin			SH 46 (Sam Flores Drive) to US 90 Alt. / I-10 – New Braunfels, Gonzales	
Guadalupe	Seguin			FM 78 west (Eighth Street) to I-10 – Marion, Schertz	
Guadalupe	Seguin			Bus. SH 123 (North Austin Street) to I-10 – San Marcos, Stockdale	
Guadalupe	Seguin			FM 466 east (North King Street) – Cost	
Guadalupe	Seguin			SH 123 to I-10 – San Marcos, Stockdale	
Guadalupe	Seguin			I-10 – San Antonio, Houston	I-10 exit 612
Guadalupe	Seguin			SH 130 Toll north – Austin	SH 130 exit 496
Guadalupe	Kingsbury			FM 2438 south to US 90 Alt. / I-10	
Guadalupe	Kingsbury			FM 1104 east to I-10	
Caldwell	Luling			US 183 north / SH 80 to I-10 – Lockhart, San Marcos, Nixon	West end of US 183 overlap
Caldwell	Luling			US 183 south to I-10 – Gonzales	East end of US 183 overlap
Gonzales	Harwood			FM 794 south to I-10 – Gonzales	
Gonzales				SH 304 to I-10 – Bastrop, Gonzales	
Gonzales	Waelder			SH 97 west / FM 1115 north to I-10 / FM 1296 – Smithville, Gonzales	
Gonzales	Waelder			FM 1680 south – Moulton	
Gonzales				I-10 – Houston, San Antonio	I-10 exit 653
Fayette	Flatonia			FM 2762 west to FM 1115 – Cistern	
Fayette	Flatonia			SH 95 south – Moulton, Shiner	West end of SH 95 overlap
Fayette	Flatonia			SH 95 north to I-10 – Smithville, Bastrop, Komensky	East end of SH 95 overlap
Fayette	Flatonia			FM 609 north to I-10 – La Grange	
Fayette				FM 1295 south – Praha, Komensky	
Fayette	Engle			FM 2238 north to I-10 – Freyburg	
Fayette	Schulenburg			FM 2672 north – High Hill	
Fayette	Schulenburg			FM 957 south – Hallettsville	
Fayette	Schulenburg			Loop 222 (Lyons Avenue) to US 77 – Hallettsville	
Fayette	Schulenburg			US 77 to I-10 – La Grange, Hallettsville	
Fayette				FM 1579 east	
Fayette				I-10 – San Antonio, Houston	I-10 exit 677
Fayette				FM 1383 north – Dubina, Ammannsville	
Colorado	Weimar			FM 155 north – La Grange	West end of FM 155 overlap
Colorado	Weimar			FM 155 south to I-10 – Sublime	East end of FM 155 overlap
Colorado				I-10 / Hattermann Lane – Houston, San Antonio	I-10 exit 689
Colorado	Glidden			FM 2434 west to I-10 – Oakland	
Colorado				SH 71 to I-10 – La Grange, Austin, El Campo	Interchange
Colorado	Columbus			FM 806 south (Cardinal Lane) – Rock Island	
Colorado	Columbus			Bus. SH 71 (Fannin Street) to I-10 – La Grange, El Campo	
Colorado	Columbus			Spur 52 (Milam Street)	
Colorado	Columbus			Colorado River Bridge over Colorado River	
Colorado				I-10 west – San Antonio	West end of I-10 overlap; US 90 west follows exit 698
see I-10
Austin	Sealy			I-10 east / FM 3538 south – Houston	East end of I-10 overlap; US 90 east follows exit 718
Austin	Sealy			Loop 350 to SH 36 / I-10 / SH 60 – Bellville, Wallis, Wharton, Rosenberg	
Austin	Sealy			I-10 west / Outlet Center Drive – San Antonio	West end of I-10 overlap; westbound exit and eastbound entrance; US 90 west follows exit 721
see I-10
Waller				I-10 east / Peach Ridge Road / Donigan Road – Houston	East end of I-10 overlap; US 90 east follows exit 729
Waller	Brookshire			FM 1489 south to I-10 – Simonton, Orchard	
Waller	Brookshire			FM 359 north / FM 362 north – Pattison, Hempstead, Waller	West end of FM 359 overlap
Waller	Brookshire			FM 359 south to I-10 – Fulshear, Pecan Grove	East end of FM 359 overlap
Waller				FM 2855 north	
Fort Bend	Katy			FM 1463 south to FM 359 – Richmond, Pecan Grove	
Harris	Katy			I-10 west / Katy Mills Boulevard – San Antonio	West end of I-10 overlap; US 90 west follows exit 741
see I-10
Harris	Houston			I-10 east – Beaumont	East end of I-10 overlap; eastbound exit and westbound entrance; US 90 east follows exit 775B
Harris	Houston			I-610 – Pasadena, Galveston, Lufkin	I-10 exit 775A; I-610 exit 26A; no access from I-610 south to US 90 east
Harris	Houston			Mercury Drive	
Harris	Houston			FM 526 south (Maxey Road) to Wallisville Road / I-10 – Galena Park	West end of FM 526 overlap
Harris	Houston			FM 526 north (Normandy Street) to I-10 – Galena Park	East end of FM 526 overlap
Harris				Beltway 8 / Sam Houston Tollway to I-10 – Humble, Pasadena / Uvalde Road	Access to Sam Houston Tollway via frontage road
Harris				Miller Road No. 3	
Harris				Miller Road No. 2	
Harris	Sheldon			Sheldon Road	
Harris	Sheldon			Frontage Road	Eastbound exit and westbound entrance
Harris	Barrett–Crosby line			County Road	
Harris	Barrett–Crosby line			FM 1942 / FM 2100 (US 90 Bus. west) – Huffman, Mont Belvieu	No direct westbound exit (signed at Runneburg Road)
Harris	Barrett–Crosby line			Krenek Road / Runneburg Road	Interchange; east end of freeway
Liberty				SH 99 Toll (Grand Parkway) – Spring, Baytown	
Liberty				FM 1413 south	
Liberty	Dayton			SH 146 south to I-10 – Mont Belvieu, Baytown	West end of SH 146 overlap
Liberty	Dayton			SH 321 north to FM 1008 / FM 1960 – Cleveland, Kenefick, Humble	
Liberty	Dayton			FM 1409 south – Old River-Winfree	
Liberty	Liberty			Loop 227 north / FM 2684 south to SH 146 – Rye, Livingston	
Liberty	Liberty			FM 563 south to I-10 – Anahuac, Wallisville	
Liberty	Liberty			SH 146 north – Hardin, Rye, Livingston	East end of SH 146 overlap
Liberty	Ames			FM 160 (MLK Road)	
Liberty	Ames			FM 1909 north to FM 160	
Liberty				FM 2830 north to FM 160	
Liberty	Raywood			FM 770 south to FM 563 / I-10 – Anahuac, Wallisville	West end of FM 770 overlap
Liberty	Raywood			FM 770 north – Daisetta, Saratoga, Kountze	East end of FM 770 overlap
Liberty	Devers			SH 61 south to I-10 / FM 1410 – Anahuac, Hankamer, Winnie	
Liberty				FM 1009 east – Nome	
Jefferson	Nome			FM 1009 west – Liberty	
Jefferson	Nome			SH 326 north / FM 365 east to FM 1406 / I-10 – Sour Lake, Fannett, Winnie	
Jefferson	Beaumont			FM 364 (Major Drive) to I-10 / SH 105	
Jefferson	Beaumont			I-10 / US 69 / US 96 / US 287 – Lake Charles, Lufkin, Jasper, Houston, Port Arthur	I-10 exit 851
see I-10
Orange	Orange			I-10 east / US 90 east – Lake Charles, Lafayette	Louisiana state line
1.000 mi = 1.609 km; 1.000 km = 0.621 mi: Concurrency terminus; Incomplete access; Tolled

== See also ==
- Interstate 10 in Texas
- U.S. Route 90 Alternate (Texas)

== Notes ==
U.S. Route 90
Previous state: Terminus	Texas	Next state: Louisiana
