= Texas State Highway 151 =

State highway in Texas

State Highway 151
- Stotzer Freeway
- SH 151 highlighted in red

Route information
- Maintained by TxDOT
- Length: 10.667 mi (17.167 km)
- Existed: 1984–present

Major junctions
- West end: Loop 1604 in San Antonio
- I-410 in San Antonio
- East end: US 90 in San Antonio

Location
- Country: United States
- State: Texas
- Counties: Bexar

Highway system
- Highways in Texas; Interstate; US; State; Former; Toll; Loops; Spurs; FM/RM; Park; Rec
← SH 150	→ SH 152

State Highway 151 (SH 151), also known as the Raymond E. Stotzer Jr. Freeway, is a 10.7-mile (17.2 km) state highway in the U.S. state of Texas that runs from Loop 1604 to U.S. Highway 90 (US 90) in San Antonio. SH 151 is a limited-access freeway for its entire length with the exception of its junction with Loop 1604 at its western terminus where a traffic light controls the junction. The routing of the freeway was first conceived in 1983 and construction was conducted in phases through the 1980s and 1990s until completion in 2004. The freeway provides access to the western part of San Antonio, the SeaWorld San Antonio theme park, Chase, Northwest Vista College, and the future site of a Microsoft data center.

== History ==
=== Previous designation ===
The first SH 151 was designated on March 19, 1930, from Mason to Menard as a renumbering of SH 29A. On February 11, 1938, SH 151 was extended west to Eldorado. On April 29, 1942, the section of SH 151 west of Menard was cancelled and renamed FM 43, with the section west of the roadway north of the San Saba River 6.5 miles (10.5 km) west of US 83 cancelled. On March 17, 1948, FM 43 became part of SH 151, extending it to Eldorado. On August 22, 1951, SH 151 was cancelled and transferred to SH 29 which was extended.

=== Planning ===
The route of SH 151 was originally conceived in 1983 by local land developer Charles Martin Wender and later received approval by Raymond Stotzer, the district supervisor of the Texas Department of Transportation at the time and for whom the freeway would later be named. The freeway was a joint effort with landowners providing 85% of the right-of-way worth US$26 million and half of the cost of the frontage roads worth $14 million with the city buying the rest. During the construction of the freeway, the Texas Turnpike Authority considered SH 151 as a candidate to become a toll road, but this drew much criticism from local politicians and the Bexar County commissioners and did not come to fruition. SH 151 was designated on March 14, 1984, on its current route.

=== Construction ===
The freeway was built in phases with the frontage roads constructed first followed by the main lanes. The overpasses for Wiseman Boulevard, Westover Hills Boulevard and Military Drive between I-410 and Loop 1604 were completed over the main lanes of SH 151 in 1987. In 1988, the I-410 overpasses over the SH 151 frontage roads were completed, as was the interchange with US 90 at the eastern terminus. Also completed in 1988 were the frontage road bridges over Leon and Slick Ranch Creek, which enabled traffic to travel the entire corridor from Loop 1604 to US 90 by way of the frontage roads. The main lane overpasses at FM 1957 (Potranco Road) and Ingram Road were completed in 1997. The overpasses at Pinn Road and Historic Old Highway 90 (known as Enrique M. Barrera Parkway from 2015 to 2022) were completed in 1998, and completed at Callaghan Road in 2000. Construction of the freeway was completed in 2004.

== Route description ==
SH 151 begins at Loop 1604, the outer loop around San Antonio, on the west side of San Antonio and from there follows a southeastern path through the western part of the city. The highway provides access to the SeaWorld San Antonio theme park as well as industry along its corridor to include Chase, Hyatt Hill Country Resort, World Savings, Philips semiconductor, the National Security Agency campus, QVC, American Funds, Maxim Integrated Products, and the Northwest Vista College, as well as the nearby Southwest Research Institute. Microsoft has also selected the corridor for a $550 million data center. The highway continues to the southeast to a junction with Interstate 410 (I-410), the inner loop around San Antonio. A new direct, flyover interchange was built connecting eastbound TX-151 with northbound I-410, alleviating traffic at its busiest stretches. A fully directional, stack interchange has been planned, partially funded, and is set to begin construction in 2019. The highway continues to the southeast through mainly undeveloped land until it merges with US 90. According to the San Antonio Master Thoroughfare Plan, there are plans to extend SH 151 westward from Loop 1604 to SH 211. The plan also shows the construction of an interchange at Loop 1604.

Traffic volumes are low to moderate for the entire length of the freeway ranging from 14,500 average annual daily traffic (AADT) just east of Loop 1604 to 46,000 AADT between Farm to Market Road 1957 (FM 1957) and I-410. Between 2003 and 2005, traffic volumes have remained steady between I-410 and US 90. In that same time period, traffic between I-410 and Loop 1604 has increased by 1,100-7,000 AADT.

== Future ==
The Texas Department of Transportation (TxDOT) is currently undertaking a project to widen State Highway 151 (SH 151) from four to six lanes—three lanes in each direction—with the addition of a concrete center barrier. The new lanes are being constructed within the existing grassy median between the eastbound and westbound roadways. As part of this expansion, an underground storm drain system will be installed. The project also includes the construction of a new connector ramp from westbound SH 151 to northbound Loop 1604, which will replace the existing tight "J"-shaped ramp. The new connector will branch off from SH 151 just after the current exit to northbound Loop 1604 and will consist of two lanes, primarily at ground level. It will include a braided overpass crossing a newly extended northbound access road. After merging onto the existing Loop 1604 mainlanes via an expanded overpass at Culebra Road, the northbound roadway will feature four lanes—two from the new connector and two existing through lanes. The far-right lane will exit at Shaenfield Road, while the adjacent right lane will end shortly thereafter. Given that approximately 25 percent of northbound traffic over Culebra exits at Shaenfield, this configuration is not expected to create a significant bottleneck.

This project had been expected to start in 2025, but unexpected funding became available in late 2022, allowing the project to accelerate.

As of Nov 2026, the project is under construction and is approximately 98% complete.

== Exit list ==
The entire route is in San Antonio, Bexar County. All exits are unnumbered.

mi	km	Destinations	Notes
0.0	0.0	Loop 1604 (Anderson Loop)	Interchange; roadway continues west as Alamo Ranch Parkway
0.1	0.16	Loop 1604 north	Overpass to Loop 1604 North and Shaenfield Rd. Exit
0.4	0.64	Frontage Road	Goes directly to Culebra Rd. on Frontage Road
0.9	1.4	Wiseman Boulevard	No eastbound exit
1.8	2.9	Westover Hills Boulevard	Access to Christus Santa Rosa Hospital Westover Hills
2.8	4.5	Military Drive	Access to SeaWorld San Antonio and Aquatica San Antonio
3.7	6.0	Hunt Lane	Westbound exit and eastbound entrance
4.4	7.1	FM 1957 (Potranco Road) / Ingram Road	
5.5	8.9	I-410 / SH 16 (westbound) I-410 / SH 16 – San Antonio (eastbound)	I-410 north exit 9, south exit 9A
6.7	10.8	Military Drive, Pinn Road	No eastbound exit
8.5	13.7	Callaghan Road	
9.2	14.8	Historic Old Highway 90	Eastbound exit is via Callaghan Road exit
10.7	17.2	36th Street	Eastbound exit and westbound entrance
10.7	17.2	US 90 east – San Antonio	Eastbound exit and westbound entrance
1.000 mi = 1.609 km; 1.000 km = 0.621 mi: Incomplete access
