= Texas State Highway 211 =

Highway in San Antonio, Texas

State Highway 211
- Hill Country Parkway
- SH 211, highlighted in red

Route information
- Maintained by TxDOT
- Length: 18.807 mi (30.267 km)
- Existed: 1986–present

Major junctions
- South end: US 90 near Castroville
- North end: SH 16 in San Geronimo

Location
- Country: United States
- State: Texas
- Counties: Bexar, Medina

Highway system
- Highways in Texas; Interstate; US; State; Former; Toll; Loops; Spurs; FM/RM; Park; Rec
← SH 210	→ SH 212

State Highway 211 (SH 211), also known as the Texas Research Parkway and the Hill Country Parkway, is an 18.8-mile (30.3 km) state highway west of the city of San Antonio in the U.S. state of Texas. It runs from U.S. Highway 90 (US 90) to SH 16, crossing between Bexar County and Medina County. Designated in 1986 as an access route to the Texas Research Park, the route was composed of two disconnected sections—a southern segment from US 90 to Farm to Market Road 1957 (FM 1957) and a northern segment from FM 471 to SH 16—before the gap was closed in 2022.

== Route description ==
SH 211 begins at a diamond interchange with US 90 in western Bexar County. The route travels to the north as a two-lane highway and is known as either the Texas Research Parkway or the Hill Country Parkway, providing access to the Texas Research Park and a Citi service center. After 3.7 miles (6.0 km), it reaches FM 1957 just east of the Bexar–Medina county line. The route continues north, crossing back and forth between the two counties before reaching FM 471 in Medina County. From here, SH 211 crosses back over into Bexar County, passing briefly through the San Antonio city limits, before ending at an at-grade intersection with SH 16. The section between FM 471 and SH 16 features the occasional passing lane in both directions.

The northern segment of the roadway includes a design to provide protection to the Edwards Aquifer, the drinking water supply of San Antonio. To prevent runoff from the highway entering the aquifer, a 555-foot-long (169 m) bridge was sealed to prevent it from leaking and an aqueduct was constructed nearby to carry the runoff.

The traffic volume of the highway differs between the southern and northern sections, with the southern section seeing a traffic volume six times that of the northern section. In 2005, the southern section had a traffic volume of 6,450 annual average daily traffic (AADT), which increased to 6,700 AADT in 2006. The traffic volume of the northern section saw a slight increase from 2005 to 2006 as well: in 2005, it had a traffic volume of 1,000 AADT near the southern end of the road and 1,300 AADT near the northern end, and in 2006, these numbers had increased to 1,050 and 1,550 AADT, respectively.

== History ==
A previous route numbered SH 211 was designated on August 1, 1934, on a route from Brenham northward to Independence. On January 26, 1935, it was extended north to Clay. On July 15, 1935, this extension was cancelled. On January 6, 1939, the remainder of SH 211 was cancelled. On January 22, 1940, the SH 211 was restored south of Old Independence. On October 26, 1942, SH 211 was cancelled, and its mileage was transferred to FM 50 and Spur 197.

The current alignment was designated on March 31, 1986, from US 90 northward to SH 16. On November 29, 1988, the designation was extended northeastward from SH 16 to FM 3351; however, this segment was never constructed. The southern portion, from US 90 to FM 1957, was the first to be completed with the interchange at US 90 and the bridge over Lucas Creek completed in 1990. The northern portion, from FM 471 to SH 16, was completed in 1991 with the completion of the bridges over San Geronimo Creek.

Plans to close the gap between FM 1957 and FM 471 were stymied by insufficient funds available to complete the nearly 8-mile (12.9 km) project and right-of-way acquisition. In 2007, TxDOT only had $7.7 million of the $30 million required for construction costs. Bexar County was to pay for the balance of the project costs, with TxDOT reimbursing the county when funds became available. Relocation assistance was provided to landowners to persuade them to sell their property for the project. Local opposition to the extension cited greater highway needs elsewhere, environmental concerns in the corridor, and a reluctance to sell land needed for the highway as chief concerns of the highway, while support for the route indicated the belief that it would provide relief to nearby Loop 1604.

The findings for the environmental impact study were released by July 2017, and construction broke ground in late 2020. The route was completed and opened to traffic in November 2022. The total cost of the project was $33 million.

== Major intersections ==
County	Location	mi	km	Destinations	Notes
Bexar		0.0	0.0	US 90 – Hondo, San Antonio	Southern terminus; continues as Masterson Road
Bexar		3.7	6.0	FM 1957 – Rio Medina, San Antonio	
Medina		11.4	18.3	FM 471 – Castroville, San Antonio	Future interchange
Bexar		18.8	30.3	SH 16 (Bandera Road) – Bandera, San Antonio	Northern terminus
1.000 mi = 1.609 km; 1.000 km = 0.621 mi
