= Texas State Highway Loop 1604 =

Loop highway around San Antonio, Texas

State Highway Loop 1604
- Anderson Loop
- Loop 1604 highlighted in red

Route information
- Maintained by TxDOT
- Length: 94.387 mi (151.901 km)
- Existed: 1977–present

Major junctions
- Loop around San Antonio
- I-10 / US 90 east of San Antonio; US 87 near Adkins; US 181 US 181 near Elmendorf; I-37 near Losoya; US 281 US 281 near Losoya; I-35 in Von Ormy; US 90 west of San Antonio; SH 151 in San Antonio; I-10 / US 87 in San Antonio; US 281 US 281 in San Antonio; I-35 in Universal City

Location
- Country: United States
- State: Texas

Highway system
- Highways in Texas; Interstate; US; State; Former; Toll; Loops; Spurs; FM/RM; Park; Rec
← Loop 820	→ Loop 1

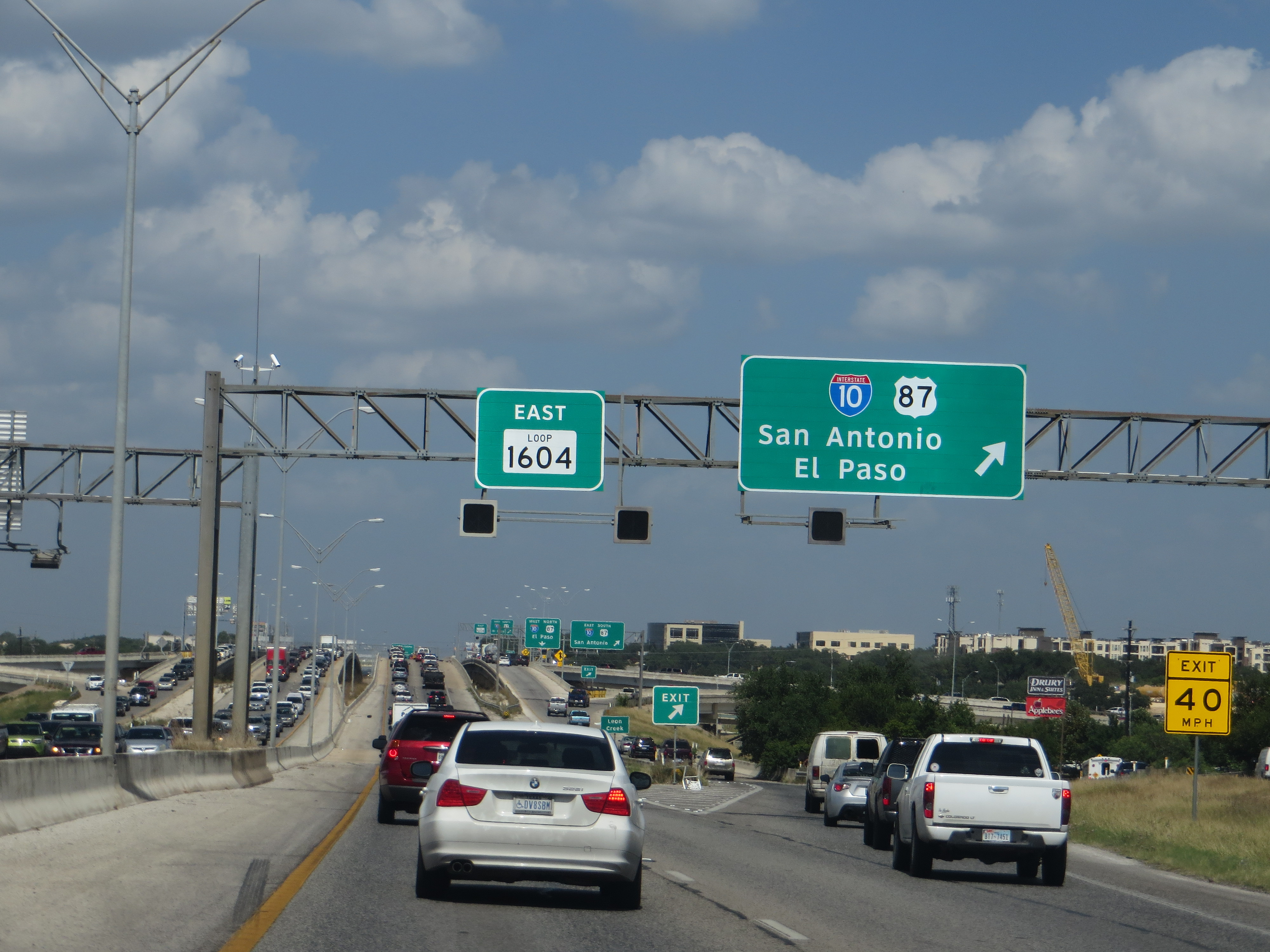
Loop 1604 as of 2016

Loop 1604 is the outer highway loop encircling San Antonio, Texas, spanning approximately 95.6 miles (153.9 km). Originally constructed as a two-lane highway, the northern segment of the route, from US Highway 90 (US 90) in western San Antonio to Kitty Hawk Road in northeastern Bexar County, has been upgraded to a four-lane freeway. Loop 1604 is designated the Charles W. Anderson Loop in honor of former Bexar County Judge Charles W. Anderson, who died from cancer in 1964 after serving for 25 years.

== Route description ==
Loop 1604 forms a complete loop around the city of San Antonio and is the outer of two loops around the city with Interstate 410 (I-410) as the inner loop. The route has portions that are built to freeway standards, portions built as a divided highway, and portions that are just a two-lane rural road. As with I-410, the city's inner loop, the northern half is more urbanized and the southern half, for the most part, remains rural.

The loop officially begins and ends at I-10 east of San Antonio. It heads south from I-10 as a two-lane road and turns towards the southeast and intersects Farm to Market Road 1346 (FM 1346), FM 1518, and FM 3465 while turning back towards the south and reaching a junction with US 87 in Lone Oak. Continuing to the south, Loop 1604 has a second intersection with FM 3465, an intersection with FM 3432 as the road turns towards the southwest and a junction with US 181 near Calaveras Lake. Heading southwest from US 181, the highway intersects FM 327 as it enters the city of Elmendorf. It intersects FM 327 once again as it leaves Elmendorf heading towards the southwest. At FM 1303, Loop 1604 turns towards the west before a junction with I-37.

Continuing west through the southern portions of Bexar County, the loop intersects FM 1937 (South Flores Road) and FM 3499 before an interchange with US 281. The highway continues to the west to an interchange with State Highway 16 (SH 16), passing to the south of the Toyota Motor Manufacturing Texas plant. The highway continues to the west and begins to curve towards the north as it enters the city limits of Somerset and an intersection with FM 2790 (Somerset Road). Completing the turn to the north as it leaves Somerset, Loop 1604 heads north to an interchange with I-35. The highway heads north after the I-35 interchange to an intersection with FM 2536 (Old Pearsall Road) before an interchange with US 90.

North of US 90, Loop 1604 becomes a four-lane divided highway with median crossings only located at traffic lights and turnarounds at those traffic lights to facilitate traffic flow of vehicles turning around to go in the opposite direction. The highway enters the San Antonio city limits near Marbach Road and follows near the city limit. Major intersections along this stretch include Marbach Road, FM 1957 (Potranco Road) and Wiseman Boulevard. The loop continues north near the campus of Northwest Vista College to a junction with the western terminus of SH 151. The intersection is signalized but southbound traffic is not required to stop due to no left hand turns from SH 151 to Loop 1604. Westbound traffic from SH 151 is either routed to the northbound main lanes of Loop 1604 or the northbound frontage road of Loop 1604. In 2016, TxDOT unveiled plans to upgrade the section from US 90 to SH 151 to a freeway starting in late 2016, and Google Earth satellite imagery showed this freeway under construction in 2017-2018.

The freeway portion starts as the loop curves towards the northeast at the junction with SH 151. Loop 1604 has diamond interchanges at FM 471 (Culebra Road), Shaenfield Road, New Guilbeau Road, Braun Road, and SH 16 (Bandera Road).

The freeway continues to the northeast with interchanges at FM 1560 (Hausman Road) and Babcock Road. The freeway begins to head east at the Babcock Road interchange and passes near the University of Texas at San Antonio (UTSA) main campus, the Shops at La Cantera and Six Flags Fiesta Texas. The freeway continues to the east to an interchange with I-10. East of I-10, the freeway has interchanges with Lockhill-Selma Road, FM 1535 (Military Highway), Bitters Road and Huebner Road. As it passes through the north side of San Antonio, the freeway has interchanges with FM 2696 (Blanco Road) and Stone Oak Parkway before reaching US 281, which connect by way of an interchange completed in December 2012.

Continuing east from the US 281 interchange, the freeway has interchanges with several local roads to include Gold Canyon Drive, Redland Road, Bulverde Road, and O'Connor Road. The freeway continues east to interchanges with Judson Road and Green Mountain Road before it curves to head to the southeast. Now heading southeast, the freeway has an interchange at FM 2252 near Rolling Oaks Mall and an interchange at Lookout Road before it leaves the San Antonio city limits. Upon leaving San Antonio, the freeway enters the Live Oak city limits before a cloverleaf interchange at I-35. Southeast of I-35, Loop 1604 enters the Universal City city limits before reaching an interchange with SH 218, which provides access to Randolph Air Force Base. TxDOT has upgraded two intersections between the interchange at SH 218 and Kitty Hawk Road, where Loop 1604 used to have two at-grade turn-offs, one at Palisades Drive and one at Granada Drive. These intersections are now separated from the main lanes and are relegated to the service road at these locations. The same applies to two former at-grade turn-offs southeast of the Kitty Hawk Road interchange at Meadowland Drive and Byrd Boulevard. Meadowland and Byrd now do not intersect the main lanes of Loop 1604 . The last two interchanges of the freeway are located at FM 1976 and FM 78. Once in the Converse city limits, Loop 1604 remains a 4-lane divided highway, but has at-grade intersections. The highway passes by the western boundary of Randolph Air Force Base before curving to the south. The highway re-enters San Antonio city limits prior to its interchange at I-10 at its official beginning and end.

== History ==
Loop 1604 was designated on June 30, 1977, after FM 1604 was combined with a large portion of FM 1518 to complete a larger loop around San Antonio. Three bypasses were completed in the early 1980s: on December 12, 1979, FM 1937 was extended to replace a bypassed portion near Losoya; on March 3, 1981, FM 327 was designated as the through route when Loop 1604 was rerouted around Elmendorf; and in 1983, Loop 1604 was routed around Lone Oak, creating FM 3465 over the previous routing.

New overpasses were built at Shaenfield Road, New Guilbeau Road, and Braun Road. TxDOT has expanded the project further south to SH 151 and US 90, creating a direct flyover overpass from southbound Loop 1604 to eastbound US 90. The expansion was deemed necessary due to the growth of San Antonio's far west side.

== Future ==
TxDOT plans to widen Loop 1604 from four lanes to ten between SH 16 (Bandera Road) near Helotes and I-35 in Universal City. The expansion will add two travel lanes and one High-occupancy vehicle lane (HOV lane) in each direction. Additionally, the project will replace the cloverleaf interchange at I-10 with a five-level stack interchange, reconfigure the layout of exit and entrance ramps, along with other improvements. Construction on Segment 1, extending from Bandera Road to I-10, officially began on July 26, 2021, and is substantially complete. Segment 2, which involves the reconstruction of the Loop 1604/Interstate 10 interchange, commenced in July 2022 and was originally scheduled for completion in mid-2027; however, construction has been accelerated, as six of its flyover ramps have been completed by late 2025. As of February 5, 2026, all eight ramps have opened to traffic and this segment should be finished by late 2027. Construction on Segment 3, from I-10 to US 281, began in November 2021 and is scheduled for completion in mid-2026. Segment 4, running from US 281 to Redland Road, began in April 2024 and is scheduled for completion in late 2027. Segment 5, from Redland Road to Judson Road, began in March 2025 and is scheduled for completion in 2028. Segment 6, extending from Judson Road to I-35, was originally scheduled to begin in 2028 but has been accelerated, with construction now expected to start in late 2026.

Along Segment 3, there is a project that will convert the access road intersections at Loop 1604 and Blanco Road (FM 2696) from conventional intersections to a diverging diamond interchange (DDI) which would be the first in the city.

== Junction list ==
The entire route is in Bexar County. All exits are unnumbered.

Location	mi	km	Destinations	Notes
San Antonio	0.0	0.0	I-10 / US 90 – San Antonio, Houston	Proposed flyover interchange; I-10 exit 587
St. Hedwig	3.6	5.8	FM 1346 (St. Hedwig Road) – St. Hedwig, La Vernia	
Adkins	6.2	10.0	FM 1518 north – St. Hedwig	
	7.0	11.3	FM 3465 south – Lone Oak	
	7.7	12.4	US 87 – Stockdale, San Antonio	Interchange
	8.4	13.5	FM 3465 north – Lone Oak	
	10.7	17.2	FM 3422 (New Sulphur Springs Road) – Calaveras Lake	
	16.0	25.7	US 181 (Corpus Christi Highway) – Floresville, San Antonio	Interchange
	17.2	27.7	FM 327 west – Elmendorf	
	19.4	31.2	FM 327 east – Elmendorf	
	21.4	34.4	FM 1303 south (South Flores Road) – Floresville	
	24.4	39.3	I-37 – Corpus Christi, San Antonio	I-37 exit 125
	26.5	42.6	FM 1937 north (South Flores Road)	
	28.1	45.2	US 281 – Pleasanton, San Antonio	Interchange
San Antonio	35.6	57.3	SH 16 (Palo Alto Road) – Poteet, San Antonio, Palo Alto College	Interchange
Somerset	38.8	62.4	FM 2790 west – Somerset, Lytle	
Somerset	40.4	65.0	FM 2173 south – Somerset	
Von Ormy	43.2	69.5	I-35 – Laredo, San Antonio	Proposed roundabout; I-35 exit 140
	43.5– 43.9	70.0– 70.7	Quintana Road	Proposed interchange
	45.0	72.4	FM 2536 (Old Pearsall Road) – Atascosa, San Antonio	Proposed interchange
Macdona	46.7	75.2	Macdona-LaCoste Road, Nelson Road	Proposed interchange
	49.5	79.7	FM 143 west / Pue Road – Fabian Dale Dominguez State Jail	Proposed left turns
San Antonio	50.7	81.6	US 90 – Hondo, San Antonio	Interchange; counterclockwise end of freeway
San Antonio	51.2	82.4	Spurs Ranch	Counterclockwise exit and clockwise entrance
San Antonio	52.0	83.7	Marbach Road	
San Antonio	53.6	86.3	Falcon Wolf / Dove Canyon	
San Antonio	54.6	87.9	FM 1957 (Potranco Road)	
San Antonio	55.6	89.5	Military Drive	
San Antonio	56.6	91.1	Wiseman Boulevard	
San Antonio	57.6	92.7	SH 151 east (Stotzer Freeway) / Alamo Ranch Parkway – SeaWorld	Access to Christus Santa Rosa Hospital Westover Hills
San Antonio	58.3	93.8	FM 471 (Culebra Road)	
San Antonio	60.3	97.0	Shaenfield Road	
San Antonio	61.5	99.0	New Guilbeau Road	Counterclockwise exit via Braun Road exit
San Antonio	62.0	99.8	Braun Road	
San Antonio	62.8	101.1	SH 16 – Bandera, San Antonio	
San Antonio	64.6	104.0	FM 1560 / West Hausman Road	
San Antonio			Kyle Seale Parkway	Clockwise exit via FM 1560 / West Hausman Road exit
San Antonio	66.2	106.5	Babcock Road	Clockwise entrance. No Counterclockwise entrance
San Antonio	66.8	107.5	Chase Hill Boulevard, Brenan Avenue, La Cantera Parkway – UTSA, The Shops at La Cantera, Fiesta Texas	No counterclockwise entrance
San Antonio			I-10 / US 87 (McDermott Freeway) – San Antonio, El Paso	
San Antonio			Valero Way	Access to Vance Jackson Road, Tradesman Drive and Lockhill-Selma Road clockwise. Clockwise exit and entrance
San Antonio	68.0	109.4	Vance Jackson Road, Tradesman Drive, Lockhill-Selma Road	
San Antonio	69.6	112.0	Lockhill-Selma Road	Counterclockwise exit also serves Vance Jackson Road. Clockwise exit temporarily closed due to construction
San Antonio	70.6	113.6	FM 1535 (NW Military Highway) – Shavano Park, Camp Bullis	
San Antonio	71.0	114.3	Bitters Road, Rogers Ranch Parkway	Clockwise exit also serves Huebner Road
San Antonio			Huebner Road	No direct exits or entrances (clockwise exit signed at Bitters Road; counterclockwise exit signed at Blanco Road)
San Antonio	73.8	118.8	FM 2696 (Blanco Road)	
San Antonio	74.9	120.5	Stone Oak Parkway, Voigt Drive – Hollywood Park	Access to North Central Baptist Hospital and Methodist Stone Oak Hospital
San Antonio			Frontage Road	
San Antonio	75.3	121.2	US 281 – Johnson City, San Antonio, Int'l Airport	5-level stack interchange
San Antonio	77.0	123.9	Gold Canyon Drive	Counterclockwise exit via Redland Road exit; no counterclockwise entrance
San Antonio	78.0	125.5	Redland Road	
San Antonio	79.5	127.9	Bulverde Road	
San Antonio	80.4	129.4	O'Connor Road	
San Antonio	81.4	131.0	Judson Road	
San Antonio	82.5	132.8	Green Mountain Road	
San Antonio	83.7	134.7	FM 2252 (Nacogdoches Road)	
San Antonio	84.3	135.7	Lookout Road	
Live Oak	85.4	137.4	IKEA-RBFCU Parkway	Clockwise exit only
Universal City	85.8	138.1	I-35 – Austin, San Antonio	I-35 exit 172; cloverleaf interchange; to be replaced by stack interchange as part of I-35 NEX project
Universal City	86.9	139.9	SH 218 (Pat Booker Road) – Universal City, JBSA-Randolph	Clockwise exit via I-35 exit
Universal City	88.1	141.8	Kitty Hawk Road	
Universal City	88.9	143.1	FM 1976	Clockwise entrance and counterclockwise exit via Kitty Hawk Road exit and U-Turn
Universal City	89.5	144.0	FM 78 – JBSA-Randolph, Converse	Interchange; temporary clockwise end of freeway
Converse	90.9	146.3	Rocket Lane	Proposed interchange
Converse	91.6	147.4	Lower Seguin Road	Proposed interchange
San Antonio	92.5	148.9	Graytown Road	Proposed interchange
San Antonio	93.5	150.5	Binz-Englemann Road	Proposed interchange
1.000 mi = 1.609 km; 1.000 km = 0.621 mi: Incomplete access
