= Adkins, Texas =

- Unincorporated community
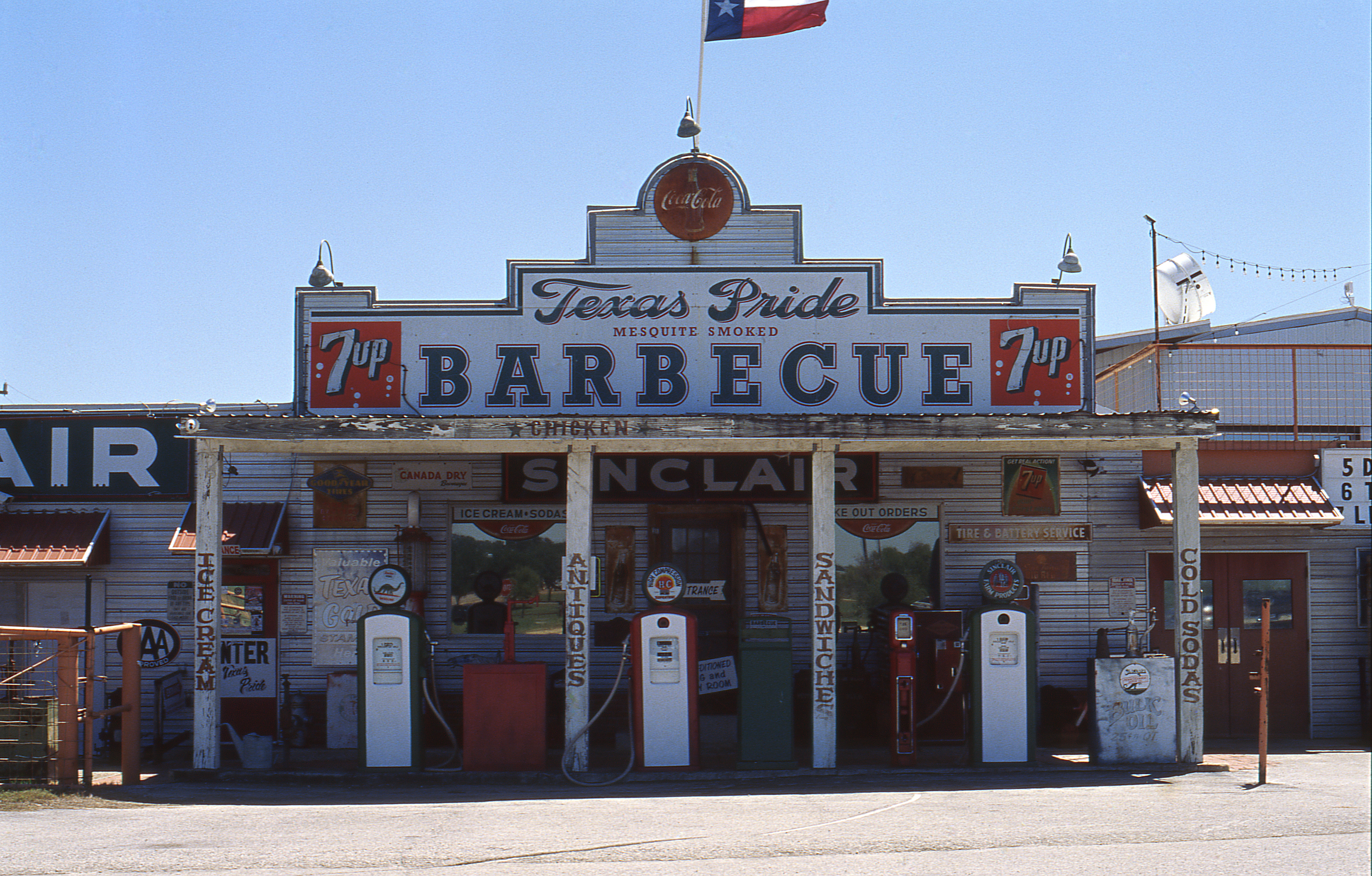

- Location within Texas Location within the United States
- Coordinates: 29°23′35″N 98°14′14″W
- Country: United States
- State: Texas
- County: Bexar
- Elevation: 558 ft (170 m)

Population
  - Estimate (2019): 1,428
  - Density: 597.74/sq mi (230.79/km^{2})
- Time zone: UTC−6 (Central (CST))
  - Summer (DST): UTC−5 (CDT)
- ZIP code: 78101
- Area codes: 210, 726
- FIPS code: 48-41764
- GNIS feature ID: 1360813

Adkins is an unincorporated community located partly in eastern Bexar County, Texas, United States. It is located within the Greater San Antonio metropolitan area.

== History ==
Adkins started as a flag station on the Galveston, Harrisburg and San Antonio Railway in the 1880s and was named for William Adkins Jones, who was given a land grant for the depot and switchyard that would develop there. A post office was established at Adkins in 1896. There were two churches and 100 people in the community in 1910, which went up to 150 in 1940 with four businesses. Its growth continued with San Antonio developing into a major city, with 241 residents and 32 businesses in 1990.

== Geography ==
Adkins is located on Farm to Market Road 1518 and Texas State Highway Loop 1604, 14 mi (23 km) east of San Antonio in eastern Bexar County.

== Education ==
Adkins had its own school in 1910. Today, the community is served by the East Central Independent School District. Salem Sayers Baptist Academy also serves the community.

== In popular culture ==
Adkins is home to Texas Pride Barbecue, where the season 3 finale of Diners, Drive-Ins and Dives was filmed.
