= Texas State Highway 152 =

State Highway oklahoma/texas

State Highway 152
- SH 152 highlighted in red

Route information
- Maintained by TxDOT
- Length: 108.60 mi (174.77 km)
- Existed: 1930–present

Major junctions
- West end: US 87 / US 287 in Dumas
- US 60 in Pampa; US 83 in Wheeler
- East end: SH-152 at the Oklahoma state line near Sweetwater, OK

Location
- Country: United States
- State: Texas

Highway system
- Highways in Texas; Interstate; US; State; Former; Toll; Loops; Spurs; FM/RM; Park; Rec
← SH 151	→ SH 153

State Highway 152 (SH 152) is a Texas state highway that runs from Dumas east to the Oklahoma state line. The route was originally designated in 1930 between Pampa and Wheeler, but was extended both west (replacing State Highway 209 from Pampa to Borger) and east to its current termini in 1938.

== Route description ==
SH 152 begins at an intersection with an intersection with US 87 and US 287 in Dumas, and travels east through farmland along the outside northern edge of the Canadian River valley. It reaches large oil reserves before reaching Stinnett and an intersection with Texas State Highway 136 and Texas State Highway 207. All three routes travel south out of Stinnett 10 miles to Borger. The route continues southeast through oil country before returning to fertile farmlands just west of Pampa, where it joins up with U.S. Route 60. The two routes continue east out of Pampa for about 10 miles before SH 152 splits off and continues due east. The route continues east, reaching an intersection with US Route 83 in Wheeler, before terminating at the Oklahoma state line, where it continues as OK-152.

== Route history ==
SH 152 was first designated on March 19, 1930 as the route between Pampa and Wheeler through northern Gray and Wheeler Counties as a renumbering of SH 33A. On December 24, 1935, a highway was temporarily designated from Wheeler to the Oklahoma state line. On April 19, 1938, the extension east to Oklahoma became official. On June 21, 1938, the route was extended west to Borger, replacing SH 209. The route was also designated north concurrent with then-State Highway 117 until they reached Stinnett, where the route would be extended west via Dumas to Hartley, replacing SH 178. On July 15, 1938, SH 152 Spur was designated to Old Mobeetie. On October 24, 1938, SH 152 Spur was taken over. On September 26, 1939, the section from Dumas to Hartley was cancelled as it was cosigned with US 87. SH 152 Spur was renumbered as Spur 41. The road to Dumas already existed, but was not fully improved until the late 1940s.

== Business route ==
Business State Highway 152-B is a business loop that runs through Stinett, from SH 136/SH 207 west to SH 152 west of the city. The route was created in 1939 as Loop 79, which was redesignated Business SH 152-B on June 21, 1990.

== Junction list ==
County	Location	mi	km	Destinations	Notes
Moore	Dumas			US 87 / US 287	
Moore				FM 1284	
Moore				FM 1060	
Moore				FM 1913	
Hutchinson				FM 1923	
Hutchinson				RM 687	
Hutchinson	Stinnett			SH 136 / SH 207	Begin concurrency with SH 136 and SH 207
Hutchinson				RM 2277	
Hutchinson				FM 1559	
Hutchinson	Borger			Spur 140 / Spur 245	
Hutchinson	Borger			Spur 119	
Hutchinson	Borger			SH 136 / SH 207	End concurrency with SH 136 and SH 207
Hutchinson	Borger			Spur 246	
Hutchinson				FM 2171	
Hutchinson				FM 280	
Carson				FM 1059	
Carson	Skellytown			FM 294	
Gray				FM 2386	
Gray	Pampa			FM 282	
Gray	Pampa			SH 70	Begin concurrency with SH 70
Gray	Pampa			US 60 / SH 70	End concurrency with SH 70, begin concurrency with US 60
Gray	Pampa			SH 273	
Gray	Pampa			Loop 171	
Gray				US 60	End concurrency with US 60
Gray				RM 1474	
Gray				FM 748	
Gray				RM 2857	
Wheeler	Mobeetie			FM 48	
Wheeler				FM 3104	
Wheeler				FM 3182	
Wheeler	Wheeler			US 83	
Wheeler				FM 592	
Wheeler				SH-152	Continuation into Oklahoma
1.000 mi = 1.609 km; 1.000 km = 0.621 mi: Concurrency terminus
