= List of Farm to Market Roads in Texas (1900–1999) =

- Texas Farm to Market Road and Ranch to Market Road markers

Highway names
- Interstates: Interstate Highway X (IH-X, I-X)
- US Highways: U.S. Highway X (US X)
- State: State Highway X (SH X)
- Loops: Loop X
- Spurs: Spur X
- Recreational: Recreational Road X (RE X)
- Farm or Ranch to Market Roads: Farm to Market Road X (FM X); Ranch to Market Road X (RM X)
- Park Roads: Park Road X (PR X)

System links
- Highways in Texas; Interstate; US; State; Former; Toll; Loops; Spurs; FM/RM; Park; Rec

Farm to Market Roads in Texas are owned and maintained by the Texas Department of Transportation (TxDOT).

== RM 1900 ==
Ranch to Market Road 1900
- Location: Mason County
- Length: 7.582 mi (12.202 km)
- Existed: June 2, 1967–present

Ranch to Market Road 1900 (RM 1900) is located in Mason County. It runs from SH 29 east of Art to RM 2618.

RM 1900 was designated on June 2, 1967, from SH 29, 1 mile (1.6 km) east of Art, north 7.6 miles (12.2 km) to a point 1.0 mile (1.6 km) north of Fly Gap. On October 1, 1968, the southern terminus was moved east 1 mile (1.6 km), shortening the route by 0.6 miles (0.97 km). On March 5, 1976, the road was extended north 0.6 miles (0.97 km) to RM 2618.

=== FM 1900 (1951) ===
Farm to Market Road 1900
- Location: Shackelford
- Existed: December 18, 1951–January 14, 1952

The original FM 1900 was designated on November 20, 1951, from US 283 (later US 380, now SH 6) in Moran westward 3.6 miles (5.8 km). The route became part of FM 576 on January 14, 1952.

=== FM 1900 (1956) ===
Farm to Market Road 1900
- Location: Jefferson County
- Existed: December 13, 1956–October 30, 1958

FM 1900 was designated on December 13, 1956, from the Boulevard at Pleasure Island in Port Arthur south to a point near Sabine Pass. This route, the main levee south of Port Arthur, was formerly SH 362. FM 1900 was cancelled upon completion of construction on October 30, 1958, and turned over to the city of Port Arthur (though it was open and signed on October 27, 1958). The route became SH 82 in 1975.

== FM 1901 ==
Farm to Market Road 1901
- Location: Pecos, Crockett, and Upton counties
- Length: 15.419 mi (24.814 km)
- Existed: December 18, 1951–present

Farm to Market Road 1901 (FM 1901) is located in Pecos, Crockett, and Upton counties.

FM 1901 begins at FM 11 approximately 2.6 miles (4.2 km) north of Bakersfield in eastern Pecos County and proceeds to the northeast. The road passes through Bakersfield Valley before crossing the Pecos River into Crockett County. The road traverses the northwest corner of Crockett County for approximately 4 miles (6.4 km) where the road turns to the north. The road enters southwestern Upton County approximately 1.6 miles (2.6 km) south of its northern terminus with FM 305 along the southern edge of McCamey.

FM 1901 was designated on December 18, 1951, from FM 305 south of McCamey south to the Pecos County line; the same day, it was extended to FM 11. The extension was reverted on February 15, 1952, but was ultimately restored.

== FM 1902 ==
Farm to Market Road 1902
- Location: Tarrant and Johnson counties
- Length: 7.672 mi (12.347 km)
- Existed: December 15, 1955–present

Farm to Market Road 1902 (FM 1902) is located in Tarrant and Johnson counties.

FM 1902 begins at a signaled-controlled intersection with FM 917 west of Joshua. The highway travels in a northern direction through suburban areas, passing by R.C. Loflin Middle and Caddo Grove Elementary schools. FM 1902 turns northwest near an intersection with County Road 913, then crosses under the Chisholm Trail Parkway (CTP) toll road without any access between the two. The highway turns in a slight northeast direction at County Road 915, then has an interchange with the CTP. FM 1902 turns back into a more northward direction near County Road 1015 and enters Tarrant County near Floyd Hampton Road. The highway travels through more rural areas before ending at an intersection with FM 1187 west of Crowley.

The current FM 1902 was designated in 1955 from FM 917 to FM 1187, replacing part of FM 731.

=== FM 1902 (1951) ===
Farm to Market Road 1902
- Location: Walker County
- Existed: November 20, 1951–May 18, 1955

A previous route numbered FM 1902 was designated on November 20, 1951, from US 75 (now SH 75) at Crabbs Prairie west 6.5 miles (10.5 km) to a road intersection. On October 26, 1954, the road was extended 7.7 miles (12.4 km) northwest to the Grimes County line. FM 1902 was cancelled on May 18, 1955, and became a portion of FM 1696.

== FM 1903 ==
Farm to Market Road 1903
- Location: Hunt County
- Length: 5.741 mi (9.239 km)
- Existed: December 18, 1951–present

Farm to Market Road 1903 (FM 1903) is located in Hunt County. It runs from SH 34 south of Greenville to FM 36 southeast of Caddo Mills.

FM 1903 was designated on December 18, 1951, from SH 34, 6 miles (9.7 km) south of Greenville, west 3.4 miles (5.5 km) to a road intersection. On August 20, 1952, the road was extended west 2.2 miles (3.5 km) to FM 36.

== FM 1904 ==
Farm to Market Road 1904
- Location: Coke County
- Length: 3.876 mi (6.238 km)
- Existed: February 1, 1969–present

Farm to Market Road 1904 (FM 1904) is located in Coke County. It runs from SH 208 in Robert Lee to the west and north for approximately 3.9 miles (6.3 km). Much of the route lies close to the eastern shore of the E.V. Spence Reservoir.

A section of the route was formerly FM 387, which was decommissioned in Coke County in 1969.

=== FM 1904 (1951) ===
Farm to Market Road 1904
- Location: Webb and Jim Hogg counties
- Existed: November 20, 1951–August 5, 1954

FM 1904 was originally designated on November 20, 1951. It was located in Webb and Jim Hogg counties, running from US 59 (now SH 359) south 13.7 miles (22.0 km) via Mirando City to the Jim Hogg County line. On August 26, 1953, the road was extended south 14 miles (23 km) to FM 496 (now SH 16) near Randado. FM 1904 was cancelled on August 5, 1954, and became a portion of FM 649.

=== FM 1904 (1958) ===
Farm to Market Road 1904
- Location: Bailey County
- Existed: October 31, 1958–September 19, 1968

A second route numbered FM 1904 was designated on October 31, 1958. Located in Bailey County, it ran from FM 746, 8 miles (13 km) east of the New Mexico state line, south to FM 298. FM 1904 was cancelled on September 19, 1968, and became a portion of FM 1731.

== FM 1905 ==
Farm to Market Road 1905
- Location: El Paso County
- Length: 2.169 mi (3.491 km)
- Existed: November 20, 1951–present

== FM 1906 ==
Farm to Market Road 1906
- Location: Wheeler County
- Length: 7.894 mi (12.704 km)
- Existed: November 30, 1954–present

Farm to Market Road 1906 (FM 1906) is located in Wheeler County. It runs from US 83 south of Wheeler to FM 592 south of Kelton.

FM 1906 was designated on November 30, 1954, on the current route.

=== FM 1906 (1951) ===
Farm to Market Road 1906
- Location: Uvalde County
- Existed: November 20, 1951–June 30, 1954

A previous route numbered FM 1906 was designated on November 20, 1951, from US 83 in north Uvalde northeast to US 90, 5.2 miles (8.4 km) east of Uvalde. FM 1906 was cancelled on June 30, 1954, and removed from the highway system by the request of the Uvalde County Commissioner's Court. The route was revived as an extension of FM 2369 in 1958.

== FM 1907 ==
Farm to Market Road 1907
- Location: Maverick County
- Length: 1.641 mi (2.641 km)
- Existed: November 20, 1951–present

Farm to Market Road 1907 (FM 1907) is located in Maverick County. It runs from US 277 north of Eagle Pass westward to the entrance to the county's hydroelectric power plant.

FM 1907 was designated on November 20, 1951, along the current route.

== FM 1908 ==
Farm to Market Road 1908
- Location: Maverick and Kinney counties
- Length: 22.590 mi (36.355 km)
- Existed: November 20, 1951–present

Farm to Market Road FM 1908 (FM FM 1908) is located in Maverick and Kinney counties. It runs from US 277 northwest of Normandy to SH 131 south of Spofford.

FM 1908 was designated on November 20, 1951, from FM 1591, 2.1 miles (3.4 km) east of US 277, to a point 1.5 miles (2.4 km) north. On December 17, 1952, the road was extended north 8.5 miles (13.7 km) to the Kinney County line. On September 29, 1954, the road was extended northeast 10.5 miles (16.9 km) to SH 131. On October 19, 1956, the road was extended 2.7 miles (4.3 km) to US 277, replacing portions of FM 1590 and FM 1591.

== FM 1909 ==
Farm to Market Road 1909
- Location: Liberty County
- Length: 1.022 mi (1.645 km)
- Existed: February 17, 1971–present

Farm to Market Road 1909 (FM 1909) is located in Liberty County. It runs from FM 160 to US 90.

FM 1909 was designated on February 17, 1971, on the current route.

=== FM 1909 (1951) ===
Farm to Market Road 1909
- Location: San Jacinto County
- Existed: November 20, 1951–March 31, 1970

A previous route numbered FM 1909 was designated on November 20, 1951, from US 190 (now SH 156), 2 miles (3.2 km) south of Point Blank, northeast 3.5 miles (5.6 km) to Patrick's Ferry Community. FM 1909 was cancelled on March 31, 1970: a 1.4-mile (2.3 km) section from new US 190 south to Lake Livingston was transferred to FM 980 and the remaining 2.1 miles were removed altogether due to inundation and rerouting of US 190.

== FM 1910 ==
Farm to Market Road 1910
- Location: Cherokee County
- Length: 4.648 mi (7.480 km)
- Existed: November 20, 1951–present

Farm to Market Road 1910 (FM 1910) is located in Cherokee County. It runs from FM 347 in Dialville to FM 2138 near Union Grove Church.

FM 1910 was designated on November 20, 1951, from FM 347 at Dialville west 5.0 miles (8.0 km) to a road intersection. On August 24, 1955, a 6.0-mile (9.7 km) section from Union Grove Church north to FM 347 near Jacksonville was added. Three months later this section was transferred to FM 2138.

== FM 1911 ==
Farm to Market Road 1911
- Location: Cherokee County
- Length: 18.942 mi (30.484 km)
- Existed: November 20, 1951–present

Farm to Market Road 1911 (FM 1911) is located in Cherokee County. It runs from US 69 south of Alto to a point near the Angelina River.

FM 1911 was designated on November 20, 1951, from US 69 south of Alto south 4.3 miles (6.9 km) to Brunswick. On October 26, 1954, the road was extended south 6.3 miles (10.1 km) to Spur 29 in Forest. On June 13, 1958, the road was extended to US 69 northwest of Wells, replacing Spur 29 (although signage did not change until 1959). On June 2, 1967, the road was extended northeast 3.0 miles (4.8 km) from US 69, and extended northeast another 3.2 miles (5.1 km) to a point near the Angelina River on September 29, 1977.

== FM 1912 ==
Farm to Market Road 1912
- Location: Potter County
- Length: 10.54 mi (16.96 km)
- Existed: December 18, 1951–present

Farm to Market Road 1912 (FM 1912) is located in Potter County.

FM 1912 begins at an intersection with US 287 southeast of Amarillo. The highway travels in a northern direction and travels through Amarillo between FM 2575 and US 60/Bus. I-40. FM 1912 turns west at St. Francis Avenue and continues to run in a western direction before ending at Loop 335.

FM 1912 was designated on December 18, 1951, traveling from US 60 southward to the Randall County line at a distance of 4.8 miles (7.7 km). The highway was extended 5.9 miles (9.5 km) northward and westward to Loop 335 on January 29, 1974. On June 14, 1991, the section of highway south of US 287 was decommissioned. The section of highway between US 60 and US 287 was redesignated Urban Road 1912 (UR 1912) on June 27, 1995. The designation reverted to FM 1912 with the elimination of the Urban Road system on November 15, 2018.

Junction list

The entire route is in Potter County.

Location	mi	km	Destinations	Notes
	0.0	0.0	US 287 – Amarillo, Claude	
	1.3	2.1	I-40 – Amarillo, Groom	I-40 exit 81
Amarillo	2.3	3.7	FM 2575 east	
Amarillo	4.2	6.8	US 60 / I-40 BL (Route 66) – Amarillo, Panhandle	Interchange
	10.0	16.1	SH 136 – Amarillo, Fritch, Borger	
	10.5	16.9	Loop 335	
1.000 mi = 1.609 km; 1.000 km = 0.621 mi

== FM 1913 ==
Farm to Market Road 1913
- Location: Moore County
- Length: 27.424 mi (44.135 km)
- Existed: November 20, 1951–present

Farm to Market Road 1913 (FM 1913) is located in Moore County. It runs from US 87 and SH 354 at Four Way to SH 152.

FM 1913 was designated on November 20, 1951, from US 87 and SH 354 at Four Way east 6.3 miles (10.1 km) to the Canadian River Gas Company Plant. The road was extended east 4.0 miles (6.4 km) on November 21, 1956, another 4.0 miles (6.4 km) east on October 31, 1958, northeast 5.0 miles (8.0 km) on November 23, 1962, and north 7.0 miles (11.3 km) to SH 152 on February 26, 1964.

== FM 1914 ==
Farm to Market Road 1914
- Location: Hale County
- Length: 17.168 mi (27.629 km)
- Existed: November 20, 1951–present

Farm to Market Road 1914 (FM 1914) is located in Hale County. It runs from FM 179 to FM 400 south of Plainview. There is a brief concurrency with I-27.

FM 1914 was designated on November 20, 1951, from FM 594 (now FM 179) east to FM 1424 at Hale Center. On May 21, 1953, the road was extended east 0.4 miles (0.64 km) to US 87 (now I-27). On October 26, 1954, the road was extended east 9.0 miles (14.5 km) to FM 400, creating a concurrency with US 87.

== FM 1915 ==
Farm to Market Road 1915
- Location: Milam County
- Length: 20.196 mi (32.502 km)
- Existed: October 3, 1968–present

Farm to Market Road 1915 (FM 1915) is located in Milam County. It runs from FM 485 at Yarrelton to FM 437 near Davilla. There is a concurrency with US 190 in Buckholts.

FM 1915 was designated on October 3, 1968, from FM 485 at Yarrelton south to US 190 at Buckholts, then from a point on US 190 at Buckholts south to a road intersection at Corinth as a replacement of a section of FM 485. On November 26, 1969, the road was extended south 2.3 miles (3.7 km) to a point 0.3 miles (0.48 km) south of Little River Slough. On September 29, 1977, the road was extended southwest 2.0 miles (3.2 km). On April 25, 1978, the road was extended 2.4 miles (3.9 km) miles to FM 1328. On May 30, 1978, the road was extended 4.3 miles (6.9 km) to FM 437 near Davilla, replacing FM 1328.

=== FM 1915 (1951) ===
Farm to Market Road 1915
- Location: Freestone County
- Existed: November 20, 1951–May 31, 1955

The first use of the FM 1915 designation was in Freestone County, from US 75 (now SH 75) at Dew west to the southern terminus of FM 1451 at Luna. On October 26, 1954, a section from FM 80 south of Freestone northeast to FM 1451 at Luna was added. FM 1915 was cancelled on May 31, 1955, and became a portion of FM 489.

=== FM 1915 (1958) ===
Farm to Market Road 1915
- Location: Harrison and Marion counties
- Existed: April 24, 1958–June 1, 1967

The next use of the FM 1915 designation was in Harrison and Marion counties, from FM 134/SH 43 at or near Karnack north across Cypress Bayou to an intersection with FM 805 in Marion County, then onward to an intersection with SH 49 at or near its junction with SH 43. FM 1915 was cancelled on June 1, 1967, and redesignated SH 43.

== FM 1916 ==
Farm to Market Road 1916
- Location: Dimmit County
- Length: 2.998 mi (4.825 km)
- Existed: November 20, 1951–present

Farm to Market Road 1916 (FM 1916) is located in Dimmit County. It runs from FM 190 (former US 83) north of Asherton to a point 3 miles (4.8 km) southwest.

FM 1916 was designated on November 20, 1951, on the current route.

== FM 1917 ==
Farm to Market Road 1917
- Location: Dimmit County
- Length: 4.597 mi (7.398 km)
- Existed: November 20, 1951–present

Farm to Market Road 1917 (FM 1917) is located in Dimmit County. It runs from SH 85 near the east side of Carrizo Springs to FM 1557.

FM 1917 was designated on November 20, 1951, from FM 1557 north and east to US 83, 3.5 miles (5.6 km) south of Carrizo Springs. On February 24, 1953, the road was rerouted and extended 1.5 miles (2.4 km) to US 83 near Carrizo Springs. On October 31, 1958, the road was extended 1.0 mile (1.6 km) north to SH 85.

== FM 1918 ==
Farm to Market Road 1918
- Location: Dimmit County
- Length: 1.195 mi (1.923 km)
- Existed: November 20, 1951–present

Farm to Market Road 1918 (FM 1918) is located in Dimmit County. It runs from FM 191 to FM 1407.

FM 1918 was designated on November 20, 1951, from US 83, 7 miles (11 km) north of Carrizo Springs, west and north to FM 191. On September 13, 1955, a 0.3-mile (0.48 km) section from the junction of then-present FM 1918 and FM 1407 east to US 83 was transferred to FM 1407.

== RM 1919 ==
Ranch to Market Road 1919
- Location: Foard and Baylor counties
- Length: 27.928 mi (44.946 km)
- Existed: November 30, 1954–present

Ranch to Market Road 1919 (RM 1919) is located in Foard and Baylor counties.

RM 1919 begins at an intersection with US 82 near Seymour. The highway travels in a northern direction and passes near Seymour Municipal Airport at an intersection with FM 2069. RM 1919 turns in a northwest direction at FM 2582. In Foard County, the highway generally runs parallel to the North Wichita River, ending at an intersection with FM 267.

RM 1919 was designated on November 30, 1954, running from a point near Crowell southeastward to a point near Seymour at a distance of 37.0 miles (59.5 km). The highway was rerouted to end at US 82/US 277 near Seymour on January 14, 1957, absorbing part of FM 1153 and all of FM 1604 in the process. On June 27, 1963, a 10.9-mile (17.5 km) section from at or near Crowell to FM 267 was removed from the highway system in exchange for designation of FM 2877. RM Spur 1919 was created near Seymour on March 28, 2002, from a former section of FM 1153.

Junction list

County	Location	mi	km	Destinations	Notes
Baylor		0.0	0.0	US 82 to US 183 / US 277 / US 283 – Wichita Falls, Seymour	
Baylor		0.3	0.48	RM Spur 1919 south	
Baylor		2.2	3.5	FM 2069 west – Red Springs	
Baylor		3.0	4.8	FM 2582 north – Lake Kemp	
Foard		27.9	44.9	FM 267 – Munday, Crowell	
1.000 mi = 1.609 km; 1.000 km = 0.621 mi

=== FM 1919 (1951) ===
Farm to Market Road 1919
- Location: Gregg County
- Existed: December 18, 1951–July 28, 1953

The first use of the FM 1919 designation was in Gregg County, from SH 26 southwest of Longview southeast to SH 149. FM 1919 was cancelled on July 28, 1953, and transferred to FM 1845 (now Loop 281).

=== FM 1919 (1953) ===
Farm to Market Road 1919
- Location: La Salle County
- Existed: September 15, 1953–October 27, 1954

The next use of the FM 1919 designation was in La Salle County, from SH 97 at Los Angeles to a point 9.8 miles (15.8 km) south and west as a replacement of a section of FM 468. FM 1919 was cancelled on October 27, 1954, and became a portion of FM 469.

== FM 1920 ==
Farm to Market Road 1920
- Location: Hemphill and Lipscomb counties
- Length: 21.675 mi (34.883 km)
- Existed: December 18, 1951–present

Farm to Market Road 1920 (FM 1920) is located in Hemphill and Lipscomb counties. It runs from US 60 northeast of Canadian to SH 305 south of Lipscomb.

FM 1920 was designated on December 18, 1951, from US 60, 5 miles (8.0 km) north of Canadian, north 11.4 miles (18.3 km) to a point 1 mile (1.6 km) north of Locust Grove School. On September 27, 1960, the road was extended north 3.6 miles (5.8 km). On November 22, 1960, the road was extended north and east 3 miles (4.8 km), and to SH 305, 2 miles (3.2 km) south of Lipscomb on December 5 of that year, replacing FM 2588.

== FM 1921 ==
Farm to Market Road 1921
- Location: Willacy and Hidalgo counties
- Length: 8.556 mi (13.770 km)
- Existed: November 20, 1951–present

Farm to Market Road 1921 (FM 1921) is located in Willacy and Hidalgo counties. It runs from Bus. US 77 north of Lyford to FM 1015.

FM 1921 was designated on November 20, 1951, from US 77 (later Loop 448, now Bus. US 77), 0.5 miles (0.80 km) north of Lyford, to a point 4.6 miles (7.4 km) west. On May 5, 1966, the road was extended west 4.3 miles (6.9 km) to FM 1015.

== FM 1922 ==
Farm to Market Road 1922
- Location: Wilson County
- Length: 5.096 mi (8.201 km)
- Existed: December 18, 1951–present

Farm to Market Road 1922 (FM 1922) is located in Wilson County. It runs from SH 97 northeast of Floresville to FM 537.

FM 1922 was designated on December 18, 1951, from SH 97, 8 miles (13 km) northeast of Floresville, southeast 2.8 miles (4.5 km) to a road intersection. On October 13, 1954, it was extended southeast 2.4 miles (3.9 km) to FM 537.

== FM 1923 ==
Farm to Market Road 1923
- Location: Hutchinson County
- Length: 9.596 mi (15.443 km)
- Existed: December 18, 1951–present

Farm to Market Road 1923 (FM 1923) is located in Hutchinson County. It runs from FM 1598 to SH 152 west of Stinnett.

FM 1923 was designated on December 18, 1951, from SH 152 west of Stinnett north 5.5 miles (8.9 km) to a road intersection. On February 21, 1952, it was extended north 4.2 miles (6.8 km) to FM 1598.

== FM 1924 ==
Farm to Market Road 1924
- Location: Hidalgo County
- Length: 8.942 mi (14.391 km)
- Existed: November 20, 1951–present

Farm to Market Road 1924 (FM 1924) is located in Hidalgo County. It runs from FM 492 to FM 1926.

FM 1924 was designated on November 20, 1951, from FM 492, 3.1 miles (5.0 km) north of US 83, east 4.0 miles (6.4 km) to SH 107. On September 21, 1955, the road was extended east 2.5 miles (4.0 km) to FM 494. On July 11, 1968, the road was extended east 2.5 miles (4.0 km) to FM 1926. On June 27, 1995, the entire route was transferred to UR 1924, but was changed back to FM 1924 on November 15, 2018.

== FM 1925 ==
Farm to Market Road 1925
- Location: Hidalgo County
- Length: 24.840 mi (39.976 km)
- Existed: November 20, 1951–present

Farm to Market Road 1925 (FM 1925) is located in Hidalgo County. It runs from FM 681 to FM 491. The road is known locally as Monte Cristo Road.

FM 1925 was designated on November 20, 1951, from US 281 (later Loop 113, now Bus. US 281), 1.5 miles (2.4 km) north of Edinburg, east 5.2 miles (8.4 km) to a road intersection. On December 17, 1952, the road was extended east 5.4 miles (8.7 km) to FM 88. On September 21, 1955, the road was extended west 11.4 miles (18.3 km) to FM 681 and east to FM 491, creating a concurrency with FM 1015. On June 27, 1995, the section from UR 2220 to UR 907 was transferred to UR 1925, but was changed back to FM 1925 on November 15, 2018.

== FM 1926 ==
Farm to Market Road 1926
- Location: Hidalgo County
- Length: 7.327 mi (11.792 km)
- Existed: November 20, 1951–present

Farm to Market Road 1926 (FM 1926) is located in Hidalgo County. It runs from SH 107 to Bus. US 83. The road is known locally as N 23rd Street.

FM 1926 was designated on November 20, 1951, from US 83 (later Loop 374, now Bus. US 83) south 7.4 miles (11.9 km) to Spur 241 with a concurrency with FM 1016. This currency was removed on June 10, 1952, when that section of FM 1016 was transferred to FM 1926. On April 20, 1954, the road was extended north 0.8 miles (1.3 km) to FM 495 (now SH 495). On June 28, 1963, the road was extended north 0.9 miles (1.4 km) to the northern city limit of McAllen and a break was added at FM 495 (it was removed on November 16, 1965). On May 6, 1964, the road was extended north 5.5 miles (8.9 km) to SH 107. On June 4, 1970, the section from Loop 374 to Spur 241 was redesignated as Spur 115. On June 27, 1995, the entire route was transferred to UR 1926, but was changed back to FM 1926 on November 15, 2018.

== FM 1927 ==
Farm to Market Road 1927
- Location: Ward County
- Length: 14.709 mi (23.672 km)
- Existed: December 18, 1951–present

Farm to Market Road 1927 (FM 1927) is located in Ward County. It runs from I-20 at Pyote to FM 1776.

FM 1927 was designated on December 18, 1951, from US 80 (now I-20) to a point 10.0 miles (16.1 km) south. On May 24, 1968, a section from the junction with FM 3114 to a point 1.716 miles (2.762 km) south was removed from the highway system due to completion of FM 3114. FM 1927 was instead extended southeast to FM 1776 three days later, replacing FM 3114.

== FM 1928 ==
Farm to Market Road 1928
- Location: Lamb County
- Existed: May 23, 1951–September 19, 1968

Farm to Market Road 1928 (FM 1928) was located in Lamb County. No highway currently uses the FM 1928 designation.

FM 1928 was designated on May 23, 1951, from FM 54, 0.2 miles (0.32 km) east of the Bailey County line, north and east 9.5 miles (15.3 km) to FM 303. On December 3, 1953, the road was extended east 7.0 miles (11.3 km) to US 84. FM 1928 was cancelled on September 19, 1968, and became a portion of FM 37.

== FM 1929 ==
Farm to Market Road 1929
- Location: Tom Green, Concho, and Coleman counties
- Length: 39.246 mi (63.160 km)
- Existed: December 17, 1952–present

Farm to Market Road 1929 (FM 1929) is located in Tom Green, Concho, and Coleman counties. It runs from FM 1692 to FM 503.

FM 1929 was designated on December 17, 1952, from FM 381, 1 mile (1.6 km) east of Lowake, east 8.6 miles (13.8 km) to US 83. On September 20, 1961, the road was extended west 5.3 miles (8.5 km) to FM 1692, creating a concurrency with FM 381. On May 28, 1963, the road was extended east 4.6 miles (7.4 km) from US 83, another 4.0 miles (6.4 km) east on October 2, 1970, and yet another 3.0 miles (4.8 km) east to RM 2134 (now FM 2134) on November 25, 1973. On November 29, 1988, a 13.3-mile (21.4 km) section from a point east of Concho to FM 503 was added.

=== FM 1929 (1951) ===
Farm to Market Road 1929
- Location: Armstrong County
- Existed: December 18, 1951–December 17, 1952

A previous route numbered FM 1929 was designated on December 18, 1951, from US 287 at Goodnight north 7.7 miles (12.4 km) to the Salt Fork of the Red River. FM 1929 was cancelled on December 17, 1952, and transferred to FM 294.

== FM 1930 ==
Farm to Market Road 1930
- Location: Jim Wells County
- Length: 7.867 mi (12.661 km)
- Existed: December 18, 1951–present

Farm to Market Road 1930 (FM 1930) is located in Jim Wells County. It runs from US 281 south of Alice to FM 665 (former FM 736) east of Alice.

FM 1930 was designated on December 18, 1951, on the current route.

== FM 1931 ==
Farm to Market Road 1931
- Location: Jim Wells County
- Length: 2.275 mi (3.661 km)
- Existed: December 18, 1951–present

Farm to Market Road 1931 (FM 1931) is located in Jim Wells County. It runs from SH 44/SH 359 on the east side of Alice to FM 665. The road is known locally as Flournoy Road.

FM 1931 was designated on December 18, 1951, from US 59 (now SH 359), 2 miles (3.2 km) east of Alice, to Alice Airport. On December 17, 1952, the road was extended southeast 0.7 miles (1.1 km) to FM 736 (now FM 665). On October 21, 1981, a 1.4-mile (2.3 km) section was returned to Jim Wells County when FM 1931 was rerouted.

== FM 1932 ==
Farm to Market Road 1932
- Location: Donley County
- Length: 5.145 mi (8.280 km)
- Existed: December 18, 1951–present

Farm to Market Road 1932 (FM 1932) is located in Donley County. It runs from SH 203 in Hedley northward 5.1 miles (8.2 km) to FM 2471.

FM 1932 was designated on December 18, 1951, along the current route.

== FM 1933 ==
Farm to Market Road 1933
- Location: Loving County
- Length: 0.449 mi (723 m)
- Existed: December 18, 1951–present

Farm to Market Road 1933 (FM 1933) is located in Loving County. The entire route travels within the town of Mentone.

FM 1933 begins at an intersection with SH 302 at Pecos Street. The highway runs in a northwest direction along North Pecos Street for two blocks before turning northeast onto West Wheat Street. FM 1933 runs along West Wheat Street for a block, then turns southeast onto North Dallas Street, traveling for two blocks before ending back at an intersection with SH 302.

FM 1933 was designated in 1951 along its current route.

== FM 1934 ==
Farm to Market Road 1934
- Location: Reeves County
- Length: 3.854 mi (6.202 km)
- Existed: December 18, 1951–present

Farm to Market Road 1934 (FM 1934) is located in Reeves County. It runs from FM 869 to SH 17 southwest of Pecos.

FM 1934 begins at FM 869, approximately 3.2 miles (5.1 km) south of I-20, as a continuation of CR 211 to the west. It proceeds 3.9 miles (6.3 km) to the east and crosses the Pecos Valley Southern Railway before ending at SH 17, 7.0 miles (11.3 km) southwest of Pecos.

FM 1934 was designated on December 18, 1951, on the current route.

== FM 1935 ==
Farm to Market Road 1935
- Location: Washington County
- Length: 2.905 mi (4.675 km)
- Existed: October 21, 1959–present

Farm to Market Road 1935 (FM 1935) is located in Washington County. It runs from FM 390 near William Penn to Bluff Community.

FM 1935 was designated on October 21, 1959, on the current route.

=== FM 1935 (1951) ===
Farm to Market Road 1935
- Location: Hardin County
- Existed: November 20, 1951–December 17, 1952

The first use of the FM 1935 designation was in Hardin County, from FM 770 at Batson west 2.5 miles (4.0 km) to the Liberty County line. FM 1935 was cancelled on January 29, 1953, and transferred to FM 162 (now SH 105).

=== FM 1935 (1952) ===
Farm to Market Road 1935
- Location: Montague County
- Existed: December 17, 1952–February 2, 1959

The next use of the FM 1935 designation was in Montague County, from SH 59 in Bowie north 3.8 miles (6.1 km) to a road intersection. It was numbered on January 29, 1953, or later. On October 31, 1958, the road was extended north to FM 1806. FM 1935 was cancelled on February 2, 1959, and transferred to FM 1816.

== FM 1936 ==
Farm to Market Road 1936
- Location: Ector County
- Length: 14.356 mi (23.104 km)
- Existed: December 18, 1951–present

Farm to Market Road 1936 (FM 1936) is located in Ector County. It runs from SH 158 at Smith Chapel to I-20.

FM 1936 was designated on December 18, 1951, from SH 158 at Smith Chapel south to US 80 (now I-20), 2 miles (3.2 km) west of Odessa. On November 5, 1971, the road was extended southeast 5.0 miles (8.0 km) from US 80, but this extension was cancelled on July 31, 1975, as the county could not acquire right-of-way for it. On June 27, 1995, the section from SH 302 to I-20 was transferred to UR 1936, but was changed back to FM 1936 on November 15, 2018.

== FM 1937 ==
Farm to Market Road 1937
- Location: Bexar County
- Length: 6.776 mi (10.905 km)
- Existed: October 13, 1954–present

Farm to Market Road 1937 (FM 1937) is located in Bexar County. It runs from US 281 south of San Antonio southeast to Loop 1604.

FM 1937 was designated on October 13, 1954, from US 281 south of San Antonio south to Losoya. On September 21, 1955, the road was extended east and northeast to a point 2.5 miles (4.0 km) northeast of US 181. On November 21, 1956, the road was extended northeast 7.5 miles (12.1 km) to US 87 near Rock Springs School. On August 8, 1958, a 21.5-mile (34.6 km) section from Losoya east and northeast to US 87 was transferred to FM 1518 (now Loop 1604). On December 12, 1979, a spur connection in Losoya to Loop 1604 was added, replacing a former routing of Loop 1604. On December 30, 1988, the spur connection was redesignated as FM 3499.

=== FM 1937 (1951) ===
Farm to Market Road 1937
- Location: Parmer County
- Existed: December 18, 1951–May 25, 1954

A previous route numbered FM 1937 was designated on December 18, 1951, from US 84 in Farwell south and west 0.3 miles (0.48 km) to the Texas/New Mexico state line. FM 1937 was cancelled on May 25, 1954, and eliminated from the highway system.

== FM 1938 ==
Farm to Market Road 1938
- Location: Tarrant County
- Length: 7.514 mi (12.093 km)
- Existed: August 24, 1955–present

Farm to Market Road 1938 (FM 1938) is located in Tarrant County. It runs from FM 1709 to SH 121.

FM 1938 was designated on August 24, 1955, on the current route. On June 27, 1995, FM 1938 was transferred to UR 1938, but was changed back to FM 1938 on November 15, 2018.

=== FM 1938 (1952) ===
Farm to Market Road 1938
- Location: Hockley County
- Existed: January 18, 1952–November 1, 1954

A previous route numbered FM 1938 was designated on January 18, 1952, from FM 1490 at Oklahoma Flat west 9.0 miles (14.5 km) to what is now FM 303. FM 1938 was cancelled on November 1, 1954, and became a portion of FM 597.

== FM 1939 ==
Farm to Market Road 1939
- Location: Yoakum County
- Length: 12.050 mi (19.393 km)
- Existed: January 18, 1952–present

Farm to Market Road 1939 (FM 1939) is located in Yoakum County. It runs from SH 214 north of Denver City to FM 1780.

FM 1939 was designated on January 18, 1952, from SH 214, 1 mile (1.6 km) north of Denver City, east and south 15.2 miles (24.5 km) to the Gaines County line. A month later the road was extended 1.0 mile (1.6 km) south to SH 328 (now SH 83). On September 15, 1976, the section from FM 1544 to SH 83 (as well as FM 1544 itself) was transferred to FM 1780.

== FM 1940 ==
Farm to Market Road 1940
- Location: Robertson County
- Length: 13.825 mi (22.249 km)
- Existed: January 18, 1952–present

Farm to Market Road 1940 (FM 1940) is located in Robertson County. It runs from US 79 at New Baden to SH OSR.

FM 1941 was designated on January 18, 1952, from US 79 at New Baden southeast 5.0 miles (8.0 km) to a road intersection. Five months later the road was extended southeast 1.1 miles (1.8 km) to another road intersection. On October 31, 1958, the road was extended southeast 7.8 miles (12.6 km) to SH OSR. On September 5, 1973, a section from SH OSR to FM 974 was added, but was cancelled on January 22, 1976, by request of the Brazos County Court.

== FM 1941 ==
Farm to Market Road 1941
- Location: Chambers County
- Length: 13.577 mi (21.850 km)
- Existed: November 20, 1951–present

Farm to Market Road 1941 (FM 1941) is located in Chambers County. It runs from SH 65 to SH 124 at Sea Breeze.

FM 1941 was designated on November 20, 1951, from SH 124 at Sea Breeze to a point 4.5 miles (7.2 km) west. On December 17, 1952, the road was extended west and south 9.2 miles (14.8 km) to SH 73-T (now SH 65).

== FM 1942 ==
Farm to Market Road 1942
- Location: Harris and Chambers counties
- Length: 11.682 mi (18.800 km)
- Existed: November 20, 1951–present

Farm to Market Road 1942 (FM 1942) is located in Harris and Chambers counties. It runs from US 90 and FM 2100 at Barrett south and east to SH 146 at Mont Belvieu.

FM 1942 was designated on November 20, 1951, from SH 146 at Mont Belvieu west 3.2 miles (5.1 km) to the Harris County line. On October 31, 1958, the road was extended west 6.8 miles (10.9 km) to a county road. On November 24, 1959, the western terminus was relocated to Crosby/Lynchburg Road. On May 7, 1970, the road was extended north 0.5 miles (0.80 km) to US 90.

== FM 1943 ==
Farm to Market Road 1943
- Location: Tyler County
- Length: 23.655 mi (38.069 km)
- Existed: December 18, 1951–present

Farm to Market Road 1943 (FM 1943) is located in Tyler County. It runs from FM 92 near Mount Olive Church to intersection of CR 1700 and CR 1705.

FM 1943 was designated on December 18, 1951, from US 69 (now US 69/US 287) at Warren to a point 2.8 miles (4.5 km) east. On December 17, 1952, the road was extended east 1.0 mile (1.6 km) to a road intersection. Ten months later the road was extended 3.0 miles (4.8 km) west, creating a concurrency with US 69. On February 17, 1955, the road was extended 1.1 miles (1.8 km) west and 3.5 miles (5.6 km) east. Six months later the road was extended east and southeast 4.8 miles (7.7 km). On November 21, 1956, the road was extended southeast 4.0 miles (6.4 km) to FM 92. The road was extended west 3.0 miles (4.8 km) on September 20, 1961, and 0.5 miles (0.80 km) west on May 2, 1962.

== FM 1944 ==
Farm to Market Road 1944
- Location: San Patricio County
- Length: 9.392 mi (15.115 km)
- Existed: November 20, 1951–present

Farm to Market Road 1944 (FM 1944) is located in San Patricio County. It runs from US 77 northeast of Odem to FM 631 southwest of Taft.

FM 1944 was designated on November 20, 1951, on the current route.

== FM 1945 ==
Farm to Market Road 1945
- Location: San Patricio County
- Length: 4.240 mi (6.824 km)
- Existed: November 20, 1951–present

Farm to Market Road 1945 (FM 1945) is located in San Patricio County. It runs from US 77 southwest of Sinton to CR 2015.

FM 1945 was designated on November 20, 1951, on the current route.

== FM 1946 ==
Farm to Market Road 1946
- Location: Hill and Navarro counties
- Length: 13.330 mi (21.453 km)
- Existed: January 18, 1952–present

Farm to Market Road 1946 (FM 1946) is located in Hill and Navarro counties. It runs from SH 171 in Bynum to FM 744.

FM 1946 was designated on January 18, 1952, from SH 171 in Bynum to a point 4.0 miles (6.4 km) east. Eleven months later the road was extended 5.9 miles (9.5 km) east to FM 308 at Irene. On April 22, 1958, the road was extended west 0.2 miles (0.32 km), replacing Spur 192. On June 2, 1967, the road was extended southeast 3.2 miles (5.1 km) to the Navarro County line. On July 11, 1968, the road was extended another 1.3 miles (2.1 km) east and southeast to FM 744. On July 31, 1996, a 0.2-mile (0.32 km) section (the former Spur 192) from SH 171 to CR 256 was removed and returned to Bynum.

== FM 1947 ==
Farm to Market Road 1947
- Location: Hill County
- Length: 5.623 mi (9.049 km)
- Existed: January 18, 1952–present

Farm to Market Road 1947 (FM 1947) is located in Hill County. It runs from SH 22 at Peoria to FM 310 at Vaughan with a spur connection to Aquilla Lake.

FM 1947 was designated on January 18, 1952, on the current route; the spur was added on February 10, 1980.

== FM 1948 ==
Farm to Market Road 1948
- Location: Washington County
- Length: 13.647 mi (21.963 km)
- Existed: August 24, 1955–present

Farm to Market Road 1948 (FM 1948) is located in Washington County. It runs from SH 36 south of Yegua Creek to US 290 west of Brenham.

FM 1948 was designated on August 24, 1955, from US 290, 9 miles (14 km) west of Brenham, northwest to FM 390, 2.5 miles (4.0 km) northeast of Burton. On October 31, 1958, the road was extended 3.0 miles (4.8 km) northwest from FM 390, creating a concurrency with FM 390. On November 26, 1969, the road was extended north and east 4.0 miles (6.4 km). On December 19 of that year the road was extended 4.8 miles (7.7 km) to SH 36, replacing FM 3092.

=== FM 1948 (1952) ===
Farm to Market Road 1948
- Location: Hill County
- Existed: January 18, 1952–October 18, 1954

A previous route numbered FM 1948 was designated on January 18, 1952, from SH 171 at Oceola, southwest 5.1 miles (8.2 km) to a road intersection. On December 17 of that year the road was extended southwest 5.9 miles (9.5 km) to FM 933. FM 1948 was cancelled on October 18, 1954, and became a portion of FM 934, but signage was not changed until February 15, 1955.

== FM 1949 ==
Farm to Market Road 1949
- Location: Wilbarger County
- Length: 3.938 mi (6.338 km)
- Existed: August 24, 1955–present

Farm to Market Road 1949 (FM 1949) is located in Wilbarger County. It runs from US 70/US 287 to FM 433.

FM 1949 was designated on August 24, 1955, from US 287 at Paradise Creek to a county road (now FM 433). On June 2, 1967, the road was extended north 0.3 miles (0.48 km) from US 183 (former US 287) to US 287 and a break was added at Loop 488 (now Bus. US 287).

=== FM 1949 (1951) ===
Farm to Market Road 1949
- Location: Houston County
- Existed: November 20, 1951–November 15, 1954

A previous route numbered FM 1949 was designated on November 20, 1951, from SH 7 at Ratcliff northwest 3.6 miles (5.8 km) to Tadmor. On December 17, 1952, the road was extended northwest 4.4 miles (7.1 km) to a road intersection. On October 26, 1953, the road was extended 3.5 miles (5.6 km) northwest to SH 21. FM 1949 was cancelled on November 15, 1954, and became a portion of FM 227.

== FM 1950 ==
Farm to Market Road 1950
- Location: Falls County
- Length: 7.558 mi (12.163 km)
- Existed: November 20, 1951–present

Farm to Market Road 1950 (FM 1950) is located in Falls County. It runs from FM 1239 to US 77 west of Chilton.

FM 1950 was designated on November 20, 1951, from FM 1239 northeast via Sego to US 77 (later FM 107, now Bus. SH 7) in Chilton. On April 29, 1959, a 0.6-mile (0.97 km) section from new US 77 west of Chilton to old US 77 in Chilton was removed from the highway system due to rerouting of US 77 and SH 7. This section is now CR 4023.

== FM 1951 ==
Farm to Market Road 1951
- Location: Limestone County
- Length: 3.403 mi (5.477 km)
- Existed: January 18, 1952–present

Farm to Market Road 1951 (FM 1951) is located in Limestone County. It runs from SH 171 in Coolidge to the intersection of LCR 205 and LCR 198.

FM 1951 was designated on January 18, 1952, from SH 171 in Coolidge to Datura. On October 3, 1966, the road was extended north 0.13 miles (0.21 km) to new SH 171.

== FM 1952 ==
Farm to Market Road 1952
- Location: Austin and Fort Bend counties
- Length: 9.544 mi (15.360 km)
- Existed: April 24, 1953–present

Farm to Market Road 1952 (FM 1952) is located in Austin and Fort Bend counties. It runs from SH 36 at Wallis to US 90 Alt. at Tavener.

FM 1952 was designated on April 24, 1953, from SH 36 at Wallis 1.8 miles (2.9 km) to the Fort Bend County line. On September 21, 1955, the road was extended 8.0 miles (12.9 km) south, east and south to US 90 Alt.

=== FM 1952 (1952) ===
Farm to Market Road 1952
- Location: Limestone County
- Existed: January 18, 1952–April 7, 1953

A previous route numbered FM 1952 was designated on January 18, 1952, from FM 39, 1 mile (1.6 km) southeast of Farrar, south 4.2 miles (6.8 km) to the Leon County line. FM 1952 was cancelled on April 7, 1953, and transferred to FM 1512.

== FM 1953 ==
Farm to Market Road 1953
- Location: Limestone County
- Length: 6.173 mi (9.934 km)
- Existed: January 18, 1952–present

Farm to Market Road 1953 (FM 1953) is located in Limestone County. It runs from FM 39 at Fallon to SH 164.

FM 1953 was designated on January 18, 1952, from SH 164 near Center 5.1 miles (8.2 km) to Prairie Grove. On January 23, 1953, the road was extended 1.4 miles (2.3 km) miles north to FM 39.

== FM 1954 ==
Farm to Market Road 1954
- Location: Archer and Clay counties
- Length: 23.203 mi (37.342 km)
- Existed: February 20, 1952–present

== FM 1955 ==
Farm to Market Road 1955
- Location: McCulloch County
- Length: 0.784 mi (1,262 m)
- Existed: March 26, 1953–present

=== FM 1955 (1952) ===
Farm to Market Road 1955
- Location: Archer County
- Existed: February 20, 1952–February 6, 1953

A previous route numbered FM 1955 was designated on February 20, 1952, from SH 25 2.7 miles (4.3 km) to Lake Kickapoo Dam. FM 1955 was cancelled on February 6, 1953, and transferred to FM 368.

== FM 1956 ==
Farm to Market Road 1956
- Location: Montague County
- Length: 12.911 mi (20.778 km)
- Existed: August 4, 1955–present

Farm to Market Road 1956 (FM 1956) is located in Montague County. The route runs approximately 13 miles (21 km) from FM 103 in Nocona to FM 677 at Capps Corner. FM 1956 also intersects FM 3301 and FM 1815.

FM 1956 was designated on August 24, 1955, from FM 103 east 2.1 miles (3.4 km). On October 31, 1957, it was extended east to FM 1815. On October 31, 1958, the route was extended to its current eastern terminus.

=== FM 1956 (1951) ===
Farm to Market Road 1956
- Location: Deaf Smith County
- Existed: December 18, 1951–October 18, 1954

A previous route numbered FM 1956 was designated in Deaf Smith County on December 18, 1951, from FM 1412, 14 miles (23 km) west of SH 51 (now US 385), north 5.3 miles (8.5 km) to a road intersection. FM 1956 was cancelled on October 18, 1954, and became a portion of FM 290 (now SH 214).

== FM 1957 ==
Farm to Market Road 1957
- Location: Medina and Bexar counties
- Length: 15.983 mi (25.722 km)
- Existed: December 1, 1954–present

Farm to Market Road 1957 (FM 1957) is located in Medina and Bexar counties. The 16-mile-long (26 km) highway serves as an arterial street through the growing western suburbs of San Antonio. FM 1957 is known as Potranco Road within Bexar County.

FM 1957 was designated on October 13, 1954, from FM 471 southeast and southwest 13.8 miles (22.2 km) to the Bexar–Medina county line. On November 21, 1956, a 0.1 miles (0.16 km) spur connection to Loop 13 was added. On October 31, 1957, FM 1957 was extended west 5.3 miles (8.5 km) to FM 471 near Rio Medina. On December 30, 1988, the segment of Culebra Road between Grissom Road (FM 471) and I-410 was transferred to FM 3487 (which was decommissioned in 2014 as part of TxDOT's San Antonio turnback plan). On June 27, 1995, the section from Loop 1604 to UR 3487 was transferred to Urban Road 1957 (UR 1957). The designation of this section reverted to FM 1957 with the elimination of the Urban Road system on November 15, 2018. The section of FM 1957 east of Loop 1604 was proposed for decommissioning in 2014 as part of TxDOT's San Antonio turnback proposal, which would have turned back over 129 miles of roads to the city of San Antonio, but the city of San Antonio rejected that proposal.

=== FM 1957 (1951) ===
Farm to Market Road 1957
- Location: Borden County
- Existed: November 20, 1951–September 30, 1954

A previous route numbered FM 1957 was designated on November 20, 1951, from US 180 east of Gail, south 8.5 miles (13.7 km) to Union School. FM 1957 was canceled on September 30, 1954, and became a portion of FM 1610.

== FM 1958 ==
Farm to Market Road 1958
- Location: Floyd County
- Length: 20.937 mi (33.695 km)
- Existed: October 31, 1958–present

=== FM 1958 (1951) ===
Farm to Market Road 1958
- Location: Borden County
- Existed: November 20, 1951–January 27, 1953

A previous route numbered FM 1958 was designated on November 20, 1951, from US 180 east of Gail north and east 14.5 miles (23.3 km) to the Borden–Scurry county line near Fluvanna. FM 1958 was cancelled on January 27, 1953, and transferred to FM 612.

== FM 1959 ==
Farm to Market Road 1959
- Location: Harris County
- Length: 1.339 mi (2.155 km)
- Existed: March 28, 1952–present

Farm to Market Road 1959 (FM 1959) is located in southeast Harris County within the Houston–Sugar Land–Baytown metropolitan area. It is known locally as Dixie Farm Road and is 1.3 miles (2.1 km) in length. It runs from I-45 to the entrance to Ellington Field on SH 3 to the northeast.

FM 1959 was designated on March 28, 1952, to run from US 75 (now SH 3) to Ellington Field, on its current alignment. The route was redesignated Urban Road 1959 (UR 1959) in 1995. The designation reverted to FM 1959 with the elimination of the Urban Road system on November 15, 2018.

== FM 1960 ==
Farm to Market Road 1960
- Location: Harris and Liberty counties
- Length: 46.946 mi (75.552 km)
- Existed: May 23, 1951–present

Farm to Market Road 1960 (FM 1960) is located in Harris and Liberty counties. It runs from US 290 near Satsuma to SH 321 in Dayton.

FM 1960 was designated on May 23, 1951, from US 290 near Satsuma northeast 11.4 miles (18.3 km) to Kuykendahl Road at Bammel. On December 17, 1952, the road was extended 19.7 miles (31.7 km) east to a point 6.6 miles (10.6 km) east of what is now I-69/US 59. On September 29, 1954, a 15.0-mile (24.1 km) section from US 90 near Katy northeast to Satsuma was added. On September 15, 1955, the southwestern terminus was relocated to US 90 at Addicks. On November 21, 1956, the road was extended 17.1 miles (27.5 km) east to SH 321 in Dayton, replacing a section of FM 1008. On September 26, 1960, the road was extended 3.4 miles (5.5 km) south to FM 1093, and another 8.6 miles (13.8 km) south to US 59 on September 25, 1962. On November 1, 1968, a 21.5-mile (34.6 km) section from US 59 to US 290 was transferred to SH 6. On November 20, 1985, a 0.258-mile (0.415 km) section from old US 290 north to new US 290 was also transferred to SH 6. On June 30, 1995, the section from US 290 to FM 2100 was redesignated Urban Road 1960 (UR 1960). The designation of this section reverted to FM 1960 with the elimination of the Urban Road system on November 15, 2018.

== FM 1961 ==
Farm to Market Road 1961
- Location: Goliad County
- Length: 13.387 mi (21.544 km)
- Existed: March 26, 1952–present

== FM 1962 ==
Farm to Market Road 1962
- Location: McMullen County
- Length: 9.168 mi (14.754 km)
- Existed: September 21, 1955 (Note: FM 1962 was originally designated as RM 1962 from 1955 to 1976.)–present

Farm to Market Road 1962 (FM 1962) is located in McMullen County. It runs from SH 16 to CR 144.

FM 1962 was designated on September 21, 1955, as Ranch to Market Road 1962 (RM 1962), from SH 173 (now SH 16), 16 miles (26 km) south of Tilden, to a point 4.6 miles (7.4 km) east. On May 25, 1976, the designation was changed to FM 1962, and the route was extended southeast 4.5 miles (7.2 km).

=== FM 1962 (1952) ===
Farm to Market Road 1962
- Location: Sutton County
- Existed: March 20, 1952–August 24, 1955

A previous route numbered FM 1962 was designated on March 20, 1952, from US 290, 3.9 miles (6.3 km) east of Sonora, to a point 9.7 miles (15.6 km) northeast. The road was extended 3.5 miles (5.6 km) northeast on February 24, 1953, another 3.0 miles (4.8 km) on October 29 of that year, another 3.0 miles (4.8 km) on June 30, 1954, and another 6.6 miles (10.6 km) to the Schleicher County line on October 26 of that year. On August 24, 1955, FM 1962 was cancelled and transferred to FM 864 (now RM 864).

== FM 1963 ==
Farm to Market Road 1963
- Location: Falls and Milam counties
- Length: 6.839 mi (11.006 km)
- Existed: August 21, 1952–present

== RM 1964 ==
Ranch to Market Road 1964
- Location: Crockett County
- Length: 4.541 mi (7.308 km)
- Existed: September 25, 1952 (Note: RM 1964 was originally designated as FM 1964 from 1952 to 1959.)–March 30, 2023

Ranch to Market Road 1964 (RM 1964) was located in Crockett County. It ran from SH 137 (former FM/RM 865) to Todd Oil Field near the intersection of CR 301 and CR 302.

RM 1964 was designated on September 25, 1952, as Farm to Market Road 1964 (FM 1964). The designation was changed to RM 1964 on November 13, 1959.

The road, along with RM 1973, was removed from the state highway system and given to Crockett County on March 30, 2023, to cover construction costs for the I-10 eastbound exit 365 project, which has been completed.

== FM 1965 ==
Farm to Market Road 1965
- Location: Fayette County
- Length: 2.974 mi (4.786 km)
- Existed: May 2, 1962–present

=== FM 1965 (1952) ===
Farm to Market Road 1965
- Location: Sabine County
- Existed: October 21, 1952–May 15, 1961

A previous route numbered FM 1965 was designated on October 21, 1952, from SH 87 in Hemphill east 5.1 miles (8.2 km) to a road intersection. FM 1965 was cancelled on May 15, 1961, and transferred to FM 83.

== FM 1966 ==
Farm to Market Road 1966
- Location: Caldwell County
- Length: 4.084 mi (6.573 km)
- Existed: November 19, 1952–present

== FM 1967 ==
Farm to Market Road 1967
- Location: Andrews County
- Length: 14.612 mi (23.516 km)
- Existed: December 17, 1952–present

== FM 1968 ==
Farm to Market Road 1968
- Location: Harrison and Marion counties
- Length: 4.932 mi (7.937 km)
- Existed: December 17, 1952–present

== FM 1969 ==
Farm to Market Road 1969
- Location: Marion County
- Length: 3.586 mi (5.771 km)
- Existed: December 17, 1952–present

== FM 1970 ==
Farm to Market Road 1970
- Location: Shelby and Panola counties
- Length: 21.372 mi (34.395 km)
- Existed: December 17, 1952–present

Farm to Market Road 1970 is a 21.372-mile (34.395 km) state road in Shelby and Panola counties that connects the east end of Shelby County Road 4760 and the south end of Shelby County Road 4810 (west of Timpson) with U.S. Route 79 in Delray.

== FM 1971 ==
Farm to Market Road 1971
- Location: Rusk and Panola counties
- Length: 17.541 mi (28.230 km)
- Existed: December 17, 1952–present

Farm to Market Road 1971 is a 17.541-mile (28.230 km) state road in Rusk and Panola counties that connects Farm to Market Road 95 (southeast of Arlam) with Texas State Highway 315 (southwest of Clayton).

== FM 1972 ==
Farm to Market Road 1972
- Location: Upshur County
- Length: 2.769 mi (4.456 km)
- Existed: December 17, 1952–present

Farm to Market Road 1972 (FM 1972) is located in Upshur County. It runs from FM 1649 to FM 726.

FM 1972 was designated on December 17, 1952, from FM 1649 to SH 26 (now US 259) at Old Diana. On September 18, 1962, a 0.5-mile (0.80 km) section from a then-junction with FM 1973 to SH 26 was transferred to FM 1973 (now FM 726).

== RM 1973 ==
Farm to Market Road 1973 (FM 1973) and Ranch to Market Road 1973 (RM 1973) are designations for two former routes. No highway currently uses the FM 1973 or RM 1973 designation.

=== FM 1973 (1952) ===
Farm to Market Road 1973
- Location: Upshur County
- Existed: December 17, 1952–September 18, 1963

FM 1973 was designated in Upshur County on December 17, 1952, from FM 1650 northeast to SH 154. On October 29, 1953, the road was extended south 3.4 miles (5.5 km) to FM 1403 (now SH 300) at Glenwood, creating a concurrency with FM 1650. On December 3, 1957, the road was extended southwest to US 271 and northeast to FM 1972, creating a concurrency with SH 154. On September 18, 1962, the designation was extended east 0.5 miles (0.8 km) to SH 26, replacing a section of FM 1972. FM 1973 was cancelled on June 28, 1963, and transferred to FM 726.

=== RM 1973 (1964) ===
Ranch to Market Road 1973
- Location: Crockett County
- Length: 16.727 mi (26.919 km)
- Existed: May 6, 1964–March 30, 2023

RM 1973 was designated in Crockett County on May 6, 1964, to run from SH 163 southwest 5.0 miles (8.0 km). The road was extended southwest 5.0 miles (8.0 km) on January 5, 1971. On October 26, 1983, the designation was extended southwest 18.4 miles (29.6 km) to RM 1024. On June 30, 1987, the 11.2-mile (18.0 km) section from the Crockett–Val Verde county line to RM 1024 was cancelled; this section was never built.

The road was given to Crockett County, along with RM 1964, on March 30, 2023, to cover the construction costs for the I-10 eastbound exit 365 project, which has been completed.

== FM 1974 ==
Farm to Market Road 1974
- Location: Young County
- Length: 8.847 mi (14.238 km)
- Existed: August 24, 1955–present

=== FM 1974 (1952) ===
Farm to Market Road 1974
- Location: Hunt County
- Existed: December 17, 1952–November 29, 1954

A previous route numbered FM 1974 was designated on December 17, 1952, from FM 513 east to the Rains County line. At 0.1 miles (0.16 km), this FM 1974 was one of the shortest Farm to Market Roads. On October 26, 1954, the road was extended south 0.3 miles (0.48 km) to FM 2102. FM 1974 was cancelled on November 29, 1954, and became a portion of FM 513; at the same time, FM 2102 was cancelled and became a portion of FM 35.

== FM 1975 ==
Farm to Market Road 1975
- Location: Upshur and Camp counties
- Length: 7.579 mi (12.197 km)
- Existed: December 17, 1952–present

== FM 1976 ==
Farm to Market Road 1976
- Location: Bexar County
- Length: 7.151 mi (11.508 km)
- Existed: December 17, 1952–present

Farm to Market Road 1976 (FM 1976) is located in Bexar County.

FM 1976 begins at a junction with I-35 / I-410 near Windcrest. The highway travels in an eastern direction along Walzem Road along the southern boundary of Windcrest, then turns south at an intersection with Eagle Crest Boulevard and Montgomery Drive, before turning southeast at Eisenhaur Road and Woodlake Parkway. FM 1976 turns northeast at Gibbs Sprawl Road, then travels through Converse, intersecting FM 1516. The highway enters Universal City, where it ends at a junction with Loop 1604.

FM 1976 was designated on December 17, 1952, running from US 81 near Fratt eastward to SPRR at a distance of 3.3 miles (5.3 km). The highway was extended 2.5 miles (4.0 km) eastward to FM 78 near Converse on December 2, 1953. FM 1976 was extended 0.4 miles (0.64 km) eastward on March 24, 1963, in FM 78 was rerouted. The highway was rerouted to Loop 1604 on May 22, 1979, replacing FM 3375, while the old route was designated as a spur of FM 1976. On December 20, 1988, the spur was redesignated as FM 3502, which has since been decommissioned. On June 27, 1995, the route was redesignated Urban Road 1976 (UR 1976). The designation reverted to FM 1976 with the elimination of the Urban Road system on November 15, 2018.

== FM 1977 ==
Farm to Market Road 1977
- Location: Guadalupe and Caldwell counties
- Length: 2.852 mi (4.590 km)
- Existed: December 17, 1952–present

== FM 1978 ==
Farm to Market Road 1978
- Location: Guadalupe County
- Length: 3.761 mi (6.053 km)
- Existed: December 17, 1952–present

== FM 1979 ==
Farm to Market Road 1979
- Location: Guadalupe County
- Length: 7.978 mi (12.839 km)
- Existed: December 17, 1952–present

== FM 1980 ==
Farm to Market Road 1980
- Location: Burnet County
- Length: 3.696 mi (5.948 km)
- Existed: April 25, 1978–present

=== FM 1980 (1952) ===
Farm to Market Road 1980
- Location: Bexar County
- Length: 3.696 mi (5.948 km)
- Existed: December 17, 1952–October 27, 1954

The first use of the FM 1980 designation was in Bexar County, from FM 1516 near Martinez east 4.0 miles (6.4 km) to a road intersection. On October 28, 1953, the road was extended west 4.4 miles (7.1 km) to Loop 13. FM 1980 was cancelled on October 27, 1954, and became a portion of FM 1346.

=== FM 1980 (1955) ===
Farm to Market Road 1980
- Location: Freestone County
- Existed: August 24, 1955–December 10, 1956

The second use of the FM 1980 designation was in Freestone County, from US 84, 2 miles (3.2 km) northwest of Butler south 4.8 miles (7.7 km) to near Keechi Creek. On November 21, 1956, the road was extended 6.5 miles (10.5 km) to FM 489 at Lanely. FM 1980 was cancelled on December 10, 1956, and transferred to FM 489.

=== RM 1980 (1957) ===
Ranch to Market Road 1980
- Location: Crockett and Pecos counties
- Length: 3.696 mi (5.948 km)
- Existed: September 27, 1957–June 30, 1977

The third use of the FM 1980 designation was in Crockett and Pecos counties as RM 1980, from RM 33 (now SH 137) west 28.8 miles (46.3 km) to the Pecos River. On September 27, 1960, the road was extended west 1.1 miles (1.8 km) to SH 349 at Iraan. By 1966, the road was signed, but not designated, as part of SH 29. FM 1980 was cancelled on June 30, 1977, and redesignated as US 190.

== FM 1981 ==
Farm to Market Road 1981
- Location: Collingsworth County
- Length: 11.776 mi (18.952 km)
- Existed: August 24, 1955–present

=== FM 1981 (1952) ===
Farm to Market Road 1981
- Location: Guadalupe County
- Existed: December 17, 1952–October 21, 1954

A previous route numbered FM 1981 was designated on December 17, 1952, from FM 621 (now FM 20), 3 miles (4.8 km) southeast of Staples, northeast to the San Marcos River. FM 1981 was cancelled on October 21, 1954, and became a portion of FM 964 (now FM 20).

== FM 1982 ==
Farm to Market Road 1982
- Location: Mitchell and Nolan counties
- Length: 12.799 mi (20.598 km)
- Existed: December 17, 1952–present

== FM 1983 ==
Farm to Market Road 1983
- Location: Mitchell County
- Length: 1.239 mi (1.994 km)
- Existed: December 17, 1952–present

== FM 1984 ==
Farm to Market Road 1984
- Location: Caldwell County
- Length: 4.022 mi (6.473 km)
- Existed: December 17, 1952–present

== FM 1985 ==
Farm to Market Road 1985
- Location: Chambers County
- Length: 14.796 mi (23.812 km)
- Existed: October 28, 1953–present

=== FM 1985 (1952) ===
Farm to Market Road 1985
- Location: Lee County
- Existed: December 17, 1952–October 28, 1953

A previous route numbered FM 1985 was designated on December 17, 1952, from US 290 in Giddings northeast 7.0 miles (11.3 km) towards Dime Box. Ten months later FM 1985 was cancelled and transferred to FM 141.

== FM 1986 ==
Farm to Market Road 1986
- Location: Zavala County
- Length: 6.477 mi (10.424 km)
- Existed: December 4, 1957–present

=== FM 1986 (1952) ===
Farm to Market Road 1986
- Location: Kent County
- Existed: December 17, 1952–September 30, 1954

The first use of the FM 1986 designation was in Kent County, from SH 70 in Jayton to a point 4.7 miles (7.6 km) west. FM 1986 was cancelled on September 30, 1954, and became a portion of FM 1228.

=== RM 1986 (1954) ===
Ranch to Market Road 1986
- Location: Briscoe County
- Existed: November 30, 1954–January 19, 1956

The next use of the FM 1986 designation was in Briscoe County as Ranch to Market Road 1986 (RM 1986), from SH 256, 7 miles (11 km) east of SH 86, south to the Haynes Boy Scout camp. RM 1986 was cancelled on January 19, 1956, and returned to Briscoe County, but this was not effective until construction was completed. This was revived on March 21, 1963, as FM 2167 (but that was cancelled on October 27, 1994, as TxDOT could no longer maintain the road).

=== FM 1986 (1956) ===
Farm to Market Road 1986
- Location: Hutchinson County
- Existed: December 12, 1956–October 31, 1957

The third use of the FM 1986 designation was in Hutchinson County, from the end of Spur 119 to a point 1.8 miles (2.9 km) north. FM 1986 was cancelled and removed from the highway system ten months later in lieu of designation of FM 1319 (now RM 1319).

== FM 1987 ==
Farm to Market Road 1987
- Location: Polk County
- Length: 10.189 mi (16.398 km)
- Existed: December 17, 1952–present

== FM 1988 ==
Farm to Market Road 1988
- Location: Polk County
- Length: 14.908 mi (23.992 km)
- Existed: December 17, 1952–present

== RM 1989 ==
Ranch to Market Road 1989
- Location: Sutton County
- Length: 9.730 mi (15.659 km)
- Existed: August 24, 1955–present

=== FM 1989 (1952) ===
Farm to Market Road 1989
- Location: Anderson County
- Existed: December 17, 1952–December 10, 1954

Farm to Market Road 1989 (FM 1989) was designated on December 17, 1952, from FM 860 near Blackfoot, northward and eastward 5.6 miles (9.0 km) to SH 19 at Bradford. On October 26, 1954, the road was extended 11.9 miles (19.2 km) east to FM 315 at Brushy Creek. FM 1989 was cancelled two months later and became a portion of FM 837.

== FM 1990 ==
Farm to Market Road 1990
- Location: Anderson County
- Length: 7.734 mi (12.447 km)
- Existed: December 17, 1952–present

Farm to Market Road 1990 (FM 1990) is located in Anderson County. It runs from US 79/US 84 southwest of Palestine to SH 294 with a spur connection to Old Fort Houston.

FM 1990 was designated on December 17, 1952, on the current route; the spur connection was formerly a portion of Spur 89.

== FM 1991 ==
Farm to Market Road 1991
- Location: Bosque County
- Length: 11.140 mi (17.928 km)
- Existed: December 17, 1952–present

Farm to Market Road 1991 is a 11.140-mile (17.928 km) state road in Bosque County that connects Farm to Market Road 219 (east of Clifton) with Texas State Highway 22 in Meridian.

== FM 1992 ==
Farm to Market Road 1992
- Location: San Augustine County
- Length: 5.268 mi (8.478 km)
- Existed: May 2, 1962–present

Farm to Market Road 1992 (FM 1992) is located in San Augustine County. It runs from SH 147 near Macune, west and south to SH 103.

FM 1992 was designated on May 2, 1962, from SH 147, 1 mile (1.6 km) north of Macune, to a point 1 mile (1.6 km) westward. On June 2, 1967, it was extended to SH 103, replacing FM 2786.

=== FM 1992 (1952) ===
Farm to Market Road 1992
- Location: Somervell and Bosque counties
- Existed: December 17, 1952–December 23, 1959

A previous route numbered FM 1992 was designated on December 17, 1952, from former SH 174 at Eulogy northwest to FM 202. On July 28, 1955, the road was extended northeast to Brazos Point. FM 1992 was cancelled on December 23, 1959, and transferred to FM 56.

== FM 1993 ==
Farm to Market Road 1993
- Location: Titus County
- Length: 6.336 mi (10.197 km)
- Existed: December 17, 1952–present

== FM 1994 ==
Farm to Market Road 1994
- Location: Fort Bend County
- Length: 7.729 mi (12.439 km)
- Existed: December 17, 1952–present

Farm to Market Road 1994 (FM 1994) is located in Fort Bend County. It runs from FM 762 at Brazos Lakes to SH 36 at Guy. The route has a brief concurrency with FM 361 in Long Point.

FM 1994 was designated on December 17, 1952, from SH 36 at Guy northeast to FM 361. On September 29, 1954, the designation was extended to FM 762, creating the concurrency with FM 361.

== FM 1995 ==
Farm to Market Road 1995
- Location: Van Zandt and Smith counties
- Length: 11.236 mi (18.083 km)
- Existed: December 17, 1952–present

== FM 1996 ==
Farm to Market Road 1996
- Location: Coryell County
- Length: 4.506 mi (7.252 km)
- Existed: October 31, 1958–present

=== FM 1996 (1952) ===
Farm to Market Road 1996
- Location: Bowie County
- Existed: December 17, 1952–March 13, 1958

A previous route numbered FM 1996 was designated on December 17, 1952, from SH 26 east via Dolby Springs to FM 561 west of Siloam. FM 1996 was cancelled on March 15, 1958, and transferred to FM 561.

== FM 1997 ==
Farm to Market Road 1997
- Location: Harrison County
- Length: 12.383 mi (19.929 km)
- Existed: December 17, 1952–present

== FM 1998 ==
Farm to Market Road 1998
- Location: Harrison County
- Length: 10.717 mi (17.247 km)
- Existed: December 17, 1952–present

Farm to Market Road 1998 (FM 1998) is a 10.7-mile-long (17.2 km) road that is located in Harrison County. The road begins at US 80 in downtown Marshall and turns northeast eventually ending at FM 134 east of Scottsville. FM 1998 was designated on December 17, 1952, along its current route.

Junction list

The entire route is in Harrison County.

Location	mi	km	Destinations	Notes
Marshall	0.0	0.0	US 80 (Victory Drive) – Shreveport	Western terminus
Marshall	1.2	1.9	Loop 390 (Future I-369)	
Scottsville	4.8	7.7	FM 2199 south	Northern terminus of FM 2199; southern terminus of Harkins Lane
	10.7	17.2	FM 134 – Jonesville, Waskom, Karnack	Eastern terminus
1.000 mi = 1.609 km; 1.000 km = 0.621 mi

== FM 1999 ==
Farm to Market Road 1999
- Location: Harrison County
- Length: 5.412 mi (8.710 km)
- Existed: December 17, 1952–present
