= Texas State Highway Spur 371 =

State highway in Texas

State Highway Spur 371
- General Hudnell Drive

Route information
- Maintained by TxDOT
- Length: 1.778 mi (2.861 km)
- Existed: 1962–present

Major junctions
- South end: Billy Mitchell Drive in Kelly Field Annex
- North end: US 90 in San Antonio

Location
- Country: United States
- State: Texas

Highway system
- Highways in Texas; Interstate; US; State; Former; Toll; Loops; Spurs; FM/RM; Park; Rec
← Loop 370	→ Loop 372

Spur 371 is a 1.778-mile (2.861 km) limited-access spur route in the U.S. state of Texas in San Antonio. Spur 371 follows General Hudnell Drive from the former Kelly Air Force Base to U.S. Highway 90 (US 90) southwest of Downtown San Antonio. The highway provides access to the Kelly USA industrial park.

== Route description ==
Spur 371 begins at Billy Mitchell Boulevard at the former boundary of Kelly Air Force Base and heads towards the northeast as a limited-access highway. The highway's northern terminus at US 90 only facilitates traffic from northbound Spur 371 to eastbound US 90 and from westbound US 90 to southbound Spur 371.

== History ==
Spur 371 was designated on September 25, 1962, to provide access to Kelly Field from US 90 on the southwest side of San Antonio.

The highway is named after Major General William Thomas Hudnell (1908–1986), who served as commander of the San Antonio Air Materiel Area (later the San Antonio Air Logistics Center) at the former Kelly Air Force Base, from 1960 to 1965.

== Exit list ==
The entire route is in San Antonio, Bexar County. All exits are unnumbered.

mi	km	Destinations	Notes
0.0	0.0	Billy Mitchell Boulevard	Southern terminus; at-grade intersection
0.3	0.48	Cupples Road to Quintana Road	Northbound exit and southbound entrance
0.7	1.1	Frio City Road	Northbound exit and southbound entrance
1.0	1.6	Quintana Road – Kelly Field Annex	Southbound exit and northbound entrance
1.778	2.861	US 90 east	Northern terminus; no access to westbound US 90 nor from eastbound US 90
1.000 mi = 1.609 km; 1.000 km = 0.621 mi: Incomplete access
