= Texas State Highway Loop 79 =

State highway in Texas

State Highway Loop 79
- Judge Mike L. Fernandez Loop

Route information
- Maintained by TxDOT
- Length: 12.00 mi (19.31 km)
- Existed: April 2012–present

Major junctions
- South end: US 277 southeast of Del Rio
- US 90 in Del Rio; US 277 / US 377 north of Del Rio
- North end: US 90 north of Del Rio

Location
- Country: United States
- State: Texas
- Counties: Val Verde

Highway system
- Highways in Texas; Interstate; US; State; Former; Toll; Loops; Spurs; FM/RM; Park; Rec
← Spur 78	→ Spur 80

Texas State Highway Loop 79 (Loop 79) is a state highway loop in Val Verde County in the U.S. state of Texas. The highway, which opened in 2012, serves as a bypass of Del Rio, and provides access to Laughlin Air Force Base near its southern terminus.

== Route description ==
Loop 79 begins at an intersection with US 277 southeast of Del Rio. The roadway travels to the north past the western edge of Laughlin Air Force Base; an interchange with Spur 317, whose designation was extended to connect to the then-proposed Loop 79 in 2008, provides access to the military facility. Loop 79 then briefly enters Del Rio city limits, where it has an interchange with US 90, before curving to the northwest and intersecting RM 2523, known locally as Hamilton Lane. The route then travels through sparsely populated Val Verde County before turning to the west, crossing US 277 / US 377 at an interchange before reaching its northern terminus at an intersection with US 90.

== History ==
A route numbered Loop 79 was originally designated on September 25, 1939, and served as a loop in Stinnett. That designation was cancelled on June 21, 1990, when that roadway became a business route of SH 152.

The present Loop 79 was designated by TxDOT on June 26, 2008. Construction on the route began in March 2010 and the roadway opened to traffic in April 2012. Loop 79 is classified as a super-2 highway, with interchanges at US 277 / US 377 in the north, US 90 in the east, and at the access road to Laughlin Air Force Base.

== Major intersections ==
The entire highway is in Val Verde County.

Location	mi	km	Destinations	Notes
	0.0	0.0	US 277 – Eagle Pass, Del Rio, Laredo	Southern terminus
	1.1	1.8	Spur 317 – Laughlin Air Force Base	Interchange
Del Rio	2.9	4.7	US 90 – Del Rio, Brackettville	Interchange
	4.2	6.8	RM 2523 – Del Rio, Carta Valley	
	11.5	18.5	US 277 / US 377 – Sonora, Del Rio	Interchange
	12.0	19.3	US 90 – Del Rio, Comstock	Northern terminus
1.000 mi = 1.609 km; 1.000 km = 0.621 mi
