= Farm to Market Road 471 =

State road in Texas, United States

Farm to Market Road 471

Route information
- Maintained by TxDOT
- Length: 40.8 mi (65.7 km)
- Existed: May 23, 1951–present

Major junctions
- South end: I-35 in Natalia
- US 90 in Castroville
- North end: Loop 1604 in San Antonio; SH 16 in San Antonio (former)

Location
- Country: United States
- State: Texas
- Counties: Medina, Bexar

Highway system
- Highways in Texas; Interstate; US; State; Former; Toll; Loops; Spurs; FM/RM; Park; Rec
← FM 470	→ FM 472

Farm to Market Road 471 (FM 471) is an FM highway in the San Antonio area of Texas. The highway is known as Culebra Road within Bexar County.

== Route description ==
FM 471 begins at an intersection with I-35 in Natalia. The highway shortly begins an overlap with SH 132 and the two highways travel through the town together. FM 471 leaves the highway and travels to the town of LaCoste. The highway enters Castroville and has a short overlap with US 90. FM 471 serves the small community of Rio Medina before intersecting FM 1283 near Lake Medina. The highway turns after here and runs in a southeast (northbound)–northwest (southbound) direction, despite still being signed north–south. FM 471 enters the city of San Antonio near the Government Canyon State Natural Area. Near SeaWorld, FM 471 ends at an intersection Loop 1604 (Anderson Loop).

== History ==
=== Previous route ===
FM 471 was first designated on July 9, 1945, from Dilley to Divot. The highway was then extended further north 5.0 miles (8.0 km) toward Batesville on July 22, 1949. The route was cancelled the next month on August 25. The highway was combined with FM 117.

=== Current route ===
FM 471 opened May 23, 1951, running from US 81 (now SH 132) in Natalia to US 90 in Castroville. On January 29, 1953, FM 1105 from US 90 north and east 24.4 miles (39.3 km) to a road intersection was cancelled and combined with FM 471. The highway was extended further east to SH 16 later that year on October 28. The highway was extended further south to I-35 on May 6, 1964. On June 27, 1995, the entire route from Loop 1604 to SH 16 was designated Urban Road 471 (UR 471).

On December 18, 2014, the section of FM 471 between Loop 1604 and the Leon Valley city limits was turned back to the city of San Antonio and deleted from the state highway system; this was part of TxDOT's San Antonio turnback program, which gave 21.8 miles of roads to the city. By 2018, the project acceptance letter was issued. As a result of the order and project acceptance letter, the section of FM 471 within Leon Valley became State Highway Spur 471. This eliminated UR 471.

== Junction list ==
County	Location	mi	km	Destinations	Notes
Medina	Natalia	0.0	0.0	I-35 – Pearsall, San Antonio	Southern terminus of FM 471
Medina	Natalia	1.2	1.9	SH 132 north – Lytle	Southern end of SH 132 overlap
Medina	Natalia	1.7	2.7	SH 132 south – Devine	Northern end of SH 132 overlap
Medina		5.2	8.4	FM 463 south – Devine	Southern end of FM 463 overlap
Medina		5.7	9.2	FM 463 north – Lytle	North end of FM 463 overlap
Medina	LaCoste	12.2	19.6	FM 2790 south – Lytle	
Medina	Castroville	15.9	25.6	US 90 east – San Antonio	Southern end of US 90 overlap
Medina	Castroville	17.0	27.4	US 90 west – Hondo	Northern end of US 90 overlap
Medina		22.6	36.4	FM 1957 east (Potranco Road)	
Medina	Rio Medina	23.2	37.3	FM 2676 west – Quihi	
Medina		33.5	53.9	FM 1283 north – Pipe Creek, Lake Medina	
Medina	San Antonio	34.3	55.2	SH 211 (Texas Research Parkway) – Government Canyon State Natural Area	
Bexar	San Antonio	39.4	63.4	FM 1560 north – Helotes	
Bexar	San Antonio	40.8	65.7	Loop 1604 (Anderson Loop) to SH 16 / FM 1957	
1.000 mi = 1.609 km; 1.000 km = 0.621 mi: Concurrency terminus

== Spur 471 ==
State Highway Spur 471
- Location: Bexar County
- Length: 0.4 mi (640 m)
- Existed: December 18, 2014–present

Spur 471 is a state highway spur located in Leon Valley. The highway was designated on December 18, 2014, when FM 471 was decommissioned inside Loop 1604. The highway begins at the San Antonio–Leon Valley city limits and runs east for approximately a half mile to State Highway 16 (Bandera Road). Spur 471 is known locally as Grissom Road. An Earlier Spur 471 was designated on October 1, 1968, from I-20 in Colorado City to Loop 377. This was cancelled on June 21, 1990, and changed to Business State Highway 208-B. Loop 377 became Business Interstate 20-J that same day.

Junction list

The entire route is in Bexar County.

Location	mi	km	Destinations	Notes
San Antonio–Leon Valley line	0.0	0.0	Grissom Road	
Leon Valley	0.4	0.64	SH 16 (Bandera Road) – Bandera, San Antonio	
1.000 mi = 1.609 km; 1.000 km = 0.621 mi
