= Losoya, Texas =

- Unincorporated community
- Location of Losoya in Texas Losoya (the United States)
- Coordinates: 29°14′01″N 98°27′23″W
- Country: United States
- State: Texas
- County: Bexar
- Elevation: 492 ft (150 m)

Population (2000)
  - Total: 322
- Time zone: Central (CST)
- Area codes: 210, 726 (planned)
- FIPS code
- GNIS feature ID: 1361807

Losoya is an unincorporated community in Bexar County, Texas, United States. According to the Handbook of Texas, the community had a population of 322 in 2000. It is a part of the San Antonio–New Braunfels metropolitan area.

== History ==
The area in what is known as Losoya today was first settled sometime after the Civil War. A post office was established at Losoya in 1879 and remained in operation until 1910. It was closed for ten years before it officially shut down in 1910. Before then, it was named Lecomteville for its first postmaster, Leon Lecomte, but its name was changed to Losoya when the post office was established. It may have been a misspelling of local settlers surnamed Laysawyer. Losoya had a population of 100 in 1878. At the start of the 20th century, the community had a church and a few stores. The population declined to 89 in 1910, then to 75 from 1930 to 1940. It began to grow when San Antonio started developing into a major city, and its population jumped to 322 from 1990 through 2000.

The Battle of Medina was fought in the community on August 18, 1813.

== Geography ==
Losoya is located on Farm to Market Road 1937, 18 miles (29 km) southeast of Downtown San Antonio in southeastern Bexar County.

== Education ==
Losoya had its own school around 1900. Today, the community is served by the Southside Independent School District.
