= Rio Medina, Texas =

Unincorporated community in Texas, US

Coordinates: 29°26′23″N 98°53′03″W

Rio Medina or Riomedina is an unincorporated community in Medina County, Texas, United States. It is located approximately six miles north of Castroville and is part of the San Antonio Metropolitan Statistical Area. According to the 2006–07 Texas Almanac, it had a population of 60 people in 2000. According to an online community profile, Rio Medina has a population of 541 people (population year not provided).

The town is located on the Medina River and is approximately 7.5 miles south of Medina Lake. Rio Medina supported construction workers during the Medina Lake Dam in the early 1910s.

Rio Medina has a post office located on highway FM 471 inside the general store.
