= Medina Valley =

Coordinates: 29.5406°N 98.9335°W

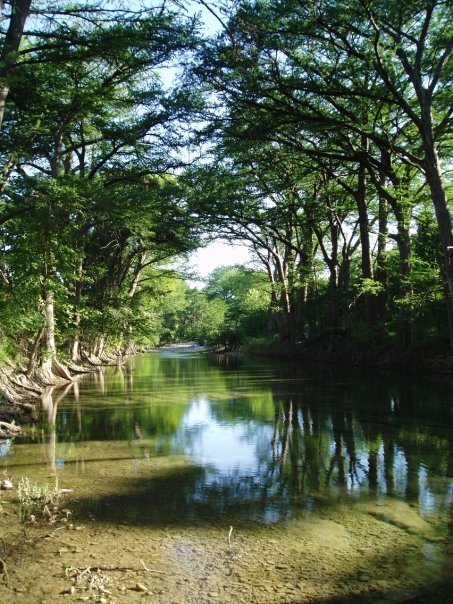
The Medina River in the Medina Valley.

Medina Valley, also known as the Medina River Valley, is an area in south central Texas containing the Medina River, Lake Medina, and the Medina Dam. It serves to drain the Balcones Escarpment of the Texas Hill Country and irrigate the crop fields contained therein. It is approximately 120 miles (190 km) long and is named for the Medina River.

== Natural features ==
The geology of Medina Valley has been analyzed for some time, with a prominent feature being the Balcones Fault Zone. There are a number of flora and fauna species associated with the Medina Valley. Some of the species in and close to Medina Valley have their distributional range defined by the Medina Valley and/or the Balcones Fault. For example, the California Fan Palm, Washingtonia filifera occurs only in the western USA west of the Medina Valley and Balcones Fault.

== Counties in Medina Valley ==
- Bandera County, Texas,
- Eastern Medina County, Texas,
- southwestern Bexar County, Texas,
- Atascosa County, Texas

== Communities in Medina Valley ==
- Bandera, Texas
- Castroville, Texas
- Mico, Texas
- Rio Medina, Texas
- LaCoste, Texas
- Lakehills, Texas
- Lytle, Texas
- Pearson, Texas
- Somerset, Texas
- St. Hedwig, Texas
- Elmendorf, Texas
- Von Ormy, Texas
- Medina, Texas
