= Bader, Texas =

Ghost town in Texas, US

Bader
- Ghost town
- Location in Texas
- Coordinates: 29.3716230°N 98.9547522°W
- Country: United States
- State: Texas
- County: Medina
- Elevation: 1,010 ft (308 m)

Bader, also known as Bader Settlement, is a ghost town in Medina County, Texas, United States.

Situated on the Old San Antonio Road, it was named for Joe Bader, who opened a hotel there c. 1860. The town got its water supply from a nearby spring, and after drying up, c. 1880, Bader sold his land in the area to August Hutzler. Other settlers arrived, and a school was built on Sterley Jagge's land; it was consolidated with the nearby Dunlay school by 1915. The hotel reopened in 1935, and continued operating via Stanley Haby—Hutzler's grandson—until the 1980s.
