= Aberdeen, Medina County, Texas =

Ghost town in Texas, US

Aberdeen is a ghost town in Medina County, Texas, United States. It was noted c. 1858, by J. C. Reid's journal Reid's Tramp. It had two grocery stores and three residents.
