= BTLP =

BTLP may refer to:

- Barcelona Traction, Light, and Power Company, a corporation that controlled light and power utilities in Spain
- Grammy Award for Best Tropical Latin Performance, a Grammy Award presented annually between 1995 and 1999
