= Rufus Ligon =

American baseball player

- Pitcher
- Born: May 6, 1903; Cameron, Texas, U.S.
- Died: September 24, 1992 (aged 89); Dunlay, Texas, U.S.
- Threw: Left

Negro league baseball debut
- 1932, for the Little Rock Grays

Last appearance
- 1945, for the Memphis Red Sox

Teams
- Little Rock Grays (1932); Memphis Red Sox (1944–1945)

Rufus Charles Ligon (May 6, 1903 – September 24, 1992) was an American Negro league pitcher in the 1930s and 1940s.

A native of Cameron, Texas, Ligon made his Negro leagues debut in 1932 with the Little Rock Grays and in 1944 played with the Memphis Red Sox. He played for Memphis again the following season. He died in Dunlay, Texas in 1992 at age 89.
