= Medina River =

Medina River Río Mariano, Río San Jose, Río de Bagres
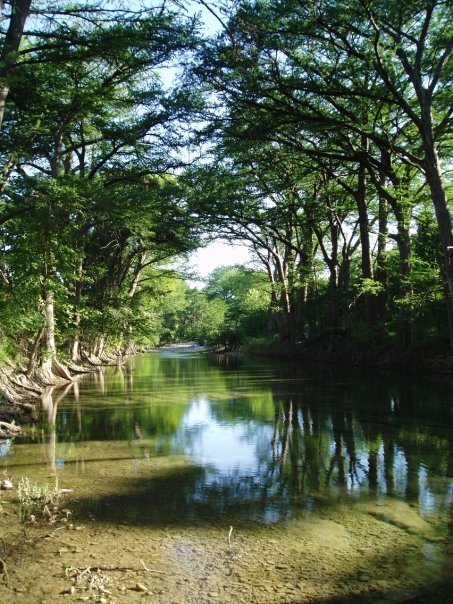
- Medina River near Bandera, Texas
- Map of the Medina River watershed

Location
- Country: United States
- State: Texas

Physical characteristics
- Source
  - location: near Medina, Bandera County, Texas
  - coordinates: 29°47′46″N 99°15′19″W
- Mouth: San Antonio River
  - location: Bexar County, Texas
  - coordinates: 29°14′04″N 98°24′28″W
  - elevation: 128 m (420 ft)

Basin features
- River system: Guadalupe River

The Medina River is a river located in south central Texas, United States, in the Medina Valley. It was also known as the Rio Mariano, Rio San Jose, or Rio de Bagres (Catfish river). Much of the course of the river is owned and operated by the Bexar-Medina-Atascosa Water District to provide irrigation services to farmers and ranchers.

== Course ==
The river's source is from springs in the Edwards Plateau in northwest Bandera County, Texas. The river's North and West prongs converge in the community of Medina, Texas, forming the main stem of the river which then flows through Bandera, Texas. The Medina Dam in northeast Medina County, Texas impounds the river to form Medina Lake. South of the lake, the river runs through Castroville, Texas before it flows through south San Antonio and merges with the San Antonio River in southern Bexar County, Texas, for a course of 120 miles.

== History ==
The Medina River was named after Pedro de Medina, a Spanish cartographer, by Alonso de León, Spanish governor of Coahuila, New Spain in 1689. It once served as the official boundary between Texas and Coahuila with the San Antonio River being considered its tributary. At that time, the river was called the Medina all the way to the Gulf of Mexico, but now the part below the confluence is called the San Antonio River. The Medina River once received significant waste discharge from upstream catfish farming operations, which utilized more water than was sustainable to the basin's safe usage.

From 1849, Castroville on the river was a water stop on the San Antonio-El Paso Road and a stagecoach station on the San Antonio-El Paso Mail and San Antonio-San Diego Mail Line.

On August 2, 1978, after forty-eight inches of rain fell in the North Prong basin in twenty-four-hours, the river crested at 46.62 feet which is 22.62 feet above the major flood stage level of 24 feet. Twenty-two lives were lost and damage resulted in millions of dollars of property loss. After a cleanup program by the United States Army Corps of Engineers and private contractors, the Federal Emergency Management Agency ordered strict floodplain regulations and new rainfall reporting and warning systems were put in place.

== Natural features ==
Much of the water to the Medina River is produced by springs emerging due to the presence of the Balcones Fault. This locale of the Balcones Fault is associated with an important ecological dividing line for species occurrence. For example, species such as the California Fan Palm, Washingtonia filifera, occur only west of the Medina River or the Balcones Fault.

== See also ==
- List of rivers of Texas
- Medina Valley Independent School District
- Medina, Bandera County, Texas
