= Frederick Stark Pearson =

American electrical engineer and entrepreneur

Fred Stark Pearson
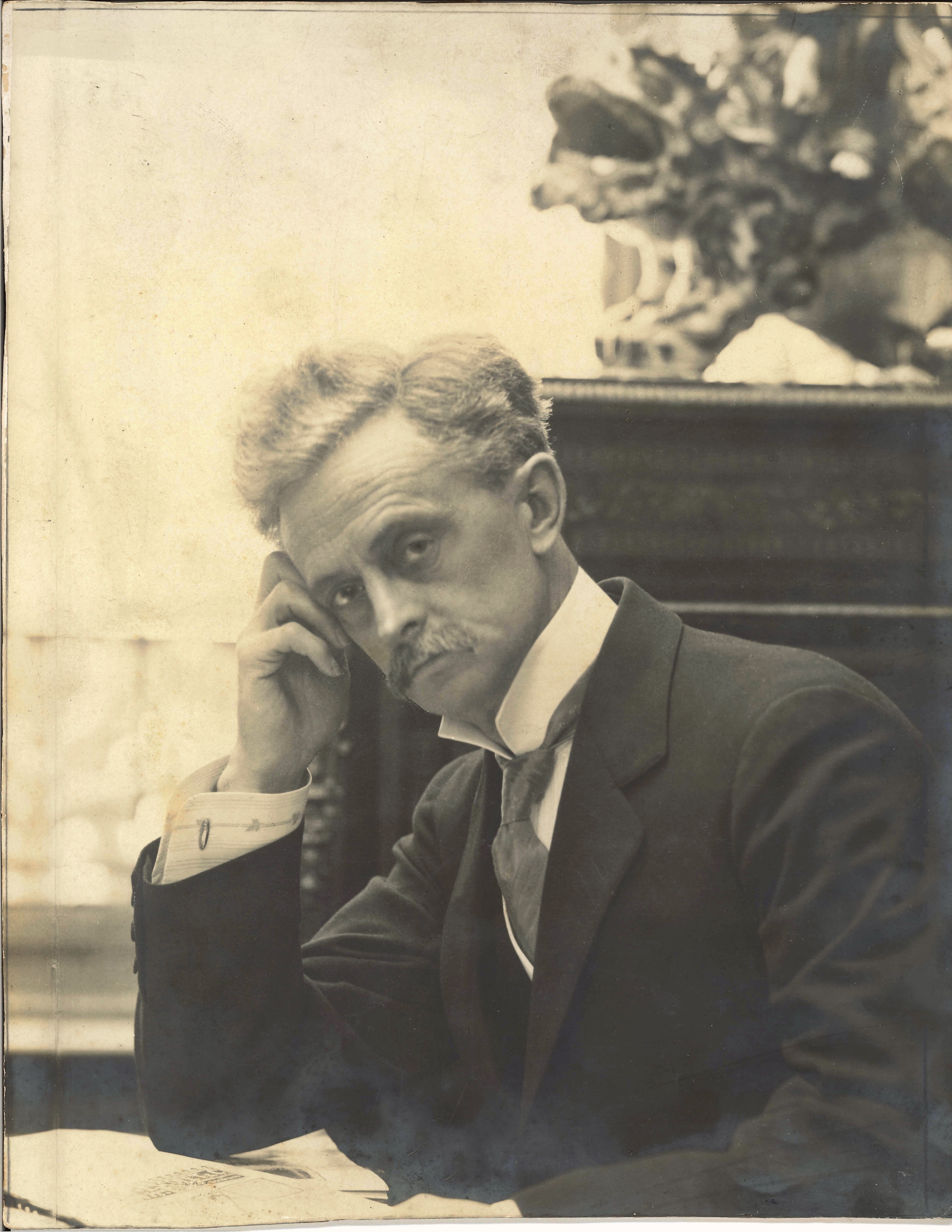
- Fred Stark Pearson
- Born: Fred S. Pearson; July 3, 1861; Lowell, Massachusetts, U.S.
- Died: May 7, 1915 (aged 53); RMS Lusitania, Atlantic Ocean
- Other name: "Sarkos" Western Union Telegram
- Occupations: Electrical Engineer, Entrepreneur
- Spouse: Mabel Ward Pearson

Signature
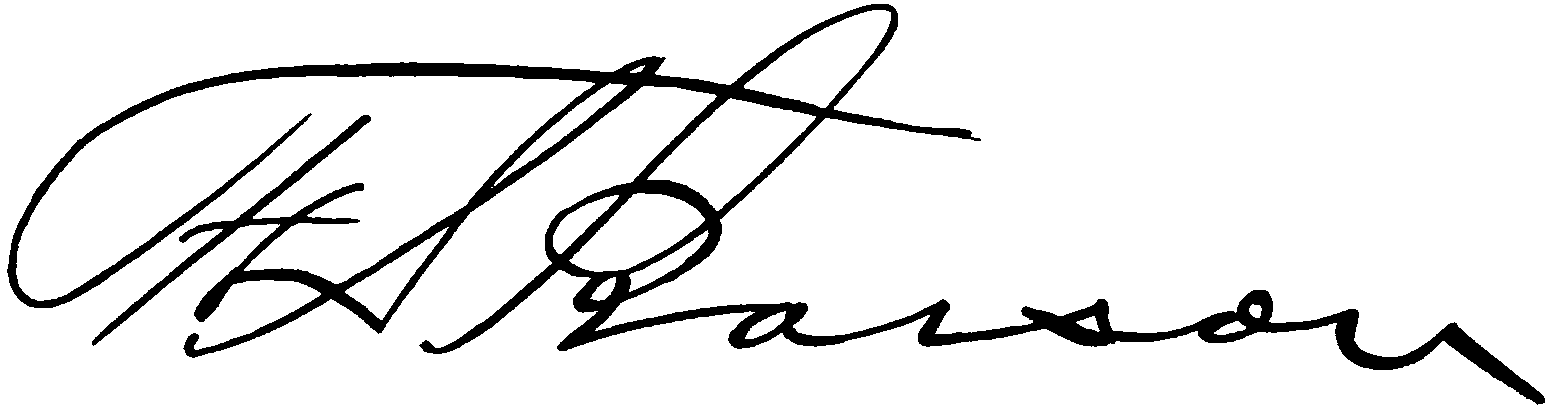

Frederick Stark Pearson (July 3, 1861 – May 7, 1915) was an American electrical engineer and entrepreneur.

== Biography ==
Pearson was the son of Ambrose and Hannah (Edgerly) Pearson. He graduated from Tufts University in 1883 with an A.M.B. and received an A.M.M. degree one year later. Previously, for one year (1879–80), he was instructor in chemistry in the Massachusetts Institute of Technology; later (1883–86), he was instructor in mathematics and applied mechanics at Tufts College. From college, he went on to develop the electric transportation system in Boston and, with electric powered streetcars of major importance, in 1894 he was appointed the head engineer for Metropolitan Street Railways in New York City. Pearson built a reputation as an innovative electrical engineer in the United States and he was soon contracted by governments and businesses as a consulting engineer for power generating stations throughout North America. A man with great business skills and foresight, with ready financial backers he undertook major projects in North and South America. He was the founder of Barcelona Traction and São Paulo Tramway, Light and Power Company which is now Brookfield Asset Management.

While in Canada, he developed a relationship with a bright and aggressive young lawyer/stockbroker in Montreal, Quebec by the name of James Dunn. Pearson encouraged Dunn to take up residency in London, at the time the most important financial market in the world.

With Dunn's brokerage house underwriting his ventures share offerings, sufficient capital was raised to allow Pearson to create a massive business empire that included the São Paulo Tramway, Light and Power Company in Brazil, the Mexican North Western Railway, the Mexican Tramway Company, and the Mexican Light and Power Company in Mexico, and the British American Nickel Company in Canada.

Unstable governments in Mexico along with rampant bribery and corruption of public officials caused Pearson considerable grief. The government of president Venustiano Carranza nationalized his Mexican Tramway Company and in the end, he lost virtually everything he had invested in Mexico. During this time, he was behind the 1911 construction of the Medina Dam on the Medina River in what is now Mico, Texas and built an irrigation district encompassing more than 34,000 acres (138 km^{2}). The town of Pearson, Texas was named in his honor.

In 1912, he organized a syndicate in Hale County, Texas near Plainview for drilling irrigation wells to irrigate about 60,000 acres (243 km^{2}). During the course of his work in Texas, Pearson founded the town of Natalia, naming it after his daughter, Natalie Pearson Nicholson.

In 1913, he negotiated a deal with the Spanish government for a hydro project on the Ebro River and formed the Barcelona Traction, Light and Power Company to carry out the construction that was completed in 1915. However, World War I limited his activity.

He and his wife, Mabel Ward Pearson, lost their lives on May 7, 1915, while travelling to England on business and to visit his daughter Natalie who was living there. They were on the ocean liner RMS Lusitania when it was torpedoed off the southern coast of Ireland by German U-boat U-20. They are interred in Woodlawn Cemetery in The Bronx, New York City.

Pearson Hall, home of the Chemistry Department at Tufts University, is named for him.
