= Texas State Highway 132 =

State highway in Medina, Atascosa, and Bexar counties in Texas, United States

State Highway 132
- SH 132, highlighted in red

Route information
- Maintained by TxDOT
- Length: 12.71 mi (20.45 km)
- Existed: March 26, 1991–present

Major junctions
- South end: I-35 southwest of Devine
- SH 173 in Devine
- North end: I-35 east of Lytle

Location
- Country: United States
- State: Texas
- Counties: Medina, Atascosa, Bexar

Highway system
- Highways in Texas; Interstate; US; State; Former; Toll; Loops; Spurs; FM/RM; Park; Rec
← SH 131	→ SH 133

State Highway 132 (SH 132) is a 12.71-mile (20.45 km) state highway in Medina, Atascosa, and Bexar counties in Texas, United States, that is a northwestern loop off of Interstate 35 (I-35) and runs through Devine, Natalia, and Lytle. It follows a former alignment of U.S. Route 81 (US 81), which was bypassed by the parallel I-35. SH 132 was established in 1991, when US 81 was truncated to Fort Worth.

== Route description ==
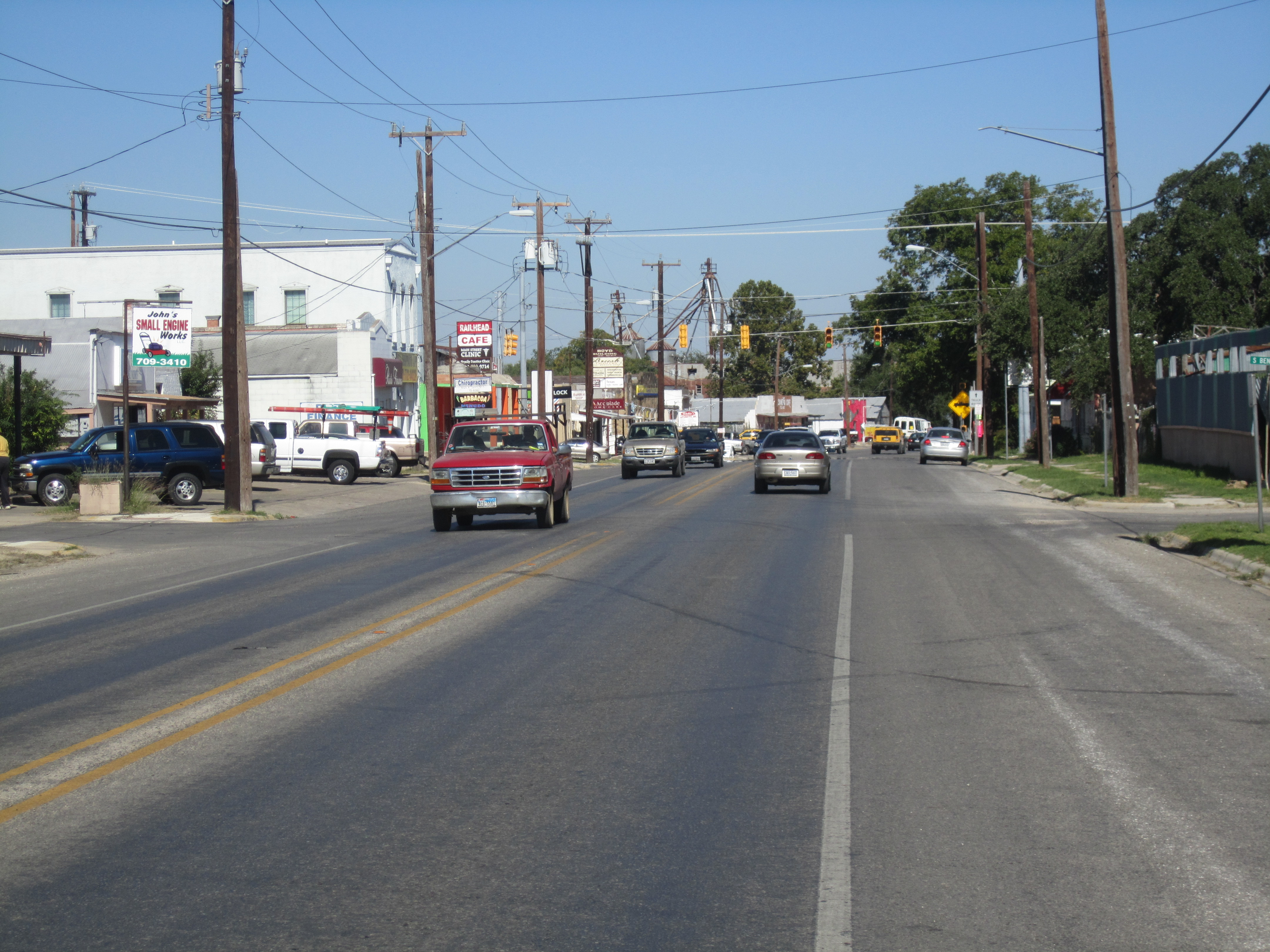
Northbound on SH 132 (Main Street) in Lytle, October 2010

SH 132 begins at I-35, exit 121, in Medina County, southwest of Devine. The highway runs through the town as Teel Drive, where it intersects Texas State Highway 173 and begins an overlap with FM 463. The concurrency with FM 463 ends just northeast of Medina County Road 772. SH 132 enters the town of Natalia where it has a short overlap with FM 471; in Natalia, the highway is known as 2nd Street. After leaving the city limits of Natalia, SH 132 crosses into Atascosa County. The highway enters the town of Lytle where it is known as Main Street. SH 132 has a brief overlap with FM 2790 before entering Bexar County, leaving Lytle, and ending at I-35, exit 133.

== History ==

SH 132 was originally proposed on April 25, 1928, as a route from Livingston to Liberty. On September 22, 1932, this route became a portion of SH 146 (which was extended from Dayton to Cleveland on August 3 of that year, but there was a lack of funding, but this road was restored as SH 321 on October 30, 1939).

The current highway was designated on March 26, 1991, to replace US 81, which was decommissioned south of Fort Worth.

== Junction list ==
County	Location	mi	km	Destinations	Notes
Medina		0.0	0.0	I-35 – Natalia, Moore	Southern terminus; I-35 exit 121
Medina	Devine	1.8	2.9	SH 173 – Hondo, Jourdanton	
Medina	Devine	2.9	4.7	FM 463 south to I-35 / Colonial Parkway	Southern end of FM 463 concurrency
Medina		3.8	6.1	FM 463 north	Northern end of FM 463 concurrency
Medina	Natalia	6.1	9.8	FM 471 north – Castroville	Southern end of FM 471 concurrency
Medina	Natalia	6.5	10.5	FM 471 south	Northern end of FM 471 concurrency
Atascosa	Lytle	10.7	17.2	FM 2790 north – La Coste, Castroville	Southern end of FM 2790 concurrency
Atascosa	Lytle	11.5	18.5	FM 2790 south (McDonald Street) – Poteet, Somerset	North end of FM 2790 overlap
Bexar		12.7	20.4	I-35 north – San Antonio	Northern terminus; I-35 exit 133
1.000 mi = 1.609 km; 1.000 km = 0.621 mi: Concurrency terminus; Incomplete access

== See also ==
- List of state highways in Texas
