= Pearson, Texas =

Unincorporated community in Texas, US

Pearson
- Unincorporated
- Location within Texas
- Coordinates: 29.2731°N 98.8750°W
- Country: United States
- State: Texas
- County: Medina
- Founded: 1912
- Founded by: Charles F. C. Ladd
- Named after: Frederick Stark Pearson
- Elevation: 250 m (820 ft)
- Time zone: UTC-06:00 (CST)
  - Summer (DST): UTC-05:00 (CDT)
- ZIP Code: 78016
- Geocode: geohash.org/9v1ww09mt
- GNIS feature ID: 1380337

Pearson, named for Frederick Stark Pearson, is an unincorporated community in Medina County, Texas, United States. It is part of the San Antonio Metropolitan Statistical Area. Pearson was established in 1912 by the San Antonio Suburban Irrigation Company (Note: Ochoa, Ruben (1995-06-01) [1952]. "Pearson, TX". Texas State Historical Association.) as a stop on the Southern Pacific Railroad. The community lies approximately seven miles west of LaCoste on FM 471 South and before the Noonan Switch and Natalia. It was formerly the site of a shop, a machinery and material yard, and a house for a caretaker.
