= D'Hanis, Texas =

Census-designated place in Texas, US

D'Hanis
- Census-designated place
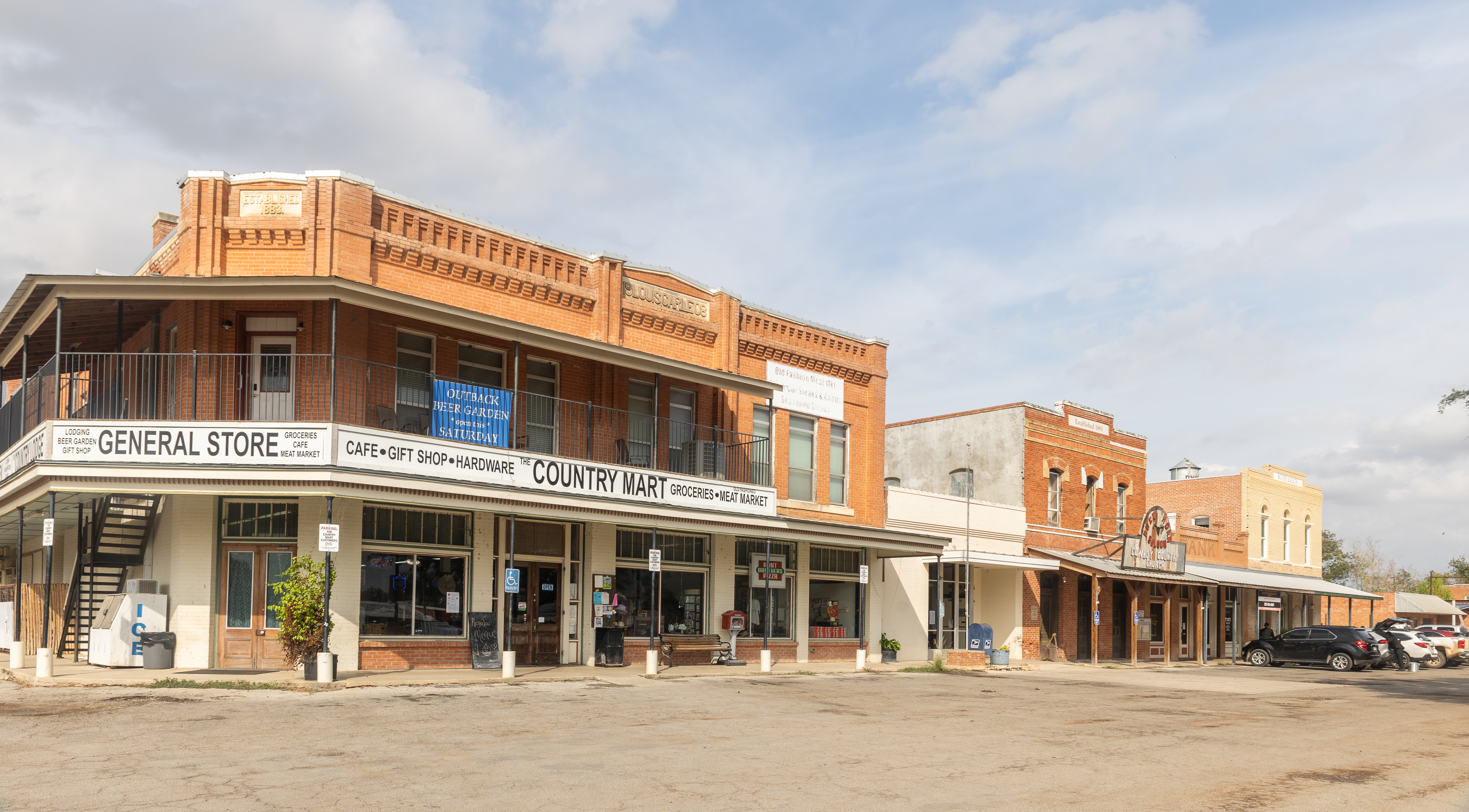
- Historic district in D'Hanis
- Nickname: New D'Hanis
- Location within Texas
- Coordinates: 29°19′56″N 99°15′47″W
- Country: United States of America
- State: Texas
- County: Medina County
- Established: c. 1845
- Founder: Count von D'Hanis
- Elevation: 883 ft (269 m)

Population (2020)
  - Total: 785
- Time zone: UTC-6:00 (CST)
  - Summer (DST): UTC-5:00 (CDT)
- GNIS feature ID: 2586924

D'Hanis (/dəˈhɛnɪs/) is a census-designated place in central Medina County, Texas, United States. It is part of the San Antonio—New Braunfels, Texas Metropolitan Statistical Area. The population was 785 at the 2020 census, up from 548 in 2000. It was primarily settled in the 1800s by German emigrants.

D'Hanis is located at the intersections of U.S. Route 90, Farm to Market Road 1796 and Farm to Market Road 2200 on Seco Creek. The community is sometimes called New D'Hanis to distinguish it from the site of old D'Hanis one mile to the east.

== History ==
D'Hanis is named for Count von D'Hanis, who founded the town about 1845. D'Hanis was settled by 29 Alsatian families from present-day France and Germany. Many residents spoke Alsatian and German, however, some Alsatians were ethnic Germans who clung to the German culture, language, and traditions. D'Hanis was one of several towns that Henri Castro founded.

== Geography ==
D'Hanis is at an elevation of 883 feet (269 m) above sea level.

== Education ==
The D'Hanis Independent School District maintains a K-12 school located near Highway 90. The current school has been renovated and expanded many times; the most recent additions were completed in the fall of 2009. The current secondary school principal is Joshua King and the district superintendent is Brian Thompson. The elementary principal is Lauren Busse. Its mascots are (middle school) Colts and (high school) Cowboys and Cowgirls. Basketball, football, baseball, golf, track and tennis are varsity sports there.

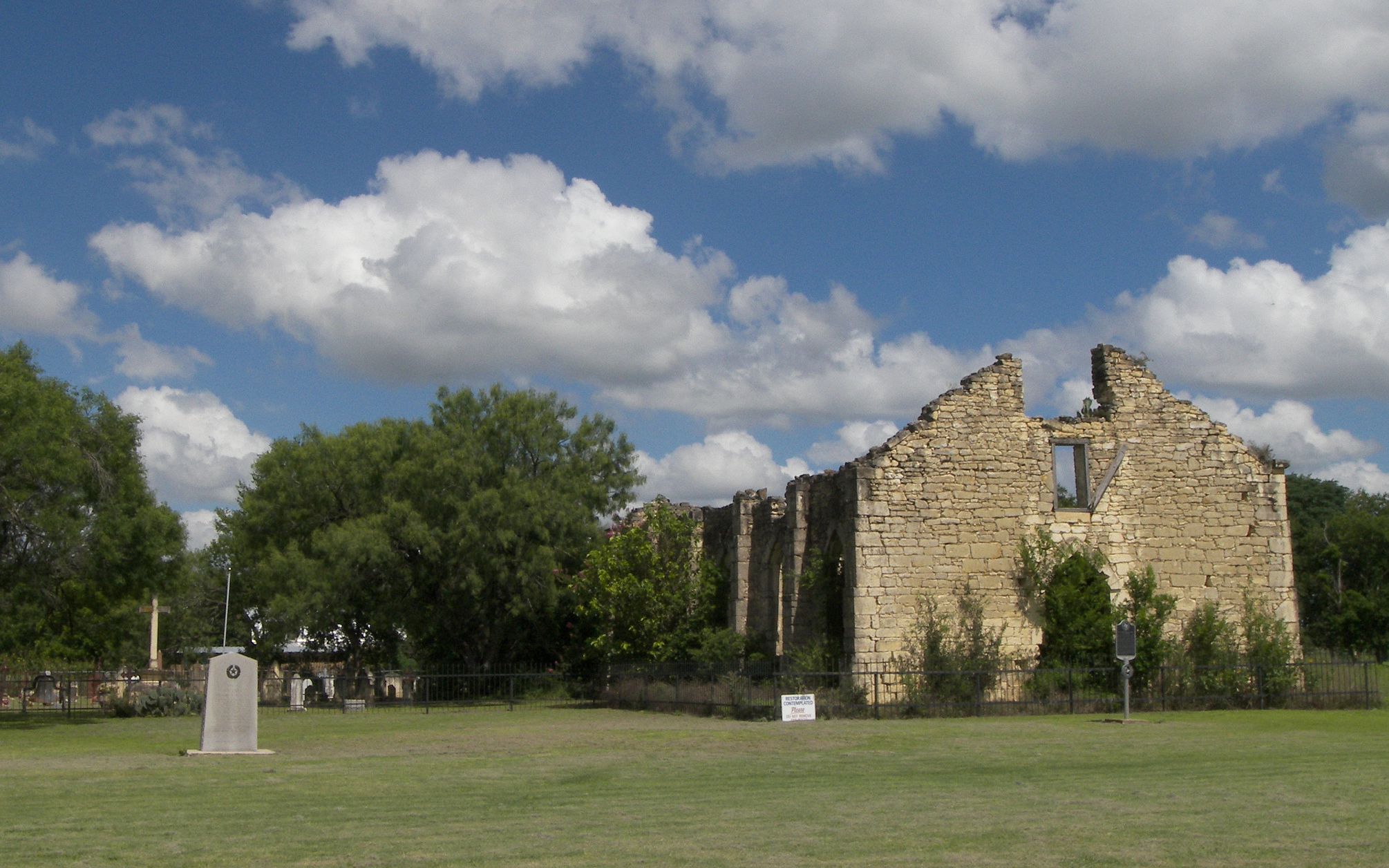
The D'Hanis Cemetery and ruins of Saint Dominic Catholic Church

== Demographics ==
Historical population
Census	Pop.	Note	%±
2010	847		—
2020	785		−7.3%
U.S. Decennial Census; 1850–1900 1910; 1920 1930 1940; 1950 1960 1970; 1980 1990 2000; 2010 2020

D'Hani first appeared as a census designated place in the 2010 U.S. census.

=== 2020 census ===
D'Hanis CDP, Texas – Racial and ethnic composition Note: the US Census treats Hispanic/Latino as an ethnic category. This table excludes Latinos from the racial categories and assigns them to a separate category. Hispanics/Latinos may be of any race.
Race / Ethnicity (NH = Non-Hispanic)	Pop 2010	Pop 2020	% 2010	% 2020
White alone (NH)	449	434	53.01%	55.29%
Black or African American alone (NH)	0	2	0.00%	0.25%
Native American or Alaska Native alone (NH)	1	0	0.12%	0.00%
Asian alone (NH)	1	2	0.12%	0.25%
Native Hawaiian or Pacific Islander alone (NH)	0	0	0.00%	0.00%
Other race alone (NH)	0	3	0.00%	0.38%
Mixed race or Multiracial (NH)	2	16	0.24%	2.04%
Hispanic or Latino (any race)	394	328	46.52%	41.78%
Total	847	785	100.00%	100.00%

At the 2020 United States census, 785 people resided within the D'Hanis CDP. The portion of the population under the age of 5 was 2.7%, whereas the population over the age of 65 was 22.5%, with a median age of 45.2. The median household income is $53,125 per year. 11.0% of the population holds a bachelor's degree or higher, and 35.5% of the population has at least a high school diploma or equivalent degree. Married-couple families make up 48.6% of households. The racial makeup was 76.8% White, 0.4% Black, 0.6% American Indian or Alaskan Native, 0.3% Asian, 7.5% other or unspecified, and 14.4% of two or more races. 41.8% of the population was Hispanic or Latino (of any race).

== Tourism ==
The few remaining walls of St. Dominic's Church and Cemetery, now part of the ghost town of Old D'Hanis, are situated south of Highway 90. The ruins of Fort Lincoln, another historical attraction, can be found north of town along FM 1796.
