= Medina County, Texas =

County in Texas, United States

- County
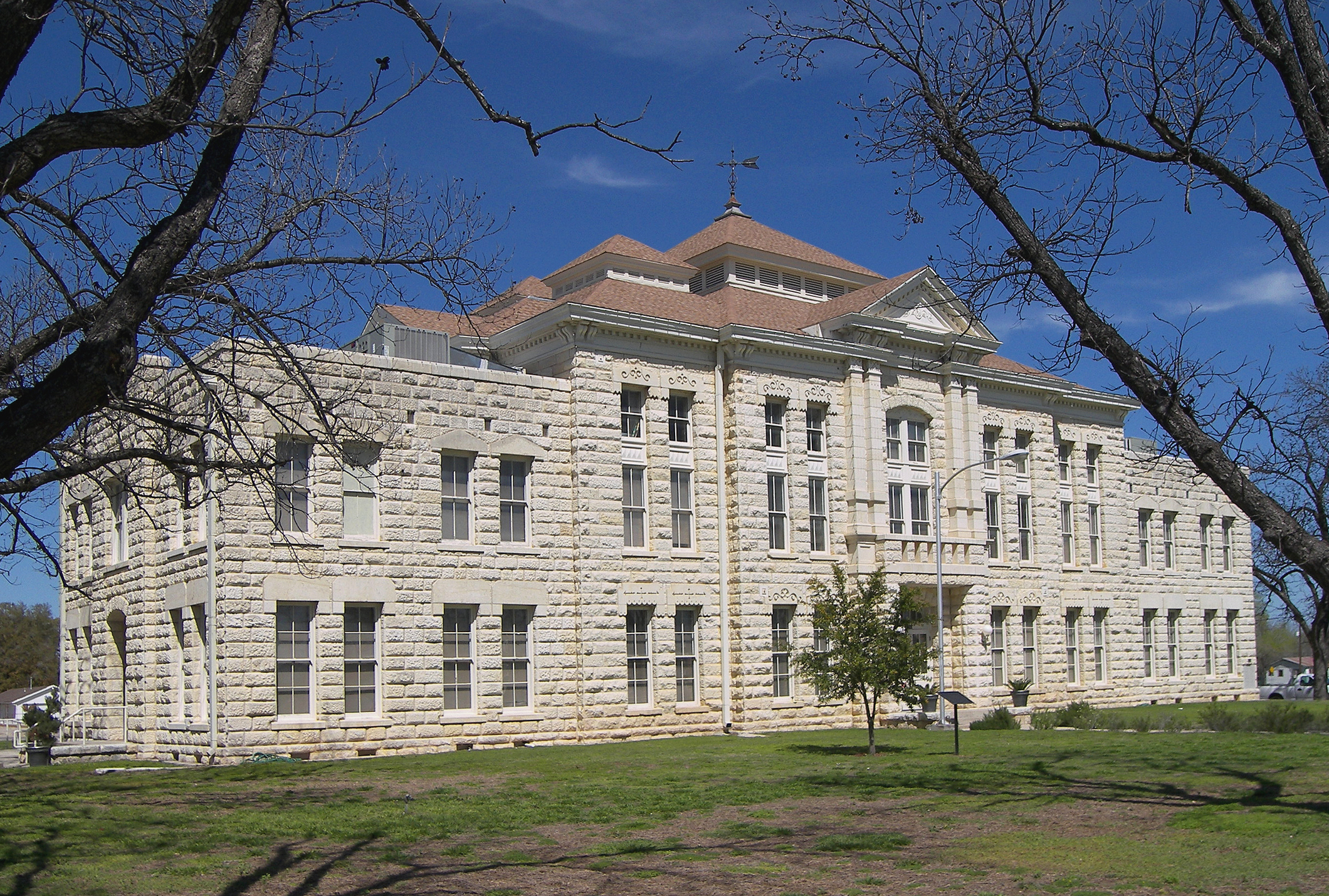
- The Medina County Courthouse in Hondo

- Location within the U.S. state of Texas
- Coordinates: 29°21′N 99°07′W
- Country: United States
- State: Texas
- Founded: 1848
- Named for: Medina River
- Seat: Hondo
- Largest city: Hondo

Area
  - Total: 1,335 sq mi (3,460 km^{2})
  - Land: 1,325 sq mi (3,430 km^{2})
  - Water: 9.2 sq mi (24 km^{2}) 0.7%

Population (2020)
  - Total: 50,748
  - Estimate (2025): 56,881 ▲
  - Density: 38.30/sq mi (14.79/km^{2})
- Time zone: UTC−6 (Central)
  - Summer (DST): UTC−5 (CDT)
- Congressional district: 23rd
- Website: www.medinatx.gov

Medina County is a county located in the South central part of the U.S. state of Texas. As of the 2020 census, its population was 50,748. Its county seat is Hondo. The county is named for the Medina River. The extreme northern part of the county lies within the Edwards Plateau, which elevates into the Texas Hill Country. The Medina Dam, the fourth-largest in the nation when completed in 1913, is listed on the National Register of Historic Places. The irrigation project, creating Medina Lake, was built by 1500 skilled workers who worked in shifts operating 24 hours a day to complete the dam in two years. Medina County is part of the San Antonio metropolitan statistical area.

== History ==
The county is named after the Medina River, which was named in 1689 after Spanish cartographer Pedro de Medina by Spanish explorer Alonso de Leon, the first European to encounter the river. Because Pedro de Medina derived his surname from the Andalusian city of Medina-Sidonia, the name Medina comes from the Arabic for city.

The Texas Legislature formed Medina County on February 12, 1848, and enlarged it on February 1, 1850, using land taken from Bexar County. Castroville was the county seat, and the county erected the first permanent courthouse there in 1854. The county seat moved to Hondo in 1892, and a new courthouse was completed there in 1893.

=== Texas-Indian Wars ===
The county was home to tribes such as the Lipan Apache, Coahuiltecan, and Tonkawa.

The county was subject to frequent Comanche and Kiowa raids during the early-late 1800s. Battles like the Battle of Seco Creek in 1838 highlight the conflicts with Native Americans in the county. In 1862, Comanches kidnapped 3 children 10 miles south of Bandera. Also, in 1866, Lipan Apaches killed and kidnapped 2 young settlers on Hondo Creek. On June 11, 1873, Comanches attacked four settlers on Verde Creek near modern day Hondo. By 1875, the Comanches were done raiding the county. Although the Comanche were gone, other tribes, like the Lipan Apaches and Kickapoos still were raiding the county. The last Indian raid in the county happened on April 22, 1877, when 19-year-old Joe Wilton was killed by Kickapoo Indians at Black Creek near Devine, marking the end of the American Indian Wars In Medina County.

== Geography ==
According to the U.S. Census Bureau, the county has a total area of 1,335 square miles (3,460 km^{2}), of which 9.2 square miles (24 km^{2}) (0.7%) are covered by water.

=== Major highways ===
- Interstate 35
- U.S. Highway 90
- State Highway 16
- State Highway 132
- State Highway 173
- State Highway 211

=== Adjacent counties ===
- Bandera County (north)
- Bexar County (east)
- Atascosa County (southeast)
- Frio County (south)
- Uvalde County (west)

== Demographics ==
Historical population
| Census | Pop. | Note | %± |
|---|---|---|---|
| 1850 | 909 | | — |
| 1860 | 1,838 | | 102.2% |
| 1870 | 2,078 | | 13.1% |
| 1880 | 4,492 | | 116.2% |
| 1890 | 5,730 | | 27.6% |
| 1900 | 7,783 | | 35.8% |
| 1910 | 13,415 | | 72.4% |
| 1920 | 11,679 | | −12.9% |
| 1930 | 13,989 | | 19.8% |
| 1940 | 16,106 | | 15.1% |
| 1950 | 17,013 | | 5.6% |
| 1960 | 18,904 | | 11.1% |
| 1970 | 20,249 | | 7.1% |
| 1980 | 23,164 | | 14.4% |
| 1990 | 27,312 | | 17.9% |
| 2000 | 39,304 | | 43.9% |
| 2010 | 46,006 | | 17.1% |
| 2020 | 50,748 | | 10.3% |
| 2025 (est.) | 56,881 | ▲ | 12.1% |
U.S. Decennial Census; 1850–2010 2010 2020

=== Racial and ethnic composition ===
Medina County, Texas – Racial and ethnic composition Note: the US Census treats Hispanic/Latino as an ethnic category. This table excludes Latinos from the racial categories and assigns them to a separate category. Hispanics/Latinos may be of any race.
| Race / Ethnicity (NH = Non-Hispanic) | Pop 1980 | Pop 1990 | Pop 2000 | Pop 2010 | Pop 2020 | % 1980 | % 1990 | % 2000 | % 2010 | % 2020 |
|---|---|---|---|---|---|---|---|---|---|---|
| White alone (NH) | 12,896 | 14,928 | 19,919 | 21,408 | 22,324 | 55.67% | 54.66% | 50.68% | 46.53% | 43.99% |
| Black or African American alone (NH) | 76 | 71 | 801 | 913 | 1,252 | 0.33% | 0.26% | 2.04% | 1.98% | 2.47% |
| Native American or Alaska Native alone (NH) | 61 | 83 | 144 | 146 | 158 | 0.26% | 0.30% | 0.37% | 0.32% | 0.31% |
| Asian alone (NH) | 33 | 47 | 117 | 272 | 215 | 0.14% | 0.17% | 0.30% | 0.59% | 0.42% |
| Native Hawaiian or Pacific Islander alone (NH) | x | x | 17 | 24 | 38 | x | x | 0.04% | 0.05% | 0.07% |
| Other race alone (NH) | 56 | 49 | 50 | 28 | 188 | 0.24% | 0.18% | 0.13% | 0.06% | 0.37% |
| Mixed race or Multiracial (NH) | x | x | 383 | 344 | 1,118 | x | x | 0.97% | 0.75% | 2.20% |
| Hispanic or Latino (any race) | 10,042 | 12,134 | 17,873 | 22,871 | 25,455 | 43.35% | 44.43% | 45.47% | 49.71% | 50.16% |
| Total | 23,164 | 27,312 | 39,304 | 46,006 | 50,748 | 100.00% | 100.00% | 100.00% | 100.00% | 100.00% |

=== 2020 census ===
As of the 2020 census, the county had a population of 50,748. The median age was 40.8 years. 23.2% of residents were under the age of 18 and 18.1% of residents were 65 years of age or older. For every 100 females there were 105.7 males, and for every 100 females age 18 and over there were 105.7 males age 18 and over.

The racial makeup of the county was 62.8% White, 2.7% Black or African American, 0.8% American Indian and Alaska Native, 0.5% Asian, 0.1% Native Hawaiian and Pacific Islander, 12.0% from some other race, and 21.2% from two or more races. Hispanic or Latino residents of any race comprised 50.2% of the population.

15.7% of residents lived in urban areas, while 84.3% lived in rural areas.

There were 17,359 households in the county, of which 34.5% had children under the age of 18 living in them. Of all households, 56.3% were married-couple households, 16.3% were households with a male householder and no spouse or partner present, and 22.1% were households with a female householder and no spouse or partner present. About 20.3% of all households were made up of individuals and 10.2% had someone living alone who was 65 years of age or older.

There were 19,594 housing units, of which 11.4% were vacant. Among occupied housing units, 81.0% were owner-occupied and 19.0% were renter-occupied. The homeowner vacancy rate was 1.4% and the rental vacancy rate was 8.3%.

=== 2000 census ===
As of the 2000 census, 39,304 people, 12,880 households, and 10,136 families were residing in the county. The population density was 30 people per square mile (12 people/km^{2}). The 14,826 housing units had an average density of 11 units per square mile (4.2/km^{2}). The racial makeup of the county was 79.38% White, 2.20% Black or African American, 0.68% Native American, 0.33% Asian, 0.05% Pacific Islander, 14.48% from other races, and 2.88% from two or more races. About 45.47% of the population were Hispanics or Latinos of any race.

Of the 12,880 households, 39.1% had children under 18 living with them, 63.2% were married couples living together, 11.1% had a female householder with no husband present, and 21.30% were not families. About 18.2% of all households were made up of individuals, and 8.2% had someone living alone who was 65 or older. The average household size was 2.91 and the average family size was 3.30.

In the county, the age distribution was 29.0% under 18, 8.4% from 18 to 24, 28.7% from 25 to 44, 21.5% from 45 to 64, and 12.4% who were 65 or older. The median age was 34 years. For every 100 females, there were 105.60 males. For every 100 females 18 and over, there were 104.90 males.

The median income for a household in the county was $36,063, and for a family was $40,288. Males had a median income of $27,045 versus $21,734 for females. The per capita income for the county was $15,210. About 12.00% of families and 15.40% of the population were below the poverty line, including 19.80% of those under age 18 and 15.60% of those age 65 or over.

== Communities ==
=== Cities ===
- Castroville
- Devine
- Hondo (county seat)
- LaCoste
- Lytle (mostly in Atascosa County and a small part in Bexar County)
- Natalia
- San Antonio (mostly in Bexar County and a small part in Comal County)

=== Census-designated places ===
- D'Hanis
- Lake Medina Shores (partly in Bandera County)
- Yancey

=== Unincorporated communities ===
- Dunlay
- Mico
- Pearson
- Rio Medina

=== Ghost towns ===
- New Fountain
- Quihi

== Education ==
School districts include:

- D'Hanis Independent School District
- Devine Independent School District
- Hondo Independent School District
- Lytle Independent School District
- Medina Valley Independent School District
- Natalia Independent School District
- Northside Independent School District
- Utopia Independent School District

The designated community college is Southwest Texas Junior College.

== Gallery ==
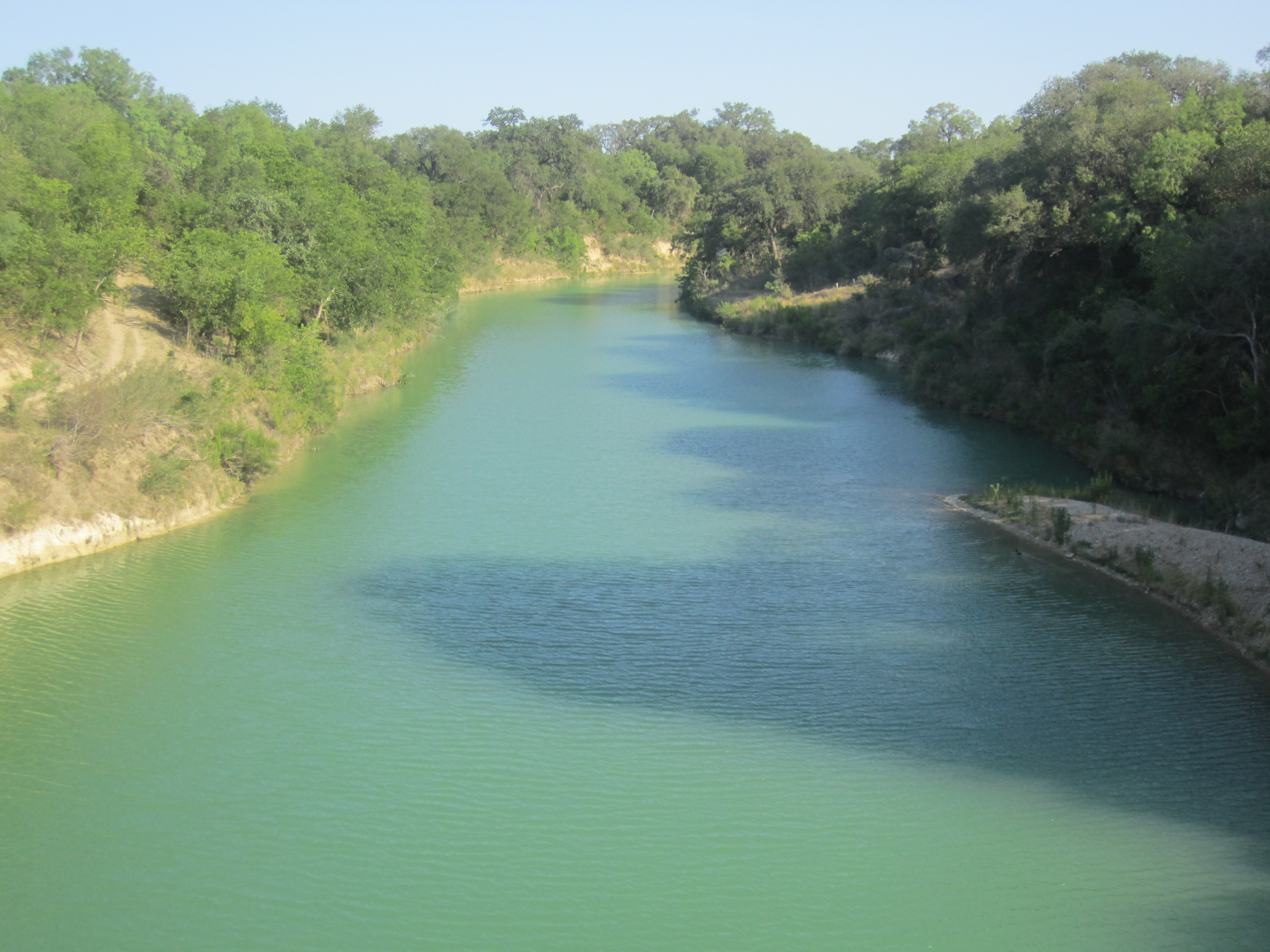
Hondo Creek is located south of Hondo.

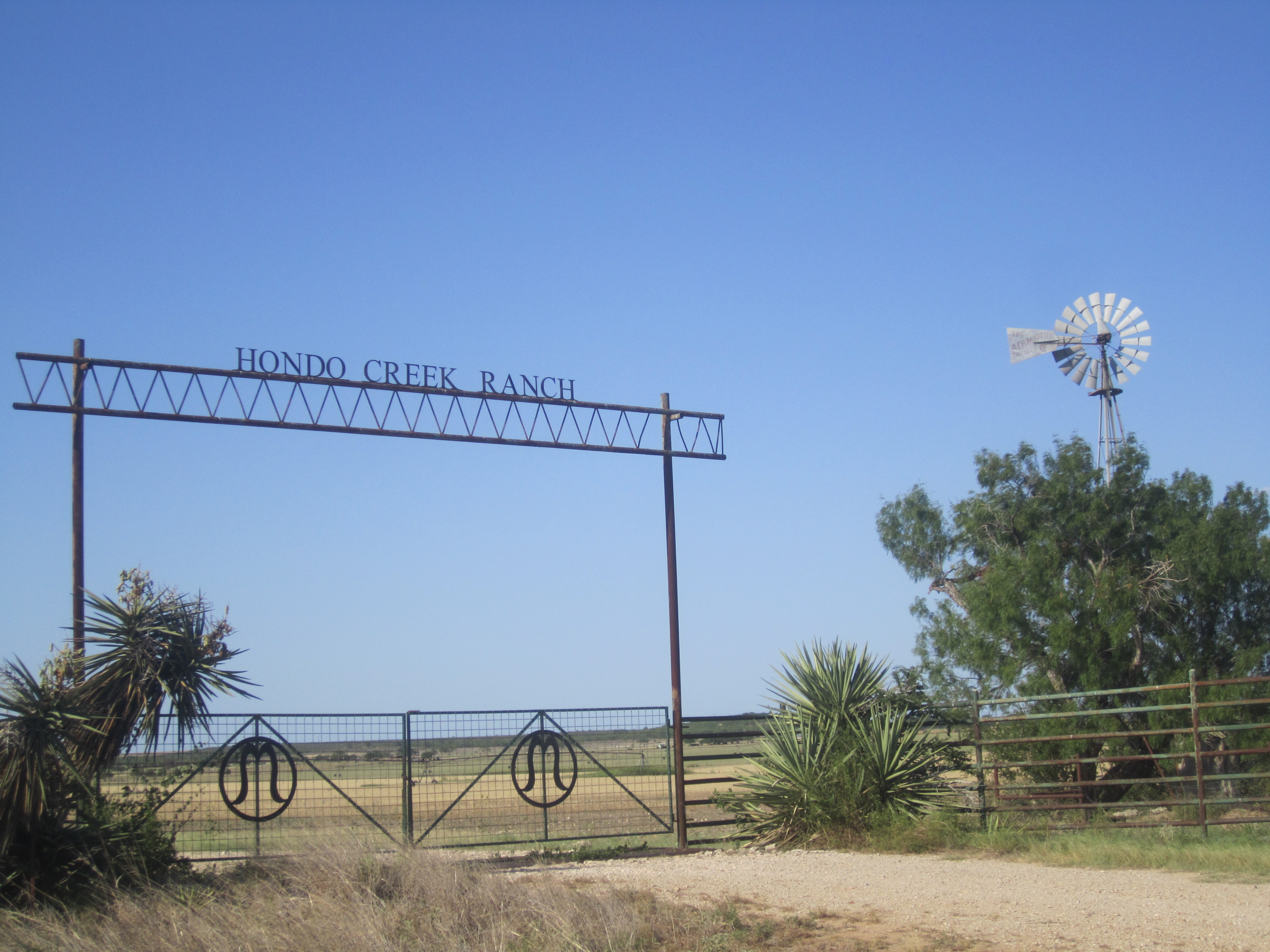
Entrance to Hondo Creek Ranch

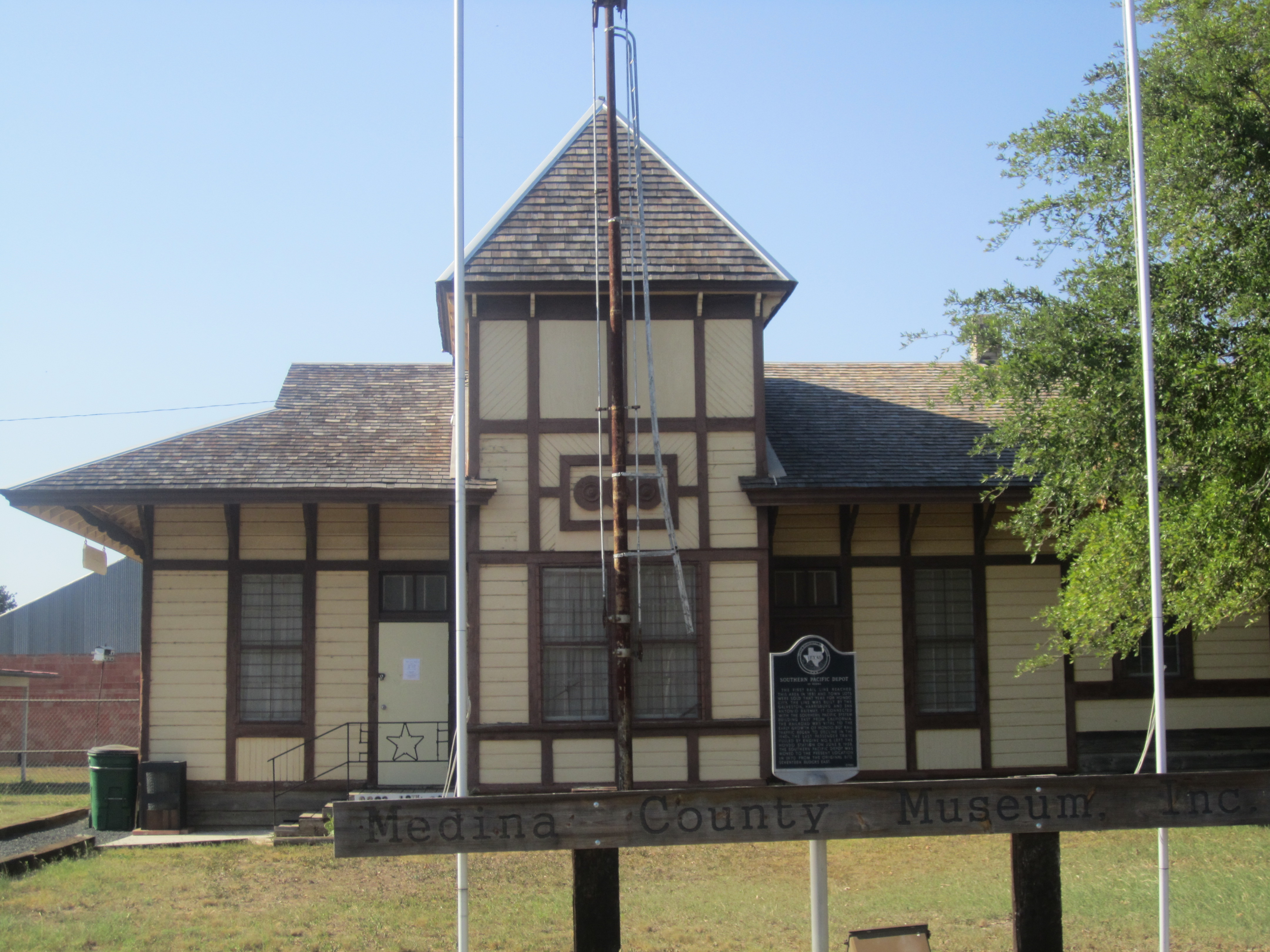
The Medina County Museum is located off U.S. Route 90 in Hondo.

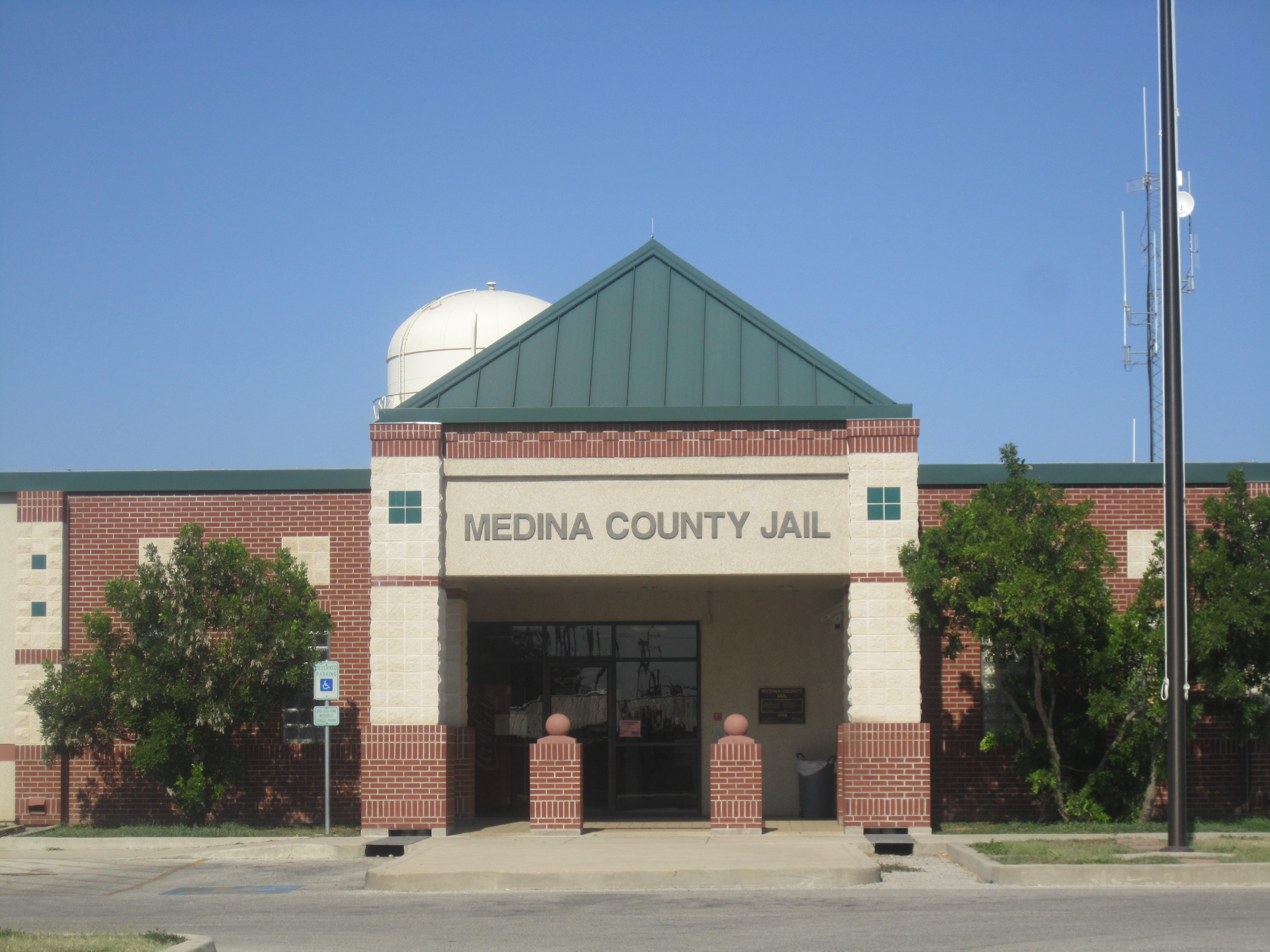
The Medina County Jail

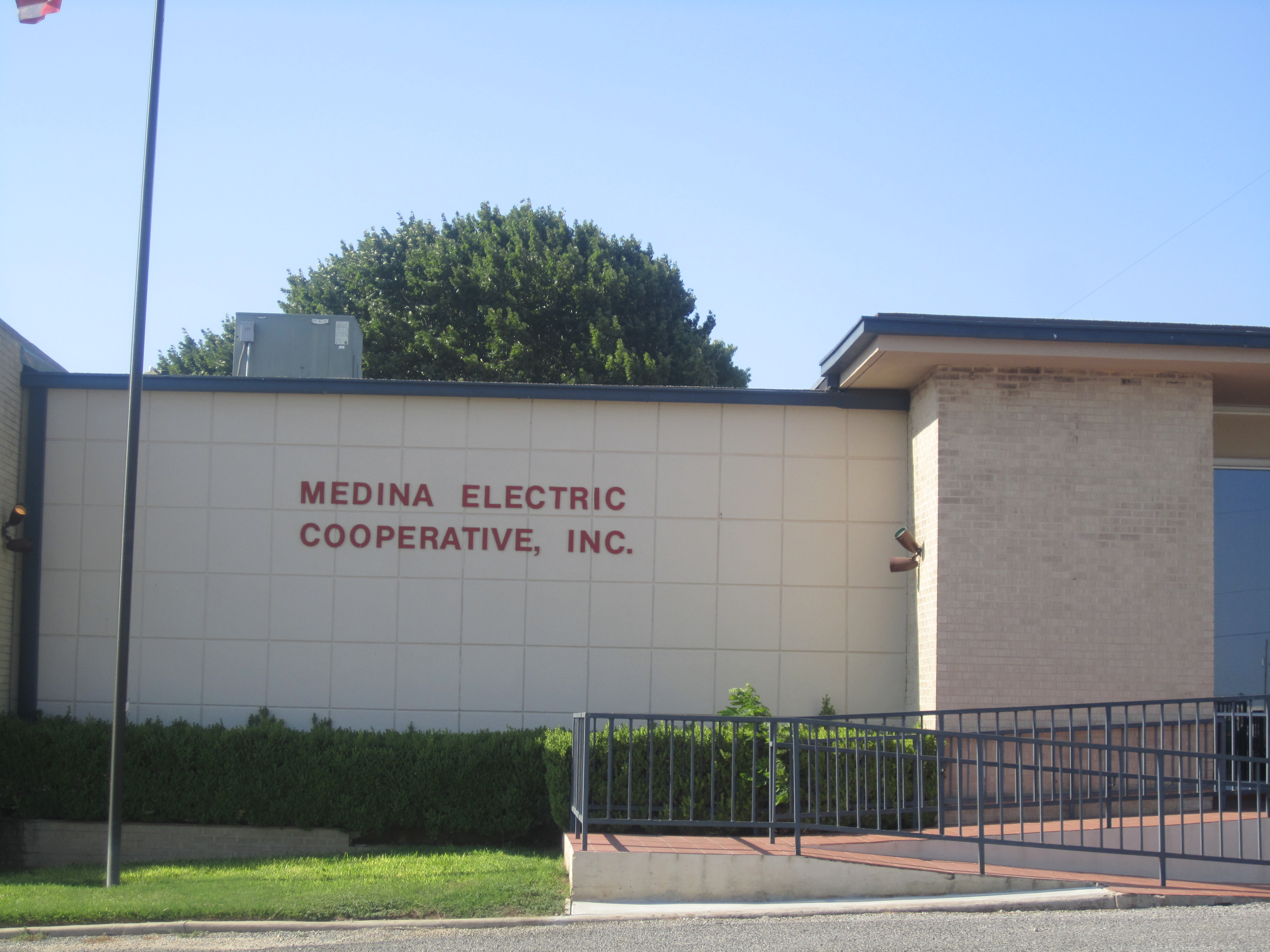
Medina Electric Cooperative in Hondo

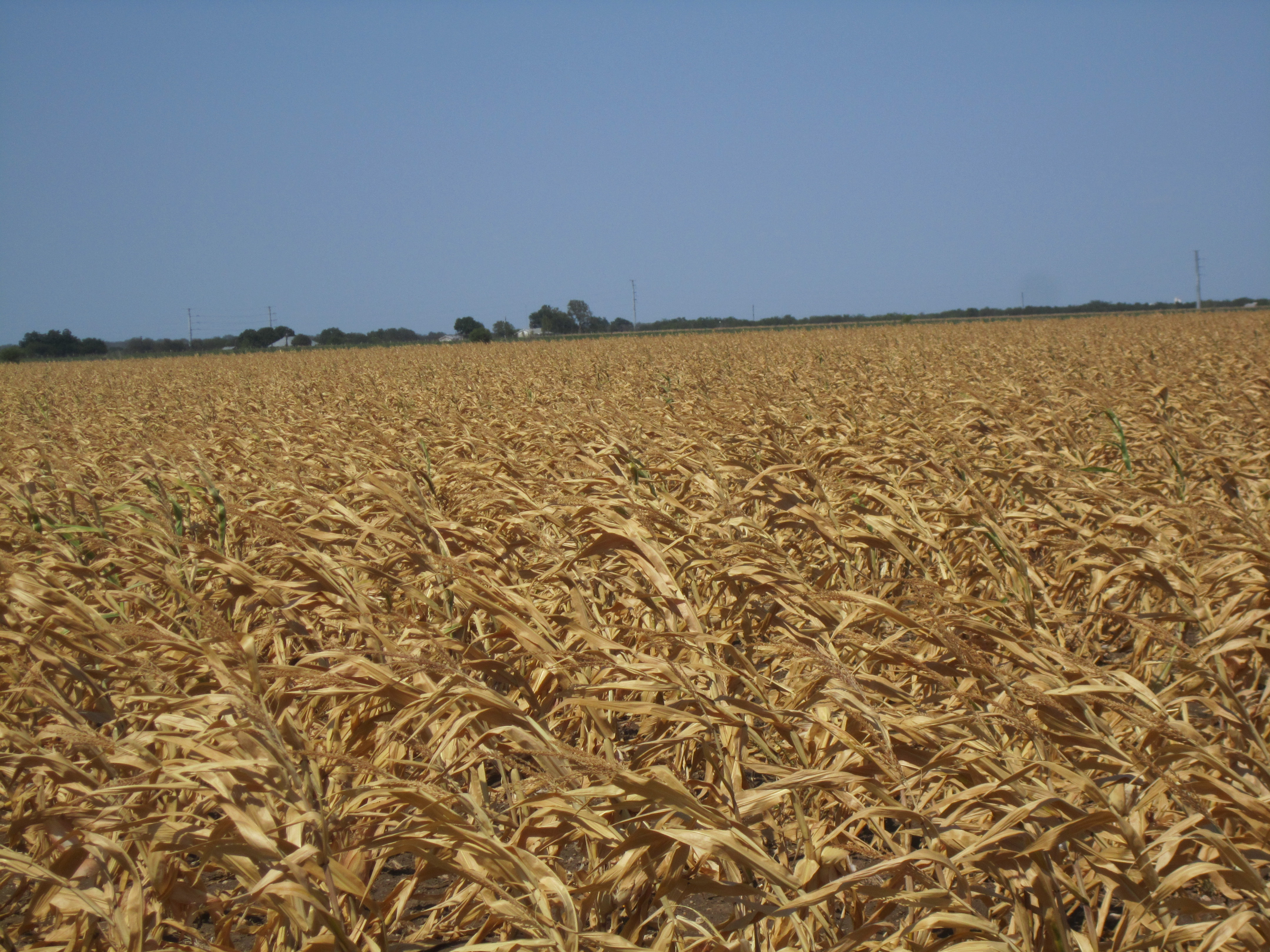
Scorched cornfield in Castroville

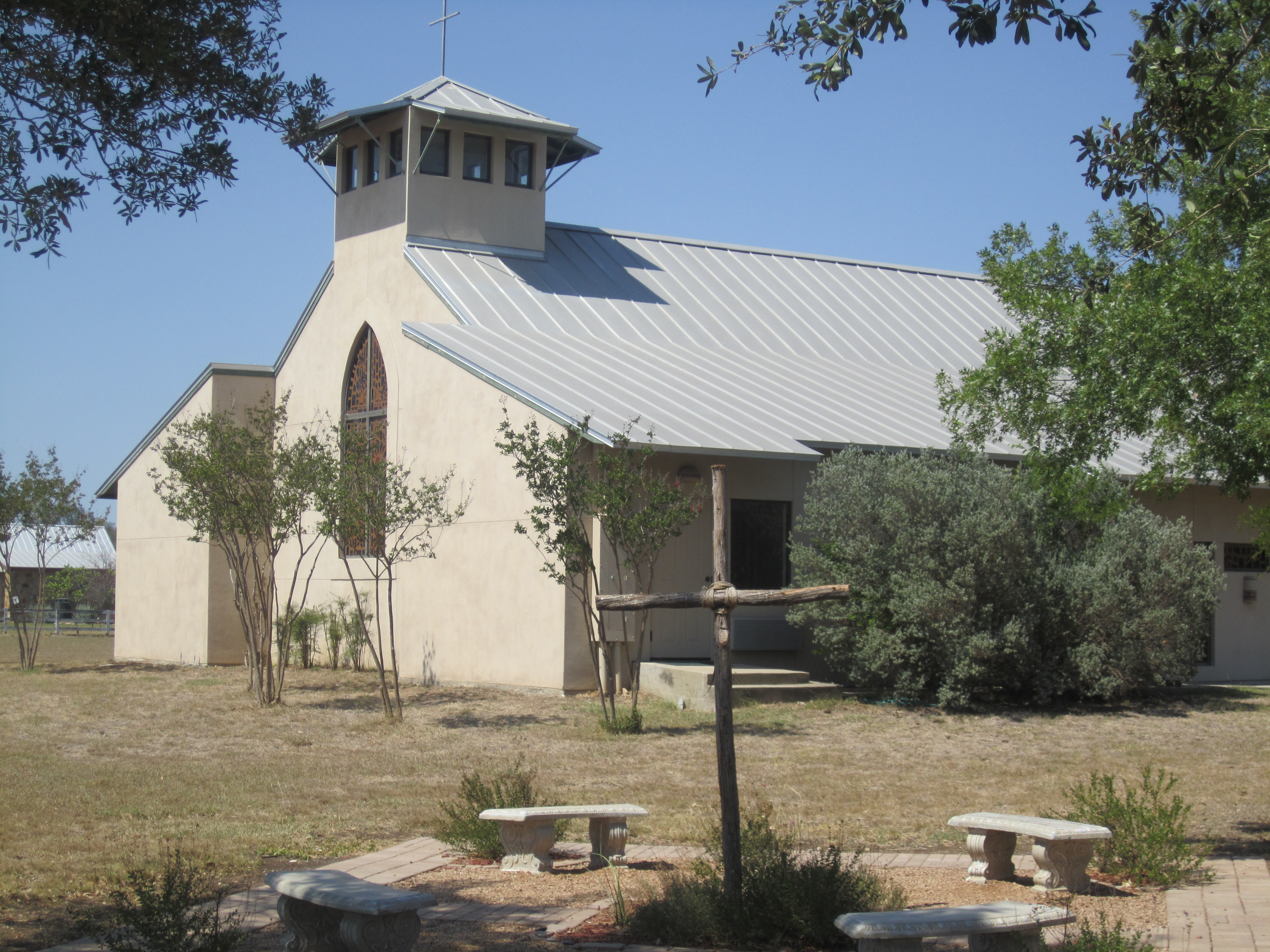
Medina Valley United Methodist Church in Castroville

== Politics ==
United States presidential election results for Medina County, Texas
| Year | Republican | | Democratic | | Third party(ies) | |
| Year | No. | % | No. | % | No. | % |
|---|---|---|---|---|---|---|
| 1912 | 219 | 18.85% | 648 | 55.77% | 295 | 25.39% |
| 1916 | 650 | 45.11% | 758 | 52.60% | 33 | 2.29% |
| 1920 | 772 | 45.71% | 519 | 30.73% | 398 | 23.56% |
| 1924 | 816 | 35.81% | 986 | 43.26% | 477 | 20.93% |
| 1928 | 1,243 | 46.94% | 1,400 | 52.87% | 5 | 0.19% |
| 1932 | 515 | 16.96% | 2,516 | 82.87% | 5 | 0.16% |
| 1936 | 969 | 31.97% | 2,050 | 67.63% | 12 | 0.40% |
| 1940 | 1,480 | 45.83% | 1,749 | 54.17% | 0 | 0.00% |
| 1944 | 1,607 | 47.42% | 1,469 | 43.35% | 313 | 9.24% |
| 1948 | 1,492 | 42.39% | 1,875 | 53.27% | 153 | 4.35% |
| 1952 | 3,204 | 63.52% | 1,840 | 36.48% | 0 | 0.00% |
| 1956 | 2,668 | 63.51% | 1,516 | 36.09% | 17 | 0.40% |
| 1960 | 2,028 | 46.43% | 2,325 | 53.23% | 15 | 0.34% |
| 1964 | 1,583 | 31.71% | 3,408 | 68.27% | 1 | 0.02% |
| 1968 | 2,058 | 39.19% | 2,471 | 47.06% | 722 | 13.75% |
| 1972 | 4,059 | 71.85% | 1,507 | 26.68% | 83 | 1.47% |
| 1976 | 3,252 | 46.54% | 3,681 | 52.68% | 55 | 0.79% |
| 1980 | 4,742 | 60.12% | 3,034 | 38.46% | 112 | 1.42% |
| 1984 | 5,737 | 65.17% | 3,053 | 34.68% | 13 | 0.15% |
| 1988 | 5,722 | 57.05% | 4,227 | 42.15% | 80 | 0.80% |
| 1992 | 4,912 | 45.54% | 3,650 | 33.84% | 2,223 | 20.61% |
| 1996 | 5,710 | 55.03% | 3,880 | 37.39% | 787 | 7.58% |
| 2000 | 8,590 | 66.73% | 4,025 | 31.27% | 258 | 2.00% |
| 2004 | 10,389 | 70.07% | 4,322 | 29.15% | 115 | 0.78% |
| 2008 | 10,480 | 66.59% | 5,147 | 32.71% | 110 | 0.70% |
| 2012 | 11,079 | 69.03% | 4,784 | 29.81% | 186 | 1.16% |
| 2016 | 12,085 | 70.07% | 4,634 | 26.87% | 527 | 3.06% |
| 2020 | 15,642 | 69.04% | 6,773 | 29.89% | 242 | 1.07% |
| 2024 | 17,464 | 70.94% | 6,950 | 28.23% | 203 | 0.82% |

United States Senate election results for Medina County, Texas1
| Year | Republican | | Democratic | | Third party(ies) | |
| Year | No. | % | No. | % | No. | % |
|---|---|---|---|---|---|---|
| 2024 | 16,508 | 67.50% | 7,416 | 30.32% | 533 | 2.18% |

United States Senate election results for Medina County, Texas2
| Year | Republican | | Democratic | | Third party(ies) | |
| Year | No. | % | No. | % | No. | % |
|---|---|---|---|---|---|---|
| 2020 | 15,594 | 70.21% | 6,207 | 27.94% | 411 | 1.85% |

Texas Gubernatorial election results for Medina County
| Year | Republican | | Democratic | | Third party(ies) | |
| Year | No. | % | No. | % | No. | % |
|---|---|---|---|---|---|---|
| 2022 | 12,601 | 72.56% | 4,591 | 26.44% | 174 | 1.00% |

== See also ==
- National Register of Historic Places listings in Medina County, Texas
- Recorded Texas Historic Landmarks in Medina County
