= Natalia, Texas =

City in Medina County, Texas, United States

- City
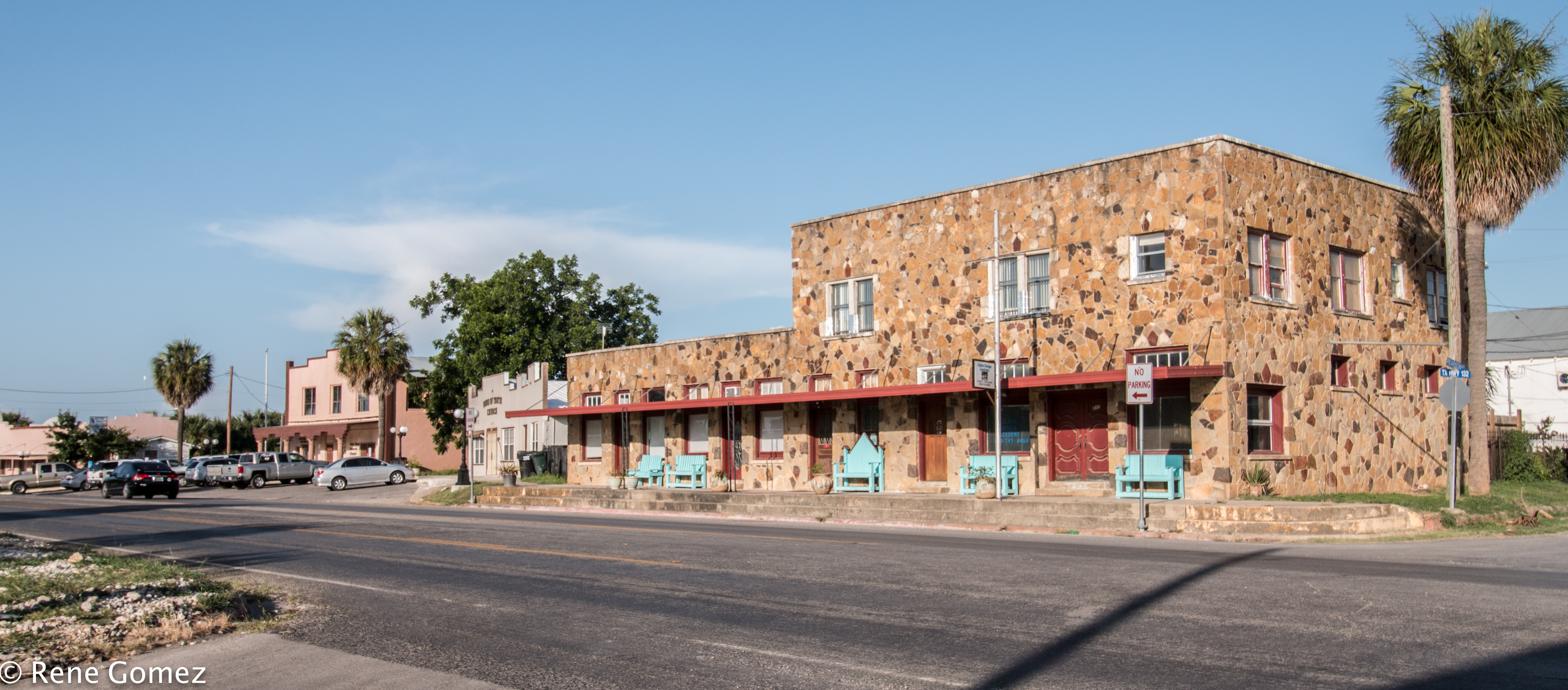
- SH 132 in Natalia, June 2016

- Location within Medina County
- Coordinates: 29°11′16″N 98°51′08″W
- Country: United States
- State: Texas
- County: Medina
- Founded: 1912
- Incorporated: 1968

Government
  - Mayor: Tommy F. Ortiz

Area
  - Total: 1.393 sq mi (3.608 km^{2})
  - Land: 1.391 sq mi (3.602 km^{2})
  - Water: 0.0015 sq mi (0.004 km^{2})
- Elevation: 748 ft (228 m)

Population (2020)
  - Total: 1,202
  - Estimate (2022): 1,307
  - Density: 940/sq mi (362.9/km^{2})
- Time zone: UTC–6 (Central (CST))
  - Summer (DST): UTC–5 (CDT)
- ZIP Code: 78059
- Area code: 830
- FIPS code: 48-50400
- GNIS feature ID: 2411215
- Website: cityofnatalia.com

Natalia is a city in Medina County, Texas, United States. The population was 1,202 at the 2020 census. It was founded in 1912 and was named after Natalie Pearson Nicholson, daughter of Frederick Stark Pearson, an engineer, designer and builder of the Medina Dam.

Natalia is part of the San Antonio metropolitan area.

== Geography ==
Natalia is located approximately 30 mi (48 km) southwest of Downtown San Antonio in Medina County.

According to the United States Census Bureau, the city has a total area of 1.391 square miles (3.60 km^{2}), is land and 0.002 square miles (0.01 km^{2}), is water.

Natalia is located on State Highway 132 and is adjacent to Interstate 35.

== Climate ==
The climate in this area is characterized by hot, humid summers and generally mild to cool winters. According to the Köppen Climate Classification system, Natalia has a humid subtropical climate, abbreviated "Cfa" on climate maps.

== Demographics ==
Historical population
Census	Pop.	Note	%±
1960	1,154		—
1970	1,296		12.3%
1980	1,264		−2.5%
1990	1,216		−3.8%
2000	1,663		36.8%
2010	1,431		−14.0%
2020	1,202		−16.0%
2022 (est.)	1,307		8.7%
U.S. Decennial Census; 2020 Census

=== 2020 census ===
As of the 2020 census, Natalia had a population of 1,202 and 298 families residing in the city. The median age was 36.9 years. 26.0% of residents were under the age of 18 and 16.2% of residents were 65 years of age or older. For every 100 females there were 89.9 males, and for every 100 females age 18 and over there were 91.2 males age 18 and over.

0.0% of residents lived in urban areas, while 100.0% lived in rural areas.

There were 416 households in Natalia, of which 37.3% had children under the age of 18 living in them. Of all households, 37.7% were married-couple households, 19.5% were households with a male householder and no spouse or partner present, and 35.3% were households with a female householder and no spouse or partner present. About 21.1% of all households were made up of individuals and 10.4% had someone living alone who was 65 years of age or older.

There were 499 housing units, of which 16.6% were vacant. The homeowner vacancy rate was 2.2% and the rental vacancy rate was 10.5%.

Racial composition as of the 2020 census
Race	Number	Percent
White	538	44.8%
Black or African American	9	0.7%
American Indian and Alaska Native	10	0.8%
Asian	3	0.2%
Native Hawaiian and Other Pacific Islander	2	0.2%
Some other race	307	25.5%
Two or more races	333	27.7%
Hispanic or Latino (of any race)	1,034	86.0%

=== 2000 census ===
As of the 2000 census, there were 1,663 people, 513 households, and 397 families residing in the city. The population density was 1,630.4 inhabitants per square mile (629.5/km^{2}). There were 584 housing units at an average density of 572.5 per square mile (221.0/km^{2}). The racial makeup of the city was 65.54% White, 1.14% African American, 0.42% Native American, 0.18% Asian, 0.12% Pacific Islander, 29.28% from other races, and 3.31% from two or more races. Hispanic or Latino of any race were 79.43% of the population.

There were 513 households, out of which 44.2% had children under the age of 18 living with them, 54.0% were married couples living together, 18.9% had a female householder with no husband present, and 22.6% were non-families. 19.3% of all households were made up of individuals, and 8.6% had someone living alone who was 65 years of age or older. The average household size was 3.24 and the average family size was 3.73.

In the city, the population was spread out, with 36.3% under the age of 18, 8.4% from 18 to 24, 28.8% from 25 to 44, 16.4% from 45 to 64, and 10.2% who were 65 years of age or older. The median age was 29 years. For every 100 females, there were 99.4 males. For every 100 females age 18 and over, there were 90.0 males.

The median income for a household in the city was $22,557, and the median income for a family was $25,690. Males had a median income of $19,943 versus $16,484 for females. The per capita income for the city was $8,583. About 27.2% of families and 33.4% of the population were below the poverty line, including 42.7% of those under age 18 and 24.6% of those age 65 or over.

== Education ==
Natalia is served by the Natalia Independent School District.

== See also ==
- List of municipalities in Texas
