= Medina Lake =

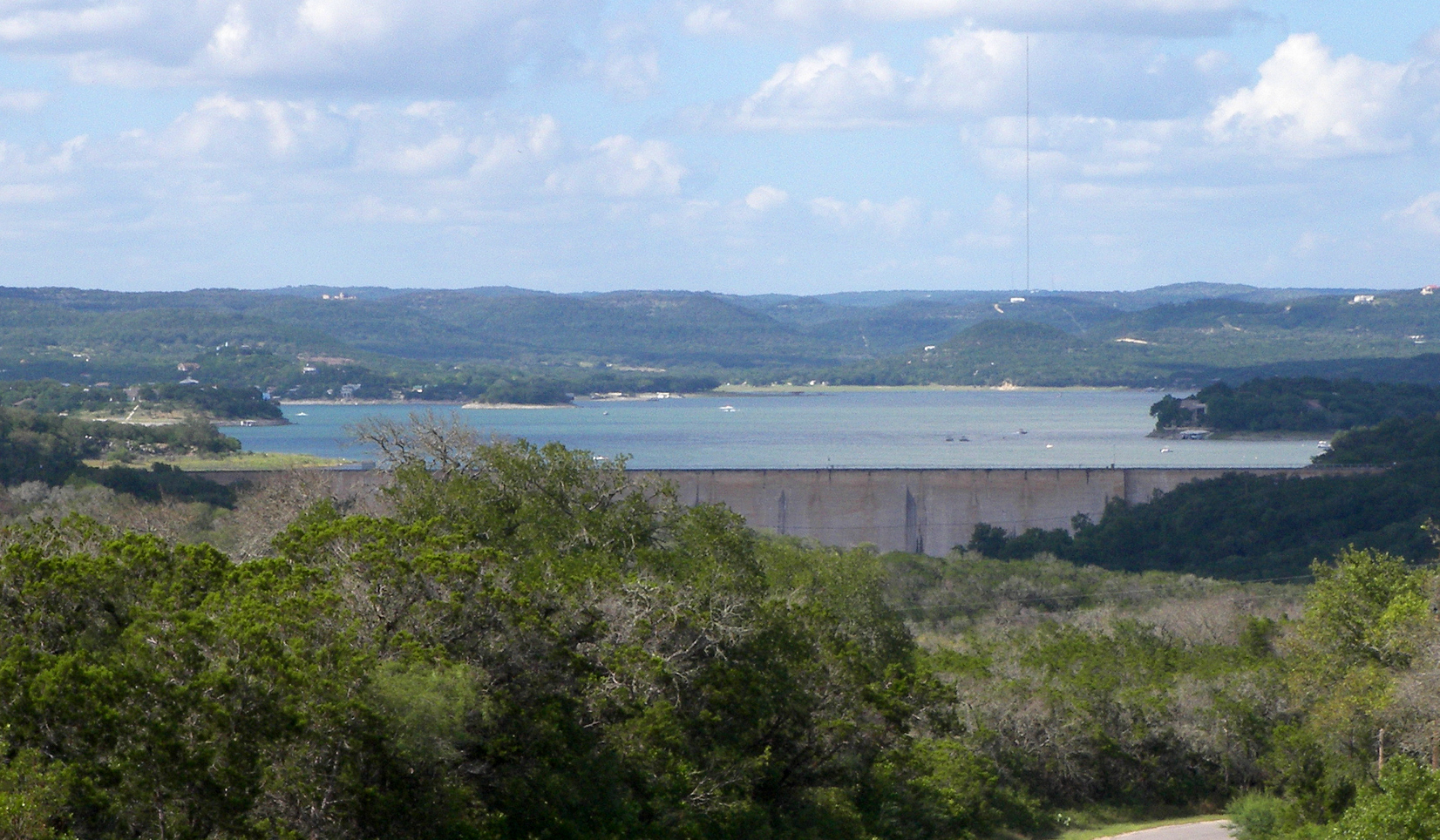
- Medina Lake in 2010

- Location within Texas Location within the United States

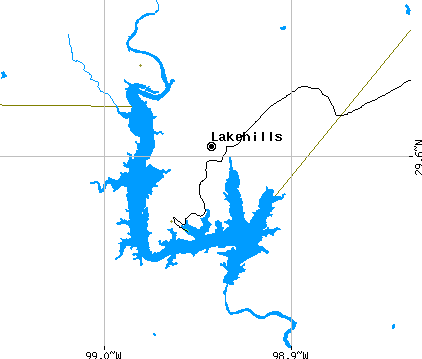
- Map
- Location: Bandera / Medina counties, Texas, US
- Coordinates: 29°32′25″N 98°56′01″W
- Lake type: Agricultural reservoir
- Primary inflows: Medina River
- Primary outflows: Medina River
- Basin countries: United States
- Surface area: 6,060 acres (2,450 ha)
- Max. depth: 152 ft (46 m)
- Shore length^{1}: 110 mi (180 km)
- Surface elevation: 1,062 ft (324 m)
- ^{1} Shore length is not a well-defined measure.

Medina Lake is a reservoir on the Medina River in the Texas Hill Country of the United States. It is operated by the Bexar/Medina/Atascosa County Agricultural District. Medina Dam was completed in 1913 in a privately financed project, creating the lake to supply irrigation water for local agricultural use. Lake Medina is in northeastern Medina County and southeastern Bandera County, about 40 miles (64 km) northwest of San Antonio.

It is a crescent-shaped reservoir running west to east. It is 18 miles (29 km) long and 3 miles (5 km) wide at its broadest point. It is contained by the Medina Dam at the lake's south end. At the time of the dam's construction, it was the largest concrete dam in the country and the fourth largest dam overall. The dam is listed on the National Register of Historic Places.

The lake is fed by and discharges back into the Medina River, and serves both recreational and irrigation uses. Communities located along the lake are Mico, Lake Medina Shores and Lakehills.

== Fish populations ==
Medina Lake has been stocked with species of fish intended to improve the reservoir for recreational fishing. Fish in Medina Lake include largemouth bass, white bass, hybrid striped bass, catfish, and carp. Due to drought conditions lasting up until July 2015, recreational fish species had disappeared. Plans to restock the lake once levels reach viable levels were put in place. These plans were realized when the lake did reach these levels, which as of October 2, 2016, was 96.6% full.

== Future and state of the lake ==
As part of the 2010–13 Southern United States drought, the lake water levels dropped below 5% capacity. Many cracks, oil drums and a Jeep were visible as a result of low water. Only one public boat ramp remained, located at Red Cove in Mico. A few showers in the Summer of 2013 helped the lake rise to 5.2%, but the dam was reopened in September as many people in the South Side of San Antonio use the lake for a water source. Many businesses have closed in the area, many residents have left and Lakehills has become somewhat of a ghost town.

Heavy rainfall in the region as of May 2015 brought the levels above 46% capacity. At that time, Medina Lake was about 28 feet low, down from 90 feet low mere months before. Due to heavy rains on the Medina River basin and the lake itself in May 2016, Medina Lake was 100% full and 1.5 feet above its conservation pool as of June 1, 2016. As of July 2024, the last time the lake was considered to be at full capacity was on July 7, 2019.

Since then, the lake levels have begun to decline once again. As of July 2023, Medina Lake was the lowest it’s been since 2015, only being filled to about 5% capacity, compared to 12% capacity in 2022. This is due to constant drought and irrigation as many experts claim it may take years of rain to replenish the reservoir. Due to declining lake levels, many area farmers have to turned to using groundwater for irrigation. In June 2024, Medina Lake had dropped down to 2.4% capacity, with Lakehills and the surrounding areas suffering an economic depression as a result along with depreciated home values and a rise in homelessness. In May 2025, the lake dropped to a record low 2% capacity. The July 2025 Central Texas floods brought the levels up to 5%, but as of February 2026 the levels have slowly dropped back down to 4%.
