= D'Hanis Independent School District =

School district in Texas, United States

D'Hanis Independent School District is a public school district based in the community of D'Hanis, Texas (USA).

The district has one school that serves students in grades pre-kindergarten through twelve.

In 2009, the school district was rated "academically acceptable" by the Texas Education Agency.
