= Medina Valley Independent School District =

School district in Texas, United States

Address
- 8449 FM 471 South Castroville, Texas, 78009; United States

District information
- Type: Public School District
- Grades: Pre-K - 12
- Superintendent: Dr. Scott Caloss
- Governing agency: Texas Education Agency
- Schools: Elementary - 6 Middle - 2 High - 2

Students and staff
- Students: 8,700 (2023-2024)
- Teachers: 539.57 (2023-2024) FTE
- Staff: 523.83 (2023-2024) FTE
- Student–teacher ratio: 16:1
- Athletic conference: UIL Class AAAAAA

Other information
- Education Service Center: Region 20
- Website: http://www.mvisd.com

Medina Valley Independent School District is a public school district based in Castroville, Texas.

In addition to Castroville, the district also serves the city of LaCoste and the surrounding area. Primarily located in Medina County, a small portion of the district extends into Bexar County.

In 2022, the school district was rated "A" by the Texas Education Agency.

== History ==
For the 1998-1999 school year, Medina Valley ISD had four schools: Medina Valley High School (grades 9-12), Medina Valley Junior High (7-8), Medina Valley Intermediate (4-6), and Medina Valley Elementary (PK-3).

In 2000, Medina Valley Middle School (6-8) and Medina Valley Early Childhood Center (PK-K) open. MVJH closes. The district undergoes a grade reconfiguration at MVIS (4-5) and MVES (1-3).

In 2004, LaCoste Elementary opens. MVES is renamed Castroville Elementary.

In 2005, Potranco Elementary opens. MVECC closes. The elementary schools are all reconfigured to host grades PK-5.

== Schools ==
High schools (grades 9-12)
| Name | Mascot | Colors | Established | Location | Additional information |
|---|---|---|---|---|---|
| Medina Valley High School | Panthers | Orange & Black | 1960 | Castroville | |
| Creek View High School | Cougars | Baby Blue & Black | 2026 | San Antonio | Opened with grades 9-11 and will transition to 9-12 in year 2. |

Middle schools (grades 6-8)
| Name | Mascot | Colors | Established | Location | Additional information |
|---|---|---|---|---|---|
| Medina Valley Middle School | Wildcats | Orangel & Gray | 2000 | Castroville | |
| Loma Alta Middle School | Wildcats | Dark Blue & Orangle | 2018 | San Antonio | |

Elementary schools (grades PK-5)
| Name | Mascot | Colors | Established | Location | Additional information |
|---|---|---|---|---|---|
| Castroville Elementary | Cubs | Orange & Red | | Castroville | Formerly Medina Valley Elementary School until 2004 |
| LaCoste Elementary | Cubs | Orange & Red | 2004 | LaCoste | |
| Ladera Elementary | Cubs | Orange & Red | 2021 | San Antonio | |
| Luckey Ranch Elementary | Cubs | Orange & Red | 2018 | San Antonio | |
| Potranco Elementary | Cubs | Orange & Red | 2005 | San Antonio | |
| Silos Elementary | Cubs | Orange & Red | 2024 | San Antonio | |

Future schools
| Name | Expected opening | Location | Additional information |
|---|---|---|---|
| Medina Valley MS #3 | 2027 | San Antonio | Naming process underway in Fall 2027 |
| Elementary #7 | TBA | TBD | |
| Elementary #8 | TBA | TBD | |
