= Mico, Texas =

Unincorporated community in Texas, US

Coordinates: 29°32′39″N 98°55′23″W

Mico is an unincorporated community in northeastern Medina County, Texas, United States. It is approximately 40 miles (64 km) west of Downtown San Antonio off Farm to Market Road 1283. The community is part of the San Antonio Metropolitan Statistical Area (MSA). Its zip code is 78056.

The Medina Irrigation Company (MICO) originally built much of the community as a workers camp, to house the approximately 1500 Mexican laborers (and their families) who constructed Medina Dam. It was the fourth largest dam in the United States at its completion in 1913. The dam has been listed on the National Register of Historic Places.

The dam created Lake Medina, a reservoir to supply water for irrigation of an estimated 60,000 acres (240 km^{2}). The company was founded by Dr. Frederick Stark Pearson, an engineer and developer who designed the dam and raised private project funding, chiefly by the sale of subscriptions to British investors. The outbreak of World War I cut off the flow of capital for sale of farmland dependent on the project. Pearson's company went into receivership in 1914 and was sold finally at public auction in 1924. Today the dam and lake are operated by a local water authority.

The town was first named MICO, spelled in capital letters after the company's acronym. The town was renamed Medina Lake in 1916, but reverted to the name Mico in 1923.

Today, Mico has a Volunteer City Council Manager, and operates a Volunteer Fire Department. Tourists can enjoy entertainment by visiting local bars.
