= Medina Dam =

- U.S. National Register of Historic Places
- Texas State Antiquities Landmark
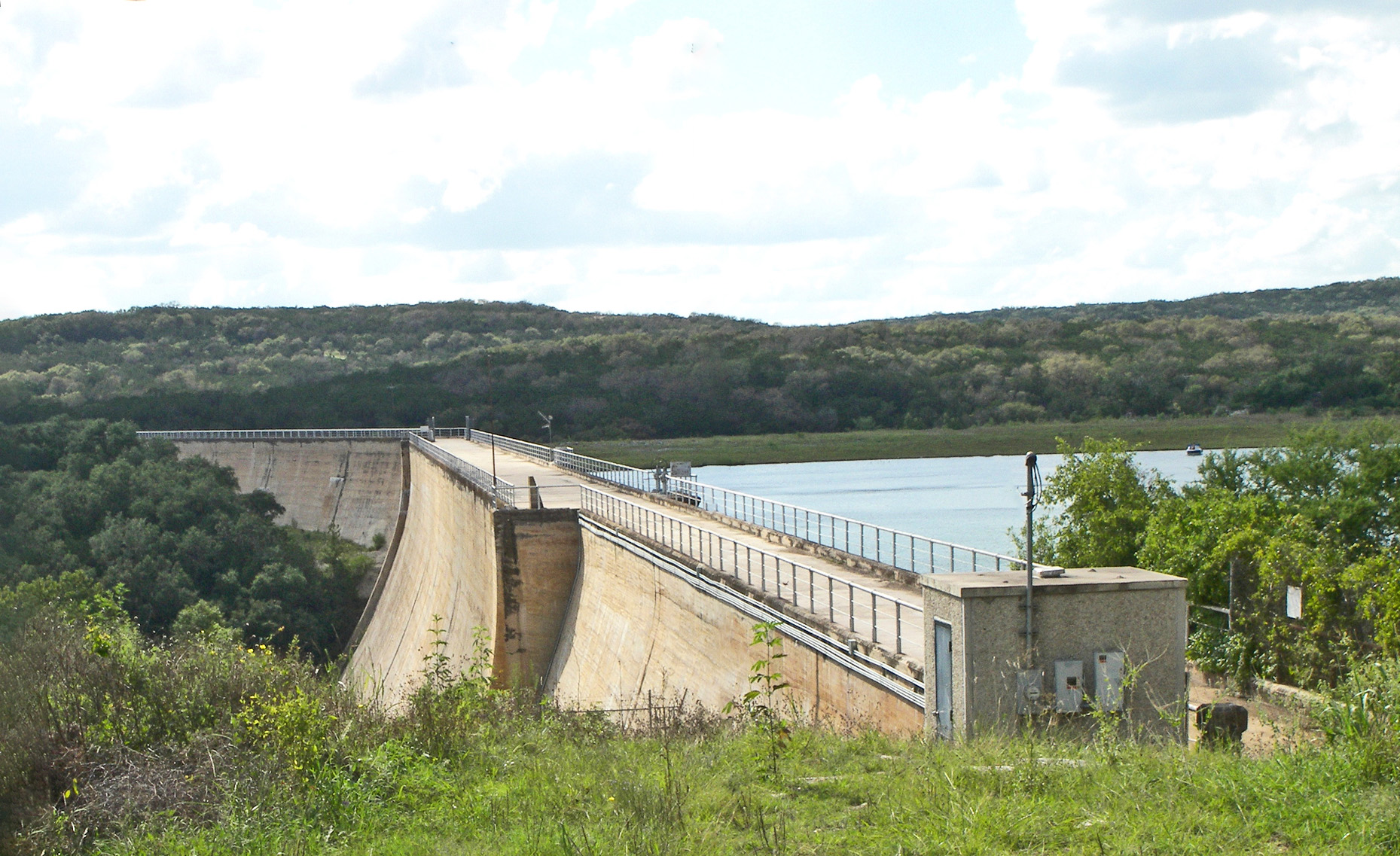
- Medina Dam in 2010

- Location within Texas Location within the United States
- Nearest city: Castroville, Texas
- Coordinates: 29°32′25″N 98°56′2″W
- Area: 4.1 acres (1.7 ha)
- Built: 1911
- Built by: Fred Stark Pearson
- NRHP reference No.: 76002050
- TSAL No.: 468

Significant dates
- Added to NRHP: March 15, 1976
- Designated TSAL: May 28, 1981

The Medina Dam is a hollow-masonry type dam built in 1911 and 1912 by the Medina Irrigation Company in what became Mico, Texas, USA. Medina Lake extends north of it in northeastern Medina County and southeastern Bandera County. The dam and irrigation project was designed and financed by Dr. Frederick Stark Pearson, an American engineer, with extensive British financial backing. The construction took over 1500 men two years to build while working 24 hours a day. They were mostly skilled Mexican workers with experience building other dams for Pearson. They received two dollars for a day's work, which were good wages for the time. Pearson's Medina Irrigation Company (MICO) built a camp to house the workers and their families; the company town was first called MICO after its acronym. The community is now known as Mico, Texas.

When the dam was completed in 1913, it was the largest hydraulic engineering project west of the Mississippi River and the fourth-largest dam in the US. It is listed on the National Register of Historic Places for its significance as an infrastructure project and its contributions to economic development of the county. Author of Ripples from Medina Lake, Rev. Cyril M. Kuehne claims a total of 70 lives were taken during the dam's construction, however, he only managed to locate 27 death certificates. Dr. Oscar B. Taylor, dentist of near-by settlement Hondo, Texas, was quoted by Kuehne as saying "sixty-six [unmarked] graves" were counted at a cemetery 3 miles away.

The dam contains over 292,000 cubic yards (223,000 m³) of concrete and measures 164 feet high by 128 feet (39 m) wide at the base by 1,580 feet (482 m) long. It is 25 feet (8 m) wide at the top, which is 1076.2 feet (328 m) above sea level, and the spillway is 1,064.2 feet (324 m) above sea level. The dam provides irrigation to over 34,000 acres (138 km²) to Blackland Prairie farmlands below the Balcones Escarpment around Castroville, Texas, and also supplies water to the Medina River Ultrafiltration Water Treatment Plant owned and operated by the San Antonio Water System.

The reservoir behind the dam is called Medina Lake and is a major recreation area. It discharges into the Medina River, which also contains a diversion dam four miles downstream.

The dam was featured in the 1919 serial The Masked Rider.

Medina Dam was once a publicly accessible, one-lane roadway that connected to County Road 260. In 1980, vehicle traffic was closed and rerouted to a new road known as County Road 264; although temporary use of the dam as a road continued in 1990.

== Historical State Markers on the Dam ==
Located on the dam are three state-placed historical markers. These markers are currently inaccessible to the public after foot traffic was disallowed following the September 11 attacks in response to terrorism concerns.

=== 1936 Mountain Valley marker ===
The earliest of the three markers is a 1936 state marker that acknowledges the previous Mormon settlement, Mountain Valley that was built in 1854 and was destroyed in 1913 during construction of the dam. The Mormon settlement Mountain Valley is now located underneath Medina Lake.

"Established in 1854 by 16 families of Mormons under the leadership of Lyman Wight (1796-1858). They abandoned their homes and mills in 1858 as the result of Indian depredations. Their lands are now beneath the waters of Medina Lake. Erected by the State of Texas - 1936."

=== 1978 Texas Historical Commission Marker ===
The next is a marker placed in 1978 by the Texas Historical Commission that designated the dam as a state historical landmark.

"Henri Castro, who colonized this area in the 1840s, envisioned irrigated farms along the Medina River. The project was delayed, however, until after the turn of the century, when Dr. Fred Stark Pearson, an internationally known engineer, persuaded British investors to finance construction of a dam at this site. Completed in 1912, Medina Dam was hailed as the largest in Texas and the fourth largest in the United States. Limestone boulders from a nearby quarry added bulk to the massive concrete structure. Four miles downstream, a small diversion dam conducted water into a system of irrigation canals. Gravitational force delivered the water to fields. The outbreak of World War I (1914) disrupted ties with British investors. Seeking new capital, Dr. Pearson and his wife left for England in 1915 on the "Lusitania" and were killed when a German submarine torpedoed the ship. The irrigation network created by Medina Dam brought new prosperity to this region. Vegetables raised in irrigated fields became a valuable crop. Water and electricity were made available to rural residents. In 1925 voters established the Bexar-Medine-Atascosa Counties Water Improvement District No. 1 to manage the project. 1978."

=== 1991 Texas Historic Civil Engineering Marker ===
Placed in 1991, a marker declared the dam a Texas Historic Civil Engineering Landmark.

== Reopening of the Dam ==
The Medina Lake Preservation Society is undertaking efforts to get the dam reopened to the public, or to at least have the historical markers moved so people can see them.

== See also ==
- National Register of Historic Places listings in Medina County, Texas
- Medina Valley
- Edwards Plateau
- Texas Hill Country
