= Barcelona Traction =

Utility/transport company in Catalonia

Barcelona Traction, Light and Power Company, Limited
- Native name: La canadiense (in Spanish), La canadenca (in Catalan)
- Type: Limited
- Industry: Electric utility; Public transport; Civil engineering
- Founded: 12 September 1911
- Founder: Frederick Stark Pearson
- Defunct: 16 December 1980
- Fate: Acquired by FECSA
- Headquarters: Toronto, Ontario, Canada
- Area served: Spain
- Key people: E. R. Peacock, Chairman; Dannie Heineman, Engineer; Juan March, Shareholder
- Services: Tram service

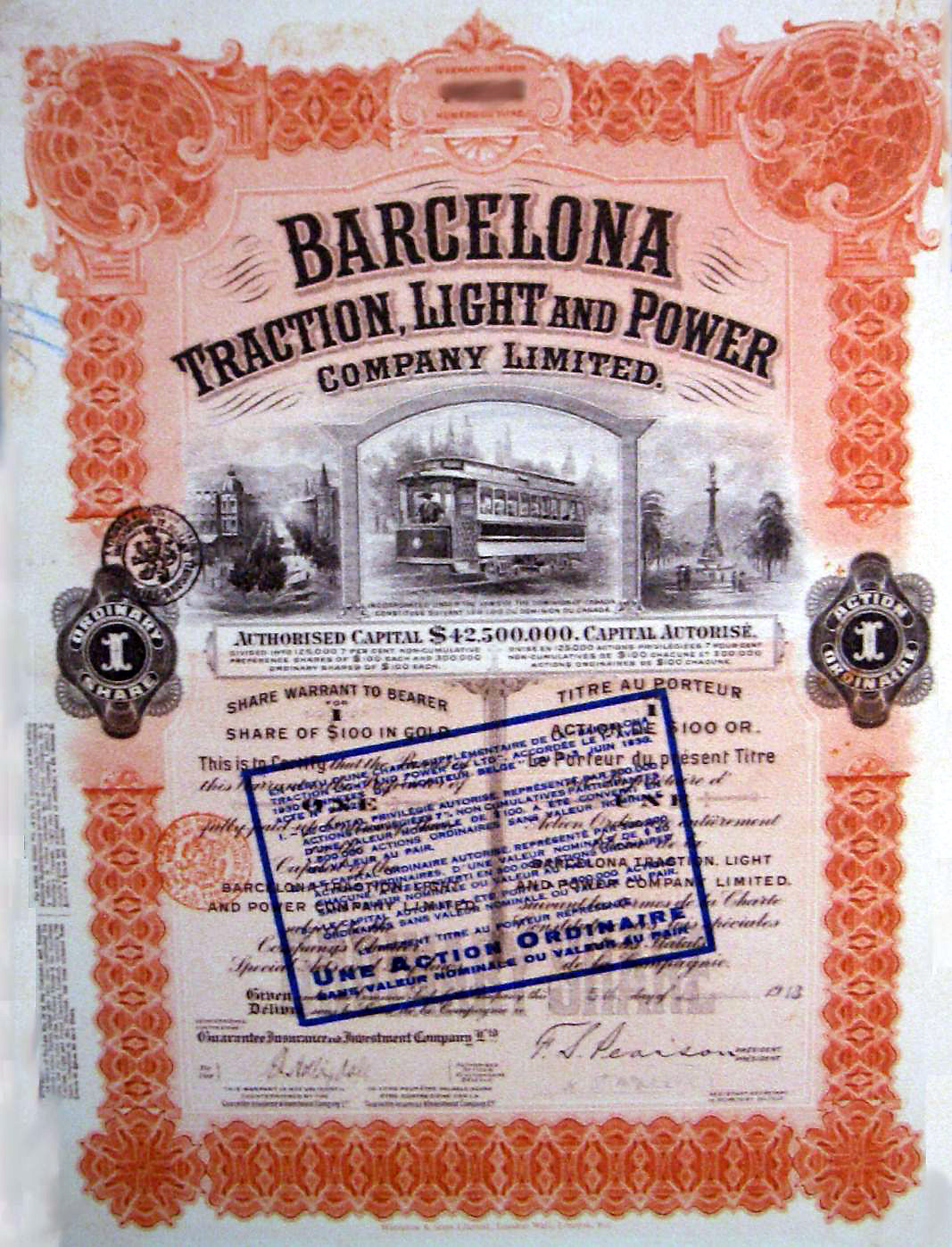
A share.

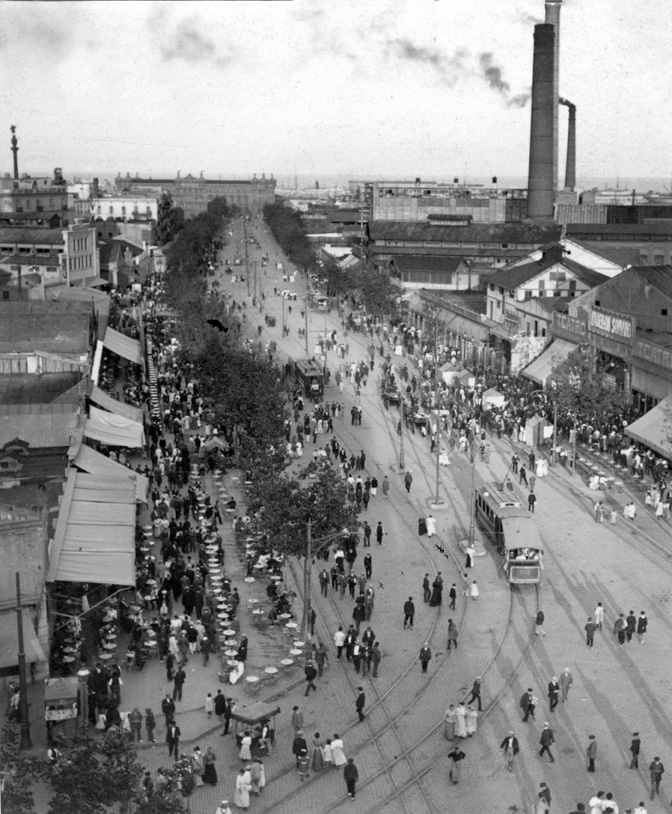
Avinguda del Paral·lel in 1913, looking east showing the chimneys of the power station

The Barcelona Traction Light and Power Company, Limited (locally known as La canadiense in Spanish and La canadenca in Catalan, "The Canadian") was a Canadian utility company that operated light and power utilities in Catalonia, Spain. It was incorporated on September 12, 1911 in Toronto, Ontario, Canada by Frederick Stark Pearson. The company was developed by Belgian-American engineer Dannie Heineman.

It operated in Spain but was owned mostly by the Belgian holding companies SOFINA and SIDRO and became the subject of the important International Court of Justice case, Belgium v. Spain (1970).

Pearson died in the 1915 sinking of the Lusitania.

In 1919, a conflict at a subsidiary escalated into a 44-day general strike that halted Catalan industry and resulted in Spain establishing an 8-hour workday. The company was taken over in 1948 by Spanish industrialist Juan March after currency restrictions prevented it from paying interest on its foreign bonds.

== 1919 strike ==
In 1919, a conflict between a BTLP subsidiary, Riegos y fuerzas del Ebro, and eight office workers escalated into a 44-day general strike called by the Anarcho-Syndicalist National Confederation of Labour halting Barcelona and 70% of the Catalan industry. A success for labour, the strike ended with a law establishing an 8-hour workday throughout Spain, the liberation of imprisoned workers without a pending process, wage increases for La Canadiense workers and half-wages for the month spent striking.

== Juan March ==
Juan March was a Spaniard from Mallorca in the Balearic Islands who had begun his career as a smuggler and had become an industrialist and banker. He fled Spain after the government of the Second Spanish Republic tried to arrest him. In 1936, he financed a right-wing and military coup that culminated in the three-year Spanish Civil War. March was widely known for involvement in lucrative illegal activities, for bribery and political influence, and for bending the law whenever he saw a benefit. This was exemplified in his 1948 takeover of the Barcelona Traction, Light, and Power Company (BTLP) for a small fraction of its real worth.

BTLP was a utility company which provided power and streetcar services in Barcelona; originally incorporated in Canada, it was mostly owned by Belgian investors. BTLP had come through the civil war largely undamaged, and was quite profitable. Its assets were about £10,000,000 (about $500,000,000 in 2010). However, for the convenience of some of its foreign investors, BTLP had issued some bonds denominated in pounds, and the interest on these bonds was payable in pounds. The Spanish government had imposed currency restrictions: BTLP was unable to exchange its Spanish pesetas for pounds, and so could not pay the interest.

This was not viewed with any great alarm by the bond-holders; BTLP had plenty of pesetas and would pay the interest arrears whenever the currency restrictions were relaxed.

However, March sensed an opportunity. Agents secretly acting for him quietly bought up the bonds (about £500,000). In February 1948, they appeared in a Spanish court, asserted that BTLP was in default on the bonds, and demanded immediate relief. The judge agreed and awarded ownership of all BTLP's assets to them (in fact to March). BTLP's foreign investors appealed, but got no relief from Spanish courts. The Belgian government appealed to the International Court of Justice but to no avail: the final resolution coming in 1970, eight years after March's death.

=== Lawsuit ===
The government of Spain under Franco in the 1960s placed restrictions on foreigners doing business in Spain. The Belgian stockholders in Barcelona Traction lost money and wanted to sue in the International Court of Justice, where their cause was defended by Belgian lawyer Henri Rolin. But in the court Judge Fornier ruled on the side of Spain, holding that only the state in which the corporation was incorporated (Canada) can sue. The decision in Belgium v. Spain is important in public international law because it demonstrates the importance of protections of corporate nationality in nominal ("paper") terms over effective nationality (siège social) where the ownership effectively resides. Unless a principle of law permits a country to espouse a national's claim in the ICJ, there cannot be an espousal.

The case is also important as it demonstrates how the concept of diplomatic protection under international law can apply equally to corporations as to individuals. It also expanded the notion of obligations owed erga omnes (in relation to everyone) in the international community.

== Acquisitions ==
- Tranvías de Barcelona (1912)
- Ferrocarriles de Barcelona (1911–1913)
- Compañía Barcelonesa de Electricidad (1912)
- Saltos del Segre (1912)
- Energía Eléctrica de Cataluña (1923)
- Sociedad Española Hidráulica del Freser (1923)
- Compañía General de Electricidad SA
- Electricista Catalana SA
- Saltos del Ebro SA (1930)
- Hidroeléctrica del Segre (1933)
- Saltos de Cataluña SA (1935)
- Sociedad Productora de Fuerzas Motrices (1941)

== See also ==
- List of International Court of Justice cases
