= Lake Medina Shores, Texas =

- Census-designated place
- Location within Texas
- Coordinates: 29°38′17″N 98°59′29″W
- Country: United States
- State: Texas
- Counties: Bandera, Medina

Area
  - Total: 3.4 sq mi (8.8 km^{2})
  - Land: 3.1 sq mi (8.0 km^{2})
  - Water: 0.3 sq mi (0.78 km^{2})
- Elevation: 1,168 ft (356 m)

Population (2020)
  - Total: 1,110
  - Density: 360/sq mi (140/km^{2})
- Time zone: UTC-6 (Central (CST))
  - Summer (DST): UTC-5 (CDT)
- Zip Code: 78003
- Area code: 830
- FIPS code: 48-40674
- GNIS feature ID: 2586947

Lake Medina Shores is a census-designated place in Bandera and Medina counties, Texas, United States. As of the 2020 census, Lake Medina Shores had a population of 1,110. This was a new CDP for the 2010 census.

== Demographics ==
Historical population
Census	Pop.	Note	%±
2010	1,235		—
2020	1,110		−10.1%
U.S. Decennial Census; 1850–1900 1910; 1920 1930 1940; 1950 1960 1970; 1980 1990 2000; 2010 2020

Lake Medina Shores first appeared as a census designated place in the 2010 U.S. census.

Lake Medina Shores CDP, Texas – Racial and ethnic composition Note: the US Census treats Hispanic/Latino as an ethnic category. This table excludes Latinos from the racial categories and assigns them to a separate category. Hispanics/Latinos may be of any race.
Race / Ethnicity (NH = Non-Hispanic)	Pop 2010	Pop 2020	% 2010	% 2020
White alone (NH)	918	693	74.33%	62.43%
Black or African American alone (NH)	5	4	0.40%	0.36%
Native American or Alaska Native alone (NH)	17	14	1.38%	1.26%
Asian alone (NH)	2	2	0.16%	0.18%
Native Hawaiian or Pacific Islander alone (NH)	0	1	0.00%	0.09%
Other race alone (NH)	2	3	0.16%	0.27%
Mixed race or Multiracial (NH)	16	90	1.30%	8.11%
Hispanic or Latino (any race)	275	303	22.27%	27.30%
Total	1,235	1,110	100.00%	100.00%

As of the 2020 United States census, there were 1,110 people, 504 households, and 355 families residing in the CDP.

== Geography ==
According to the United States Census Bureau, the CDP has a total area of 3.4 square miles (8.8 km^{2}), of which 3.1 square miles (8.0 km^{2}) is land and 0.3 square miles (0.78 km^{2}) is water.
