= Natalia Independent School District =

School district in Texas, United States

Address
- 805 Pearson Street Natalia, Texas, 78059; United States

District information
- Type: Public
- Grades: PK–12
- Schools: 5
- NCES District ID: 4832130

Students and staff
- Students: 1,315 (2025–2026)
- Teachers: 95.90 (on an FTE basis) (2025–2026)
- Staff: 116.26 (on an FTE basis) (2025–2026)
- Student–teacher ratio: 13.71 (2025–2026)

Other information
- Website: www.nataliaisd.net

Natalia Independent School District is a public school district based in Natalia, Texas (USA).

The district has four campuses - Natalia High (Grades 9-12), Natalia Junior High (Grades 6-8), Natalia Elementary (Grades 2-5), and Natalia Early Childhood Center (Grades PK-1).

In 2009, the school district was rated "recognized" by the Texas Education Agency.

In 2015 the board selected Michael E. Steck as its superintendent.
