= Dunlay, Texas =

Unincorporated Texas community

Coordinates: 29°20′55″N 98°59′26″W

Dunlay is an unincorporated community in Medina County, Texas. It lies about six miles west of Castroville and eight miles east of Hondo on U.S. Highway 90.

== History ==
The town was named after Jerry Dunlay, a local train conductor. Dunlay, originally called Enterprise, was established in 1881 along the Galveston, Harrisburg and San Antonio Railway. A post office was established in 1890 with Norval Seymour Murray as postmaster. After May 10, 1895, the town was called Dunlay.
