= Pedro de Medina =

Spanish cartographer

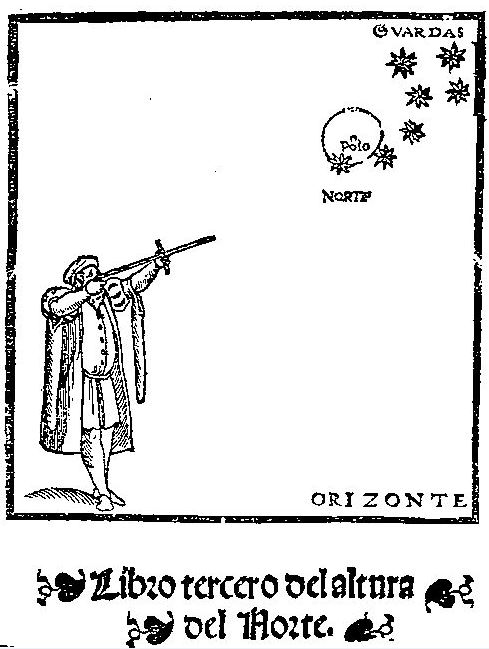
Cross-staff in Regimento de Navegación by Pedro de Medina, 1552. A goniometric instrument used to measure the altitude of stars.

Medina's Suma de cosmographia ("Compendium of Cosmography"). The folio-size manuscript on parchment includes 11 beautiful astronomical figures with accompanying text. The illustrations are carefully drawn and illuminated in gold and in bright colors, with the initial letters of text pages in highlighted golden insets. A fine mappa mundi on a double-page spread, illuminated in red, blue, green, sienna, and gold, represents the known world and reflects the state of geographic knowledge in Spain and Portugal at that time. Prominently shown on the map is the line of demarcation, established in the 1494 Treaty of Tordesillas, between the domains of Spain and Portugal.

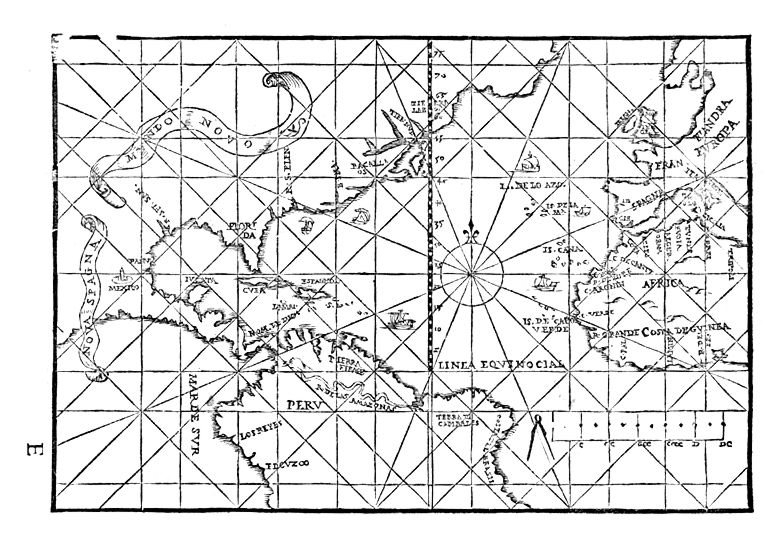
Mappa mundi by Pedro de Medina & G.B. Pedrazano, Venice, 1554

Pedro de Medina (1493 – Seville, 1567) was a Spanish cartographer and author of navigational texts. His well-known Arte de navegar ("The Art of Navigation", 1545) was the first work published in Europe dealing exclusively with navigational techniques (Martín Fernández de Enciso's Suma de Geographia, 1519, which gave ample geographical information already contained solar declination tables with explanations and the corrections for finding the latitude by measuring the height of Polaris).

== Early life ==
Medina is believed to have been born in Seville, although based on his name and the protection afforded to him by the Dukes of Medina Sidonia he may instead have been born in Medina-Sidonia. In 1520 he became tutor to Juan Claros Pérez de Guzmán y Aragón, the Count of Niebla and heir to Juan Alfonso Pérez de Guzmán, 6th Duke of Medina Sidonia.

== Navigational science and cosmography ==
=== Earlier career ===
After having amicably parted from the House of Medina Sidonia, he sought recognition as a cosmographer and brought out a text titled Libro de Cosmografía ("Book of Cosmography", 1538). He received official permission to compile navigation maps, to write books about pilotage, and to manufacture navigational devices necessary for voyages to the Indies. In February 1539, he was appointed in Seville as examiner of the navigators and ship's captains who would take part in the conquest of the Indies. His work was closely associated with the "House of Trade" (Casa de Contratación), the Spanish government agency overseeing the exploration and colonization of the New World, although he never succeeded in gaining employment in that agency. He soon became aware of defects in the training of navigators and in the instruments, books and maps they relied upon, and wrote a "Representation" to King Charles I on the subject. This was the culmination of his rivalry with the cartographer Diego Gutiérrez and his family, who had the support of John Cabot. Medina's letter quickly led to a royal command of 22 February 1545, banning Gutiérrez from continuing to issue maps and instruments that Medina had described as very harmful to the students.

=== Arte de navegar ===
In 1545 Medina published his most important work, Arte de navegar ("The Art of Navigation") in eight volumes. It was dedicated to the future Philip II, in support of his quest to be appointed royal cosmographer. This work was an overview of existing knowledge on this subject, and was probably a revision and expansion of his "Book of Cosmography", which had already been examined by the Council of the Indies. Arte was the first treatise on navigation to be published in Spain (although a book by Martín Cortés de Albacar, published in Cádiz in 1551, was also important). The senior cosmographer Alonso de Chaves demonstrated that Medina's Arte was a compilation, made with the assistance of other writers. Diego Gutiérrez and other authors claimed that they had helped with parts of the book, and Medina himself acknowledged the assistance of Francisco Faleiro and Alonso de Santa Cruz on other occasions, but not with the writing of Arte. The book was internationally disseminated and quickly translated into several European languages: it was translated into French fifteen times between 1554 and 1663, five times into Dutch (1580-1598), three times into Italian (1554-1609) and twice into English. This work contributed considerably to the development of navigation on the high seas.

=== Later career ===
In 1549 Medina achieved appointment as honorary royal cosmographer. An abridged edition of Arte in Spanish was published in 1552 under the title Regimiento de navegación ("The control of navigation"), omitting most of the theory of spherical geometry and including only what was essential for navigators. A later edition of Regimiento (1563) updated this popular handbook and added twenty "warnings" for the practical navigator. His unpublished Suma de Cosmographia ("Compendium of cosmography") of 1561 is an abridged version of Arte de navegar, containing information on astrology and navigation and written for a nonspecialist audience.

Medina's work adhered to the cosmological system of Ptolemy rather than that of Copernicus. Despite his knowledge and achievements Medina continued to deny the phenomenon of magnetic declination, of which he lacked personal experience, in opposition to the opinion of most other cosmographers of the time.

Medina acted as royal adviser during the two assemblies convened by the Council of the Indies in 1554 and 1556 to determine the precise position of the Philippines and the Moluccas, and to define the demarcation between Spanish and Portuguese control in that part of the world. Mount Medina in Antarctica is named in his honour.

== Other works ==
Medina also wrote historical and philosophical books. In 1548 he published a work titled Libro de las grandezas y cosas memorables de España ("Book of the great deeds and memorable things of Spain"). This dealt with historical acts and important towns in Spain, with engravings and transcriptions of key documents. It was later (1595) revised and expanded by Diego Pérez de Mesa, professor of mathematics at the University of Alcalá. Other works included Libro de la verdad ("Book of truth", 1555), written in furtherance of disputes with the Casa de Contratación, and his last work, (Crónica de los excelentes señores duques Medina Sidonia ("Chronicle of the excellent ducal lords of Medina Sidonia", 1561).

== List of works ==
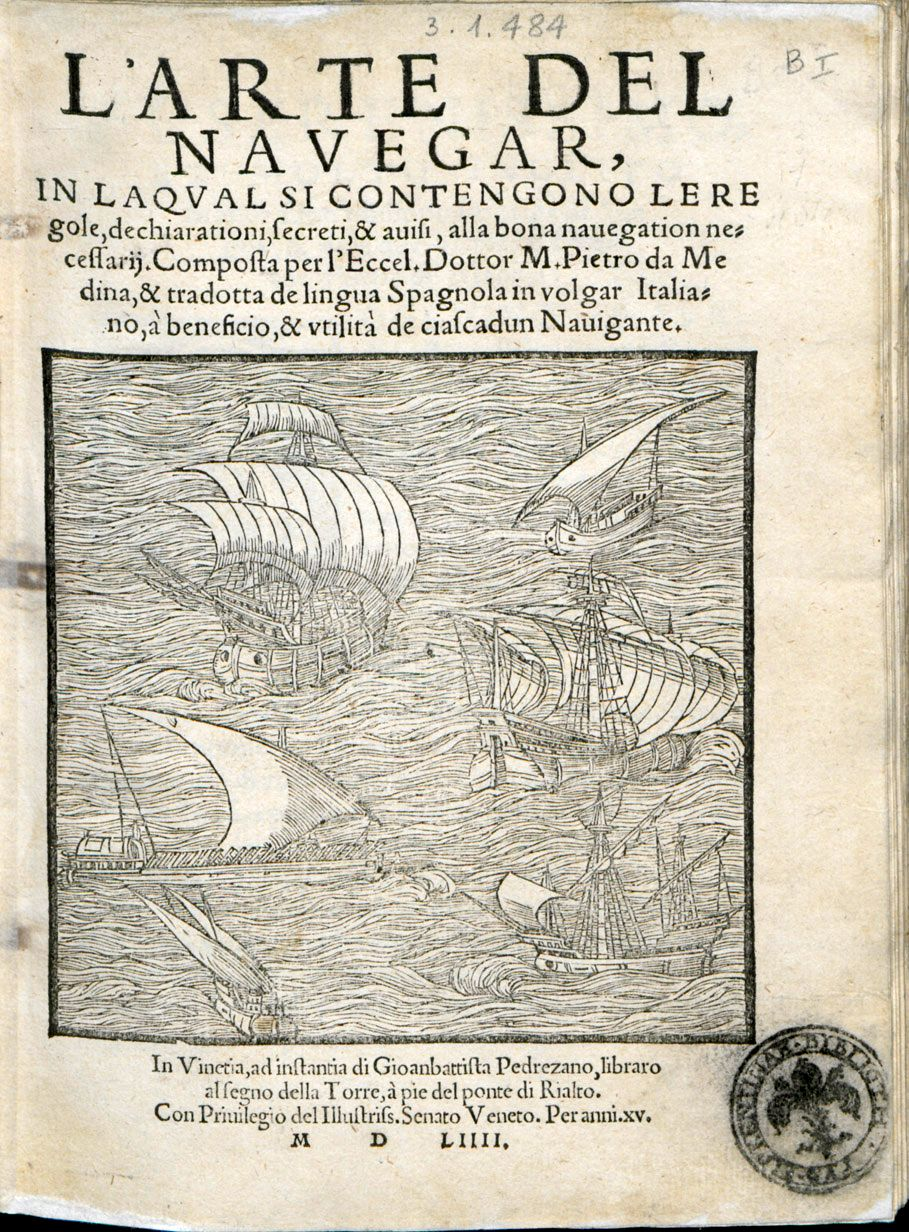
Arte de navegar, 1554

- Obras. Libro de las grandezas y cosas memorables de España. Libro de la verdad, published by Ángel González Palencia, Madrid: CSIC, 1944.
- Libro de Cosmografía (1538).
- Pedro de Medina (2009). Arte de navegar en que se contienen todas las reglas, declaraciones, secretos y avisos a que la buena navegación son necesarios, y se debe saber. Editorial MAXTOR. ISBN 978-84-9761-535-8.. First published Valladolid, Francisco Fernández de Córdoba, 1545, many times reprinted and translated. Facsimile copy in Madrid: Patronato del Inst. Nacional del Libro Español, 1945, and an electronic version in Obras clásicas de Náutica y Navegación, Madrid, Fundación Histórica Tavera, 1998, CD-Rom.
- Pedro de Medina (1548). Libro de grandezas y Cosas memorables de Espana. Agora nuevamente impr. - Madrid 1568.. First published Seville, Dominico de Robertis, 1548. Facsimile copies: Instituto de España y Biblioteca Nacional, Madrid 1994, with an introduction by Pilar Cuesta Domingo; Maxtor, 1666 edition by Pedro de Robles and Juan de Villanueva. Expanded and republished in 1595 by Diego Pérez de Mesa: Primera y segunda parte de las Grandezas y cosas notables de España, Juan Gracián, 1595.
- Crónica de España (Sevilla, 1548)
- Pedro de Medina (1555). Libro De La Verdad: Donde se contiene[n] dozientos Dialogos, que entre la Verdad y el hombre se tratan sobre la conuersion del peccador ... Fernandez de Cordova.. First published Seville, 1549. Included in the Obras edition of 1944.
- Regimiento de navegación, en que se contienen las reglas, declaraciones y avisos del libro dArte de navegar, Sevilla: Juan Canella, 1 December 1552.
- Suma de Cosmographia, unpublished manuscript, 1561. Modern editions: facsimile, Seville, Excma Diputación Provincial Patronato de Cultura, 1947; Valencia: Albatros, 1980, in the care of J. Fernández Jiménez; de-luxe edition on two volumes, Madrid: Grial, 1999 with an introduction by Ana García Herráez.
- Hispaniae Tabula Geographica (Sevilla, 1560).
- Crónica de los excelentes señores duques Medina Sidonia (1561).
- Regimiento de navegación compuesto por el maestro Pedro de Medina. Contiene las cosas que los pilotos han de saber para bien navegar: y los remedios y avisos que han de tener para los peligros que navegando les pueden suceder, Sevilla: Simón Carpintero, 1563. Modern edition: Regimiento de navegación. Compuesto por el Maestro Pedro de Medina (1563). Republished by Instituto de España as a facsimile edition. 2 volumes: Original and Transcription. Madrid, Instituto de España, 1964.

== Sources ==
- Ursula Lamb (1966). The Cosmographies of Pedro de Medina. Editorial Castalia.
- Ursula Lamb (Ed.), A Navigator's Universe: The Libro de Cosmografia of Medina (Chicago, 1972).
- José María López Piñero, et al., Diccionario histórico de la Ciencia Moderna en España, Barcelona: Ediciones Península, 1983, 2 vols.
- José María López Piñero, Ciencia y Técnica en la Sociedad Española de los Siglos XVI y XVII, Barcelona: Labor, 1979.
- Manuel Fernández de Navarrete, Disertación Sobre La Historia de la Nautica y de las mathematicas, Madrid, 1846.
- Ángel González Palencia, La Primera Guía de la España imperial, in Obras by Pedro de Medina, (Madrid, 1944).
- Juan Fernández Jiménez, Introduction to the Suma de la Cosmographia by Pedro de Medina, (Valencia, 1980).
- Mariano Cuesta Domingo, La obra cosmográfica y náutica de Pedro de Medina, Madrid 1998.
