= LaCoste, Texas =

La Coste, Texas
- City
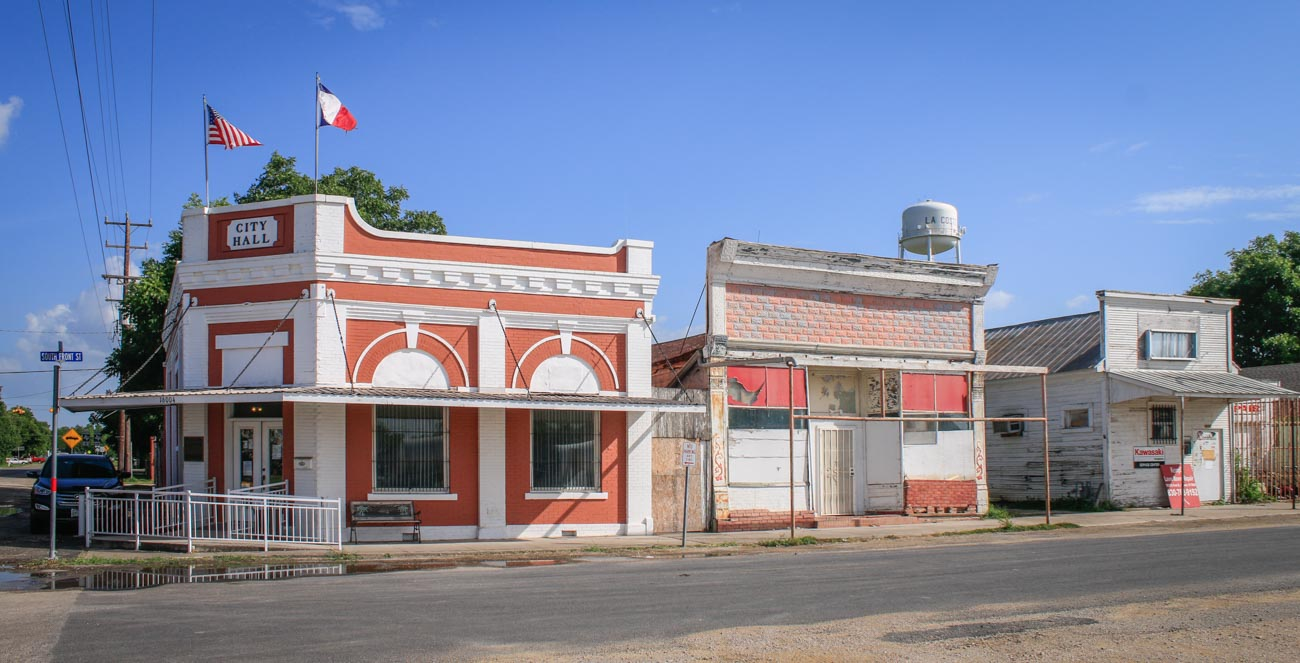
- City hall building in LaCoste, Texas

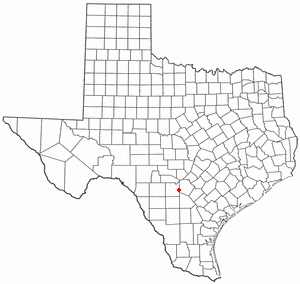
- Location of La Coste, Texas

- Coordinates: 29°18′36″N 98°48′42″W
- Country: United States
- State: Texas
- County: Medina

Government
  - Mayor: Jeremy Johonnett

Area
  - Total: 0.63 sq mi (1.64 km^{2})
  - Land: 0.63 sq mi (1.63 km^{2})
  - Water: 0 sq mi (0.00 km^{2})
- Elevation: 719 ft (219 m)

Population (2020)
  - Total: 1,077
  - Density: 1,710/sq mi (661/km^{2})
- Time zone: UTC-6 (Central (CST))
  - Summer (DST): UTC-5 (CDT)
- ZIP code: 78039
- Area code: 830
- FIPS code: 48-40108
- GNIS feature ID: 2411589

La Coste is a city in Medina County, Texas, United States. As of the 2020 census, La Coste had a population of 1,077. It is part of the San Antonio metropolitan area.

== Geography ==
According to the United States Census Bureau, the city has a total area of 0.6 square miles (1.6 km^{2}), all of it land.

== Demographics ==
Historical population
Census	Pop.	Note	%±
1970	768		—
1980	862		12.2%
1990	1,021		18.4%
2000	1,255		22.9%
2010	1,119		−10.8%
2020	1,077		−3.8%
U.S. Decennial Census

=== 2020 census ===
As of the 2020 census, LaCoste had a population of 1,077 and a median age of 43.3 years. 21.8% of residents were under the age of 18 and 18.8% of residents were 65 years of age or older. For every 100 females there were 97.6 males, and for every 100 females age 18 and over there were 92.7 males age 18 and over.

There were 404 households in LaCoste, of which 32.7% had children under the age of 18 living in them. Of all households, 43.8% were married-couple households, 17.8% were households with a male householder and no spouse or partner present, and 30.2% were households with a female householder and no spouse or partner present. About 25.5% of all households were made up of individuals and 11.9% had someone living alone who was 65 years of age or older.

There were 445 housing units, of which 9.2% were vacant. The homeowner vacancy rate was 1.2% and the rental vacancy rate was 3.8%.

0.0% of residents lived in urban areas, while 100.0% lived in rural areas.

Racial composition as of the 2020 census
Race	Number	Percent
White	606	56.3%
Black or African American	4	0.4%
American Indian and Alaska Native	8	0.7%
Asian	10	0.9%
Native Hawaiian and Other Pacific Islander	1	0.1%
Some other race	114	10.6%
Two or more races	334	31.0%
Hispanic or Latino (of any race)	654	60.7%

=== 2000 census ===
As of the census of 2000, there were 1,255 people, 416 households, and 338 families residing in the city. The population density was 1,954.0 inhabitants per square mile (754.4/km^{2}). There were 466 housing units at an average density of 725.6 per square mile (280.2/km^{2}). The racial makeup of the city was 79.60% White, 1.43% African American, 1.20% Native American, 0.40% Asian, 14.02% from other races, and 3.35% from two or more races. Hispanic or Latino of any race were 51.63% of the population.

In 2000 La Coste was the place in the United States with the highest percentage of its population reporting Alsatian ancestry, with 7.1% of the population reporting Alsatian ancestry.

There were 416 households, out of which 40.9% had children under the age of 18 living with them, 58.9% were married couples living together, 17.8% had a female householder with no husband present, and 18.8% were non-families. 16.6% of all households were made up of individuals, and 6.7% had someone living alone who was 65 years of age or older. The average household size was 3.01 and the average family size was 3.37.

In the city, the population was spread out, with 31.5% under the age of 18, 8.8% from 18 to 24, 30.0% from 25 to 44, 18.2% from 45 to 64, and 11.5% who were 65 years of age or older. The median age was 32 years. For every 100 females, there were 95.5 males. For every 100 females age 18 and over, there were 93.7 males.

The median income for a household in the city was $36,786, and the median income for a family was $39,342. Males had a median income of $25,750 versus $19,773 for females. The per capita income for the city was $13,199. About 8.5% of families and 13.5% of the population were below the poverty line, including 20.9% of those under age 18 and 10.4% of those age 65 or over.

== Education ==
The City of La Coste is served by the Medina Valley Independent School District.
