= Atascosa, Texas =

Human settlement in Texas, U.S.

- Unincorporated community
- Location within Texas Location within the United States
- Coordinates: 29°16′01″N 98°43′55″W
- Country: United States
- State: Texas
- County: Bexar

Area
  - Total: 41.97 sq mi (108.7 km^{2})
- Elevation: 650 ft (200 m)
  - Density: 208/sq mi (80/km^{2})
- Time zone: UTC-6 (Central (CST))
  - Summer (DST): UTC-5 (CDT)
- ZIP code: 78002
- Area codes: 210 & 726
- GNIS feature ID: 1379369

Atascosa (/ˌætəsˈkoʊsə/ AT-əs-KOH-sə) is an unincorporated community located in southwestern Bexar County, Texas, United States. According to the Handbook of Texas, the community had a population of 300 in 2000. The community is part of the San Antonio Metropolitan Statistical Area.

== History ==
The community's name means "boggy" in Spanish and was first settled sometime after the American Civil War. The Atascosa post office opened in 1872. In 1885, the community had a Baptist church, a general store, a saloon, two blacksmiths, and a population of 180. A coal mine and pottery were in operation by 1900. Atascosa then had a church, a lodge, and several stores that served 300 inhabitants in the mid-1930s. Its population remained steady throughout this period and had four businesses in the early 1990s. 47 businesses were in the community in 2000 and its population remained the same.

== Geography ==
Atascosa is located 14 miles southwest of downtown San Antonio. It is located between Von Ormy and Lytle off I-35 and on Old Pearsall Road at Jarratt Road.

== Demographics ==
As of the 2010 U.S. census, there were 8,735 people residing in this populated place. The racial makeup of this area is 63.66% White, 0.54% African American, 0.63% Native American, 0.42% Asian, 0.11% Pacific Islander, and 34.63% from other races. The Hispanic population is 7,167, which is 82.05% of the total Atascosa population.

== Education ==
Atascosa is included in the Southwest ISD. McNair Middle School and Elm Creek Elementary are located in Atascosa off Old Pearsall Road. The high school serving Atascosa is San Antonio's Southwest High School. Before that time, Atascosa had schools in 1885 and the mid-1930s.

== Agriculture ==
According to the National Agricultural Statistics Service 2007 census, there are more than 70 crop operations in Atascosa with three operations that are valued at more than $250,000 each. There are more than 125 animal operations in Atascosa. Many people in the area raise cattle, horses, goats, pigs, peacocks, and other poultry.

== Utilities ==
Electricity is provided to the area by CPS Energy. The water is supplied by the Atascosa Rural Water Supply, located off Jarratt Road and Pearsall.

== Notable person ==
- Augustus McCloskey, a former U.S. Representative, who went to school in Atascosa.
