= Airport City, Texas =

Unincorporated community in Texas, US

- Unincorporated community
- Location within Texas
- Coordinates: 29.5330076°N 98.3014016°W
- Country: United States
- Texas: U.S. state
- County: Bexar
- Elevation: 732 ft (223 m)

Airport City is an unincorporated community in Bexar County, Texas, United States. It is part of Greater San Antonio.

Situated on Farm to Market Road 78 and near Randolph Air Force Base, it was likely established around 1930, alongside the AFB. At its peak in the mid-1960s, its population was 106. By the 1990s, it was consolidated into Converse and Universal City.
