= Southwest Legacy High School =

Public school in Texas, United States

Coordinates: 29.2976°N 98.5883°W

Location
- 4495 Verano Parkway, Building 100; Von Ormy, (Bexar County), Texas 78252; United States

Information
- Type: Public high school
- Established: 2017; 9 years ago
- Principal: Roxie Freeman
- Staff: 120.40 (FTE)
- Grades: 9-12
- Enrollment: 2,132 (2023-24)
- Student to teacher ratio: 17.71
- Colors: Forest green and gold
- Nickname: Titans
- Website: Southwest Legacy High School

Southwest Legacy High School is a senior high school in San Antonio, Texas, with a Von Ormy postal address. It is a part of the Southwest Independent School District and classified as a 6A school by the UIL.

Financed by a bond passed in 2012, it had a cost of $68 million and has a capacity of 3,200 students. It opened in 2017, on August 28. In the period 1962–2017 it was the first traditional comprehensive high school, operated by a school district, in southern San Antonio, as well as, from 1977 to 2017, the first public high school established south of U.S. Route 90.
