= Texas State Highway 218 =

State highway in Texas

State Highway 218
- Pat Booker Road
- SH 218; highlighted in red

Route information
- Maintained by TxDOT
- Length: 3.985 mi (6.413 km)
- Existed: 1935–present

Major junctions
- West end: I-35 at Live Oak
- Loop 1604 at Universal City
- East end: FM 78 at Randolph Air Force Base

Location
- Country: United States
- State: Texas

Highway system
- Highways in Texas; Interstate; US; State; Former; Toll; Loops; Spurs; FM/RM; Park; Rec
← SH 217	→ SH 219

State Highway 218 (SH 218), also known as Pat Booker Road, is a short state highway in the U.S. state of Texas, connecting Interstate 35 to Randolph Air Force Base at Farm to Market Road 78. The highway is located in Greater San Antonio, and connects the cities of Live Oak and Universal City.

== History ==
SH 218 has existed in its current alignment since June 11, 1935 to serve as an access road to Randolph Air Force Base from U.S. Highway 81 (now I-35).

== Route description ==
SH 218 splits from I-35 just west of the I-35/Loop 1604 interchange in Live Oak and heads towards the east-southeast. About a half mile from I-35, SH 218 intersects Loop 1604 via a diamond interchange. The highway continues towards the southeast through Universal City, until it ends at FM 78 at the main gate of Randolph Air Force Base after just 3.99 miles (6.42 km).

== Junction list ==
The entire route is in Bexar County.

Location	mi	km	Destinations	Notes
Live Oak	0.0	0.0	I-35 / IKEA-RBFCU Parkway	I-35 north exit 171; south exit 172; continues west as IKEA-RBFCU Parkway
Universal City	0.9	1.4	Loop 1604 to I-35 north – Live Oak	Interchange
Universal City	3.6	5.8	FM 78 (Gordon A. Blake Highway)	Continues east as Harmon Road to JBSA Randolph
1.000 mi = 1.609 km; 1.000 km = 0.621 mi
