= Cassin, Texas =

- Unincorporated community
- Location within Texas Location within the United States
- Coordinates: 29°15′31″N 98°29′31″W
- Country: United States
- State: Texas
- County: Bexar
- Elevation: 528 ft (161 m)
- Time zone: UTC-6 (Central (CST))
  - Summer (DST): UTC-5 (CDT)
- Area code: 210
- GNIS feature ID: 1377185

Cassin is an unincorporated community in Bexar County, in the U.S. state of Texas. According to the Handbook of Texas, the community had a population of 50 in 1990. It is located within the Greater San Antonio metropolitan area.

== History ==
The area in what is known as Cassin today was first settled sometime before 1900. It was named for William Cassin, a local landowner. The community served as a flag stop station for the San Antonio, Uvalde and Gulf Railroad in 1913. There was a store and a church in Cassin in the mid-1930s. Its population was 175 in 1946 and dropped to only 50 in 1990.

== Geography ==
Cassin is located off U.S. Highway 281, just south of Mitchell Lake, 12 mi (19 km) south of Downtown San Antonio in southern Bexar County.

== Education ==
Cassin was served by the Asa Mitchell school in the mid-1930s. Today, the community is served by the Southside Independent School District.
