= Sophie Gonzales =

Activist and labor organizer

Sophie Gonzales (January 30, 1920 – January 1, 1995) was an activist and union organizer from San Antonio, Texas. She became the first Mexican-American female organizer of the International Ladies' Garment Workers' Union (ILGWU). In 1959 she organized the Tex-Son Garment company strike. She served as a union organizer for the Amalgamated Clothing Workers of America (ACWA) in El Paso, Texas. She organized the 1965 strike at Hortex Manufacturing Company and the 1971 strike at Levi Strauss.

== Early life ==
Gonzales was born in San Antonio, Texas, in 1920 and raised on a ranch outside of Von Ormy, Texas. She was one of two daughters among the four Gonzales children. She attended high school in Somerset, Texas, near modern-day San Antonio, and enjoyed sports, including volleyball and basketball. Her siblings became her earlier influences by joining the Amalgamated Butchers of America Union. She dropped out of high school after tenth grade when she turned eighteen. She then moved to San Antonio with one of her brothers.

== Career ==
In 1956 Gonzales began working for a sweater company in San Antonio. After 3 years she became involved with ILGWU as its first female Mexican-American organizer. After 10 years with the union, the Tex-Son Garment Company in San Antonio began outsourcing labor to non-unionized firms out of state, prompting the San Antonio IGLWU local to go on strike. In 1959 Gonzales organized and led the effort, achieving a boycott of the company's products across Texas, and employing clever tactics to pressure the company. Joined by both white and Latina women (a heretofore unprecedented phenomena) Gonzales utilized fashion to dispel accusations of unladylike behavior attributed to the female strikers and to reinforce the women's persona as workers, including many spouses and mothers. During the strike, Gonzales made news describing the violent interactions between the strikers and the workers. Gonzales claimed that the workers meant to beat her up but failed.

Instead they sent down voodoo dolls with stick pins. The doll was dressed as Gonzales and she posed for a photo for the local newspaper to taunt the workers. However, the state's anti-union tendencies along with increasing counteraction from the owner and dissenting employees caused Gonzales to withdraw from the strike one year before its unsuccessful end in 1963.

Gonzales' talents were next deployed by the ACWA and the Federation of Union Representatives. From El Paso, Texas Gonzales became involved in important strikes against companies including Hortex Manufacturing Company, Levi Strauss and Farah Manufacturing Company over an 18-year span from 1965 to 1983 when she retired. During this period, she helped lead, organize, and implement effective boycotts. Her tenacity is said to have played a role in inspiring female strikers to join strikes and testify, overcoming their hesitancy to incur criticism from their male managers.

== Personal life ==
Little is known of Gonzales’ personal life other than that she was married to George Gray for 4 years in 1941 and, later, to Tony Moreno in 1955. She first married at age 21 and bore two sons, George Jr. and Dannie who served in the Air Force. Her second marriage to Moreno lasted for 15 years until 1970. In an interview with Irene Ledesma, Gonzales divulged that Moreno was jealous and possessive, even requesting that she drive more often, rather than sit in the passenger seat, so that she would not wave to other men on the street. Gonzales lived in El Paso until her death in San Antonio in 1995.

== Legacy ==
Gonzales is remembered as an innovative union organizer and champion of female participation in labor union activities. Hailed with a plaque bestowed upon her by the ACWA in 1983, Gonzales is credited in organizing the Tex-Son strike which saw the first cooperation of Caucasian and Latina women in a strike in the country. She was the first female ILGWU union organizer.
