= Veterans Memorial High School (San Antonio) =

Location
- 7618 E. Evans Road; San Antonio, Texas 78266; United States; 29.6094532°N 98.3394508°W

Information
- Type: Free Public
- Motto: Strive for Perfection, Settle for Excellence
- Established: August 2016
- School district: Judson Independent School District
- NCES School ID: 482499012976
- Principal: Sue Arredondo
- Faculty: 111.09 (on an FTE basis)
- Grades: 9–12
- Enrollment: 1,688 (2023–2024)
- Student to teacher ratio: 15.19
- Campus size: Medium
- Colors: Red, white, and navy
- Athletics conference: UIL Class AAAAA
- Nickname: Patriots
- Website: Veterans Memorial; High School

Veterans Memorial High School is a public high school in unincorporated Bexar County, Texas, United States. It is operated by the Judson Independent School District, and classified as a 5A school by the UIL. The school has a San Antonio address but is not within the San Antonio city limits.

For the 2024–2025 school year, the school was given a "C" by the Texas Education Agency, with distinctions for Academic Achievement in Social Studies.

The school was originally named after Willis Mackey, who retired in 2014 after serving seven years as the district superintendent, but the school board voted to change the name after controversy arose in the community over naming the school after him. The school's name was changed to Veterans Memorial High School before it opened in August 2016 with 600 freshmen and sophomore students. A junior class was added for the 2017–2018 school year, and Veterans High graduated its first class of seniors in May 2019.

== Notable alumni ==
- James Peoples, college football running back for the Penn State Nittany Lions
