= Buena Vista, Bexar County, Texas =

- Unincorporated community
- Location within Texas Location within the United States
- Coordinates: 29°16′17″N 98°27′41″W
- Country: United States
- State: Texas
- County: Bexar
- Elevation: 538 ft (164 m)
- Time zone: UTC-6 (Central (CST))
  - Summer (DST): UTC-5 (CDT)
- Area code: 210
- GNIS feature ID: 1353176

Buena Vista is an unincorporated community in Bexar County, in the U.S. state of Texas. It is located within the Greater San Antonio metropolitan area.

== History ==
The area in what is known as Buena Vista was first settled sometime before 1900. It had several houses and a store in the mid-1930s.

== Geography ==
Buena Vista is located at the intersection of Farm to Market Road 1937 and Blue Wing Road, 11 mi (18 km) southeast of Downtown San Antonio in southeastern Bexar County.

== Education ==
In the mid-1930s, Buena Vista had a school with five teachers for students in first through eighth grades until it joined the Southside Independent School District in the early 1950s. The community continues to be served by the Southside ISD today.
