= Salinas Elementary School =

Salinas Elementary School may refer to:

- Salinas Elementary School (Laredo, Texas)
- Salinas Elementary School (Universal City, Texas)
