= Sandy Oaks, Texas =

- City
- City of Sandy Oaks
- Location within Texas Location within the United States
- Coordinates: 29°10′53″N 98°24′27″W
- Country: United States
- State: Texas
- County: Bexar
- Incorporated: May 14, 2014

Government
  - Type: Type A General-Law Municipality

Area
  - Total: 2.39 sq mi (6.18 km^{2})
  - Land: 2.39 sq mi (6.18 km^{2})
  - Water: 0 sq mi (0.00 km^{2})
- Elevation: 623 ft (190 m)

Population (2020)
  - Total: 5,075
  - Density: 1,953.8/sq mi (754.36/km^{2})
- Time zone: UTC-6 (Central (CST))
  - Summer (DST): UTC-5 (CDT)
- ZIP code: 78112
- Area codes: 210, 726
- FIPS code: 48-65344
- GNIS feature ID: 2771705
- ANSI Code: 2771704
- Website: CityofSandyOaks.com

Sandy Oaks is a city in Bexar County, Texas, United States. Its population was 5,075 as of the 2020 census. The community voted to incorporate in an election held on May 14, 2014. A total of 128 votes were cast in the election, 96 (75%) in favor of incorporation and 32 (25%) against.

== Geography ==
Sandy Oaks is located along Interstate 37 at the intersection of Priest and Mathis roads in southeastern Bexar County. The city covers a total of 2.38 square miles, all land.

== Demographics ==
Historical population
Census	Pop.	Note	%±
2020	5,075		—
U.S. Decennial Census

=== 2020 census ===
As of the 2020 census, Sandy Oaks had a population of 5,075. The median age was 32.5 years. 30.9% of residents were under the age of 18 and 9.1% of residents were 65 years of age or older. For every 100 females there were 97.7 males, and for every 100 females age 18 and over there were 102.0 males age 18 and over.

The 2020 census reported that 0.0% of residents lived in urban areas, while 100.0% lived in rural areas.

There were 1,462 households in Sandy Oaks, of which 49.2% had children under the age of 18 living in them. Of all households, 56.0% were married-couple households, 17.3% were households with a male householder and no spouse or partner present, and 18.5% were households with a female householder and no spouse or partner present. About 15.2% of all households were made up of individuals and 5.2% had someone living alone who was 65 years of age or older.

There were 1,559 housing units, of which 6.2% were vacant. The homeowner vacancy rate was 2.0% and the rental vacancy rate was 5.3%.

Racial composition as of the 2020 census
Race	Number	Percent
White	2,371	46.7%
Black or African American	85	1.7%
American Indian and Alaska Native	101	2.0%
Asian	19	0.4%
Native Hawaiian and Other Pacific Islander	1	0.0%
Some other race	1,288	25.4%
Two or more races	1,210	23.8%
Hispanic or Latino (of any race)	4,113	81.0%

== Education ==
The city of Sandy Oaks is served by the Southside Independent School District.
