= Candlewood Elementary School =

Candlewood Elementary School may refer to:

- Candlewood Elementary School (Derwood, Maryland).
- Candlewood Elementary School (San Antonio, Texas).
