= Southside High School (Texas) =

Location
- 1460 Martinez Losoya Road; San Antonio, Bexar County, Texas 78221-9648; United States; 29.240505°N 98.470792°W

Information
- School type: Public high school
- Established: 1950
- School district: Southside Independent School District
- NCES School ID: 484092004652
- Faculty: 100.33 (on an FTE basis)
- Grades: 9–12
- Enrollment: 1,685 (2022–2023)
- Student to teacher ratio: 16.69
- Colors: Red & White
- Athletics conference: UIL Class 5A
- Mascot: Cardinals
- Newspaper: The Chirp
- Yearbook: The Feather
- Website: Southside High School

Southside High School is a 5A public high school in the Southside Independent School District of San Antonio, Texas (United States). Southside High School serves the far south side of the city of San Antonio. For the 2024-2025 school year, the school was given a "C" by the Texas Education Agency.

== Athletics ==
The Southside Cardinals compete in the following sports:

- Baseball
- Basketball
- Cross Country
- Football
- Golf
- Powerlifting
- Soccer
- Softball
- Track and Field
- Volleyball

The golf team has won consecutive district titles. The boys won in 1997, 1998, 1999, 2000, 2002, 2005, 2006, 2007, 2008, 2011, and 2012. The girls won in 1999, 2000, 2001, 2002, 2003, 2004, 2005, 2006, 2007, 2008, 2010, 2011, 2012, and 2013.

== Activities ==
=== Band ===
The Southside marching band, also known as the Mighty Cardinal Band, has around 100 members. It was also one of the featured bands for Battle of the Bands 2014 for its 2013-2014 show "Conquistador".
