= Farm to Market Road 78 =

Road in Texas, United States

Farm to Market Road 78

Route information
- Maintained by TxDOT
- Length: 30.205 mi (48.610 km)
- Existed: 1943–present

Major junctions
- West end: I-35 in San Antonio
- I-410 in San Antonio; Loop 1604 in Universal City; SH 218 in Universal City; SH 46 in Seguin; I-10 in Seguin
- East end: US 90 in Seguin

Location
- Country: United States
- State: Texas
- Counties: Bexar, Guadalupe

Highway system
- Highways in Texas; Interstate; US; State; Former; Toll; Loops; Spurs; FM/RM; Park; Rec
| ← FM 77 | → FM 80 |

Farm to Market Road 78 (FM 78) is a 30.205 mi (48.610 km) farm-to-market road connecting San Antonio and Seguin, Texas.

== Route description ==
The western terminus of FM 78 is in Bexar County, near Fort Sam Houston and the southern end of the concurrency of Interstates 35 and 410 in San Antonio. Access to FM 78 is available from I-35 Exit #162 and from I-410 Exit #31A (southbound) and #32 (northbound). Heading in a northeasterly direction, the route enters Kirby before reentering San Antonio. FM 78 crosses into Converse and then Universal City, where it has a junction with Loop 1604. Outside of the loop, the route borders the north edge of Randolph Air Force Base. FM 78 then enters Guadalupe County and passes through Schertz, Cibolo, Santa Clara, Marion, and McQueeney. The highway then crosses the Guadalupe River and enters the city of Seguin. It has a junction with I-10 at Exit #607, an interchange it shares with SH 46. FM 78 continues eastward into Seguin along West New Braunfels Street and then southward on 8th Street before reaching its terminus at US 90.

FM 78 provides a connection (in conjunction with I-35) between central San Antonio and Randolph Air Force Base. It also provides an alternate route (versus I-10 and Loop 1604) between Seguin and portions of the northeastern San Antonio metropolitan area. Between San Antonio and Cibolo, FM 78 is a four-lane road, dropping to a two-lane road until McQueeney, before becoming a four-lane divided route to I-10/SH 46.

== History ==
Present-day FM 78 is part of what was the much longer original SH 3 designated in 1917. Most of this route was usurped by US 90 during the mass redescription of the state's highway system in 1939, while FM 78 was designated on August 3, 1943, over the portion of SH 3 which ran from FM 25 (now part of SH 46) in western Seguin to SH 218 at what was then known as Randolph Field. On February 14, 1947, the western terminus was extended to Loop 13 (the northern section of which would become I-410 in the Interstate era), and the extension to I-35 occurred on August 1, 1977. The route was extended eastward into Seguin along New Braunfels and 8th Streets to its current terminus at US 90 on September 26, 1979.

On June 27, 1995, the mileage of the section from I-35 to FM 3009 in Schertz was officially transferred to Urban Road 78 (UR 78). The designation reverted to FM 78 with the elimination of the Urban Road system on November 15, 2018.

An older segment of FM 78 became Loop 539 on September 26, 1996, when the alignment of FM 78 in southern Cibolo was shifted to the south, while FM 78 was rerouted over the old Loop 539. Loop 539 was cancelled and given to the city of Cibolo on November 30, 2014.

== Major intersections ==
| County | Location | mi | km | Destinations | Notes |
|---|---|---|---|---|---|
| Bexar | San Antonio | 0.00 | 0.00 | I-35 to I-410 north (Connally Loop) – Austin, Downtown San Antonio | I-410 exit 31B southbound; western terminus. |
| Bexar | San Antonio | 0.50 | 0.80 | I-410 south (Connally Loop) to Loop 13 (W. W. White Road) | I-410 exit 32 northbound. |
| Bexar | Converse | 7.40 | 11.91 | FM 1516 | |
| Bexar | Converse | 8.60 | 13.84 | FM 3502 | |
| Bexar | Universal City | 9.20 | 14.81 | Loop 1604 (Anderson Loop) | |
| Bexar | Universal City | 10.40 | 16.74 | SH 218 west (Pat Booker Road) – Randolph Air Force Base | Eastern terminus of SH 218 |
| Bexar | | 11.30 | 18.19 | FM 1518 south – St. Hedwig | Western terminus of concurrency with FM 1518 |
| Guadalupe | Schertz | 12.00 | 19.31 | FM 1518 north | Eastern terminus of concurrency with FM 1518 |
| Guadalupe | Schertz | 12.70 | 20.44 | FM 3009 (Roy Richard Drive) | |
| Guadalupe | Cibolo | 13.60 | 21.89 | FM 1103 | |
| Guadalupe | Cibolo | 14.10 | 22.69 | Loop 539 east | Former alignment of FM 78 |
| Guadalupe | Cibolo | 14.90 | 23.98 | Loop 539 west | Former alignment of FM 78 |
| Guadalupe | Marion | 19.70 | 31.70 | FM 465 | |
| Guadalupe | | 22.70 | 36.53 | FM 1044 – New Braunfels | |
| Guadalupe | McQueeney | 25.90 | 41.68 | FM 725 south | Western terminus of concurrency with FM 725 |
| Guadalupe | McQueeney | 26.10 | 42.00 | FM 725 north – New Braunfels, Lake McQueeney | Eastern terminus of concurrency with FM 725 |
| Guadalupe | Seguin | 27.00 | 43.45 | FM 1620 | |
| Guadalupe | Seguin | 28.60 | 46.03 | SH 46 south to I-10 | |
| Guadalupe | Seguin | 28.80 | 46.35 | SH 46 north – New Braunfels | |
| Guadalupe | Seguin | 30.21 | 48.62 | US 90 | Eastern terminus; road continues south of US 90 as Eighth Street |
1.000 mi = 1.609 km; 1.000 km = 0.621 mi: Concurrency terminus
