= Thelma, Texas =

- Unincorporated community
- Location within Texas Location within the United States
- Coordinates: 29°12′51″N 98°30′6″W
- Country: United States
- State: Texas
- County: Bexar
- Elevation: 574 ft (175 m)
- Time zone: UTC-6 (Central (CST))
  - Summer (DST): UTC-5 (CDT)
- Area codes: 210, 726
- GNIS feature ID: 1380654

Thelma is an unincorporated community in Bexar County, in the U.S. state of Texas. According to the Handbook of Texas, the community had a population of 45 in 2000. It is located within the Greater San Antonio metropolitan area.

== History ==
Established around the turn of the twentieth century, and with a post-office built in 1906, Thelma became a station on the Antonio, Uvalde and Gulf Railroad in 1912. In the 1940s, the community had four dairies. After World War II, the town's population declined.

Historical population
Year	Pop.	±%
1914	300	—
1940	25	−91.7%
2000	45	+80.0%

== Geography ==
Thelma is located at the intersection of Texas State Highway Loop 1604 and the Southern Pacific Railroad, 15 mi (24 km) south of Downtown San Antonio in southern Bexar County.

== Education ==
Thelma is served by the Southside Independent School District.
