= Kirby, Texas =

- City
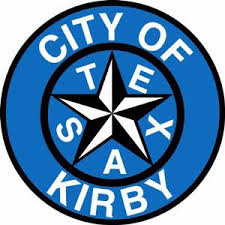
- Seal
- Nickname: Hobo Capital of Texas
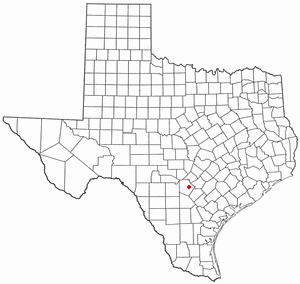
- Location of Kirby, Texas

- Coordinates: 29°27′40″N 98°23′20″W
- Country: United States
- State: Texas
- County: Bexar

Government
  - Type: Council-Manager
  - City Council: Mayor Janeshia Grider; Sylvia Apodaca; Sally itt Maria Lozano; Englan Sanchez; Joe Molina; Mike Grant
  - City Manager: Vacant
  - Chief of Police: Roxanne Cardona
  - Fire Chief: Vacant

Area
  - Total: 2.00 sq mi (5.18 km^{2})
  - Land: 2.00 sq mi (5.18 km^{2})
  - Water: 0 sq mi (0.00 km^{2})
- Elevation: 689 ft (210 m)

Population (2020)
  - Total: 8,142
  - Density: 4,361.2/sq mi (1,683.85/km^{2})
- Time zone: UTC-6 (Central (CST))
  - Summer (DST): UTC-5 (CDT)
- ZIP code: 78219
- Area codes: 210, 726
- FIPS code: 48-39448
- GNIS feature ID: 1339154
- Website: kirbytx.org

Kirby is a city in Bexar County, Texas, United States. According to the 2020 United States Census, there were 8,142 people in the city. It is an enclave of San Antonio and is part of the San Antonio metropolitan statistical area. Founded as an agricultural settlement along the Southern Pacific railroad, the city was transformed into a suburban community upon its incorporation in 1955. It is known as the "Hobo Capital of Texas."

== Geography ==
Kirby is located at 29°27′40″N 98°23′20″W (29.461032, –98.388763).

According to the United States Census Bureau, the city has a total area of 1.9 square miles (4.9 km^{2}), of which 0.04 square miles (0.10 km^{2}) (1.58%) is covered by water.

== Demographics ==
Historical population
Census	Pop.	Note	%±
1960	680		—
1970	3,238		376.2%
1980	6,435		98.7%
1990	8,326		29.4%
2000	8,673		4.2%
2010	8,000		−7.8%
2020	8,142		1.8%
U.S. Decennial Census

=== 2020 census ===
As of the 2020 census, Kirby had a population of 8,142 and a median age of 36.8 years; 25.3% of residents were under the age of 18 and 16.0% were 65 or older. For every 100 females there were 95.5 males, and for every 100 females age 18 and over there were 92.9 males.

100.0% of residents lived in urban areas, while 0.0% lived in rural areas.

There were 2,958 households, including 1,950 families, in Kirby, of which 36.8% had children under the age of 18 living in them. Of all households, 40.8% were married-couple households, 20.7% were households with a male householder and no spouse or partner present, and 31.6% were households with a female householder and no spouse or partner present. About 25.0% of all households were made up of individuals and 11.3% had someone living alone who was 65 years of age or older.

There were 3,158 housing units, of which 6.3% were vacant. The homeowner vacancy rate was 2.3% and the rental vacancy rate was 8.4%.

Racial composition as of the 2020 census
Race	Number	Percent
White	3,262	40.1%
Black or African American	1,179	14.5%
American Indian and Alaska Native	82	1.0%
Asian	141	1.7%
Native Hawaiian and Other Pacific Islander	17	0.2%
Some other race	1,388	17.0%
Two or more races	2,073	25.5%
Hispanic or Latino (of any race)	4,760	58.5%

=== 2000 census ===
As of the census of 2000, 8,673 people, 2,975 households, and 2,317 families lived in the city. The population density was 4,641.1 inhabitants per square mile (1,791.9/km^{2}). The 3,137 housing units had an average density of 1,678.7 per square mile (648.1/km^{2}). The racial makeup of the city was 64.27% White, 14.56% African American, 0.53% Native American, 2.06% Asian, 0.14% Pacific Islander, 14.83% from other races, and 3.61% from two or more races. Hispanics or Latinos of any race were 41.69% of the population.

Of the 2,975 households, 39.2% had children under 18 living with them, 54.1% were married couples living together, 18.4% had a female householder with no husband present, and 22.1% were not families. About 18.1% of all households were made up of individuals, and 5.9% had someone living alone who was 65 or older. The average household size was 2.92, and the average family size was 3.29.

In the city, the age distribution was 30.3% under 18, 8.9% from 18 to 24, 29.2% from 25 to 44, 22.6% from 45 to 64, and 9.1% who were 65 or older. The median age was 33 years. For every 100 females, there were 95.7 males. For every 100 females 18 and over, there were 89.3 males.

The median income for a household in the city was $38,919, and for a family was $42,329. Males had a median income of $28,699 versus $22,086 for females. The per capita income for the city was $15,615. About 8.9% of families and 11.0% of the population were below the poverty line, including 18.1% of those under 18 and 7.0% of those 65 or over.

== History ==
Kirby was founded as an agricultural community by German immigrants in the early 1900s. Its name derived from the Kirby yard of the Southern Pacific Railroad that crossed through the town. In 1920, the population was around 18 people, made up of mostly farmers. At this time, German was a commonly spoken language.

In the 1950s, the composition of the city shifted from mostly agricultural to military as individuals settled in homes to commute to work at Randolph AFB. The population grew to 600 at this point, and German was less commonly spoken. In 1955, the city was incorporated. A two-year-long drought began in 1957, which ultimately caused many farm failures. Unable to make a profit, the farmers decided to sell their land to the city. Homes and roads were constructed on the purchased land, and the city was further transformed into the suburban area it is today.

=== Hobo festival ===
Because of the presence of the railroad and the influx of drifters, Kirby received the nickname the "Hobo Capital of Texas." Officials discovered this fact in 2007 and planned for a "Hobo festival."

The city held its first annual "hobo festival" during the first weekend of May 2008, including a "hobo parade" through the streets and the crowning of a hobo King and Queen. Through the years, musical acts such as Wade Hayes and Darrell McCall performed at the event. It continued annually until 2019, when officials cancelled it due to some residents' dislike of the term "hobo". Other residents have vowed to bring back the festival in the future. The state of the festival has become a political issue in the city.

== Government ==
Kirby is characterized as a "home rule" city as permitted under Texas law. The city can govern itself, and mandate ordinances and actions as long as they do not infringe on state or federal law. The government is set up by the 1988 City Charter that calls for a legislative body of six members (city council) and a mayor that heads the legislative body and represents the city. The current mayor is Janeshia Grider. The charter also identifies a city manager to be directed by the council, and accountable for the operation of the city.

There are two animal shelters in the city. The City of Kirby has its own animal shelter. Bexar County Animal Care, which covers unincorporated areas in Bexar County, also maintains its animal shelter in Kirby. The county facility has 60 kennels. In 2026, Katie Bartlett of the San Antonio Express-News stated that the county shelter "is chronically overcrowded." In 2026 the county announced it would build a new shelter in southwest Bexar County.

== Education ==
Residents of Kirby are zoned to Judson Independent School District.

They are zoned to :

- Hopkins Elementary School
- Kirby Middle School
- Karen Wagner High School

=== Northern Kirby ===
The northern section of the city contains the Kirby Manor and Old Town neighborhoods. It includes Kirby Middle School, Old Seguin Road, FM 78, Gibbs Sprawl Road, and the Southern Pacific railroad tracks. A consistent population of homeless people live under the 410 overpass.

=== Southern Kirby ===
The southern section of the city contains Hopkins Elementary School, named after longtime principal Joseph Hopkins. This area of the city is divided between a strictly agricultural sector between Hopkins Elementary and Candlewood Elementary and the homes of the astronaut streets on the other side of Binz Engleman Road. Ackerman is the main road here; it leads to Interstate 10.

=== Community sector ===
Kirby is characterized as strictly a suburban area of San Antonio. Kirby has its own fire and police departments. The City Hall is located on Bauman Street. This is also where Kirby Municipal Court is located. The Police Department and New Fire Station are located on Ackerman Rd. The city has two parks on both sides of Binz Engleman separated by Ackerman. The western half of the park consists of mostly baseball fields, and the eastern section is accommodated with a full range of recreational activities.

=== Natural resources ===
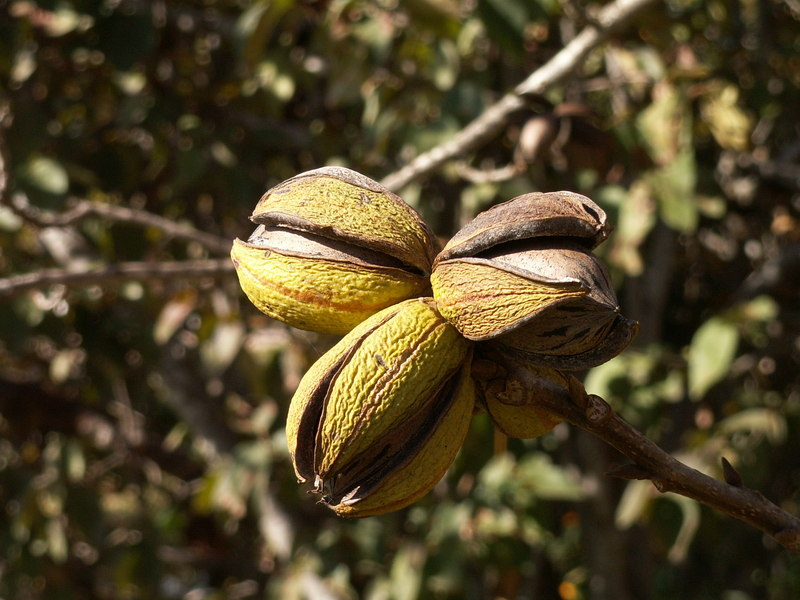
Pecan trees are common throughout Kirby.

Kirby is a major producer of pecans, which grow naturally in the soil. Pecans produce in large quantities between September and November. Certain trees do not produce every four years; 1996, 2000, and 2004 were all years with low pecan production.

Rosillo Creek is the main water stream in Kirby. It once provided the farmers in the agricultural sector with water to irrigate their crops. The creek flows from under the railroad tracks on Gibbs Sprawl Road and further downstream divides Hopkins and Candlewood Elementaries before emptying into Salado Creek in southeastern Bexar County.

== Neighborhoods ==
The neighborhoods of Kirby include Kirby Manor, Old Town, Kirby Terrace, and the Springfield Manor (Astronaut Streets).

=== Kirby Manor ===
Kirby Manor is located within Old Seguin Road to its north, Ackerman Road to its east and Binz Engleman Road to its south. The houses of Kirby Manor were built between the 1950s and 1960s. The citizens are a mix of the native settlers in this area and the newer crowd of young people moving in from other San Antonio suburbs and urban areas to start a life. Kirby Manor's proximity to the police station on Ackerman is the main reason why this area has a lower crime rate than the other areas of Kirby.

=== Old Town ===
Old Town is located between Old Seguin Road and FM 78. Its eastern and western boundaries include Gibbs Sprawl Road and Kirby Middle School, respectively. This is the area where the first homes of Kirby were built. The area is also where Kirby City Hall, the former Kirby Post Office and the old Kirby Fire Department were located. The demographics of this area are increasingly becoming younger, but there is still a large elderly population.

=== Springfield Manor ===
Springfield Manor (Astronaut Streets) is the westernmost section of Kirby. The area is given this name due to the streets, which are named after famous astronauts. This is the newest section of Kirby and has a large population. To its north is FM 78, to its south is Swann Lane and Gordon Cooper Drive, to its west is Springfield Road and to its east is Ackerman Road.

=== Kirby Terrace ===
Kirby Terrace is across from Hopkins (formerly Kirby) Elementary, bordered on one side by Ackerman Road.
