= Southton, Texas =

- Unincorporated community
- Location within Texas Location within the United States
- Coordinates: 29°17′47″N 98°25′7″W
- Country: United States
- State: Texas
- County: Bexar
- Elevation: 509 ft (155 m)
- Time zone: UTC-6 (Central (CST))
  - Summer (DST): UTC-5 (CDT)
- Area code: 210
- GNIS feature ID: 1368846

Southon is an unincorporated community in Bexar County, in the U.S. state of Texas. According to the Handbook of Texas, the community had a population of 113 in 2000. It is located within the Greater San Antonio metropolitan area.

== History ==
Southton started as a station on the San Antonio and Aransas Pass Railway in the early 1900s, serving the Yturri-Southton oilfield. A post office was established at Southton in 1910. Southton had a population of 16 in 1910, 90 in 1946, and 113 in 1990 and 2000.

== Geography ==
Southton is located off U.S. Highway 281 on the Southern Pacific Railroad, 10 mi (16 km) southeast of Downtown San Antonio in southern Bexar County.

== Education ==
Southton had its own school in 1940. Today, the community is served by the East Central Independent School District.
