= Chris Bordano =

American football player (born 1974)

No. 56, 55
- Position: Linebacker

Personal information
- Born: December 30, 1974 (age 51); San Antonio, Texas, U.S.
- Listed height: 6 ft 1 in (1.85 m)
- Listed weight: 248 lb (112 kg)

Career information
- High school: Southwest (San Antonio)
- College: SMU
- NFL draft: 1998: 6th round, 161st overall pick

Career history
- New Orleans Saints (1998–1999); Dallas Cowboys (2000)*; Atlanta Falcons (2000)
- * Offseason or practice squad member only

Awards and highlights
- 2× Second-team All-SWC (1993, 1994); WAC defensive player of the year (1997); 2× All-WAC (1996, 1997)

Career NFL statistics
- Tackles: 125
- Sacks: 1
- Stats at Pro Football Reference

Christopher E. Bordano (born December 30, 1974) is an American former professional football player who was a linebacker in the National Football League (NFL) for the New Orleans Saints and Atlanta Falcons. He played college football for the SMU Mustangs.

== Early life ==
Bordano was born in San Antonio, Texas. He attended Southwest High School, where he played as a linebacker. As a senior, he tallied 178 tackles (100 solo) with 3 fumble recoveries. He received All-District 28-5A and Defensive Most Valuable Player honors.

He also competed in the hurdles, 100 meters, 4 × 400 metres relay and in the pole vault.

== College career ==
Bordano accepted a football scholarship from Southern Methodist University. As a freshman in 1993, he missed the first 2 contests and did not enter the starting lineup until the eighth game of the season. He recorded 63 tackles (37 solo). He had 14 tackles (one for loss) in his first start against Texas A&M University. He made 19 tackles (13 solo), one forced fumble and one pass defensed against Rice University. He had 22 tackles against Texas Tech University.

As a sophomore in 1994, he missed the final 3 games. He led the SWC Conference with an average of 13.9 tackles per game, posting 111 tackles (72 solo), 2 stops for losses and 3 fumble recoveries. He had 17 tackles (10 solo) and one forced fumble against the University of New Mexico. He made 18 tackles (14 solo) and one fumble recovery against the University of North Carolina. He ad 15 tackles (11 solo) against the University of Texas.

In 1995, he was injured during fall drills and was lost for the season. As a junior in 1996, he returned to lead his team and rank fifth in the Western Athletic Conference with 124 tackles. He had 19 tackles (10 solo) against the University of Missouri. He made 17 tackles (8 solo) against Texas Christian University.

As a senior in 1997, he started the first 6 games and the last 3 contests at middle linebacker. He led the team with 120 tackles (67 solo) and was named the Western Athletic Conference Mountain Division Defensive Player of the Year. He left ranked fifth in the SMU's career tackles list (420) and became just the tenth player in school history to be named to three All-conference teams.

== Professional career ==
=== New Orleans Saints ===
Bordano was selected by the New Orleans Saints in the sixth round (194th overall) of the 1998 NFL draft. He started 6 games as a rookie at middle linebacker and made 62 tackles (tied for eighth on the team) and 8 special teams tackles (tied for fifth on the team). He had 9 tackles against the San Francisco 49ers.

In 1999, although he was considered slow for the position, he showed enough athletic ability to start 12 games at middle linebacker and register 59 tackles. On April 26, 2000, he was traded to the Dallas Cowboys in exchange for cornerback Kevin Mathis.

=== Dallas Cowboys ===
In 2000, the Dallas Cowboys had a lot of turnover at linebacker and one of the moves made to improve the depth was trading for Bordano. He was passed on the depth chart by rookie Orantes Grant and was released to make room for cornerback Phillippi Sparks on August 28.

=== Atlanta Falcons ===
On September 7, 2000, he was signed as a free agent by the Atlanta Falcons. He appeared in 2 games as a backup, before fracturing a neck vertebra and being placed on the injured reserve list on September 19. He retired after being told by doctors that another injury on the neck could be life-threatening.
