= Boldtville, Texas =

- Unincorporated community
- Location within Texas Location within the United States
- Coordinates: 29°21′49″N 98°21′39″W
- Country: United States
- State: Texas
- County: Bexar
- Elevation: 574 ft (175 m)
- Time zone: UTC-6 (Central (CST))
  - Summer (DST): UTC-5 (CDT)
- Area code: 210
- GNIS feature ID: 1352619

Boldtville is an unincorporated community in Bexar County, in the U.S. state of Texas, located on the far east side of San Antonio. According to the Handbook of Texas, the community had a population of 20 in 2000. The population was 1,241 at the 2020 census. It is located within the Greater San Antonio metropolitan area.

== Geography ==
Boldtville is located south of US Highway 87 about 9 miles southeast of downtown San Antonio in east central Bexar County.

== Demographics ==
Historical population
Census	Pop.	Note	%±
2000	20		—
2010	1,179		5,795.0%
2020	1,241		5.3%
U.S. Decennial Census

Boldtville, Texas racial composition as of 2020 (NH = Non-Hispanic) (Note: Note: the US Census treats Hispanic/Latino as an ethnic category. This table excludes Latinos from the racial categories and assigns them to a separate category. Hispanics/Latinos can be of any race.)
Race	Number	Percentage
White or European American (NH)	549	48.12%
Black or African American (NH)	174	16.49%
Native American or Alaska Native (NH)	6	0.53%
Asian (NH)	6	0.53%
Pacific Islander (NH)	1	0.09%
Mixed/Multi-Racial (NH)	39	3.42%
Hispanic or Latino	466	40.84%
Total	1,241	

As of the 2020 United States census, there were 1,141 people, 363 households, and 306 families residing in the town.

At the 2000 census 1,247 people, 404 households, and 355 families were residing in the town. The population density was 303.0 inhabitants per square mile (117.0/km^{2}). There were 417 housing units at an average density of 101.3 per square mile (39.1/km^{2}). The racial makeup of the town was 86.93% White, 9.93% African American, 0.24% Native American, 0.08% Asian, 4.81% from other races, and 2.00% from two or more races. Hispanic or Latino of any race were 22.53%.

Of the 404 households 43.1% had children under the age of 18 living with them, 80.0% were married couples living together, 6.9% had a female householder with no husband present, and 11.9% were non-families. 9.9% of households were one person and 5.0% were one person aged 65 or older. The average household size was 3.09 and the average family size was 3.30.

The age distribution was 28.1% under the age of 18, 6.7% from 18 to 24, 25.9% from 25 to 44, 27.2% from 45 to 64, and 12.1% 65 or older. The median age was 40 years. For every 100 females, there were 98.9 males. For every 100 females age 18 and over, there were 96.5 males.

The median household income was $67,333 and the median family income was $73,125. Males had a median income of $43,482 versus $30,391 for females. The per capita income for the town was $22,745. About 2.4% of families and 3.4% of the population were below the poverty line, including 2.6% of those under age 18 and 2.2% of those age 65 or over.

== Education ==
The community continues to be served by the East Central ISD today.
