= Southwest High School (San Antonio, Texas) =

Location
- 11914 Dragon Lane; San Antonio, Bexar County, Texas 78252; United States; 29.308202°N 98.673407°W

Information
- School type: Public high school
- Motto: We are Southwest!
- Established: 1951
- School district: Southwest Independent School District
- NCES School ID: 484095004658
- Principal: Amanda Wagner
- Teaching staff: 139.55 (on an FTE basis)
- Grades: 9–12
- Enrollment: 2,200 (2023–2024)
- Student to teacher ratio: 15.76
- Colors: Green & White
- Athletics conference: UIL Class AAAAAA
- Mascot: Dragons
- Website: Southwest High School website

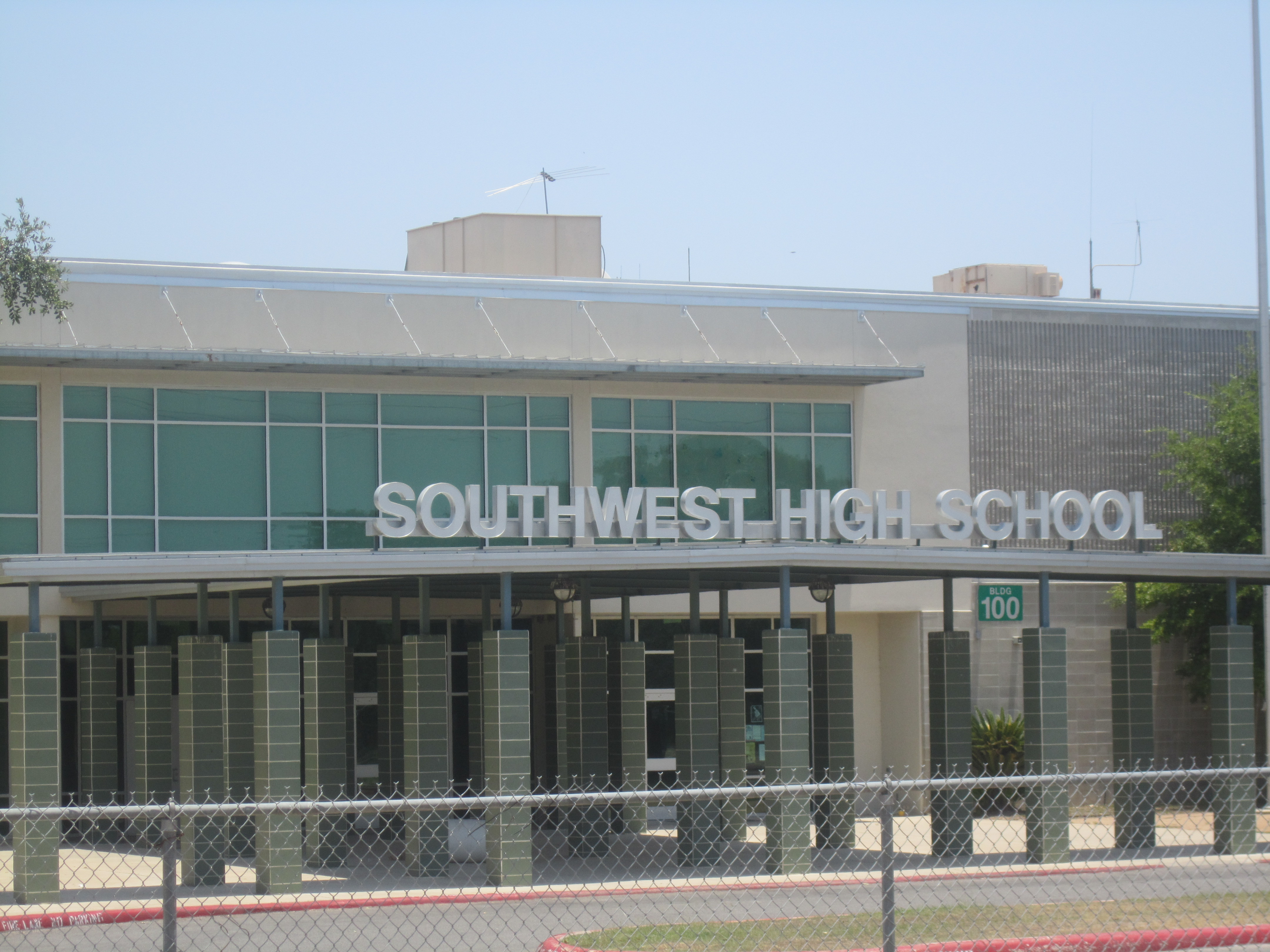
Southwest High School front entrance

Southwest High School is a 6A public high school in the Southwest Independent School District of San Antonio, Texas, USA. For the 2024–25 school year, the school was given a "B" by the Texas Education Agency.

== History ==
Southwest High School has been serving southwestern Bexar County for over 68 years. Established in 1951, it has grown from a small rural high school with a graduating class of 11 students to a major 6A high school with over 2,000 students.

== Organizations ==
The Dragons participate in UIL District 28 6A competitions for Academic Team, Athletics, Band, Drama, Choir, Color Guard, and Dance. Other co-curricular and extra-curricular opportunities include NJROTC, National Honor Society, Best Buddies, Student Council, FFA, TAFE, DECA, Skills USA, FCCLA, and Academic Decathlon along with a FIRST Robotics program.

== Athletics ==
The Southwest Dragons compete in the following sports:

- Baseball
- Basketball
- Cross Country
- Football
- Golf
- Powerlifting
- Soccer
- Softball
- Swimming and Diving
- Tennis
- Track and Field
- Volleyball
- Waterpolo

== Academics ==
Southwest High School offers a complete academic program including 18 dual credit classes, in association with Palo Alto College, as well as Advanced Placement classes in Science and English.

== Notable alumni ==
- Ty Detmer, Heisman Trophy winning quarterback who played in the National Football League for twelve seasons
- Chris Bordano, former American football linebacker in the National Football League
- Shea Serrano, New York Times bestselling author and writer.
- Destinee Hooker, 2012 summer Olympic volleyball athlete for Team USA. She won silver medal, but got best Spiker award for the 2012 summer Olympics.
