= Mitchell Lake (San Antonio) =

Lake in Bexar County, Texas, United States

- Location within Texas Location within the United States
- Location: San Antonio, Texas, United States
- Coordinates: 29°16′15″N 98°29′16″W
- Basin countries: United States
- Surface area: 600 acres (2.4 km^{2})
- Surface elevation: 522 ft (159 m)

Mitchell Lake is a small lake in the southern part of San Antonio that encompasses approximately 600 acres (2.4 km^{2}) within its city limits, in southern Bexar County in the US state of Texas. It was used as a waste management center for the city but has since fallen under San Antonio Water System control. A redevelopment effort has started on the lake with the openings of golf courses and parks. These efforts aim to change the perceptions of people in the South Texas area who associate the lake with uncleanliness. The lake is beloved by birdwatchers who enjoy the sights of many species of bird that live on or around the lake. In 2004, the National Audubon Society entered into a lease with San Antonio Water System to manage the 1,200-acre site.

== History ==
The Spanish first utilized the lake in the early 18th century to water their cattle. They called it the "Lake of the Ducks" because of the bounty of ducks that dwelt nearby. The Mitchell family of San Antonio owned the lake in the 19th century and used it for fowl hunting. The city purchased the lake in 1901 for waste management, and as early as the 1970s, efforts began to protect the lake and its rare birds.

== Geography ==
Northern part of the confluence of Medina River and Leon Creek. Mitchell Lake is a natural drainage between Balcones Fault zone just north of Luling fault zone. A watershed that drains into Mitchell Lake is 9.76 square miles.

== Wildlife ==
This lake is a diverse ecosystem with a combination of grassland, wetlands, ponds, woodlands, and brush lands. The vegetation is populated with many native plants such as morning glory, aster, lantana, agave, blue mist flower, and live oak. This lake is a route for many migratory birds. Including white pelicans, yellow-billed cuckoo, and roseate spoonbills.
