= Fratt, Texas =

Coordinates: 29°31′03″N 98°23′49″W

Fratt, Texas was a flag station and farming settlement of mostly German settlers in northeastern Bexar County, Texas, United States, near the intersections of Interstate 35 and Loop 410 in San Antonio on the city's northeastern side. It was founded shortly before 1900, and in the 1930s had amenities such as a store and church. The population had declined to 25 people by late 1946, and by the 1960s was so depopulated that it was no longer found on maps.
