= Karen Wagner High School =

Karen J. Wagner High School

Location
- 3000 North Foster Road; San Antonio, Bexar County, Texas 78244; United States; 29.456623°N 98.357036°W

Information
- Type: Free Public
- Established: 2005
- School district: Judson Independent School District
- NCES School ID: 482499010445
- Principal: Blas Arce
- Faculty: 164.38 (on an FTE basis)
- Grades: 9–12
- Student to teacher ratio: 13.53
- Colors: Red and black
- Athletics: Football, Basketball, Cross Country, Wrestling, Track, Volleyball, Golf, Baseball, Softball, Soccer, Tennis
- Athletics conference: District 27-6A
- Nickname: Thunderbirds
- Website: wagner.judsonisd.org/o/wagner

Karen J. Wagner High School is a high school in unincorporated Bexar County, Texas, United States. It is operated by the Judson Independent School District. The school has a San Antonio address but is not within the San Antonio city limits. For the 2024-2025 school year, the school was given a "C" by the Texas Education Agency.

The school was named after Lieutenant Colonel Karen J. Wagner, a United States Army officer and a 1979 Judson High School graduate who was killed when an airplane hijacked by terrorists flew into the Pentagon on September 11, 2001.

== Sports ==
The school's sports teams are known as the Thunderbirds.

== Fine arts ==
The Wagner Marching Band won the USSBA TX State Championship three years in a row (2010, 2011, 2012). They won first place at all of their competitions for the 2011-2012 marching season. In 2011, the band went to the B.O.A. San Antonio Super Regional for the first time in its history, and placed 24th out of 72 bands. In 2012, they beat out over 120 bands and were named the Grand National Champion of the USBands Open National Championships, at Meadowlands Stadium in East Rutherford, NJ with a score of 97.52.

In the spring of 2010, the Wagner Color Guard (Crimson Precision) won State Championships (1st place) in the Novice class. They performed to "Glitter In The Air" by Pink.

In the spring of 2007, the Sabre Dancers dance team won first place in every group routine entered, and won Grand Champions on South Padre Island.

== Other programs ==
Other programs include Academic Decathlon (AcaDec), Business Professionals of America (BPA), Gay Straight Alliance (GSA), Theatre Arts, various clubs (Club De Español, French Club, Poetry Club, etc.), Army Junior Reserve Officers' Training Corps (JROTC), and FCCLA.

== Notable alumni ==
- Marlon Smith (2008) — CFL player
- Jordan Clarkson (2010) — NBA player
- André Roberson (2010) — NBA player
- Derrick Kindred (2012) — NFL player
- Amber Ramirez (2016) — basketball player
- Kiana Williams (2017) — WNBA player
- Spencer Burford (2018) — NFL player
- Kevin McCullar Jr. (2018) — NBA player
