= Destinee Hooker =

American volleyball player (born 1987)

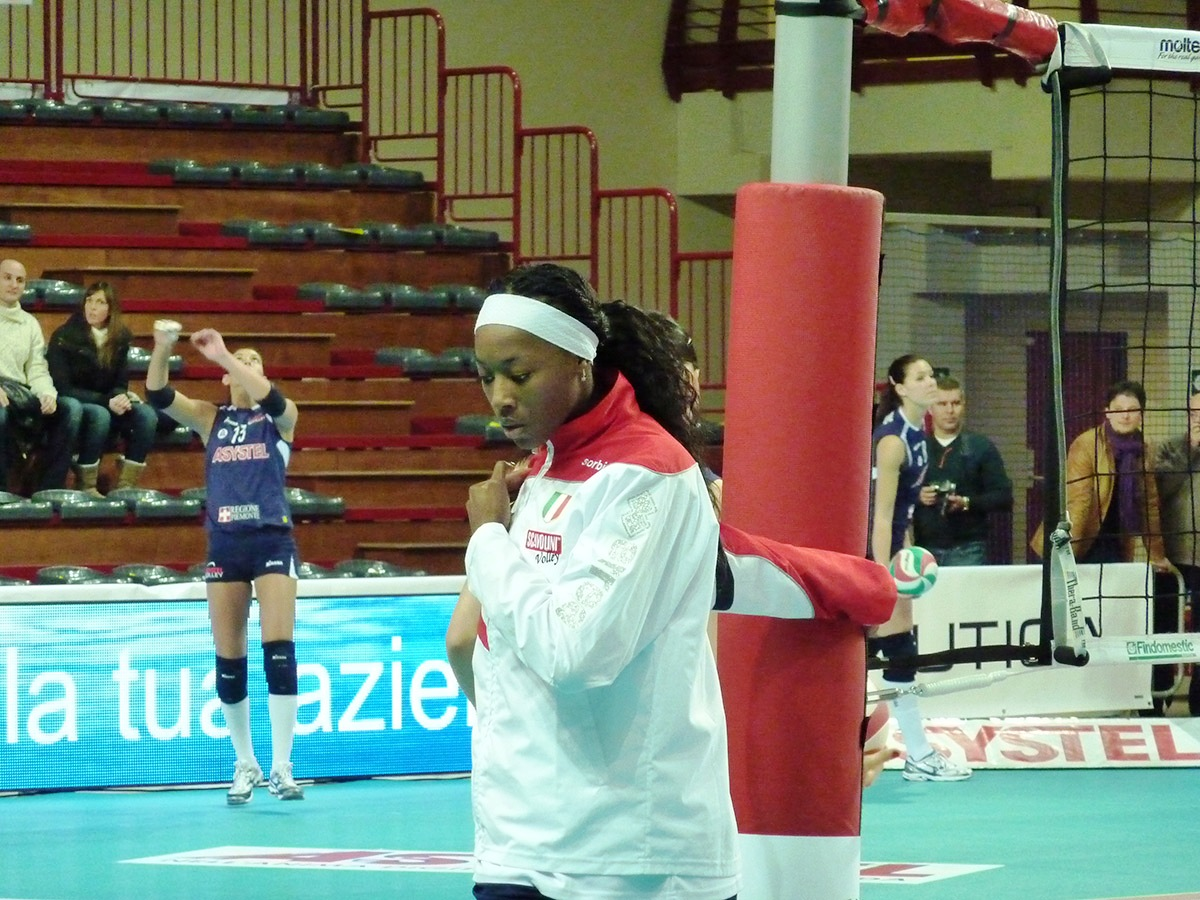

Personal information
- Full name: Destinee Dante Hooker
- Nationality: American
- Born: September 7, 1987 (age 39); Frankfurt, Germany
- Hometown: San Antonio, Texas, United States
- Height: 6 ft 3 in (1.91 m)

Volleyball information
- Position: Opposite
- Current club: (Puerto Rico) San Juaneras de la Capital
- Number: 19 (national team)

Career
Years	Teams
2006–2009; 2010; 2010; 2010–2011; 2011–2012; 2012–2013; 2014; 2014–2015; 2016; 2016–2018; 2018–2019; 2019-2020; 2020-2021	(United States) University of Texas (South Korea) GS Caltex Seoul KIXX (Puerto Rico) Pinkin de Corozal (Italy) Scavolini Pesaro (Brazil) Osasco Voleibol Clube (Russia) Dinamo Krasnodar (Puerto Rico) Criollas de Caguas (South Korea) Hwaseong IBK Altos (China) Tianjin Bridgestone (Brazil) Camponesa Minas (Brazil) Osasco Voleibol Clube (China) Tianjin Bohai Bank (Puerto Rico) San Juaneras de la Capital

National team
2008–2012	United States
Medal record
Women's volleyball
Representing the United States
Olympic Games
Silver medal – second place	2012 London	Team
FIVB Volleyball Women's World Cup
Silver medal – second place	2011 Japan	Team
FIVB Volleyball World Grand Prix
Gold medal – first place	2010 Ningbo	Team
Gold medal – first place	2011 Macau	Team
NORCECA Championship
Gold medal – first place	2011 Caguas

Destinee Dante Hooker (born September 7, 1987) is an American indoor volleyball player. She is a 6 ft 4 in (1.93 m) opposite attacker. Hooker was a member of the United States women's national volleyball team. She starred in both volleyball and track and field at the University of Texas.

== Career ==
=== High school ===
Hooker attended Southwest High School in San Antonio, Texas, where she was a standout athlete in basketball, track and field, and volleyball. As a junior and senior, she was an all-state volleyball outside hitter. She was also the 2004 and 2005 Texas state champion in the high jump.

=== College ===
Hooker played on the University of Texas volleyball team from 2006 to 2009. In 2007, she was named to the AVCA All-American second team. She was then named to the first team in both 2008 and 2009. In 2009, she was the Big 12 Player of the Year and the NCAA Division I volleyball championship's Most Outstanding Player, as Texas lost to Penn State in the finals. While at Texas, Hooker was named as one of the four finalists for the Honda Sports Award in volleyball for both the 2008–09 season as well as the 2009–10 season.

In track and field, Hooker won the NCAA outdoor high jump championship in 2006, 2007, and 2009. She also won the NCAA indoor high jump championship in 2009; her winning jump of 6 ft 6 in (1.98 m) broke the indoor collegiate record. She won four NCAA high jump championships overall.

At the 2008 Olympic Trials, she came in 6th place, missing the Olympic team by one jump after not matching her career high at that point.

=== International ===
Hooker joined the U.S. women's national volleyball team in January 2008. Her first official tournament with the team was the 2010 World Grand Prix, where she helped the U.S. win the gold medal by averaging 4.76 points and 2.46 digs. She was also fifth in scoring at that year's FIVB Volleyball Women's World Championship. In 2011, Hooker was named the Most Valuable Player of the FIVB World Grand Prix, as the Americans won the tournament again. She ranked second with 101 points scored during the Final Round. Hooker averaged 5.91 points and 5.13 kills in the FIVB World Cup to help the U.S. to the silver medal in that event. She was named the Best Spiker in the World Cup with a 49.53 kill percent and .419 hitting efficiency.

Hooker played in the first six matches of the 2012 FIVB World Grand Prix, which the U.S. eventually won. Hooker then won the silver medal with the U.S. in the 2012 Summer Olympics. She ranked second overall in scoring in that tournament and won the Best Spiker award.

== Personal ==
Hooker was born in Frankfurt, Germany, and resides in San Antonio, Texas. Her sister, Marshevet Hooker, is a track and field athlete who competed in the 2008 Summer Olympics.

== Awards ==
=== Individual ===
- 2011 World Grand Prix "Most Valuable Player"
- 2011 World Cup "Best Spiker"
- 2012 Summer Olympics "Best Spiker"
- 2016/17 Brazilian Superliga "Best Spiker"

=== Club ===
- 2011–12 Superliga - Champion, with Sollys/Nestlé (Osasco)
- 2012–13 CEV Women's Challenge Cup - Champion, with Dinamo Krasnodar

=== College ===
- 2008, 2009 AVCA All-America first team
- 2007 AVCA All-America second team
- 2009 Most Outstanding Player at the NCAA Division I Tournament
- 2008, 2009 NCAA Championship All-Tournament team
- 2008–09 Big 12 Conference Female Athlete of the Year
- 2008–09 Finalist for Honda Sports Award (volleyball)
- 2009–10 Finalist for Honda Sports Award (volleyball)
- 2009 Big 12 Player of the Year

Awards
Preceded by (United States) Foluke Akinradewo	Most Valuable Player of FIVB World Grand Prix; 2011	Succeeded by (United States) Megan Hodge
