= Cottage Hill, Texas =

Settlement in Bexar County, Texas, US

Coordinates: 29.3727°N 98.1999°W

Cottage Hill was a settlement that once existed in eastern Bexar County, Texas, United States.

== History ==
=== The beginning ===
In the 1840s the Irvin family settled at the 18 mile marker on the San Antonio to Gonzales road. Soon after, D. A. Saltmarsh established there a stagecoach stop. In 1855, two wealthy speculators, Gideon Lee and Joseph Beck, purchased land and laid out a town called Cottage Hill. Henry Bowers opened the 20 mile house just east of town, soon William A. Jackson opened a general store and was the first postmaster.

=== Post Civil War - incidents of violence ===
After the end of the Civil War Cottage Hill became known for lawlessness and violence. In 1876 a well known gunfight happened in Cottage Hill, in which Tom Secrest and William Irvin were killed, James Applewhite of La Vernia was brought before a grand jury but was released. A gang of 12 young men who robbed and terrorized the area called themselves the Cottage Hill gang. In 1877 John Humphrey was ambushed bringing mail from San Antonio and died a day later. This incident caused the post office to be transferred to nearby Saint Hedwig. The result was a steady decline of Cottage Hill as businesses moved to Saint Hedwig.

== Present Day ==
As of 2021, only forgotten ruins and gravestones remain where the town of Cottage Hill once stood.
