= Southwest Independent School District =

School district in Texas, United States

Southwest Independent School District is a public school district located in southwestern Bexar County, Texas, United States.

The district covers a 115-square-mile (300 km^{2}) area that includes portions of the city of San Antonio and Von Ormy.

In 2009, the school district was rated "academically acceptable" by the Texas Education Agency.

== History ==
In 2023 its enrollment was around 13,000. At that time the district's population was increasing, prompting it to open more schools.

== Programs ==
In 2018 a program for aeronautical sciences for all grade levels debuted.

== Schools ==
=== High school (Grades 9-12) ===
- CAST STEM High School
- Southwest High School
- Southwest Legacy High School

=== Middle schools (Grades 6-8) ===
All four of SWISD's middle schools are named for astronauts aboard the Space Shuttle Challenger when it disintegrated after takeoff.

- Christa McAuliffe - National Blue Ribbon School of Excellence in 1999-2000
- Ronald McNair
- Francis Scobee
- Judith A. Resnik

=== Elementary schools (Grades PK-5) ===
- Big Country Elementary
- Bob Hope Elementary
- Elm Creek Elementary
- Hidden Cove STEAM Academy
- Indian Creek Elementary
- Juan Alvarado Elementary School
- Kriewald School of Arts
- Medio Creek Elementary
- Southwest Elementary
- Sun Valley Elementary
- Spicewood Park Elementary
