= Live Oak, Texas =

City in Bexar County, Texas, United States

- City
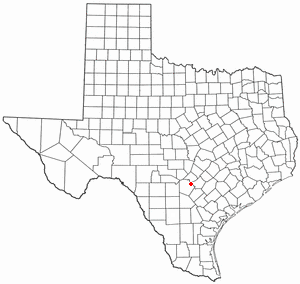
- Location of Live Oak, Texas

- Coordinates: 29°33′2″N 98°20′18″W
- Country: United States
- State: Texas
- County: Bexar
- Established: 1960

Government
  - Type: Council-Manager
  - City Council: Mayor Mary M. Dennis; Aaron Dahl; Mendell Morgan, Jr. Robert "Bob" Tullgren (Mayor Pro-Tem); Dr. Erin Perez; Ed Cimics
  - City Manager: Anas Garfaoui

Area
  - Total: 4.80 sq mi (12.43 km^{2})
  - Land: 4.76 sq mi (12.32 km^{2})
  - Water: 0.042 sq mi (0.11 km^{2})
- Elevation: 912 ft (278 m)

Population (2020)
  - Total: 15,781
  - Density: 3,468.4/sq mi (1,339.14/km^{2})
- Time zone: UTC-6 (Central (CST))
  - Summer (DST): UTC-5 (CDT)
- ZIP codes: 78148, 78233
- Area codes: 210, 726 (planned)
- FIPS code: 48-43096
- GNIS feature ID: 1340230
- ANSI Code: 2410847
- Website: liveoaktx.net

Live Oak is a city in Bexar County, Texas, United States. The population was 15,781 at the 2020 census. It is part of the San Antonio - New Braunfels metropolitan area.

== Geography ==
According to the United States Census Bureau, Live Oak has a total area of 4.7 square miles (12 km^{2}), of which 4.7 square miles (12 km^{2}) is land and 0.04 square miles (0.10 km^{2}) (0.64%) is water.

== Demographics ==
Historical population
Census	Pop.	Note	%±
1970	2,779		—
1980	8,183		194.5%
1990	10,023		22.5%
2000	9,156		−8.7%
2010	13,131		43.4%
2020	15,781		20.2%
U.S. Decennial Census

As of the 2020 census, Live Oak had a population of 15,781 residents. The median age was 37.2 years, with 21.3% of residents under the age of 18 and 15.6% aged 65 years or older. For every 100 females there were 92.3 males, and for every 100 females age 18 and over there were 90.0 males age 18 and over.

=== Racial and ethnic composition ===
Racial composition as of the 2020 census
Race	Number	Percent
White	7,505	47.6%
Black or African American	2,213	14.0%
American Indian and Alaska Native	140	0.9%
Asian	719	4.6%
Native Hawaiian and Other Pacific Islander	73	0.5%
Some other race	1,567	9.9%
Two or more races	3,564	22.6%
Hispanic or Latino (of any race)	6,470	41.0%

=== 2020 census ===
There were 6,418 households in Live Oak, of which 30.0% had children under the age of 18 living in them. Of all households, 42.1% were married-couple households, 20.3% were households with a male householder and no spouse or partner present, and 30.0% were households with a female householder and no spouse or partner present. About 30.7% of all households were made up of individuals and 9.5% had someone living alone who was 65 years of age or older.

There were 6,862 housing units, of which 6.5% were vacant. The homeowner vacancy rate was 1.0% and the rental vacancy rate was 8.3%.

Every resident of Live Oak lived in an urban area, while none lived in a rural area according to the 2020 census.

== Climate ==
The climate in this area is characterized by hot, humid summers and generally mild to cool winters. According to the Köppen Climate Classification system, Live Oak has a humid subtropical climate, abbreviated "Cfa" on climate maps.

== Education ==
Live Oak is divided between two school districts: Judson Independent School District and North East Independent School District.

The NEISD portion of Live Oak is zoned to Royal Ridge Elementary School, White Middle School, and Roosevelt High School.

== See also ==
- List of municipalities in Texas
