= Universal City, Texas =

City in Texas, United States

City of Universal City
- City
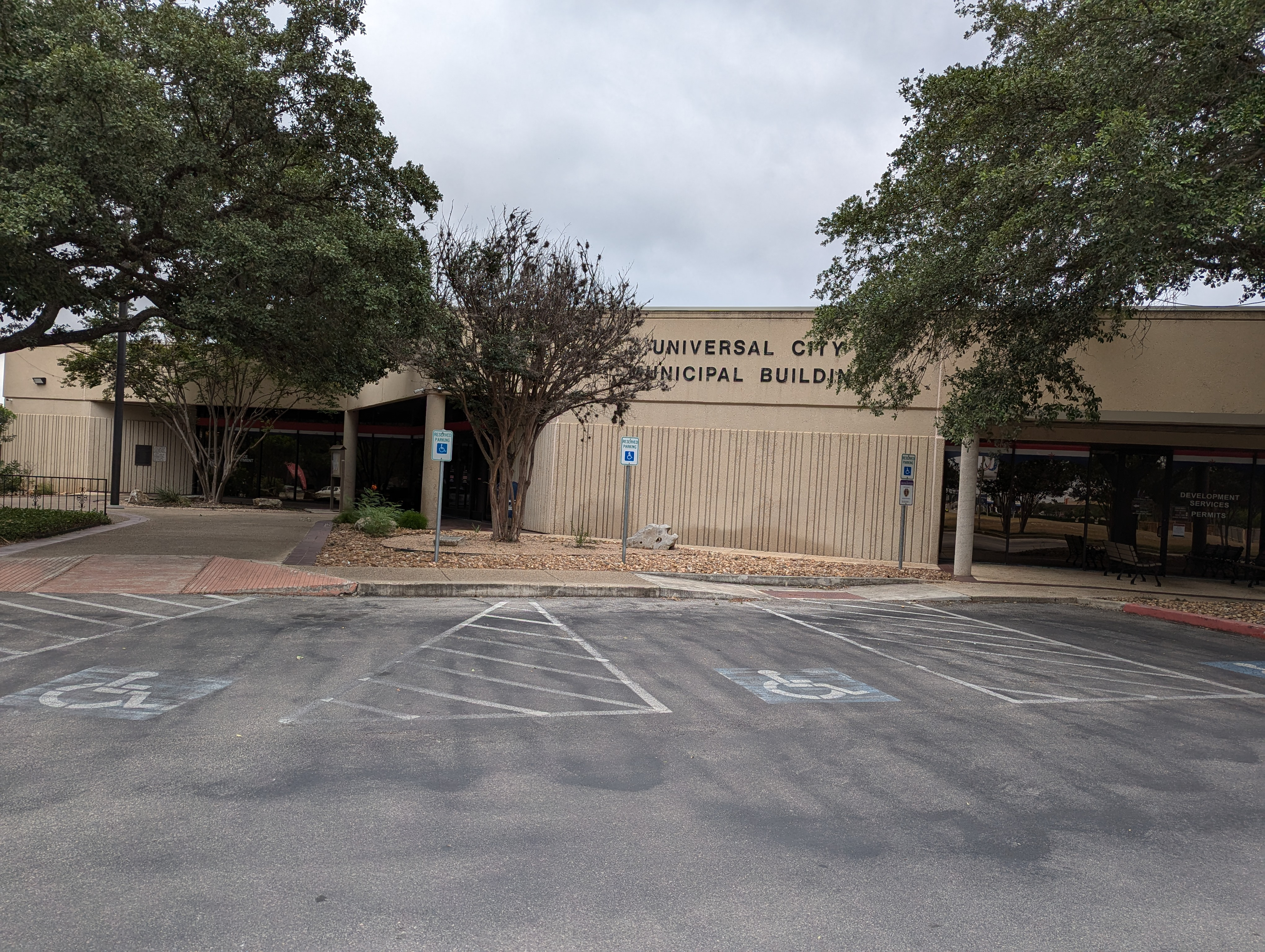
- Universal City Municipal Building and City Hall
- Motto: "The Gateway to Randolph AFB"
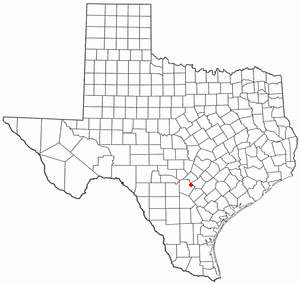
- Location of Universal City, Texas

- Coordinates: 29°33′10.381″N 98°18′27.274″W
- Country: United States
- State: Texas
- County: Bexar and Guadalupe

Government
  - Type: Council–manager
  - Mayor: Tom Maxwell
  - City Council: Christina Fitzpatrick; Ashton Bulman; Bear Goolsby; Bernard Rubal; Phil Vaughan; Lori Putt
  - City Manager: Kim Turner

Area
  - Total: 5.59 sq mi (14.49 km^{2})
  - Land: 5.57 sq mi (14.43 km^{2})
  - Water: 0.023 sq mi (0.06 km^{2})
- Elevation: 764 ft (233 m)

Population (2020)
  - Total: 19,720
  - Density: 3,750.6/sq mi (1,448.12/km^{2})
- Time zone: UTC-6 (Central (CST))
  - Summer (DST): UTC-5 (CDT)
- ZIP codes: 78148, 78154
- Area codes: 210, 726
- FIPS code: 48-74408
- GNIS feature ID: 1349101
- Website: www.universalcitytexas.gov

Universal City is a city in Bexar County, Texas, United States, with a small portion in Guadalupe County. It is a suburb of San Antonio to the northeast, and is adjacent to Randolph Air Force Base. The city also borders Schertz, Texas to its east, Selma to its north, Live Oak to its west, and Converse to its southwest. The population was 19,720 at the 2020 census. It is part of the San Antonio Metropolitan Statistical Area.

== History ==
The earliest portion of what would later become Universal City, Texas was platted on January 30, 1931. Universal City was later incorporated as a home-rule city on April 20, 1960. The main transportation corridor running through Universal City is Pat Booker Road (State Highway 218), the commercial thoroughfare of the city.

== Geography ==
The mean center of Universal City is located at 29°33′10.381″N 98°18′27.274″W (29.552883698, –98.307576166). This is approximately 15 miles (24 km) northeast of downtown San Antonio.

According to the United States Census Bureau, the city has a total area of 5.7 square miles (15 km^{2}), all land.

A portion of the property of Randolph Field extends beyond the limits of the titular census-designated place, into the Universal City city limits.

== Demographics ==
Historical population
Census	Pop.	Note	%±
1970	7,613		—
1980	10,720		40.8%
1990	13,057		21.8%
2000	14,849		13.7%
2010	18,530		24.8%
2020	19,720		6.4%
U.S. Decennial Census

=== 2020 census ===
As of the 2020 census, there were 19,720 people, 7,900 households, and 5,159 families residing in the city.

The median age was 37.7 years. 22.6% of residents were under the age of 18 and 16.8% of residents were 65 years of age or older. For every 100 females there were 93.2 males, and for every 100 females age 18 and over there were 90.8 males age 18 and over.

100.0% of residents lived in urban areas, while 0.0% lived in rural areas.

There were 7,900 households in Universal City, of which 32.3% had children under the age of 18 living in them. Of all households, 44.5% were married-couple households, 19.3% were households with a male householder and no spouse or partner present, and 28.9% were households with a female householder and no spouse or partner present. About 27.6% of all households were made up of individuals and 8.7% had someone living alone who was 65 years of age or older.

There were 8,427 housing units, of which 6.3% were vacant. The homeowner vacancy rate was 1.5% and the rental vacancy rate was 8.7%.

Racial composition as of the 2020 census
Race	Number	Percent
White	10,405	52.8%
Black or African American	2,033	10.3%
American Indian and Alaska Native	226	1.1%
Asian	726	3.7%
Native Hawaiian and Other Pacific Islander	109	0.6%
Some other race	1,978	10.0%
Two or more races	4,243	21.5%
Hispanic or Latino (of any race)	7,809	39.6%

=== 2010 census ===
As of the census of 2010, 18,530 people, 7,575 households, and 4,973 families resided in the city. The population density was 3,321.4 inhabitants per square mile (1,282.4/km^{2}). The 8,036 housing units averaged 1,120.5 per square mile (432.6/km^{2}). The racial makeup of the city was 75.4% White, 10.1% African American, 0.70% Native American, 2.9% Asian, 0.3% Pacific Islander, 6.3% from other races, and 4.2% from two or more races. Hispanics or Latinos of any race were 32.3% of the population.

Of the 7,575 households, 29.3% had children under the age of 18 living with them, 47% were married couples living together, 4.5% had a male householder with no wife present, 14.1% had a female householder with no husband present, and 34.3% were not families. About 27.8% of all households were made up of individuals living alone, and 7% had someone living alone who was 65 years of age or older. The average household size was 2.45 and the average family size was 3.00.

In the city, the population was distributed as 27.1% from age 0 to 19, 7.5% from 20 to 24, 26.7% from 25 to 44, 26.1% from 45 to 64, and 12.7% who were 65 years of age or older. The median age was 36.1 years. For every 100 females, there were 98 males.

The median income for a household in the city was $51,900, and for a family was $61,066. The per capita income for the city was $26,019. About 13.7% of families and 17.6% of the population were below the poverty line, including 25.3% of those under age 18 and 11.3% of those age 65 or over.

== Education ==
Universal City is divided between the Schertz-Cibolo-Universal City Independent School District and the Judson Independent School District. Randolph Field Independent School District has a Universal City postal address, but does not actually include any part of the Universal City city limits; that district covers the Randolph Air Force Base census-designated place.

Universal City is also home to two private K–12 schools: First Baptist Academy of Universal City (FBA); and Calvary Chapel Christian Academy (CCCA), a tuition-free institution.

The Universal City Public Library is in the city.

Northeast Lakeview Community College, a campus of the Alamo Colleges, is located in Universal City.

== See also ==
- List of municipalities in Texas
