= Judson Independent School District =

School district in Texas

Location
- Live Oak, Texas, USA Region 20

District information
- Type: Public

Judson Independent School District (Or JISD) is a public school district based in Live Oak, Texas (USA).

Judson Independent School District covers 55.87 square miles (144.7 km^{2}) and serves the incorporated cities of Converse, Kirby, and Selma as well as portions of Live Oak, Universal City and San Antonio.

In 2009, the school district was rated "academically acceptable" by the Texas Education Agency.

On November 18, 2011, June Adair was elected school board president, replacing Jose Macias.

== Schools ==
=== High schools (Grades 9-12) ===
- Judson High (Converse) - opened 1959
- Karen Wagner High (Bexar County) - opened 2005
- Judson Early College Academy (Live Oak) - opened 2009
- Judson Learning Academy (Converse)
- Veterans Memorial High (Bexar County) - opened 2016

=== Middle schools (Grades 6-8) ===
- JSTEM Academy (Converse)
- Judson Middle (Converse)
- Kirby Middle (San Antonio)
- Kitty Hawk Middle (Universal City)
- Metzger Middle (San Antonio)
- Woodlake Hills Middle (San Antonio)
- Cibolo Creek Middle School(San Antonio)

=== Alternative schools ===
- Judson Secondary Alternative School

=== Elementary schools ===
- Grades PK-5
  - Candlewood Elementary (Bexar County)
  - Converse Elementary (Converse)
  - Coronado Village Elementary (Universal City) Opened in August 1972
  - Ed Franz Elementary (Live Oak)
  - Escondido Elementary (Converse) - Opened 2017
  - Hartman Elementary (San Antonio)
  - Hopkins Elementary (Kirby)
  - Park Village Elementary (San Antonio)
  - Paschall Elementary (San Antonio)
  - Masters Elementary (Bexar County)
  - Wortham Oaks Elementary (Bexar County) - Opened 2018
- Grades K-5
  - Crestview Elementary (Live Oak)
  - Copperfield Elementary (Converse) Opened in August 2014
  - Elolf Elementary (Converse)
  - Miller's Point Elementary (Converse)
  - Olympia Elementary (Universal City)
  - Salinas Elementary (Universal City)
  - Spring Meadows Elementary (Bexar County)
  - Woodlake Elementary (Bexar County)
  - Rolling Meadows Elementary (San Antonio)
- Grades K-6
  - Selma Elementary School (Selma)
