= Von Ormy, Texas =

City in Bexar County, Texas, United States

- City
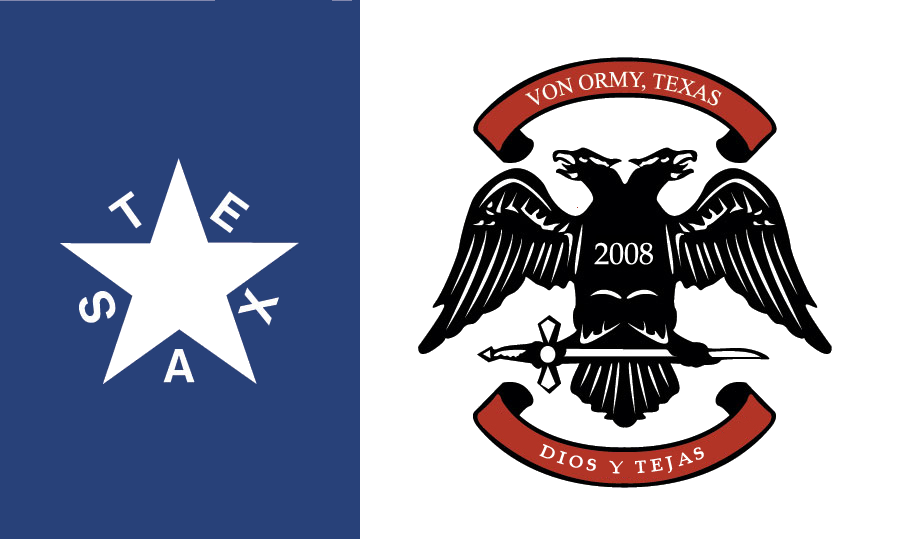
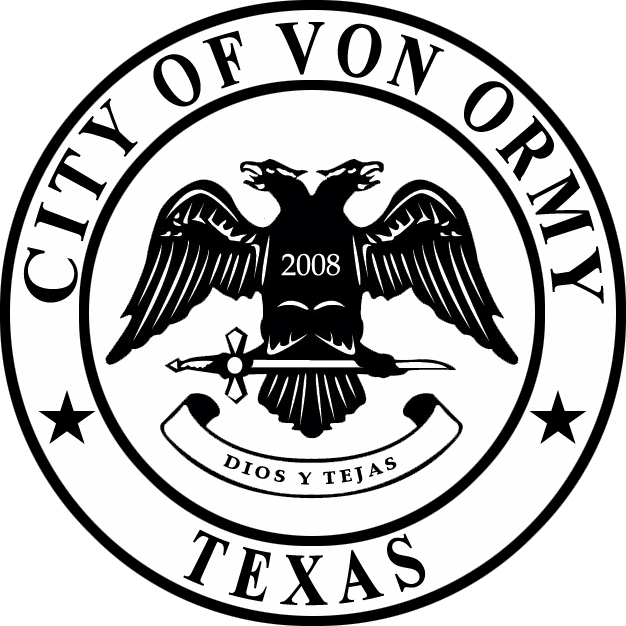
- Flag Seal
- Motto: Dios y Tejas (Spanish for "God and Texas")
- Location in the state of Texas
- Coordinates: 29°16′39″N 98°39′27″W
- Country: United States
- State: Texas
- County: Bexar
- Founded: 1827 by Blas Herrera
- Incorporated: May 30, 2008
- Named for: Count Norbert Von Ormay

Government
  - Type: Type C general law municipality
  - City commissioner: Sally Ann Martinez
  - City commissioner: Alex Quintanilla

Area
  - Total: 1.90 sq mi (4.92 km^{2})
  - Land: 1.89 sq mi (4.89 km^{2})
  - Water: 0.012 sq mi (0.03 km^{2})
- Elevation: 614 ft (187 m)

Population (2020)
  - Total: 1,174
  - Density: 681.4/sq mi (263.09/km^{2})
- Time zone: UTC-6 (Central)
  - Summer (DST): UTC-5 (Central)
- ZIP Code: 78073
- Area codes: 210, 726
- FIPS code: 48-75764
- GNIS feature ID: 2500157
- ANSI Code: 2500157
- Website: vonormytx.gov

Von Ormy (/vɒn ˈɔːrmi/ von OR-mee) is a city in southwest Bexar County, Texas, United States. As of the 2020 census, it had a population of 1,174. It is part of the San Antonio metropolitan area.

== Description ==
The city has been known as Von Ormy since the late 1880s. Prior to 1880, the community was known as "Mann's Crossing", "Garza's Crossing", "Medina Crossing", and "Paso de las Garzas". The former settlements of Kirk and Bexar were absorbed into Von Ormy by the early 1900s.

== History ==
=== Early history ===
Archeological findings show that Von Ormy has had continuous human habitation for an estimated 8,000 years. Spanish explorers encountered bands of Payaya, Pastia, and other Coahuiltecan Indians living in the area of present-day Von Ormy. During the 18th century, Lipan Apache and Comanche displaced the earlier native peoples along the Medina River valley. The Medina River and its tributaries were a source of food, flint, and other resources that drew natives to their banks.

European settlers, initially Franciscan missionaries and Spanish and mestizo soldiers, arrived in the region in the early 18th century, intent on subduing and proselytizing the natives. Canary Islanders arrived soon after to settle the nearby town of Bejar (modern day San Antonio). They began to raise cattle along the Medina River and were involved in the cattle trade between Spanish Louisiana and South Texas. Notable among these were the Ruiz, Perez, Navarro, Hernandez, and Casillas families. Manuel Ruiz de Pesia founded the earliest known cattle ranch in present-day Von Ormy in the mid-1760s. In 1809, Ignacio Perez received a massive land grant south of the Medina River. A ranch house complex was built at the present site of the Von Ormy Castle. In 1813, during the Mexican War of Independence, the Battle of the Medina was fought nearby. Antonio López de Santa Anna served as a lieutenant and became familiar with the area during this campaign. In 1827, Blas Maria Herrera, who married into the Ruiz family, established the first permanent settlement with his wife in the area. Early records of Von Ormians can be found in the baptismal, burial, and marriage records of Mission San Jose and Mission Espada; they are usually listed as living "on the Medina" or simply "Medina". By the early 19th century, Von Ormy was an established community, serving as the crossing point of the Medina along the Camino Real.

=== The Texas Revolution ===
During the War for Texas Independence, Santa Anna (now the Mexican president and general-in-chief) camped in the future site of the town prior to making his final march on the Alamo. This spot is marked by the "Santa Anna Oak," a large live oak under which the general encamped. The tree is 12 ft. in diameter at the base and has been estimated by UTSA as over 600 years old. The site is now inhabited by the Alamo River Resort, a camping and fishing park. At 2:00am on June 16, 2021, the tree collapsed into 3 different sections.

Blas María Herrera, sometimes referred to as the "Paul Revere of Texas," rode his horse from Laredo to San Antonio to warn the town of Santa Anna's approach. Other area residents who served in the Texian Army include Bernardindo Ruiz, Jose Maria Ruiz, Hemergildo Ruiz, Juan Casillas, and Juan Martinez. Ignacio Perez remained loyal to Mexico.

=== Republic of Texas and early statehood ===
After the war, the doors to the Alamo were taken to the Herrera ranch, where they stayed until 1984, when the Daughters of the Republic of Texas brought them back to the Texas shrine during their restoration of the Alamo. The historic Ruiz-Herrera family cemetery was established shortly after the war and is the burial place of Blas Herrera, as well as Francisco Antonio Ruiz, who was alcalde, or mayor, of San Antonio during the siege of the Alamo.

The Republic of Texas began to issue overlapping land titles to Texas veterans on the Ignacio Perez Grant of 1809. This eventually led to a series of court cases that dispossessed the Perez family of their land.

During the Republic of Texas, the ranches along the Medina began to flourish. The first Catholic church in Von Ormy had been established on the ranch of Blas Herrera between 1836 and 1841. In 1866, it was rebuilt by Bishop Odin of Galveston as Santisima Trinidad Mission and was located at Garza's Crossing on the Medina River. Ruins of the church can be seen today, and the historic cemetery is being eroded by the river.

In the 1850s, Miguel de la Garza operated a ferry across the Medina River on the Herrera Ranch. At this time, the town became known as Garza's Crossing or Paso de las Garzas.

=== Civil War and Reconstruction ===
Secession sentiment was mixed in the area. Von Ormy in 1861 was settled mainly by German and Mexican Catholics, who largely opposed secession and supported Sam Houston's Union Democrat ticket. In 1861, locals organized a cavalry company known as the Medina Guards. Reflecting the local population, it was roughly half Tejano and half Anglo/German. Nearly all of the Medina Guards transferred to the 2nd Texas Cavalry, when their unit was set to transform into an infantry unit. They saw action in the New Mexican theater, including the Battle of Glorieta Pass. A company of Texas state troops was permanently encamped in Von Ormy during the war to patrol and protect San Antonio from Comanche raids.

Leading up to the Civil War, San Antonio merchant Enoch Jones, who was then the wealthiest man in Texas, acquired one of the overlapping land grants on the south bank of the Medina River. There, he built a fortified ranch house adjacent to the old Ignacio Perez hacienda house, locally known as "the Castle on the Medina". Jones opposed secession and believed that his political views would hurt sales at his general store in Main Plaza, so he sold it and dedicated the remainder of his life to building the Castle on the Medina. He died in 1863, and soon thereafter, his estate went into bankruptcy. Most of the land in the Von Ormy area was sold off to pay debts, but Elizabeth Jones and her sister lived in the Castle until the mid-1880s.

Following the war, Von Ormy became a hub for trade as the North experienced a shortage of beef. Cattle drives originating in South Texas drew a new wave of immigrants from northern Mexico, which was then experiencing its own war. Families such as the Flores, Vara, and Reyes arrived during this era from Coahuila, originally as cowboys and ranch hands.

The town's post office opened as "Garza's Crossing" on January 16, 1872, under postmaster William G. M. Samuel. It was closed May 7, 1874, but was reestablished June 10, 1875, under new postmaster Robert J. Sibert. It was again discontinued August 16, 1875. On January 14, 1879, a new post office was reopened using the name "Mann's Crossing", with postmaster Anton F. Krause. This, too, was closed (November 9, 1880). It was again reestablished under postmaster Branson Bywater on September 13, 1886. On December 4, 1886, the post office changed its name to "Von Ormy", which has since remained the town's designation.

Members of the Ruiz family participated in organization of the Republican Party of Bexar County, along with the other former Union Democrats, members of the occupying Union Army and Texas freedmen. Rafael Quintana arrived in the area following the Civil War as a band leader in the Union Army. He had served as San Antonio city treasurer in the closing days of the Civil War.

=== Jim Crow and the Gilded Age ===
The end of Reconstruction reestablished a racially defined order in San Antonio. Many leading Tejano families left the city and moved to their rural ranches to avoid the discrimination and hostility in the city.

Rafael Quintana moved to Von Ormy, where he was elected justice of the peace and later county commissioner. During this early era of post-Reconstruction Jim Crow laws, he was the only Hispanic judge and commissioner in Bexar County. He established a court along the rail line in Von Ormy, which soon became the town center.

In 1886, the "castle" was sold to Count Norbert Von Ormay, a count of the Austro-Hungarian Empire, for whom the city was named. Count Von Ormay arrived with his wife and servants from Prussia in the early 1880s. He registered a cattle brand at the Bexar County Courthouse and was often cited in the San Antonio Evening Light's gossip page. Many years later, his son emerged in Brazil. The castle was sold to hotel magnate T.B. Baker.

The International–Great Northern Railroad built a rail line on the western edge of the Francisco A. Ruiz Ranch in 1886 and renamed the town "Medina Station". By 1900, the railroad used the name "Von Ormy" once again. Over the next few decades, the population of Garza's Crossing shifted closer to the rail line.

In January 1906, the first steel bridge over the Medina River at Von Ormy was built by the International–Great Northern Railroad.

Texas Ranger and judge W. G. M. Samuel, who lived in Von Ormy in his later years, was often quoted in local newspapers as stating that the last major Indian battle in Bexar County occurred in Von Ormy.

During the 1900s, the Von Ormy Cottage tuberculosis sanitarium was built in the city.

The Von Ormy school operated from the early 1900s until 1956, when it closed after the creation of the Southwest Independent School District.

In 1914, the town had two grocers, a general store, a cotton gin, and a population of 350.

=== Hurricane of 1919 ===
Santisima Trinidad Church was washed away by the Great Hurricane of 1919, and a new church was built by Franciscan missionaries in the 1910s about a mile upstream along the new Laredo Highway's crossing of the Medina River. Against much local protesting, this old stone church was destroyed when the Laredo Highway was widened to create U.S. Route 81 (now Interstate 35) during the 1930s. The current church was built in the 1960s and renamed Sacred Heart of Jesus.

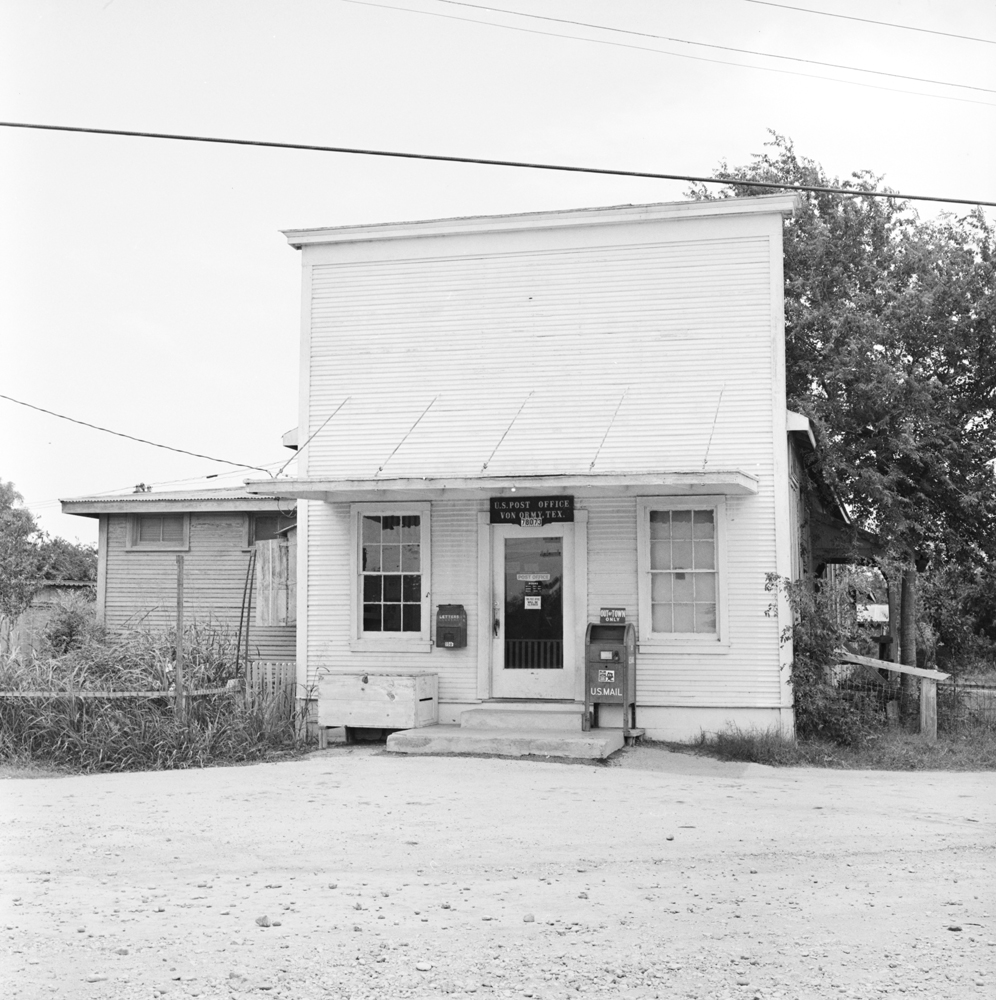
U.S. post office in Von Ormy in 1970

=== Incorporation ===
In the summer of 2006, a group of Von Ormy residents organized a series of public meetings in Von Ormy concerning the future of the community, the lack of basic public services and possible solutions to these problems. Support for the creation of a City of Von Ormy was expressed by attendees at these three meetings. To pursue this community desire, the Committee to Incorporate Von Ormy (CIVO), a Texas nonprofit association, was organized. In addition to residential members, CIVO included over 20 commercial members representing nearly all local businesses.

CIVO received written endorsements of County Judge Nelson Wolff, County Commissioner "Chico" Rodriguez, Congressman Ciro Rodriguez, State Rep. David McQuade Leibowitz, State Sen. Carlos Uresti, and San Antonio City Councilman Phil Cortez.

CIVO filed the necessary petition to the City of San Antonio to allow an election for incorporation within its extraterritorial jurisdiction. Following a series of negotiations with the City of San Antonio Planning Department, the petition was amended on August 15, 2007, to reflect agreed-upon city limits. Von Ormy received the endorsement of the planning commission on January 23, 2008. On January 31, 2008, the San Antonio City Council passed a resolution to allow Von Ormy to hold an election on incorporation. On May 10, 2008, voters approved the proposition to create the City of Von Ormy by a vote of 88%.

Under the leadership of Mayor Trina Reyes, Von Ormy was described by residents as a 'failed' libertarian experiment—the police department lost accreditation, the volunteer fire department collapsed, three councillors were arrested. Reyes resigned saying "This is one of the worst things I've ever done".

=== City of Von Ormy ===
In 2008, Art Martinez de Vara became the first mayor of Von Ormy, becoming one of the youngest mayors in the United States. He is a sixth-generation Von Ormian.

Martinez de Vara's tenure is notable for its four consecutive annual tax cuts of 10% each. The formation of the city of Von Ormy spurred a movement of suburban city formation in South Texas.

In 2010, TV personality Chris Marrou was appointed associate municipal judge of Von Ormy.

=== Von Ormy today ===
Von Ormy was home to a budding South Texas film industry centered around the Von Ormy Film Commission. In 2013, the San Antonio Express-News declared Von Ormy the "Farm Film Capitol of South Texas". As of 2020, the Von Ormy Film Commission was dissolved and no longer operates.

According to an interview with Mayor Sally Martinez in 2019, a substantial portion of city government is funded with revenues from area sales tax, and a smaller amount of revenue generated from traffic citations on I-35.

== Geography ==
Von Ormy lies along the Medina River at the crossing point of the historic Upper Laredo Camino Real. The city is now crossed by Interstate 35, with access from exits 140 and 141. I-35 leads 15 miles (24 km) northeast to downtown San Antonio and 143 miles (230 km) southwest to Laredo.

== Demographics ==
Historical population
Census	Pop.	Note	%±
2010	1,085		—
2020	1,174		8.2%
U.S. Decennial Census

=== 2020 census ===
Racial composition as of the 2020 census
Race	Number	Percent
White	536	45.7%
Black or African American	10	0.9%
American Indian and Alaska Native	15	1.3%
Asian	5	0.4%
Native Hawaiian and Other Pacific Islander	0	0.0%
Some other race	218	18.6%
Two or more races	390	33.2%
Hispanic or Latino (of any race)	1,030	87.7%

As of the 2020 census, Von Ormy had a population of 1,174 people, 382 households, and 210 families. The median age was 36.4 years, 26.7% of residents were under the age of 18, and 16.8% of residents were 65 years of age or older. For every 100 females there were 93.1 males, and for every 100 females age 18 and over there were 94.8 males age 18 and over.

Of the 382 households, 43.5% had children under the age of 18 living in them. Of all households, 42.7% were married-couple households, 22.3% were households with a male householder and no spouse or partner present, and 30.1% were households with a female householder and no spouse or partner present. About 20.4% of all households were made up of individuals and 10.2% had someone living alone who was 65 years of age or older.

There were 421 housing units, of which 9.3% were vacant. The homeowner vacancy rate was 0.4% and the rental vacancy rate was 3.1%.

0.0% of residents lived in urban areas, while 100.0% lived in rural areas.

=== 2010 census ===
At the 2010 United States census 1,085 people, 336 households, and 236 families were residing in the city. The racial makeup of the city was 70.5% White (12.9% non-Hispanic White), 0.5% Native American, 0.4% African American, 0.4% Asian, 27.1% from other races, and 1.2% from two or more races. Hispanics or Latinos of any race were 86.4% of the population.

== See also ==
- List of municipalities in Texas
