= Southside Independent School District =

School district in Texas, United States

Southside Independent School District is a public school district located in southern Bexar County, Texas (USA). It serves the far south side of the city of San Antonio.

In 2009, the school district was rated "academically acceptable" by the Texas Education Agency.

== Origins ==
Southside ISD began as a $1 sale of land to Bexar County from Julian C. Gallardo for the purpose of education.

== Schools ==
- Southside High School
- Menchaca Early Childhood Center
- Julius L. Matthey Middle School
- Losoya Middle School
- Heritage Elementary School
- Freedom Elementary School
- Julian C. Gallardo Elementary School
- W.M. Pearce Elementary School
