= Bexar County, Texas =

County in Texas, United States

- County
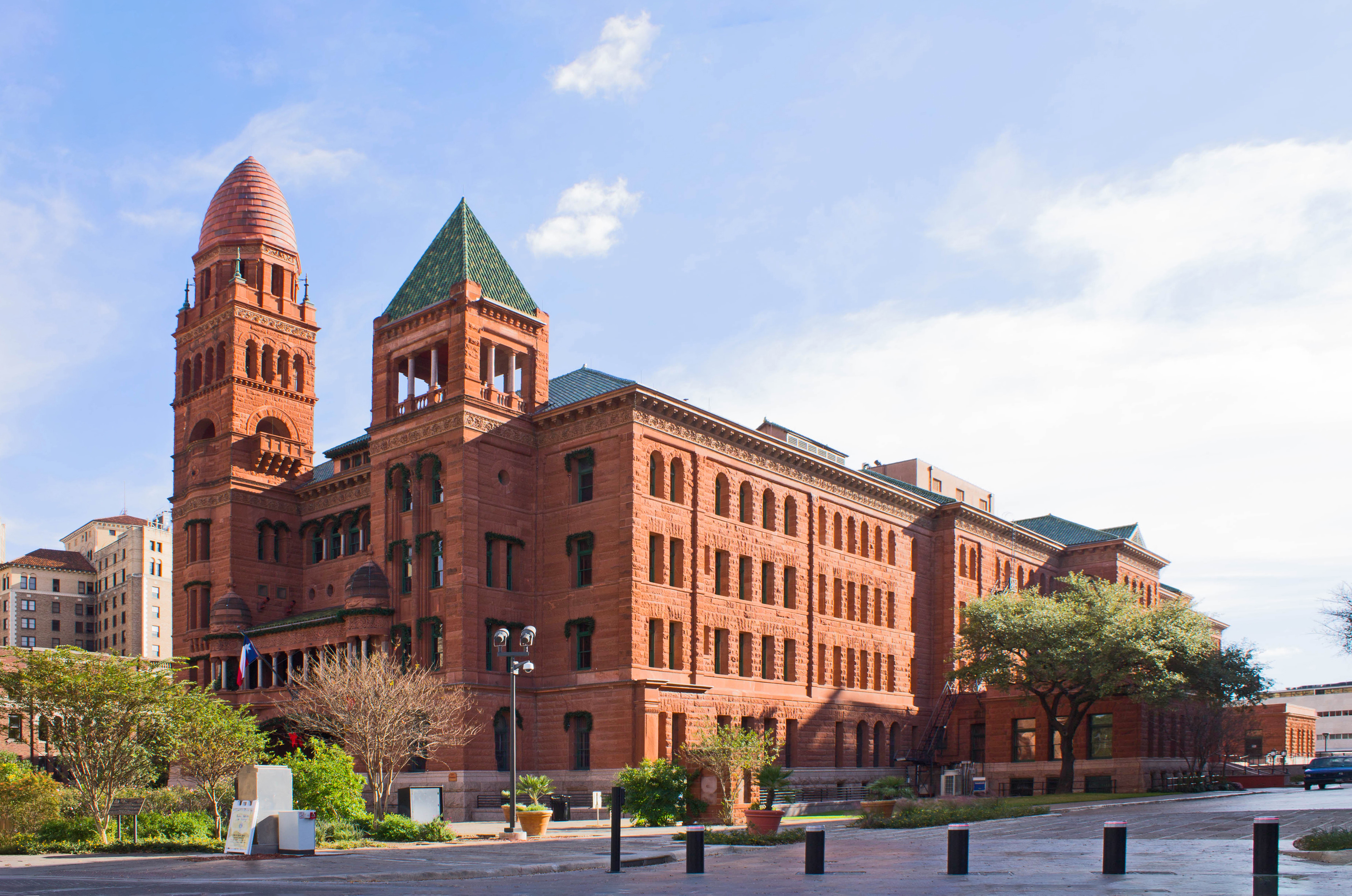
- The Bexar County Courthouse in San Antonio

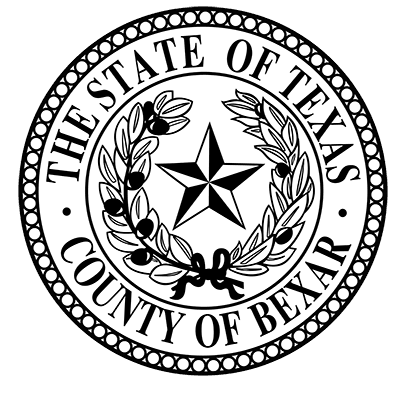
- Flag Seal

- Location within the U.S. state of Texas
- Coordinates: 29°27′N 98°31′W
- Country: United States
- State: Texas
- Founded: December 20, 1836
- Named for: Presidio San Antonio de Béxar
- Seat: San Antonio
- Largest city: San Antonio

Area
  - Total: 1,256 sq mi (3,250 km^{2})
  - Land: 1,240 sq mi (3,200 km^{2})
  - Water: 16 sq mi (41 km^{2}) 1.3%

Population (2020)
  - Total: 2,009,324
  - Estimate (2025): 2,160,088 ▲
  - Density: 1,620/sq mi (626/km^{2})

GDP
  - Total: $159.589 billion (2024)
- Time zone: UTC−6 (Central)
  - Summer (DST): UTC−5 (CDT)
- Congressional districts: 20th, 21st, 23rd, 28th, 35th
- Website: www.bexar.org

Bexar County (/bɛər/ BAIR or /ˈbeɪər/ BAY-ər; Spanish: Béxar [ˈbexaɾ]) is a county in the U.S. state of Texas. It is in South Texas and its county seat is San Antonio.

As of the 2020 census, the population was 2,009,324, making it the state's fourth-most populous county and the 16th-most populous county in the nation. Bexar County is included in the San Antonio–New Braunfels, TX metropolitan statistical area. Bexar County has a large Hispanic population with a significant growing African American population. African Americans make up 7.4% of Bexar County's population up from 6.9% in 2010 and still increasing. With a population that is 59.3% Hispanic as of 2020, it is Texas' most populous majority-Hispanic county and the third-largest such nationwide.

== History ==
Bexar County was created on December 20, 1836, and encompassed almost the entire western portion of the Republic of Texas. This included the disputed areas of eastern New Mexico northward to Wyoming. After statehood, 128 counties were carved out of its area.

The county was named for San Antonio de Béxar, one of the 23 Mexican municipalities (administrative divisions) of Texas at the time of its independence. San Antonio de Béxar—originally Villa de San Fernando de Béxar—was the first civil government established by the Spanish in the province of Texas. Specifically, the municipality was created in 1731 when 55 Canary Islanders settled near the system of missions that had been established around the source of the San Antonio River. The new settlement was named after the Presidio San Antonio de Béjar, the Spanish military outpost that protected the missions. The presidio, located at the San Pedro Springs, was founded in 1718 and named for Viceroy Balthasar Manuel de Zúñiga y Guzmán Sotomayor y Sarmiento, second son of the Duke of Béjar (a town in Spain). The modern city of San Antonio in the U.S. state of Texas also derived its name from San Antonio de Béjar.

== Native Americans and the Texas-Indian Wars ==
Natives that lived in the county included the Lipan Apache, Payaya, Tonkawa, and Comanche. From the early 1700s to the late 1800s, the county was a target of several raids and attacks by Native Americans, mainly Comanches and Kiowas. In 1831, a presidial company exterminated a band of Comanches in the western part of the county. In 1840, Comanches and Texans fought at the Council House Fight in what was supposed to be a peaceful meeting. On March 5, 1856, six Comanches attacked and killed two settlers on Cibolo Creek.In 1869, Kickapoos stole horses and killed settlers in the county. In 1870, Comanches killed Helotes settlers and stole horses. Also, in 1871, Indians raided the Maverick Ranch in the northwestern part of the county. The last Indian raid in the county occurred on July 9, 1873, when a raiding party of Indians and Mexicans killed settlers, including a well known Indian fighter, John Frank Green, in the northwestern part of the county, also relatively close to Helotes.

== Geography ==
According to the U.S. Census Bureau, the county has a total area of 1,256 square miles (3,250 km^{2}), of which 16 sq mi (41 km^{2}) (1.3%) are covered by water. Bexar County is in south-central Texas, about 190 miles (310 km) west of Houston and 140 miles (230 km) from both the US-Mexican border to the southwest and the Gulf of Mexico to the southeast.

The Balcones Escarpment bisects the county from west to northeast; to the north of the escarpment are the rocky hills, springs and canyons of the Texas Hill Country. South of the escarpment are Blackland Prairie and the South Texas plains. The San Antonio River rises from springs north of Downtown San Antonio, and flows southward and southeastward through the county.

=== Adjacent counties ===
- Kendall County (north)
- Comal County (northeast)
- Guadalupe County (east)
- Wilson County (southeast)
- Atascosa County (south)
- Medina County (west)
- Bandera County (northwest)

=== National protected area ===
- San Antonio Missions National Historical Park

=== State parkland ===
- Government Canyon State Natural Area

== Communities ==
=== Cities ===
==== Multiple counties ====
- Cibolo (mostly in Guadalupe County)
- Elmendorf (small part in Wilson County)
- Fair Oaks Ranch (partly in Kendall and Comal counties)
- Lytle (mostly in Atascosa County and a small part in Medina County)
- San Antonio (county seat and largest municipality) (small parts in Comal and Medina counties)
- Schertz (partly in Guadalupe and Comal counties)
- Selma (partly in Guadalupe and Comal counties)
- Universal City (small part in Guadalupe County)

==== Enclave cities ====
- Alamo Heights
- Balcones Heights
- Castle Hills
- Hill Country Village
- Kirby
- Leon Valley
- Olmos Park
- Shavano Park
- Terrell Hills

==== Bexar County only ====
- Converse
- Grey Forest
- Helotes
- Live Oak
- Sandy Oaks
- Somerset
- Von Ormy
- Windcrest

=== Towns ===
- China Grove
- Hollywood Park
- St. Hedwig

=== Census-designated places ===
- Cross Mountain
- Lackland Air Force Base
- Macdona
- Randolph Air Force Base
- Scenic Oaks
- Timberwood Park

=== Other unincorporated communities ===
- Adkins
- Atascosa
- Bexar
- Boldtville
- Buena Vista
- Cassin
- Leon Springs
- Losoya
- Martinez
- Sayers
- Southton
- Thelma

=== Former communities ===
- Cottage Hill
- Fratt
- Stone Oak
- Wetmore

== Demographics ==
Historical population
| Census | Pop. | Note | %± |
|---|---|---|---|
| 1850 | 6,052 | | — |
| 1860 | 14,454 | | 138.8% |
| 1870 | 16,043 | | 11.0% |
| 1880 | 30,470 | | 89.9% |
| 1890 | 49,266 | | 61.7% |
| 1900 | 69,422 | | 40.9% |
| 1910 | 119,676 | | 72.4% |
| 1920 | 202,096 | | 68.9% |
| 1930 | 292,533 | | 44.7% |
| 1940 | 338,176 | | 15.6% |
| 1950 | 500,460 | | 48.0% |
| 1960 | 687,151 | | 37.3% |
| 1970 | 830,460 | | 20.9% |
| 1980 | 988,800 | | 19.1% |
| 1990 | 1,185,394 | | 19.9% |
| 2000 | 1,392,931 | | 17.5% |
| 2010 | 1,714,773 | | 23.1% |
| 2020 | 2,009,324 | | 17.2% |
| 2025 (est.) | 2,160,088 | ▲ | 7.5% |
U.S. Decennial Census; 1850–2010 2010–2020

=== Racial and ethnic composition ===
Bexar County, Texas – Racial and ethnic composition Note: the US Census treats Hispanic/Latino as an ethnic category. This table excludes Latinos from the racial categories and assigns them to a separate category. Hispanics/Latinos may be of any race.
| Race / Ethnicity (NH = Non-Hispanic) | Pop 1980 | Pop 1990 | Pop 2000 | Pop 2010 | Pop 2020 | % 1980 | % 1990 | % 2000 | % 2010 | % 2020 |
|---|---|---|---|---|---|---|---|---|---|---|
| White alone (NH) | 446,540 | 496,149 | 496,245 | 519,123 | 535,732 | 45.16% | 41.86% | 35.63% | 30.27% | 26.66% |
| Black or African American alone (NH) | 68,030 | 81,356 | 95,984 | 118,460 | 147,875 | 6.88% | 6.86% | 6.89% | 6.91% | 7.36% |
| Native American or Alaska Native alone (NH) | 2,332 | 2,506 | 3,499 | 3,809 | 4,554 | 0.24% | 0.21% | 0.25% | 0.22% | 0.23% |
| Asian alone (NH) | 7,500 | 13,832 | 21,369 | 39,561 | 65,217 | 0.76% | 1.17% | 1.53% | 2.31% | 3.25% |
| Native Hawaiian or Pacific Islander alone (NH) | x | x | 947 | 1,806 | 2,726 | x | x | 0.07% | 0.11% | 0.14% |
| Other race alone (NH) | 3,487 | 2,371 | 1,500 | 2,881 | 8,218 | 0.35% | 0.20% | 0.11% | 0.17% | 0.41% |
| Mixed race or Multiracial (NH) | x | x | 16,354 | 22,175 | 54,044 | x | x | 1.17% | 1.29% | 2.69% |
| Hispanic or Latino (any race) | 460,911 | 589,180 | 757,033 | 1,006,958 | 1,190,958 | 46.61% | 49.70% | 54.35% | 58.72% | 59.27% |
| Total | 988,800 | 1,185,394 | 1,392,931 | 1,714,773 | 2,009,324 | 100.00% | 100.00% | 100.00% | 100.00% | 100.00% |

=== American Community Survey 2025 data ===
The United States Census Bureau estimated that in 2025, Bexar County’s population was 2.160.088. It was also estimated that the county's population was 24,71% Non-Hispanic White, 60,67% Hispanic or Latino, 7,84% Non-Hispanic Black, 3,81% Asian, 0,23% Native American, 0,14% Pacific Islander, and 2,59% Multiracial.

| Total | Population | Percentage |
|---|---|---|
| Non-Hispanic White | 533.826 | 24,71% |
| Hispanic or Latino | 1.310.556 | 60,67% |
| Non-Hispanic Black | 169.300 | 7,84% |
| Asian | 82.346 | 3,81% |
| Native American | 4.928 | 0,23% |
| Pacific Islander | 3.087 | 0,14% |
| Non-Hispanic Multiracial | 56.045 | 2,59% |

=== 2020 census ===
Bexar county population pyramid

As of the 2020 census, the county had a population of 2,009,324. The median age was 34.9 years. 24.7% of residents were under the age of 18 and 13.2% of residents were 65 years of age or older. For every 100 females there were 95.7 males, and for every 100 females age 18 and over there were 93.3 males age 18 and over.

The racial makeup of the county was 45.8% White, 8.0% Black or African American, 1.2% American Indian and Alaska Native, 3.4% Asian, 0.2% Native Hawaiian and Pacific Islander, 15.3% from some other race, and 26.1% from two or more races. Hispanic or Latino residents of any race comprised 59.3% of the population.

95.3% of residents lived in urban areas, while 4.7% lived in rural areas.

There were 726,886 households in the county, of which 35.0% had children under the age of 18 living in them. Of all households, 44.5% were married-couple households, 19.3% were households with a male householder and no spouse or partner present, and 28.9% were households with a female householder and no spouse or partner present. About 25.9% of all households were made up of individuals and 8.3% had someone living alone who was 65 years of age or older.

There were 794,173 housing units, of which 8.5% were vacant. Among occupied housing units, 58.7% were owner-occupied and 41.3% were renter-occupied. The homeowner vacancy rate was 1.7% and the rental vacancy rate was 10.5%.

=== 2010 census ===
As of the 2010 United States census, there were 1,714,773 people living in the county. Of those, 72.9% were White, 7.5% Black or African American, 2.4% Asian, 0.8% Native American, 0.1% Pacific Islander, 12.7% of some other race and 3.5% of two or more races. 58.7% were Hispanic or Latino (of any race).

A Williams Institute analysis of 2010 census data found there were about 6.2 same-sex couples per 1,000 households in the county.

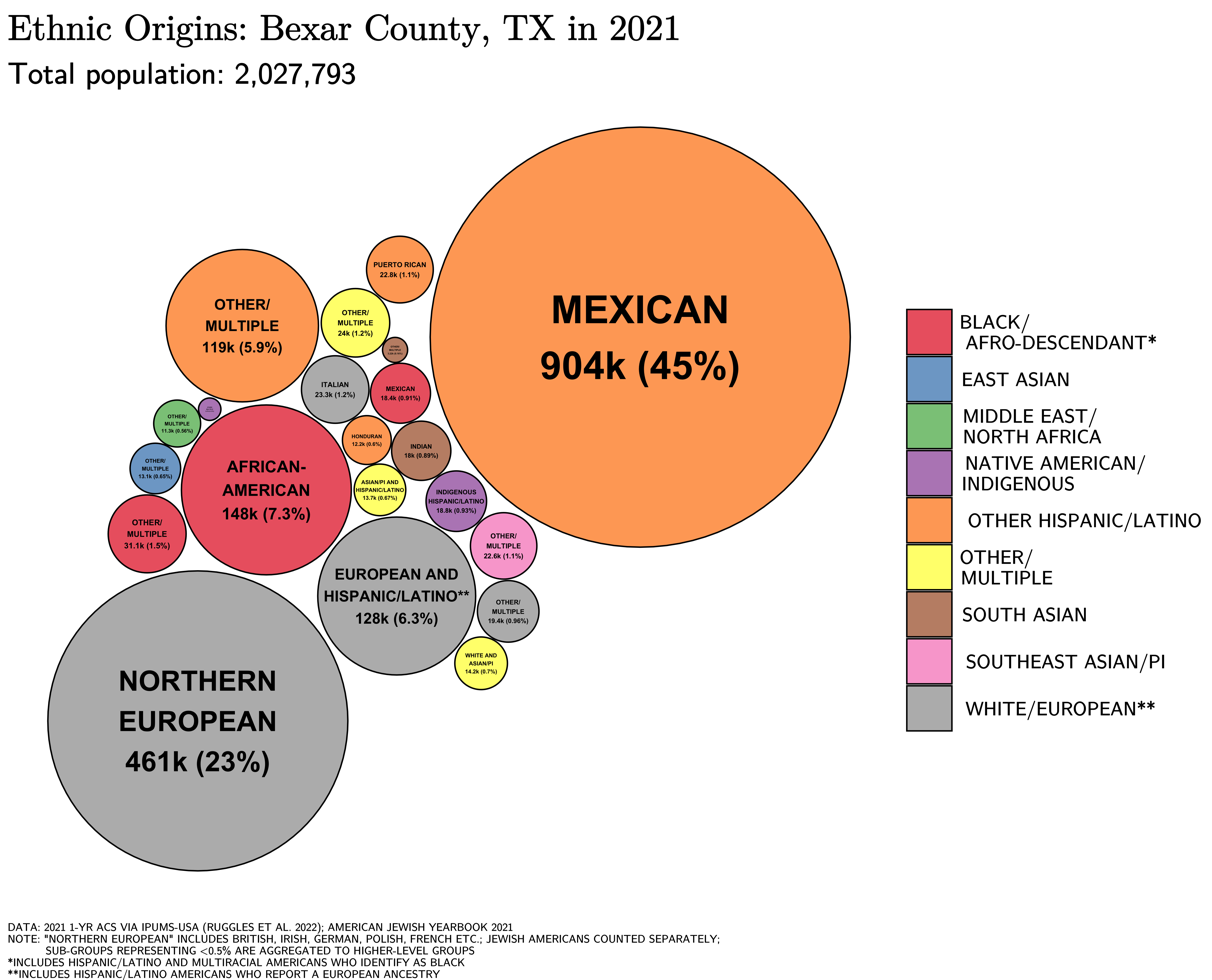
Ethnic origins in Bexar County

=== 2000 census ===
As of the 2000 census, 1,392,931 people, 488,942 households, and 345,681 families were residing in the county. The population density was 1,117 inhabitants per square mile (431/km^{2}). There were 521,359 housing units at an average density of 418 units per square mile (161/km^{2}). The racial makeup of the county was 68.86% White, 7.18% Black or African American, 0.80% Native American, 1.61% Asian, 0.10% Pacific Islander, 17.80% from other races, and 3.64% from two or more races. About 54.35% of the population were Hispanic or Latino of any race.

Of 488,942 households, 36.60% had children under the age of 18 living with them, 50.50% were married couples living together, 15.50% had a female householder with no husband present, and 29.30% were not families. About 24.00% of all households were made up of individuals, and 7.40% had someone living alone who was 65 years of age or older. The average household size was 2.78 and the average family size was 3.33.

In the county, the population was distributed as 28.50% under the age of 18, 10.70% from 18 to 24, 30.60% from 25 to 44, 19.90% from 45 to 64, and 10.40% who were 65 years of age or older. The median age was 32 years. For every 100 females, there were 94.70 males. For every 100 females age 18 and over, there were 91.20 males.

The median income for a household was $38,328, and for a family was $43,724. Males had a median income of $30,756 versus $24,920 for females. The per capita income for the county was $18,363. About 12.70% of families and 15.90% of the population were below the poverty line, including 22.40% of those under age 18 and 12.20% of those age 65 or over.

== Government ==
Bexar County is governed by a Commissioners Court, composed of four Commissioners and one County Judge, who acts as the presiding officer. The Commissioners represent their respective precincts, which are roughly equal in population and geographic area. On July 12, 2011, the Commissioners Court established the Office of the County Manager to streamline "the functions, offices and departments that report to Commissioners Court."

== Corrections ==
The Bexar County jail facilities are at 200 North Comal in downtown San Antonio, operated by the Bexar County Sheriff's Office (Javier Salazar, Sheriff). In late 2012, press reports noted an increase in the number of suicides at the facility. The issue was a topic of debate in the election for sheriff that year. The jail holds an average of about 3,800 prisoners in 2012, with a total capacity of 4,596, making it the fourth-largest in the state.

The Texas Department of Criminal Justice operates the Dominguez Unit, a state jail for men, in an unincorporated section of Bexar County.

== Education ==
School districts in the county include:

- Alamo Heights Independent School District
- Boerne Independent School District
- Comal Independent School District
- East Central Independent School District
- Edgewood Independent School District
- Floresville Independent School District
- Fort Sam Houston Independent School District
- Harlandale Independent School District
- Judson Independent School District
- Lackland Independent School District
- Medina Valley Independent School District
- North East Independent School District
- Northside Independent School District
- Randolph Field Independent School District
- San Antonio Independent School District
- Schertz-Cibolo-Universal City Independent School District
- Somerset Independent School District
- South San Antonio Independent School District
- Southside Independent School District
- Southwest Independent School District

All of the county is in the service area of Alamo Community College.

=== Libraries ===
Library systems include:

- San Antonio Public Library

On September 14, 2013, Bexar County opened BiblioTech – Bexar County's Digital Library, the nation's first bookless library.

== Transportation ==
=== Major highways ===
- I-10
- I-35
- I-37
- I-410
- US 87
- US 90
- US 181
- US 281
- SH 16
- SH 130
- SH 151
- SH 211
- SH 218
- Loop 13
- Loop 106
- Loop 107
- Loop 353
- Loop 368
- Loop 1604
- Spur 117
- Spur 122
- Spur 345
- Spur 371
- Spur 421
- Spur 422
- Spur 471
- Spur 536
- Spur 537

=== Mass transit ===
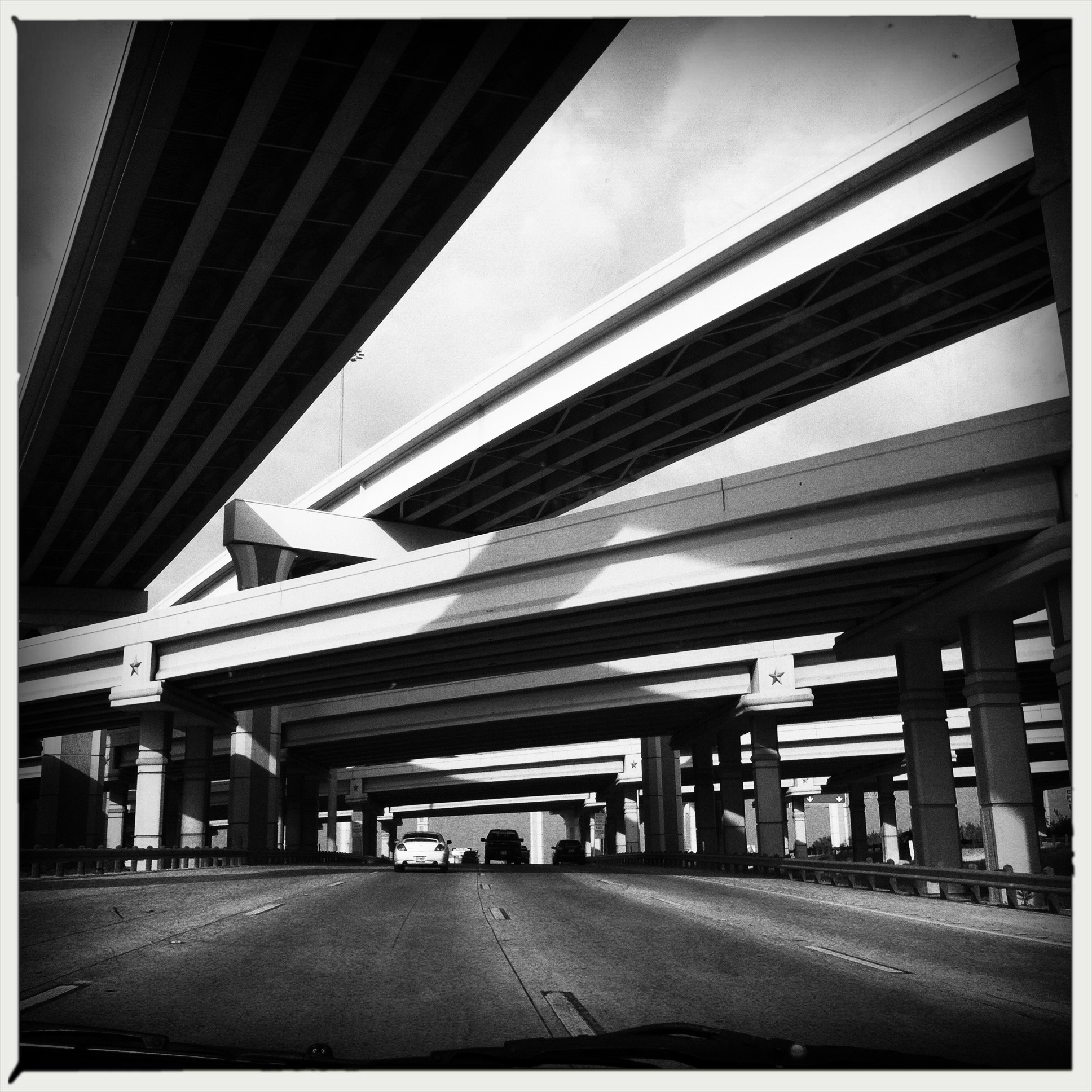
Highway 281 South, San Antonio, Bexar County

VIA Metropolitan Transit (VIA) serves San Antonio and surrounding suburbs of Bexar County.

=== Railroads ===
- Amtrak's San Antonio station is located just east of downtown San Antonio. It is served by two Amtrak lines:
  - Texas Eagle which runs daily between Chicago and San Antonio, continuing on to Los Angeles several times a week.
  - Sunset Limited which runs several times a week between Los Angeles and New Orleans.

=== Air ===
- The San Antonio International Airport is the major commercial airport serving San Antonio.

== Property taxes ==
In 2016, for the third consecutive year, Bexar County increased the appraised value of businesses and residences. Most will hence find their property taxes will increase for the year, with higher payments for some beginning as early as November 1. The latest 7.5 percent increase in valuation follows an 11 percent rise in 2015, and a 7 percent jump in 2014. The 2016 total value for all property in the county is approximately $163 billion, or $13 billion more than in 2015. County residents express dismay to Mary Kieke, the deputy chief appraiser. "People are very upset. The tax system is absolutely broken," she said.

== Military installations ==
- Brooks City-Base (decommissioned)
- Camp Bullis
- Fort Sam Houston
- Kelly Air Force Base (decommissioned)
- Lackland Air Force Base
- Randolph Air Force Base
- San Antonio Military Medical Center

== Animal services ==
Bexar County Animal Care is a division of Bexar County Public Health. The agency, which covers unincorporated areas in Bexar County and some smaller municipalities, maintains its animal shelter in Kirby. The county facility has 60 kennels. In 2026, Katie Bartlett of the San Antonio Express-News stated that the county shelter "is chronically overcrowded." In 2026 the county announced it would build a new shelter in southwest Bexar County. Groundbreaking occurred in September 2026.

San Antonio maintains its own animal shelter. The City of Kirby has its own animal shelter.

== Notable people ==
- Carol Burnett, comedian and actress, was born and grew up in San Antonio
- Joan Crawford, actress, was born in San Antonio
- Christopher Cross (born Christopher Charles Geppert), Grammy-winning, Oscar-winning, chart-topping pop music artist of the early 80s
- Dwight D. Eisenhower, 34th President of the United States; stationed at Fort Sam Houston in 1916
- Al Freeman, Jr., was born in San Antonio; he became an actor, known for ABC soap opera One Life to Live, and Malcolm X
- Rick Galindo, Republican member of the Texas House of Representatives from District 117 in Bexar County
- Mina Myoui, singer in South Korean group Twice
- Cyndi Taylor Krier, first woman and first Republican to be elected to the Texas Senate from Bexar County (1985–1993), and first woman and first Republican to be appointed as a Bexar County administrative judge (1993 to 2001)
- James Robertson Nowlin, United States District Judge for the Western District of Texas; one of the first two Republicans since Reconstruction to represent Bexar County in the Texas House of Representatives
- Ciro D. Rodriguez, member of Congress, previously 28th District, Texas, now 23rd District, Texas
- Michelle Rodriguez, actress, James Cameron's Avatar
- Robert Rodríguez, director of Spy Kids, Desperado, and Sin City
- Joe Sage, one of the first two Republicans since Reconstruction, with James Robertson Nowlin, to represent Bexar County in the Texas House of Representatives
- Alan Schoolcraft, former Republican member of the Texas House of Representatives
- Percy Sutton, former Manhattan Borough President, and civil rights attorney; clients included Malcolm X, and the owner of the Apollo Theater in Harlem and several radio stations
- Carlos I. Uresti, member of the Texas Senate from the 19th District
- Kevin Patrick Yeary, judge of the Texas Court of Criminal Appeals, effective 2015; assistant district attorney for Bexar County, 1998–2014

== Climate ==
Bexar County

Climate chart (precipitation, max. and min. temperature)
| J | F | M | A | M | J | J | A | S | O | N | D |
| 55 20 6 | 55 22 8 | 51 26 8 | 52 29 16 | 176 34 20 | 72 35 24 | 84 34 24 | 37 36 24 | 133 32 22 | 63 29 17 | 81 23 12 | 25 19 6 |
- █ Average max. and min. temperatures in °C
- █ Precipitation totals in mm
Imperial conversion
| J | F | M | A | M | J | J | A | S | O | N | D |
| 2.2 68 43 | 2.2 72 46 | 2 79 46 | 2 84 61 | 6.9 93 68 | 2.8 95 75 | 3.3 93 75 | 1.5 97 75 | 5.2 90 72 | 2.5 84 63 | 3.2 73 54 | 1 66 43 |
- █ Average max. and min. temperatures in °F
- █ Precipitation totals in inches

== Politics ==
United States Senate election results for Bexar County, Texas2
| Year | Republican | | Democratic | | Third party(ies) | |
| Year | No. | % | No. | % | No. | % |
|---|---|---|---|---|---|---|
| 2020 | 320,095 | 42.51% | 411,328 | 54.63% | 21,564 | 2.86% |
| 2026 | 208,999 | 31.34% | 445,009 | 66.72% | 12,957 | 1.94% |

Texas Gubernatorial election results for Bexar County
| Year | Republican | | Democratic | | Third party(ies) | |
| Year | No. | % | No. | % | No. | % |
|---|---|---|---|---|---|---|
| 2022 | 221,993 | 41.05% | 311,023 | 57.52% | 7,752 | 1.43% |
| 2026 | 225,462 | 33.74% | 432,086 | 64.67% | 10,640 | 1.59% |

As an urban county, Bexar County has voted for Democratic candidates in most presidential elections. From 1932 to 2012, it was a nationwide bellwether, supporting the winner in every election except 1968. Former Governor of Texas George W. Bush remains the last Republican to carry the county in presidential elections.

United States Senate election results for Bexar County, Texas1
| Year | Republican | | Democratic | | Third party(ies) | |
| Year | No. | % | No. | % | No. | % |
|---|---|---|---|---|---|---|
| 2024 | 303,262 | 39.88% | 422,903 | 55.61% | 34,298 | 4.51% |

Democrats perform well within the Connally Loop, which contains heavily Hispanic neighborhoods on the south and west sides of San Antonio, and African Americans on the east side. In recent years, Democrats have made inroads on the Northwest Side toward the University of Texas at San Antonio, and the Northeast Side toward Kirby. Republicans' strength is concentrated around the military bases plus wealthier enclaves such as Alamo Heights, Terrell Hills, and the far northern section of the county.

United States presidential election results for Bexar County, Texas
| Year | Republican | | Democratic | | Third party(ies) | |
| Year | No. | % | No. | % | No. | % |
|---|---|---|---|---|---|---|
| 1912 | 1,021 | 12.13% | 4,864 | 57.77% | 2,534 | 30.10% |
| 1916 | 5,483 | 43.13% | 7,008 | 55.12% | 223 | 1.75% |
| 1920 | 8,894 | 52.18% | 6,926 | 40.63% | 1,226 | 7.19% |
| 1924 | 9,898 | 40.07% | 10,838 | 43.88% | 3,963 | 16.05% |
| 1928 | 16,477 | 49.69% | 16,626 | 50.14% | 57 | 0.17% |
| 1932 | 7,466 | 16.37% | 37,765 | 82.83% | 363 | 0.80% |
| 1936 | 12,951 | 26.44% | 35,781 | 73.05% | 250 | 0.51% |
| 1940 | 18,270 | 32.22% | 38,214 | 67.40% | 212 | 0.37% |
| 1944 | 23,588 | 39.04% | 35,024 | 57.96% | 1,815 | 3.00% |
| 1948 | 26,202 | 39.53% | 35,970 | 54.27% | 4,107 | 6.20% |
| 1952 | 65,391 | 56.31% | 50,260 | 43.28% | 485 | 0.42% |
| 1956 | 65,901 | 58.15% | 46,790 | 41.29% | 640 | 0.56% |
| 1960 | 63,934 | 45.59% | 75,373 | 53.74% | 938 | 0.67% |
| 1964 | 53,469 | 32.90% | 108,658 | 66.86% | 393 | 0.24% |
| 1968 | 72,951 | 39.46% | 95,325 | 51.56% | 16,598 | 8.98% |
| 1972 | 137,572 | 59.76% | 91,662 | 39.82% | 959 | 0.42% |
| 1976 | 121,176 | 44.64% | 146,581 | 54.00% | 3,673 | 1.35% |
| 1980 | 159,578 | 51.73% | 137,729 | 44.65% | 11,167 | 3.62% |
| 1984 | 203,319 | 59.65% | 136,947 | 40.18% | 560 | 0.16% |
| 1988 | 193,192 | 52.25% | 174,036 | 47.07% | 2,521 | 0.68% |
| 1992 | 168,816 | 40.65% | 172,513 | 41.54% | 73,947 | 17.81% |
| 1996 | 161,619 | 44.59% | 180,308 | 49.74% | 20,562 | 5.67% |
| 2000 | 215,613 | 52.24% | 185,158 | 44.86% | 11,955 | 2.90% |
| 2004 | 260,698 | 54.85% | 210,976 | 44.39% | 3,640 | 0.77% |
| 2008 | 246,275 | 46.69% | 275,527 | 52.23% | 5,690 | 1.08% |
| 2012 | 241,617 | 46.94% | 264,856 | 51.46% | 8,237 | 1.60% |
| 2016 | 240,333 | 40.42% | 319,550 | 53.74% | 34,691 | 5.83% |
| 2020 | 308,618 | 40.05% | 448,452 | 58.20% | 13,501 | 1.75% |
| 2024 | 337,545 | 44.51% | 411,389 | 54.25% | 9,389 | 1.24% |

== Symbols ==
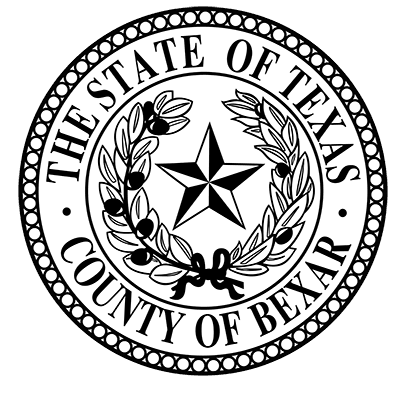
Seal of Bexar County

Coat of arms of Bexar County

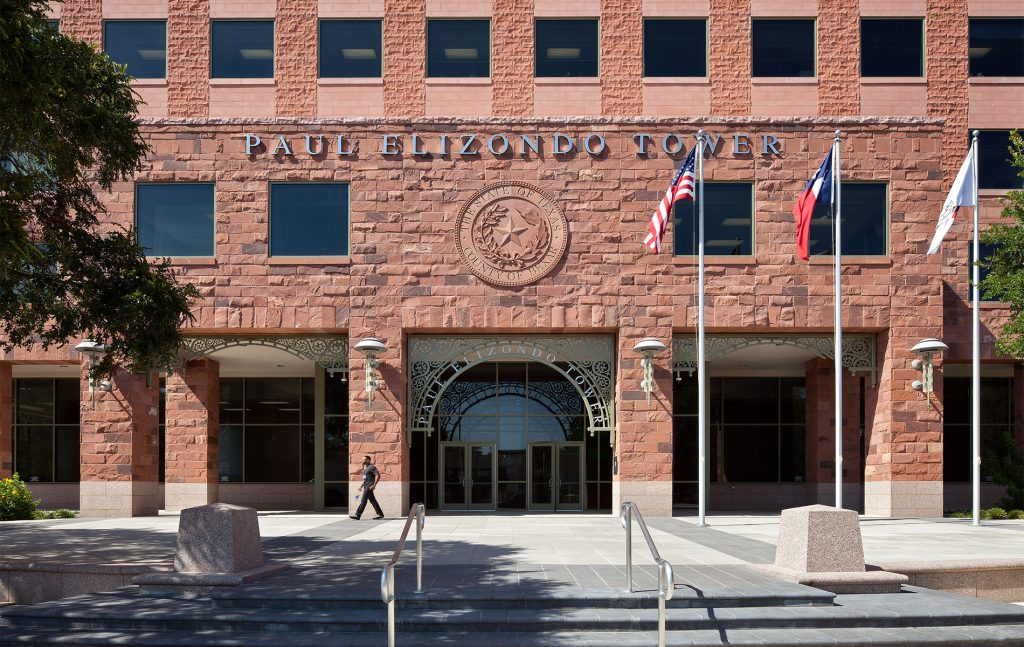
Flag of Bexar County shown on the right flagpole

The official seal of Bexar county is the Seal of Texas with the words "County of Bexar" added below "The State of Texas".

The coat of arms was adopted by Commissioners Court on December 22, 1972. It combines four heraldic fields topped with a coronet representing a duke of Spain. A banner below the heraldic fields bears the word "Bexar". In the upper left are the arms of Álvaro de Zúñiga y Guzmán, Duke of Bexar. In the upper right, Mission San Francisco de la Espada on a blue field. In the lower left, a golden eagle on a green field representing both the Aztec eagle of Mexico and the American bald eagle. In the lower right, a silver star and a canon on a red field. The cannon represents the battles for independence of the Republic of Texas as well as the Texan support of the Confederacy in the Civil War.

== See also ==
- List of museums in Central Texas
- National Register of Historic Places listings in Bexar County, Texas
- Recorded Texas Historic Landmarks in Bexar County
