= Bandera =

Bandera may refer to:

== Places ==
- Bandera County, Texas, U.S.
  - Bandera, Texas, its county seat
    - Bandera High School
  - Bandera Creek, a river, with its source near Bandera Pass
  - Bandera Pass, a mountain pass
- Bandera Mountain, Washington, U.S.
- Bandera, Santiago del Estero, Argentina, a municipality and village
- Bandera State Airport in King County, Washington, U.S.

== People ==
- Alcides Bandera (born 1978), Uruguayan footballer
- Andriy Bandera (1882–1941), chaplain and politician
- Manuel Bandera (born 1960), Spanish actor
- Quintín Bandera (c. 1834–1906), military leader
- Stepan Bandera (1909–1959), Ukrainian far-right militant and political leader
- Vaitiare Bandera (born 1964), American actress

== Other uses ==
- Bandera (moth), a genus of moth
- Bandera News Philippines, Philippine media company
- Inquirer Bandera, a tabloid newspaper based in the Philippines
- Bandera, a military unit of the Spanish Legion of the Spanish Army
- Bandera, the Spanish word for Flag
- USS Bandera, U.S. navy ship

== See also ==
- Bandera Roja (disambiguation)
- La Bandera (disambiguation)
- Banderas (disambiguation)
- Bandeira (disambiguation)
- Bandiera, an Italian surname
