= Texas Park Road 37 =

PR 37
- Medina Lake Park Road
- PR 37 highlighted in red

Route information
- Maintained by TxDOT
- Length: 14.191 mi (22.838 km)
- Existed: February 20, 1946–present

Major junctions
- West end: Bandera County Park in Lakehills
- East end: SH 16 near Helotes

Location
- Country: United States
- State: Texas
- Counties: Bandera, Medina

Highway system
- Highways in Texas; Interstate; US; State; Former; Toll; Loops; Spurs; FM/RM; Park; Rec
← PR 36	→ PR 38

Park Road 37 (PR 37) is a state highway located in the Texas Hill Country. The highway runs from Bandera County Park (formerly Avalon State Park) at the shores of Medina Lake in Lakehills to SH 16 northwest of Helotes. PR 37 has been noted as an excellent drive by motorcyclists for its views, tight bends and hills. It has also been called the "Nurburgring of Texas" by car and racing enthusiasts, in reference to the "Nordschleife" section of the Nürburgring.

== Route description ==
PR 37 begins in Bandera County Park on the edge of Medina Lake. The highway runs northwest out of the park, before a sharp turn to the southeast near Comanche Trail. After passing by a subdivision, PR 37 turns back to the northeast. The highway runs north–south through the town of Lakehills, serving as its main street. The highway turns sharp right at 3rd Street West, running in an east–west direction. Shortly after leaving the city, PR 37 intersects FM 1283 at a stop sign. After this intersection, PR 37 runs by many ranches and curves back down to the south. In Medina County, the highway turns back towards the east. PR 37 ends at an intersection with SH 16 a few miles northwest of Helotes.

Due to the low levels of the lake, the boat ramp in Plum Creek Cove (near the highway's western terminus) has been closed.

== History ==
The highway was designated in 1946 and generally follows an existing road. In 1958, the highway was extended about 0.2 miles to the shores of Medina Lake.

== Major intersections ==
County	Location	mi	km	Destinations	Notes
Bandera	Lakehills	0.0	0.0	Bandera County Park main entrance	Western terminus of Park Road 37
Bandera	Lakehills	1.0	1.6	FM 1283 – Pipe Creek	
Medina		14.2	22.9	SH 16 – Bandera, San Antonio	Eastern terminus of Park Road 37
1.000 mi = 1.609 km; 1.000 km = 0.621 mi
