= Tuff, Texas =

- Ghost town
- Location within Texas Location within the United States
- Coordinates: 29°46′09″N 99°24′13″W
- Country: United States
- State: Texas
- County: Bandera
- Elevation: 1,759 ft (536 m)
- Time zone: UTC-6 (Central (CST))
  - Summer (DST): UTC-5 (CDT)
- Area code: 830
- GNIS feature ID: 1380682

Tuff is a ghost town in Bandera County, in the U.S. state of Texas, in the Texas Hill Country, which is part of the Edwards Plateau. It is considered part of the San Antonio Metropolitan Statistical Area.

== History ==
Tuff also went by the name of Crockett. A post office, run by Ola Adams, was established at Tuff in 1901 and remained in operation until 1926. Mail would then be re-routed through Medina. By the twenty-first century, Tuff had turned into a ghost town.

During the 1990s, some of the former cabins were restored in an attempt to turn the town into a museum.

== Geography ==
Tuff is located 25 mi (40 km) west of Bandera in western Bandera County.

== Education ==
The community's first school was built in 1883. It joined the Medina Independent School District in 1930. The community continues to be served by the Medina ISD today.
