= Benjamin Franklin Highsmith =

Benjamin F. Highsmith
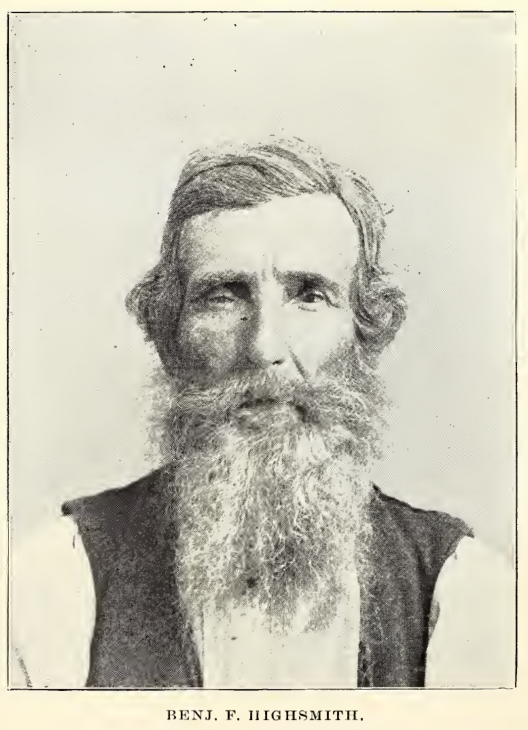
- Highsmith in old age, from A. J. Sowell's Early Settlers and Indian Fighters of Southwest Texas (1900)
- Born: September 11, 1817; St. Charles District, Missouri Territory, US
- Died: November 20, 1905 (aged 88); Uvalde County, Texas, US
- Spouse: Elizabeth Turner (m. 1853)
- Children: 13
- Military career
- Allegiance: Republic of Texas; United States
- Nickname: "Uncle Ben"
- Known for: Carrying dispatches out of the Alamo
- Battles: Texas Revolution; Battle of Velasco; Battle of Gonzales; Battle of Concepción; Grass Fight; Siege of Bexar; Battle of San Jacinto; Republic of Texas; Battle of Bandera Pass; Battle of Plum Creek; Somervell Expedition; Mexican–American War; Battle of Monterrey; Battle of Palo Alto; Battle of Buena Vista (WIA)

Benjamin Franklin Highsmith (September 11, 1817 – November 20, 1905) was an American frontiersman and soldier who fought in the Texas Revolution and the Mexican–American War and served as a Texas Ranger under John Coffee Hays. He is remembered chiefly as a courier who carried dispatches out of the Alamo shortly before its fall, and in his last years was widely described as the last man living who had seen and spoken with Travis, Bowie and Crockett inside the fortress.

== Early life ==
Highsmith was born on September 11, 1817, in the St. Charles District of Missouri Territory, a son of Ahijah M. Highsmith, who had served as a scout and ranger in the War of 1812. A. J. Sowell's 1900 account instead gives his birthplace as Lincoln County, Mississippi, an error repeated in his 1905 obituary.

The family came to Texas in 1823 as part of Stephen F. Austin's colony and settled on the Colorado River above the present town of La Grange. In 1830, aged thirteen, Highsmith made his first trip to San Antonio de Béxar with a party that included James Bowie and William B. Travis.

== Texas Revolution ==
At fifteen Highsmith joined a militia company under Aylett C. Buckner and was present at the Battle of Velasco on June 26, 1832, where his captain was killed. He settled at Bastrop the same year and made his home there for roughly the next fifty years.

He took part in the opening actions of the revolution: the Battle of Gonzales in October 1835, the Battle of Concepción, the Grass Fight, and the Siege of Béxar, entering the town that December with Ben Milam's volunteers.

=== Alamo courier ===
Highsmith remained with the garrison that occupied the Alamo after the fall of Béxar. By his own account, given in interviews and depositions late in life, Travis sent him from the Alamo on February 18, 1836, carrying an appeal for reinforcement to Col. James W. Fannin, Jr., at Goliad. Returning some days later he found the town already invested by the Mexican army; he paused on Powder House Hill, was sighted by Mexican cavalry, and outran the pursuit to reach Gonzales, where he reported the condition of the garrison to Sam Houston. Houston then sent him out again, with a youth named David B. Kent, carrying an order directing Fannin to abandon Goliad — an order Fannin delayed obeying, and whose consequence was the Goliad massacre.

Highsmith's account of the ride reached print through a letter to the Galveston News and through Sowell, who interviewed him in 1897 for the same paper; the two published versions are therefore not independent of one another.

He fought at the Battle of San Jacinto on April 21, 1836. The Handbook of Texas places him in the company of Capt. William Ware, while C. Richard King assigns him instead to Billingsley's regiment, the unit in which his father served.

== Republic of Texas service ==
In August 1840 Highsmith rode in the pursuit of the Comanche raiding party that had sacked Linnville, and fought at the Battle of Plum Creek near present Lockhart.

Soon after Plum Creek he joined the ranger company raised by John Coffee Hays and stationed at San Antonio, serving through the company's campaigns west and northwest of the town. Sowell also places him among Hays's rangers at the Battle of Bandera Pass, north of present Bandera. The date of that engagement is uncertain — accounts variously give 1841, 1842 and 1843 — and Stephen L. Moore has questioned Sowell's list of participants, noting that several of the men named do not appear on Hays's muster rolls until 1842.

Highsmith afterwards joined the Somervell Expedition against Mexico, but turned back with Hays when the expedition was abandoned, and so was not among those taken in the Mier Expedition who drew lots for their lives in the black bean episode.

== Mexican–American War ==
Highsmith marched into Mexico under Capt. Robert Addison Gillespie, fighting at Palo Alto and at Monterrey, where Gillespie was mortally wounded storming Independence Hill. At the Battle of Buena Vista in February 1847 he was himself wounded. He was later granted a Mexican War pension on account of two severe wounds received in the service.

== Later life ==
Highsmith married Elizabeth Turner, a daughter of Adam Turner; the couple had thirteen children. In 1882 the family moved from Bastrop to Bandera County. When Sowell interviewed him in 1897 he was living on Blanco Creek, between the Sabinal and Frio canyons, and was already nearly blind.

He died on November 20, 1905, near Utopia in Uvalde County, in his eighty-ninth year, blind and in poverty. News of his death travelled well beyond Texas: a Springfield Republican notice headed "Last Messenger From the Alamo" was reprinted in the Boston Evening Transcript.

== See also ==
- List of Texian survivors of the Battle of the Alamo

== Sources ==
- Groneman, Bill (October 30, 2019). "Highsmith, Benjamin Franklin (1817–1905)". Handbook of Texas (online ed.). Texas State Historical Association.
- King, C. Richard (2002). James Clinton Neill: The Shadow Commander of the Alamo. Austin, TX: Eakin Press.
- Moore, Stephen L. (2007). Savage Frontier: Rangers, Riflemen, and Indian Wars in Texas, Volume III, 1840–1841. Denton, TX: University of North Texas Press.
- Sowell, Andrew Jackson (1900). Early Settlers and Indian Fighters of Southwest Texas. Austin, TX: Ben C. Jones & Co. pp. 1–31.
- Traylor, Maude Wallis (1938). "Benjamin Franklin Highsmith". Frontier Times. Vol. 15, no. 7.
- "Last Messenger From the Alamo". Boston Evening Transcript. December 9, 1905. p. 21.
