= Highsmith =

Highsmith is a surname. Notable people with the surname include:

- Alex Highsmith (born 1997), American professional football player
- Alonzo Highsmith (born 1965), American professional football player
- Benjamin Franklin Highsmith (1817–1905), Texian and American soldier and Texas Ranger
- Carol M. Highsmith (born 1946) American photographer, author, and publisher
- Don Highsmith (born 1948), American professional football player
- Haywood Highsmith (born 1996), American professional basketball player
- Jim Highsmith (born 1945), author of multiple books in the field of software development methodology
- Malcijah Benjamin Highsmith (1804–1849), Texian, American and Confederate soldier
- Margaret Highsmith Dickson, Democratic member of the North Carolina General Assembly
- Patricia Highsmith (1921–1995), American novelist
- Samuel Highsmith (1804–1849), Texian and American soldier and Texas Ranger

== See also ==
- Highsmith (album), a 2017 album by Craig Taborn and Ikue Mori
