= Bander =

Bander is both a given name and a surname. Notable people with the name include:

- Neil H. Bander, American surgeon-scientist in urological oncology and tumor immunology
- Bander Faleh (born 1994), Saudi Arabian professional footballer

== See also ==
- Band (disambiguation)
- Bandar (disambiguation)
- Bandera (disambiguation)
- Banderas (disambiguation)
