= Bandera Downs =

Horse-racing track in Bandera, Texas

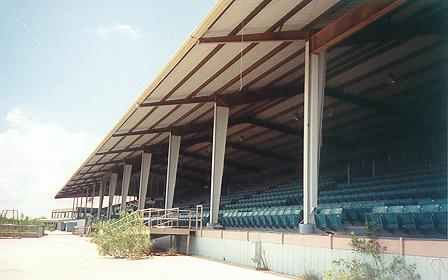
Bandera Downs in Bandera, Texas

Bandera Downs was an American horse-racing track located near Bandera, Bandera County, Texas.

A thousand people were on hand for the first race at the new track known as Lost Valley Downs in July 1965 running American Quarter Horse and Thoroughbred events until closing after the 1967 season. The track was sold in 1984 and reopened as Bandera Downs by the new owners. It opened as for its first season of parimutuel racing on July 6, 1990, shortly after the Texas Legislature legalized parimutuel betting. Despite a $6 million renovation and 284,690 people gambling $35.8 million the first year, the track faced declining attendance and wagering due to its proximity to nearby Retama Park, and closed in 1995.

The property was auctioned the following year, and renamed Bandera Downs Recreational Complex, hosting concerts, festivals, and other events. In February 1998, the track was again sold at a tax auction to the Bandera Independent School District for $1.475 million, but the purchase was nullified by District Judge V Murray Jordan the following year on the basis that the district could not bid at its own tax sale. The ruling was reversed after appeal, but the district could not develop the property without a bond issue. The track was sold again in 2004 for $1.2 million to a firm with plans to open a training center. The track remains intact, but is offered for sale.
