= Pipe Creek (Texas) =

- Location within Texas Location within the United States

Physical characteristics
- Source
  - coordinates: 29.7966095°N 98.8603074°W
- Mouth
  - coordinates: 29.6941136°N 98.9375308°W

Pipe Creek is a stream located primarily in Bandera County, Texas, in the United States.

Pipe Creek was so named in 1852, when a pioneer settler lost his tobacco pipe there. The stream is the namesake of the community Pipe Creek, located near the intersection of SH 16 and FM 1283.

== Course ==
The stream rises in southwestern Kendall County, traveling through rural areas. Shortly after entering into Bandera County, Pipe Creek briefly flows through the Kronsky State Natural Area. Bear Springs Creek flows into Pipe Creek just northeast of the unincorporated town Pipe Creek. The stream flows under SH 16 just east of the town and runs parallel to FM 1283, before flowing into Red Bluff Creek near Bandera Falls.

== See also ==
- Pipe Creek, Texas
- List of rivers of Texas
