= Tarpley, Texas =

- Unincorporated community
- Location within Texas Location within the United States
- Coordinates: 29°39′26″N 99°16′35″W
- Country: United States
- State: Texas
- County: Bandera
- Elevation: 1,322 ft (403 m)
- Time zone: UTC-6 (Central (CST))
  - Summer (DST): UTC-5 (CDT)
- Area code: 830
- GNIS feature ID: 1348252

Tarpley is an unincorporated community in Bandera County, Texas, United States. According to the Handbook of Texas, the community had a population of 30 in 2000. It is part of the San Antonio Metropolitan Statistical Area.

== History ==
A post office named Hondo Cañon opened in 1878 near Williams Creek. In 1899, it was moved further south and renamed Tarpley after the postmaster's son. In 1900, a store and blacksmith were attached to the post office and in 1902 a Baptist church opened. By 1925, the community had a population of 25, rising to 40 in 1984. In 1990 and 2000, Tarpley's population was 30.

In recent years, Tarpley has become known as the site of the famous Mac & Ernie's Roadside Eatery.

Although it is unincorporated, Tarpley has a post office, with the zip code 78883.

== Geography ==
Tarpley is located at the junction of Farm to Market Roads 462 and 470 on Williams Creek, approximately 12 miles southwest of Bandera in south-central Bandera County.

=== Climate ===
The climate in this area is characterized by hot, humid summers and generally mild to cool winters. According to the Köppen Climate Classification system, Tarpley has a humid subtropical climate, abbreviated "Cfa" on climate maps.

== Education ==
Tarpley's school opened in 1902. The Bandera Independent School District serves area students.
