= Lakehills, Texas =

- CDP
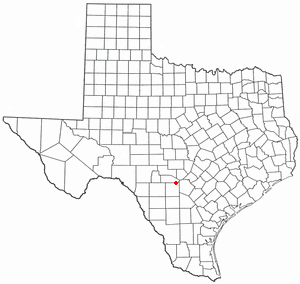
- Location of Lakehills, Texas

- Location in the United States
- Coordinates: 29°38′22″N 98°56′31″W
- Country: United States
- State: Texas
- County: Bandera

Area
  - Total: 34.4 sq mi (89.0 km^{2})
  - Land: 30.3 sq mi (78.5 km^{2})
  - Water: 4.1 sq mi (10.6 km^{2})
- Elevation: 1,322 ft (403 m)

Population (2020)
  - Total: 5,295
  - Density: 175/sq mi (67.5/km^{2})
- Time zone: UTC-6 (Central (CST))
  - Summer (DST): UTC-5 (CDT)
- ZIP code: 78063
- Area code: 830
- FIPS code: 48-40576
- GNIS feature ID: 2408557

Lakehills is a census-designated place (CDP) in Bandera County, Texas, United States. The population was 5,295 at the 2020 census, making it the most populous place in Bandera County. It is part of the San Antonio Metropolitan Statistical Area.

== History ==
Lakehills was originally known as Upper Medina Lake, until a post office substation was established in the area in the early 1960s. Two toll roads served the area until the late 1940s–early 1950s.

As the town is on Medina Lake, its prosperity is tied to that of the lake. During the 2010–13 Southern United States drought, lake levels dropped to below 5% capacity and Lakehills was described as a ghost town. Heavy rainfalls throughout 2015 and 2016 brought Medina Lake back up to 100% and remained at or near full capacity for the next few years; however, the last time the lake was recorded at full capacity was on July 7, 2019. Due to a series of severe droughts throughout the early 2020s, lake levels once again plummeted with the capacity dropping down to 2.3% in March 2025. As a result, Lakehills and the surrounding areas have experienced economic hardships due to a decrease in tourism along with a decrease in home values and a rise in homelessness.

== Geography ==
Lakehills is located 18 miles (29 km) southeast of Bandera and 30 miles (48 km) west of Boerne, Texas.

According to the United States Census Bureau, the CDP has a total area of 34.4 square miles (89 km^{2}), of which 30.3 square miles (78 km^{2}) is land and 4.1 square miles (11 km^{2}) (11.87%) is water.

== Demographics ==
Historical population
Census	Pop.	Note	%±
1990	2,147		—
2000	4,668		117.4%
2010	5,150		10.3%
2020	5,295		2.8%
U.S. Decennial Census; 1850–1900 1910; 1920 1930 1940; 1950 1960 1970; 1980 1990 2000; 2010 2020

Lakehills first appeared as a census designated place in the 1990 U.S. census.

=== 2020 census ===
Lakehills CDP, Texas – Racial and ethnic composition Note: the US Census treats Hispanic/Latino as an ethnic category. This table excludes Latinos from the racial categories and assigns them to a separate category. Hispanics/Latinos may be of any race.
Race / Ethnicity (NH = Non-Hispanic)	Pop 2000	Pop 2010	Pop 2020	% 2000	% 2010	% 2020
White alone (NH)	3,949	4,130	3,941	84.60%	80.19%	74.43%
Black or African American alone (NH)	18	27	38	0.39%	0.52%	0.72%
Native American or Alaska Native alone (NH)	24	16	36	0.51%	0.31%	0.68%
Asian alone (NH)	12	12	33	0.26%	0.23%	0.62%
Native Hawaiian or Pacific Islander alone (NH)	2	0	4	0.04%	0.00%	0.08%
Other race alone (NH)	9	5	14	0.19%	0.10%	0.26%
Mixed race or Multiracial (NH)	52	52	193	1.11%	1.01%	3.64%
Hispanic or Latino (any race)	602	908	1,036	12.90%	17.63%	19.57%
Total	4,668	5,150	5,295	100.00%	100.00%	100.00%

As of the 2020 United States census, there were 5,295 people, 2,179 households, and 1,275 families residing in the CDP.

=== 2010 census ===
As of the 2010 census, there were 5,150 people and 1,961 households. There were 3,143 housing units. The racial makeup of the CDP was 93.6% White, 0.7% African American, 0.5% Native American, 0.3% Asian, less than 0.1% Pacific Islander, and 1.7% from two or more races. Hispanic or Latino were 17.6% of the population.

The median household income was $54,754. About 14% of the population were below the poverty line.

=== 2000 census ===
At the 2000 census there were 4,668 people, 1,874 households, and 1,330 families in the CDP. The population density was 154.1 inhabitants per square mile (59.5/km^{2}). There were 2,807 housing units at an average density of 92.7 per square mile (35.8/km^{2}). The racial makeup of the CDP was 93.04% White, 0.43% African American, 0.75% Native American, 0.28% Asian, 0.06% Pacific Islander, 3.58% from other races, and 1.86% from two or more races. Hispanic or Latino of any race were 12.90%.

Of the 1,874 households 29.3% had children under the age of 18 living with them, 59.9% were married couples living together, 6.6% had a female householder with no husband present, and 29.0% were non-families. 22.8% of households were one person and 8.6% were one person aged 65 or older. The average household size was 2.49 and the average family size was 2.92.

The age distribution was 24.6% under the age of 18, 5.4% from 18 to 24, 28.2% from 25 to 44, 27.9% from 45 to 64, and 13.9% 65 or older. The median age was 41 years. For every 100 females, there were 100.5 males. For every 100 females age 18 and over, there were 101.5 males.

The median household income was $42,964 and the median family income was $49,464. Males had a median income of $32,444 versus $26,158 for females. The per capita income for the CDP was $21,100. About 7.8% of families and 10.5% of the population were below the poverty line, including 16.9% of those under age 18 and 3.6% of those age 65 or over.

== Education ==
Lakehills is served by the Bandera Independent School District. The school district's second elementary school, Hill Country Elementary School, is located in Lakehills on FM 1283. Area students are also served by Bandera Middle School and Bandera High School, both located in Bandera.
