= Medina High School (Texas) =

Location
- One Bobcat Lane; Medina, Bandera County, Texas 78055-1470; United States; 29.800094°N 99.248629°W

Information
- School type: Public, high school
- Locale: Rural: Remote
- School district: Medina ISD
- NCES School ID: 483003003372
- Principal: John R. McNamara III
- Teaching staff: 29.41 (on an FTE basis)
- Grades: PK–12
- Enrollment: 239 (2023–2024)
- Student to teacher ratio: 8.13
- Colors: Blue & Gold
- Athletics conference: UIL Class A
- Mascot: Bobcats/Lady Bobcats
- Website: www.medinaisd.org/80978

Medina High School or Medina Secondary School is a public high school located in Medina, Texas (USA), classified as a 1A school by the UIL. It is part of the Medina Independent School District serving students in central Bandera County. During 2022–2023, Medina High School had an enrollment of 246 students and a student to teacher ratio of 6.92. The school received an overall rating of "B" from the Texas Education Agency for the 2024–2025 school year.

== History ==
In 2012, Medina High School was ranked 9th in Children at Risk's Top 10 High Schools in Greater San Antonio. In 2013, the school was rated "Met Standard" by the Texas Education Agency.

== Athletics ==
The Medina Bobcats compete in the following sports

- Baseball
- Basketball
- Cross Country
- Golf
- Football
- Softball
- Tennis
- Track and Field
- Volleyball

=== State Titles ===
- Boys Cross Country
  - 1997(1A)
