= Medina, Bandera County, Texas =

Medina, Texas
- Unincorporated community
- Nickname: Apple Capital of Texas
- Location within the state of Texas Medina (the United States)
- Coordinates: 29°47′52″N 99°15′02″W
- Country: United States
- State: Texas
- County: Bandera
- Elevation: 1,447 ft (441 m)

Population (2000)
  - Total: 515
- Time zone: UTC-6 (Central (CST))
  - Summer (DST): UTC-5 (CDT)
- Postal code: 78055
- FIPS code: 48-47400
- GNIS feature ID: 1362568

Medina is an unincorporated community in Bandera County, Texas, United States. It is part of the San Antonio Metropolitan Statistical Area. Medina is famous for its apples. The community's population was estimated to be 515 in 2000.

== History ==
Although it is unincorporated, Medina has a post office, with the ZIP code of 78055.

== Geography ==
Medina is located at the intersection of Texas State Highway 16 and Farm to Market Road 337, 12 mi (19 km) northwest of Bandera and 21 mi (34 km) south of Kerrville in central Bandera County.

The town is also located at the source of the namesake Medina River, where it splits into the North and West Prongs.

=== Climate ===
The climate in this area is characterized by hot, humid summers and generally mild to cool winters. According to the Köppen Climate Classification system, Medina has a humid subtropical climate, abbreviated "Cfa" on climate maps.

Climate data for Medina, Texas, 1991–2020 normals, extremes 1966–present
Month	Jan	Feb	Mar	Apr	May	Jun	Jul	Aug	Sep	Oct	Nov	Dec	Year
Record high °F (°C)	88 (31)	98 (37)	100 (38)	101 (38)	103 (39)	109 (43)	108 (42)	109 (43)	104 (40)	99 (37)	93 (34)	88 (31)	109 (43)
Mean maximum °F (°C)	79.9 (26.6)	84.6 (29.2)	88.6 (31.4)	92.1 (33.4)	95.0 (35.0)	98.7 (37.1)	100.2 (37.9)	101.8 (38.8)	98.3 (36.8)	92.3 (33.5)	83.5 (28.6)	79.7 (26.5)	102.1 (38.9)
Mean daily maximum °F (°C)	62.9 (17.2)	66.6 (19.2)	73.5 (23.1)	79.6 (26.4)	85.7 (29.8)	91.9 (33.3)	94.2 (34.6)	95.5 (35.3)	89.4 (31.9)	81.2 (27.3)	70.5 (21.4)	63.1 (17.3)	79.5 (26.4)
Daily mean °F (°C)	49.1 (9.5)	52.8 (11.6)	59.8 (15.4)	66.1 (18.9)	74.0 (23.3)	80.3 (26.8)	82.2 (27.9)	82.4 (28.0)	76.9 (24.9)	68.0 (20.0)	57.6 (14.2)	49.9 (9.9)	66.6 (19.2)
Mean daily minimum °F (°C)	35.2 (1.8)	39.0 (3.9)	46.1 (7.8)	52.6 (11.4)	62.2 (16.8)	68.6 (20.3)	70.3 (21.3)	69.3 (20.7)	64.5 (18.1)	54.7 (12.6)	44.7 (7.1)	36.8 (2.7)	53.7 (12.0)
Mean minimum °F (°C)	21.1 (−6.1)	23.7 (−4.6)	28.3 (−2.1)	35.5 (1.9)	46.0 (7.8)	59.4 (15.2)	63.8 (17.7)	62.4 (16.9)	51.3 (10.7)	35.9 (2.2)	28.2 (−2.1)	21.8 (−5.7)	19.1 (−7.2)
Record low °F (°C)	9 (−13)	6 (−14)	15 (−9)	22 (−6)	35 (2)	47 (8)	54 (12)	52 (11)	39 (4)	23 (−5)	15 (−9)	5 (−15)	5 (−15)
Average precipitation inches (mm)	2.23 (57)	1.84 (47)	3.00 (76)	2.54 (65)	5.53 (140)	3.89 (99)	2.51 (64)	2.26 (57)	4.48 (114)	3.29 (84)	2.34 (59)	2.36 (60)	36.27 (922)
Average snowfall inches (cm)	0.1 (0.25)	0.0 (0.0)	0.0 (0.0)	0.0 (0.0)	0.0 (0.0)	0.0 (0.0)	0.0 (0.0)	0.0 (0.0)	0.0 (0.0)	0.0 (0.0)	0.1 (0.25)	0.0 (0.0)	0.2 (0.5)
Average precipitation days (≥ 0.01 in)	10.3	9.6	11.1	9.4	12.8	8.9	6.8	6.0	9.3	9.3	10.4	11.0	114.9
Average snowy days (≥ 0.1 in)	0.1	0.0	0.0	0.0	0.0	0.0	0.0	0.0	0.0	0.0	0.0	0.1	0.2
Source 1: NOAA
Source 2: National Weather Service

== Education ==
Medina is served by the Medina Independent School District and home to the Medina High School Bobcats. This is one of the school districts in Bandera County, in addition to Bandera Independent School District and a small portion of Northside Independent School District.

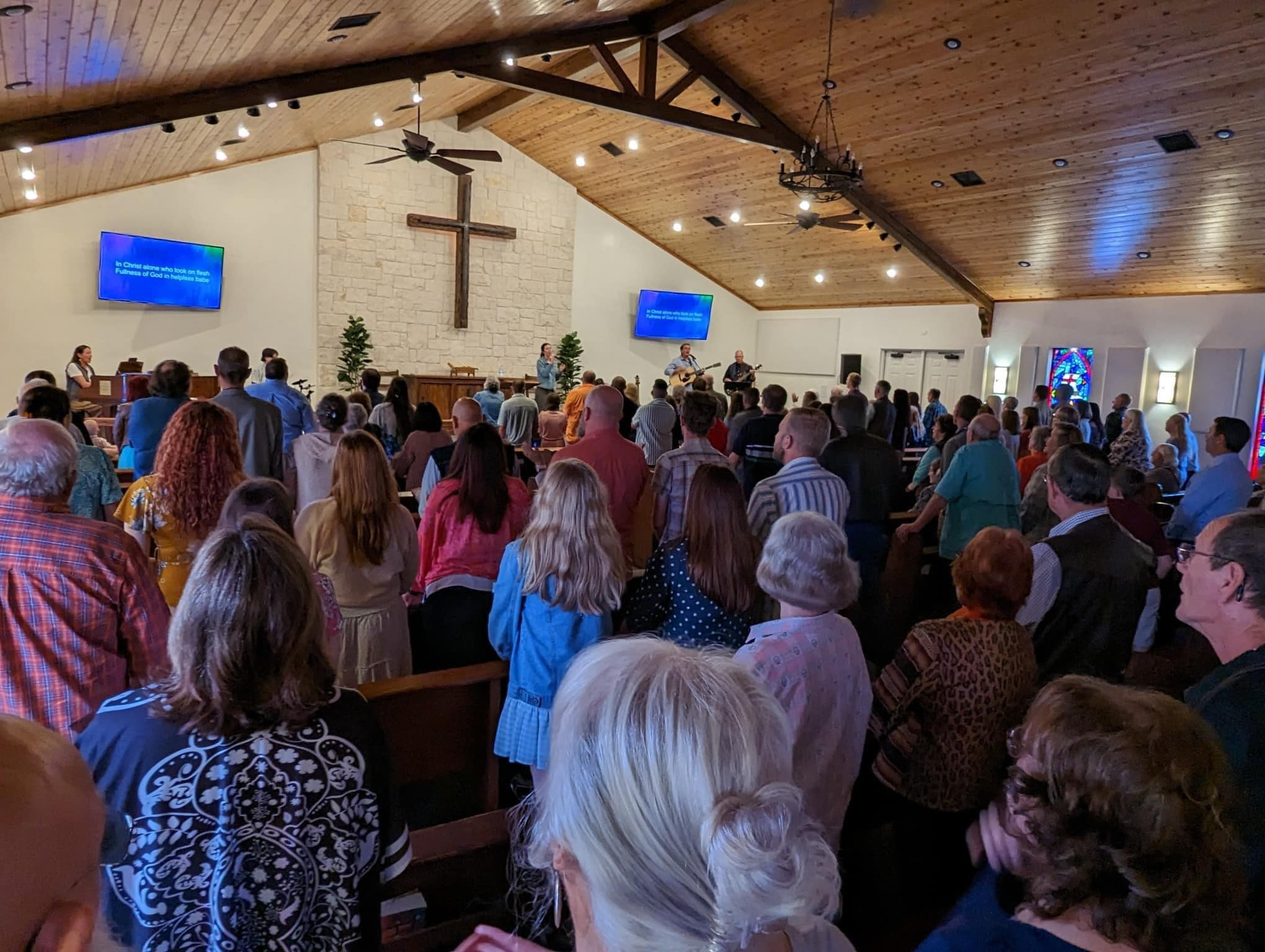
Medina Community Church

== Churches ==
Medina Community Church
First Baptist Medina
Stringtown Church of Christ
