= Doe Creek =

Stream in Bandera County, Texas, U.S.

Coordinates: 29°43′56″N 99°03′14″W

Doe Creek is a stream in Bandera County, Texas, in the United States. Doe Creek was named in the 1850s when a pioneer shot a doe on its banks.

== See also ==
- List of rivers of Texas
