= Pipe Creek =

Pipe Creek may refer to the following places in the United States:

A watercourse:

- Pipe Creek (S. Fork San Jacinto River), a stream in Riverside County, California
- Pipe Creek (Wabash River), a stream in Indiana
- Pipe Creek (White River), a stream in Indiana
- Pipe Creek (Texas), a stream in Bandera County, Texas

or one of 23 other streams in the United States

A place:

- Pipe Creek, Texas, an unincorporated community in Bandera County
- Pipe Creek Township, Madison County, Indiana, a township
- Pipe Creek Township, Miami County, Indiana, a township
- Pipe Creek Sinkhole, a paleontological site in Grant County, Indiana

== See also ==
- Double Pipe Creek, a tributary of the Monocacy River in Maryland
