= Pipe Creek Township, Indiana =

Pipe Creek Township, Indiana may refer to one of the following places:

- Pipe Creek Township, Madison County, Indiana
- Pipe Creek Township, Miami County, Indiana

== See also ==
- Pipe Creek (disambiguation)
