= Linvill =

Linvill is a surname. Notable people with the surname include:

- John G. Linvill (1919–2011), American professor emeritus of electrical engineering
- William Linvill (1919–1980), American electrical engineer

== See also ==
- Linville (disambiguation)
