= Nicola Fabrizi =

Italian politician (1804–1885)

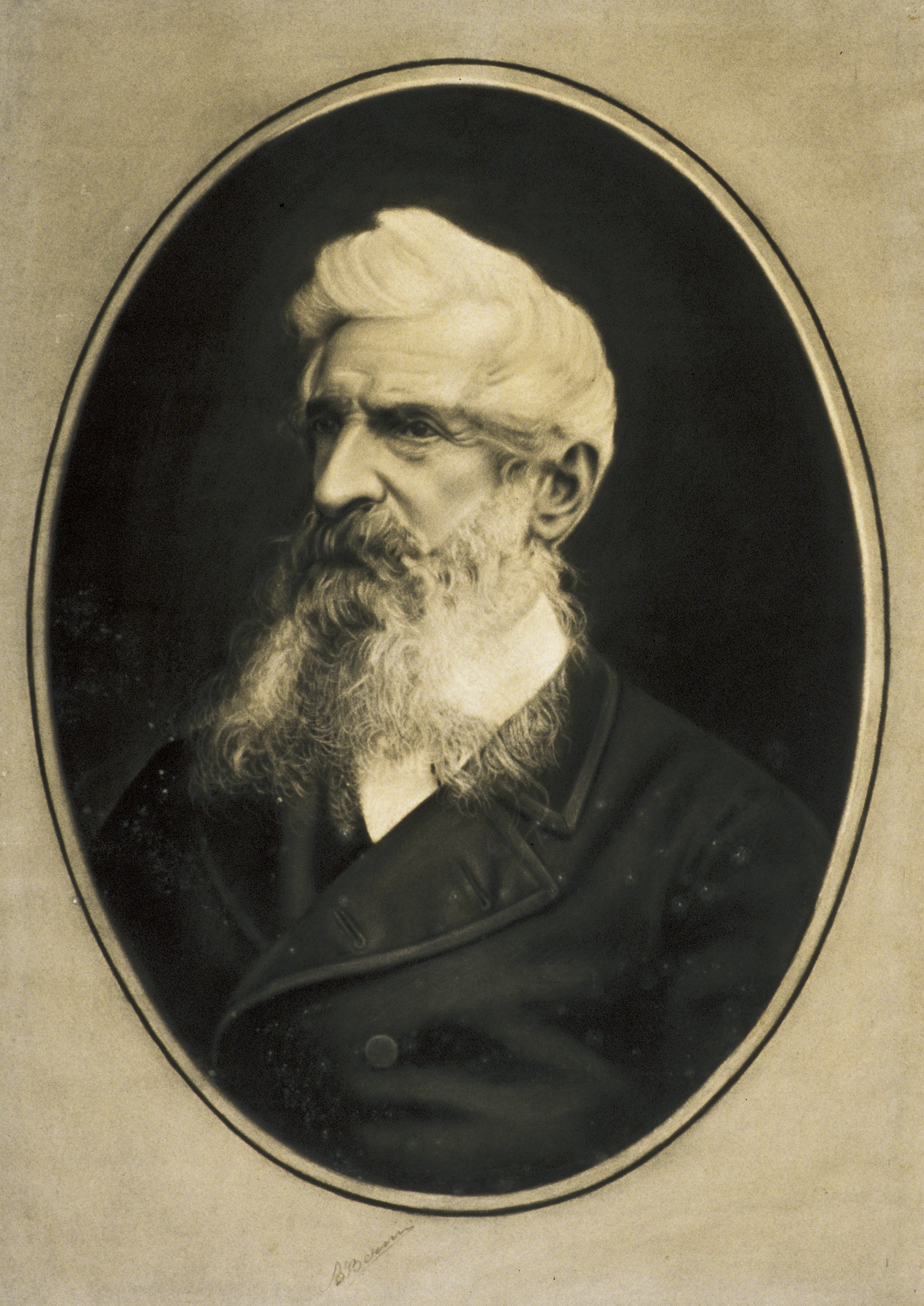
Portrait of Nicola Fabrizi

Nicola Fabrizi (4 April 1804 – 31 March 1885) was an Italian politician. He was one of the most militant and dedicated leaders of the Risorgimento, the movement aimed at the unification of Italy.

== Early life ==
Nicola Fabrizi was born on 4 April 1804 in Modena.

== Insurrections ==
He took part in the Modena insurrection of 1831, and attempted to succour Ancona, but was arrested. After his release he went to Marseille where he joined the Young Italy movement. Afterwards he organized, with Giuseppe Mazzini, the ill-fated Savoy expedition. Taking refuge in Spain, he fought against the Carlists, and was decorated for valour on the battlefield (18 July 1837).

== Conspiracies ==
In 1837 he established a centre of conspiracy at Malta, endeavoured to dissuade Mazzini from the Bandiera enterprise, but aided Crispi in organizing the Sicilian revolution of 1848. With a company of volunteers he distinguished himself 1849 in the defence of Venice, afterwards proceeding to Rome, where he took part in the defence of San Pancrazio. Upon the fall of Rome he returned to Malta, accumulating arms and stores, which he conveyed to Sicily, after having worked with Crispi to prepare the Sicilian revolution of 1860.

== Governorship ==
While Giuseppe Garibaldi was sailing from Genoa towards Marsala, Fabrizi landed at Pozzillo, and, after severe fighting, joined Garibaldi at Palermo. Under the Garibaldian Dictatorship he was appointed governor of Messina and minister of war. Returning to Malta after the Neapolitan plebiscite, which he had vainly endeavoured to postpone, he was recalled to aid Cialdini in suppressing brigandage.

== Diplomacy ==
While on his way to Sicily in 1862, to induce Garibaldi to give up the Aspromonte enterprise, he was arrested at Naples by La Marmora. During the war of 1866 he became Garibaldis deputy chief of staff, and in 1867 he fought at Mentana. As a member of parliament from 1861 to 1865 he endeavoured to promote agreement between the leaders of the Left. From 1878 onwards worked to secure the return of Crispi to power. He died in March 1885, two years before the realization of this objective.
