= Henry Albert Highsmith =

- Born: January 11, 1843; Bastrop, Republic of Texas
- Died: March 19, 1930 (aged 87); Hutto, Texas, US
- Military career
- Allegiance: Confederate States
- Branch: Confederate States Army
- Rank: Captain
- Wars: Texas–Indian wars; American Civil War

Henry Albert Highsmith (1843–1930) was a Texian Texas Ranger and Confederate officer. He was a son of Samuel Highsmith and a brother of Malcijah Benjamin Highsmith.

== Sources ==
- Cutrer, Thomas W. (October 30, 2019). "Highsmith, Henry Albert (1843–1930)". Handbook of Texas (online ed.). Texas State Historical Association.
