= Linnville =

Linnville may refer to:

- Linnville, Kansas, a ghost town
- Linnville, Missouri, now Linneus, Missouri, a small city
- Linnville, Ohio, an unincorporated community
- Linnville, Brazoria County, Texas, a ghost town
- Linnville, Calhoun County, Texas, a ghost town

== See also ==
- Linville (disambiguation)
