= Bandera cupidinella =

Scientific classification
- Kingdom: Animalia
- Phylum: Arthropoda
- Clade: Pancrustacea
- Class: Insecta
- Order: Lepidoptera
- Family: Pyralidae
- Genus: Bandera
- Species: B. cupidinella

Binomial name
- Bandera cupidinella (Hulst, 1888)

Synonyms
- Nasutes cupidinella Hulst, 1888; Nasutes venata Hampson, 1930; Anerastia conspersella Ragonot, 1901

Species of moth

Bandera cupidinella is a species of snout moth in the genus Bandera. It was described by George Duryea Hulst in 1888, and is known from the United States, including Colorado and New Mexico.
