= USS Bandera =

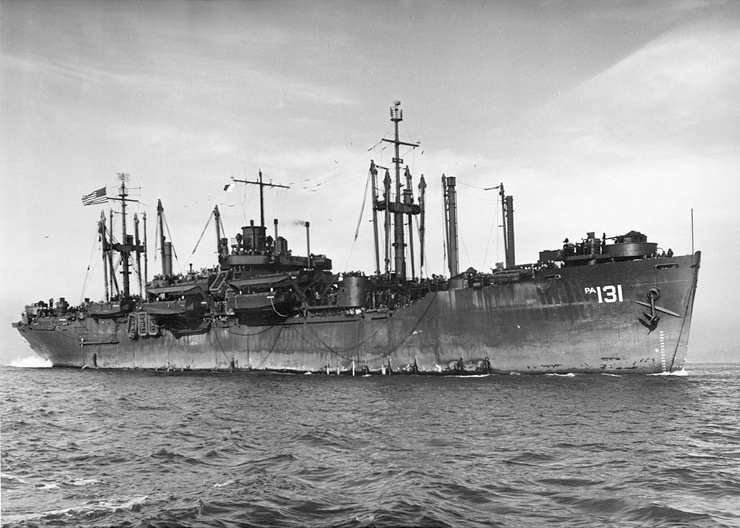

History

United States
- Name: USS Bandera
- Namesake: Bandera County, Texas
- Builder: California Shipbuilding
- Laid down: 23 July 1944
- Launched: 6 October 1944
- Commissioned: 6 December 1944
- Decommissioned: 7 May 1946
- Stricken: 21 May 1946
- Fate: Sold for scrap, 23 January 1974

General characteristics
- Class & type: Haskell-class attack transport
- Displacement: 6,873 tons (lt), 14,837 t (fl)
- Length: 455 ft (139 m)
- Beam: 62 ft (19 m)
- Draft: 24 ft (7 m)
- Propulsion: 1 × geared turbine, 2 × header-type boilers, 1 × propeller, designed 8,500 shp (6,338 kW)
- Speed: 17 knots (31 km/h; 20 mph)
- Boats & landing craft carried: 2 × LCM; 12 × LCVP; 3 × LCPL
- Capacity: Troops: 86 officers, 1,475 enlisted; Cargo: 150,000 cu ft, 2,900 tons
- Complement: 56 officers, 480 enlisted
- Armament: 1 × 5"/38 dual-purpose gun; 4 × twin 40mm guns; 10 × single 20mm guns; late armament, add 1 × 40mm quad mount

USS Bandera (APA-131) was a Haskell-class attack transport in service with the United States Navy from 1944 to 1946. She was scrapped in 1974.

== History ==
Bandera was of the VC2-S-AP5 Victory ship design type and was named for Bandera County, Texas. She was laid down under a United States Maritime Commission contract (MCV hull 47) on 23 July 1944 at Wilmington, Los Angeles, by the California Shipbuilding Corporation; launched on 6 October 1944; sponsored by Mrs. Elmer P. Abernethy; acquired by the Navy on 5 December 1944; and commissioned on 6 December 1944.

Following shakedown off San Pedro and amphibious training at San Diego, the attack transport underwent post shakedown availability at Terminal Island, California On 28 January 1945, Bandera sailed for San Francisco to load cargo and embark passengers for passage to Hawaii. She stood out to sea on 1 February and reached Honolulu exactly a week later. After shifting to Pearl Harbor the next day, the 9th, she began a busy schedule of shuttling troops and cargo between Pearl Harbor and the Marshall, Caroline, and Mariana Islands. She carried reinforcement troops and supplies on her outbound journeys and returned wounded men during her voyages back to Pearl Harbor.

Although Bandera participated in tactical and amphibious training off Maui from 3 April to 31 May, she never participated in any landing operations. She left the Southwest Pacific on 19 June carrying Army troops whom she disembarked at San Francisco before continuing on to Everett, Washington, for upkeep. At the end of June, she embarked troops and cargo and began another voyage to Pearl Harbor where she resumed ferry service between the islands. Bandera was at Ulithi in the Caroline Islands when she received news of the Japanese capitulation. She steamed to Jinsen, Korea, in October before being assigned to the "Magic Carpet" fleet that returned veterans to the United States for discharge. She made one trip to Shanghai, China, in January and February 1946.

Bandera arrived in San Francisco on 15 February 1946, disembarked her contingent of returning troops, and then sailed for Norfolk, Virginia, where she arrived on 11 March for inactivation preparations.

=== Fate ===
Bandera was decommissioned on 7 May 1946, returned to the Maritime Commission, and placed in the National Defense Reserve Fleet at James River on the 14th. Her name was struck from the Navy list on 21 May. In 1955 Bandera was withdrawn from the Reserve Fleet as part of a Repair Program, GAA-A.H. Bull, and then returned. On 23 January 1974 she was sold to Consolidated Steel Corporation, for $191,799.80, to be scrapped. At 0900 EDT, on 1 April 1974 she was withdrawn from the Reserve Fleet and sent to the breaker's yard.
