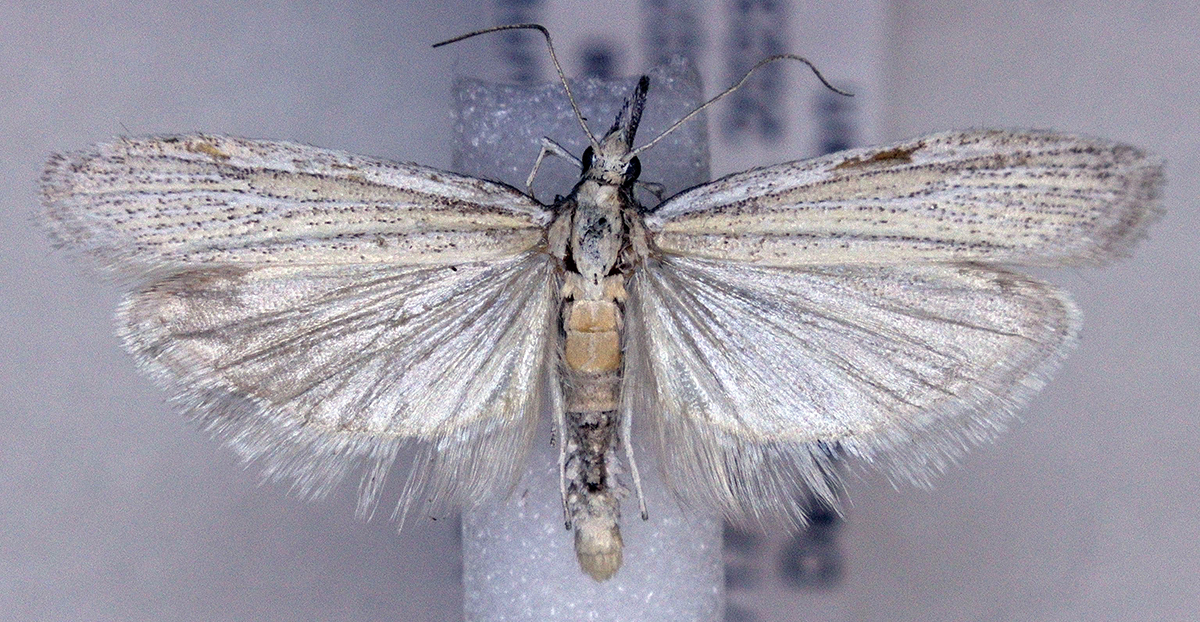

Scientific classification
- Domain: Eukaryota
- Kingdom: Animalia
- Phylum: Arthropoda
- Class: Insecta
- Order: Lepidoptera
- Family: Pyralidae
- Genus: Bandera
- Species: B. virginella

Binomial name
- Bandera virginella Dyar, 1908

= Bandera virginella =

Species of moth

Bandera virginella is a species of snout moth. It was described by Harrison Gray Dyar Jr. in 1908, and is found in the US from southern Alberta and Washington, south through Colorado to California and New Mexico.
