= Bandera Falls, Texas =

- Unincorporated community
- Location within Texas Location within the United States
- Coordinates: 29°40′38″N 98°57′48″W
- Country: United States
- State: Texas
- County: Bandera
- Elevation: 1,175 ft (358 m)
- Time zone: UTC-6 (Central (CST))
  - Summer (DST): UTC-5 (CDT)
- Area code: 830
- GNIS feature ID: 1330002

Bandera Falls is an unincorporated community in Bandera County, Texas, United States. It is part of the San Antonio Metropolitan Statistical Area.

== History ==
Bandera Falls started as a residential community in 1966 and had 10 houses. By 1990, it was listed as a community, but without census figures. The population was estimated to be 90 in 2009.

== Geography ==
Bandera Creek is a residential subdivision, located several miles (one dozen km) south of Bandera and approximately 5 miles (8.0 km) southwest of Pipe Creek on Farm to Market Road 1283 in eastern Bandera County. It lies along the left bank of the Medina River, just north of its outlet into Medina Lake, one of the largest bodies of water in South Texas.

== Education ==
The Bandera Independent School District serves area students. The closest school is Hill Country Elementary, about 2 miles (3 km) to the north in Pipe Creek.

== Notable person ==
- Joseph Gutheinz, retired NASA worker who has investigated stolen and missing Moon rocks.
