= Bandera Creek =

Stream in Bandera County, Texas, U.S.

Coordinates: 29°43′34.9″N 99°02′48.2″W

- Map

Location
- Country: United States
- State: Texas
- County: Bandera County

Physical characteristics
- Mouth: Medina River

Bandera Creek is a stream in Bandera County, Texas, in the United States. It rises in Bandera Pass, 2 1/2 miles south of Camp Verde in northeastern Bandera County (at 29°51' N, 99°06' W), and flows south for thirteen miles to its mouth on the Medina River, a mile east of Bandera (at 29°44' N, 99°03' W).

Bandera Creek took its name from Bandera Pass.

== See also ==
- List of rivers of Texas
