= Bandera binotella =

Scientific classification
- Domain: Eukaryota
- Kingdom: Animalia
- Phylum: Arthropoda
- Class: Insecta
- Order: Lepidoptera
- Family: Pyralidae
- Genus: Bandera
- Species: B. binotella

Binomial name
- Bandera binotella (Zeller, 1872)

Synonyms
- Anerastia binotella Zeller, 1872; Bandera subluteella Ragonot, 1887

Species of moth

Bandera binotella is a species of snout moth in the genus Bandera. It was described by Philipp Christoph Zeller in 1872. It is found in North America, including Texas, New Mexico, California, Colorado and Alberta.
