= Bandera Roja =

Bandera Roja or Red Flag may refer to:

- Bandera Roja (Tupiza), a defunct Bolivian newspaper founded in 1947
- Peruvian Communist Party - Red Flag (Bandera Roja), a political group in Peru
- Red Flag Party (Bandera Roja), a political group in Venezuela
- Bandera Roja (Spain), a political group in Spain
- Bandera Roja (periodical), a political activism periodical in Puerto Rico
