= Bandera High School =

Public school in Texas, United States

Location
- 474 Old San Antonio Highway; Bandera, Bandera County, Texas 78003-0727; United States; 29.7331°N 99.0614°W

Information
- School type: Public, high school
- Established: c. 1935
- Locale: Rural: Distant
- School district: Bandera ISD
- Superintendent: Gary L. Bitzkie
- NCES School ID: 480936000395
- Principal: Robert LaLanne
- Staff: 60.9 (on an FTE basis)
- Grades: 9–12
- Enrollment: 664 (2026–2027)
- Student to teacher ratio: 15.1
- Campus: Rural
- Colors: Royal blue, white
- Slogan: We Are One
- Athletics conference: District 14-4A D2(UIL)
- Mascot: Bulldog
- Rivals: Hondo Owls, Boerne Greyhounds
- Website: bhs.banderaisd.net

Bandera High School is a public high school located in Bandera, Texas, United States, and classified as a 4A school by the UIL. It is part of the Bandera Independent School District that serves students in eastern Bandera County.

For the 2026-2027 year, Bandera High School has enrolled 664 students with a student to teacher ratio of 15.1. The school received an overall rating of "C" from the Texas Education Agency for the 2025-2026 school year.

== History ==
It was named a 2001-02 National Blue Ribbon School In 2014, Bandera High School was ranked 16th of 66 high schools in Children at Risk's High Schools in Greater San Antonio.

Bandera coach Christopher Mata was arrested on May 23, 2025 and charged with aggravated sexual assault, improper relations between student and educator, and invasive video recording.

== Athletics ==
The Bandera Bulldogs compete in these sports

- Baseball
- Basketball
- Cross country running
- American football
- Golf
- Powerlifting
- Association football
- Softball
- Soccer
- Tennis
- Track and field
- Volleyball
- Skeet Shooting

=== Achievements ===
- Girls cross country -

State Champions

  - 2014(4A)
  - 2015(4A)
  - 2016(4A)
  - 2017(4A)
- Football

State Champions

  - 2002(3A/D2)
