= Linville =

Linville may refer to:

== Places ==
- Linville, Queensland, a town in the Somerset Region, Australia
- Linville, North Carolina, United States
- Linville Falls, North Carolina, United States

== Outdoor attractions in the United States ==
- Linville Caverns, North Carolina
- Linville Falls, North Carolina
- Linville Gorge Wilderness, North Carolina
- Lake Linville, Kentucky
- Linville River, North Carolina

== People ==
- Joanne Linville, (1928–2021), American film and television actress
- Kelli Linville, (born 1948), American politician
- Larry Linville, (1939–2000), American actor
- Matthew Linville, American actor; see List of 7th Heaven characters

== See also ==
- Linnville (disambiguation)
