= La Bandera =

La Bandera may refer to:

- La Bandera (film), a 1935 French drama film
- La Bandera (novel), a 1931 novel by Pierre Mac Orlan
- La Bandera station, in Caracas, Venezuela
- La Bandera (comics), a Marvel Comics superheroine
- La Bandera/Tultitlán (Mexibús), a BRT station in Tultitlán, Mexico
