= Linnville, Brazoria County, Texas =

Ghost town in Texas, US

- Ghost town
- Location in Texas
- Coordinates: 28.98914170°N 95.76134120°W
- Country: United States
- State: Texas
- County: Brazoria

Linnville is a ghost town in Brazoria County, Texas, United States. It was founded during Reconstruction after the American Civil War by African Americans. It had a school, church, and a cemetery, called the Boone Cemetery.
