= Bandiera =

Bandiera is an Italian surname, meaning flag. Notable people with the name include:

- Bandiera brothers (died 1844), Italian nationalists during the Risorgimento
- Benedetto Bandiera (c. 1560–1634), Italian painter of the early-Baroque period
- Bobby Bandiera (born 1953), American rock guitarist, singer and songwriter
- Dario Bandiera (born 1970), Italian actor and comedian
- Dean Bandiera (1926–2020), Canadian football player
- Irma Bandiera (1915–1944) Italian resistance member
- Marco Bandiera (born 1984), Italian road bicycle racer
- Neri Bandiera (born 1989), Argentine football forward
- Oriana Bandiera (born 1971), Italian economist and academic

== See also ==
- Bandera (disambiguation)
