= Battle of Bandera Pass =

1841 battle of the American Indian Wars

- Part of the Indian Wars
Date	1841 or 1843
Location	Near Bandera, Texas
Result	Texan victory

Belligerents
Republic of Texas	Comanche

Commanders and leaders
John Coffee Hays	Unknown Comanche Chief reported killed by the Rangers

Strength
50 rangers and militia	Unknown, but the best guesses are 200 in the band, including women

Casualties and losses
5 killed	Unknown

The Battle of Bandera Pass in 1841 marked the turning point of the Texas-Indian wars. Though they would continue another 34 years, the tide began to turn at Bandera Pass.

Some sources show 1843 as the year of this event.

== Background ==
=== Location ===
Bandera Pass is a plain gap in the chain of mountains about ten miles northwest of the town of Bandera, Texas.

=== Military background from 1821–1841 ===
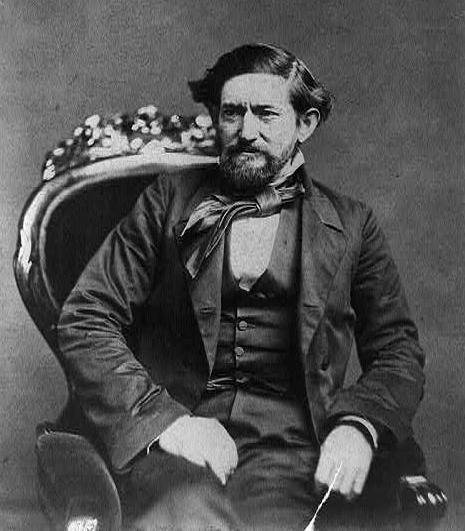
John Coffee Hays

At the time of the Texas Revolution there were 30,000 Anglo and Hispanic settlers in Texas and approximately 15,000 Plains Indians. The settlers were armed with single-shot weapons, which the Comanche, in particular, had learned very well to counter.

Certainly the Spanish, then the Mexicans, and later the Texans had learned that single-shot weapons were not enough to defeat the deadly Comanche light horse, whose mastery of cavalry tactics and mounted bowmanship were renowned. The Comanches' constant movement caused many of their opponents' older single-shot weapons to miss their target in the chaos of battle. The Comanche could then easily kill their enemies before they had a chance to reload. Though it was understated, the Comanche learned to use single-shot firearms quite well, but they found bows superior in terms of fire rate. The Comanche put an end to Spanish expansion in North America. Besides the Mapuche and Chichimeca, the Comanche did what no other indigenous peoples had managed: defending their homeland—even expanding it—in the face of the best military forces the Spanish could bring against them. In the late 18th century the Comanche were said to have stolen every horse in New Mexico.

Up until the introduction of repeating rifles and revolvers, weapons and tactics were definitely on the side of the Plains Indians, most especially the Comanche. However, disease and numbers were on the side of the Texans, and that increased with time.

The tide clearly began to turn after 1840, when John Coffee Hays joined the Texas Rangers. Known for improving discipline and morale, he also armed his men with Paterson Colt five-shot revolvers instead of single-shot guns. For the first time, at the Battle of Bandera Pass in 1841, the Indians came up against the "new rangers" and were repelled. This battle marked a clear turning point in the war against the Plains tribes, though they would fight on bitterly for another 34 years.

== The setting for the battle ==
After the Great Raid of 1840 where the Comanches under Buffalo Hump sacked Victoria, Texas, and Linnville, President Sam Houston felt he had to strengthen the frontier defenses to prevent future "Great Raids." He then appointed Capt. John Coffee Hays to recruit a company of rangers to specifically contain the Comanches. That company was filled with noted Indian fighters, among them Bigfoot Wallace, Ben Highsmith, Creed Taylor, Sam Walker, Robert Addison Gillespie, P.H. Bell, Kit Ackland, Sam Luckey, James Dunn, Tom Galberth, George Neill and Frank Chevallier, and others well known in Texas frontier history. This was the company that confronted the Comanche in Bandera Pass in 1841.

It was generally accepted on both sides that the Comanches were superior cavalrymen at the time. The choice of weapons available to them to use while mounted, namely their short bows and wooden lances, were best employed upon the Great Plains. The preferred terrain was the rolling, wide-open hills of the prairie. Comanches did utilize ambushes, but invariably the ambush involved attacking from horseback from behind a thicket of trees or somewhere that allowed men and horses to remain concealed. However, these particular conditions were clearly impossible all the time—Texan vistas are often quite long and flat and do not offer an abundance of places to hide. The last place that Comanches would set an ambush would be at the end of a pass which affords the Comanche's victim a clear line of withdrawal. Logically, the Comanche would favor a wide-open portion of the Great Plains or Llano Estacado, which would mean that the Comanches could attack from any direction.

== The Battle of Bandera Pass ==
The exact date of this battle is no longer known, though the time it occurred is. Captain Hays and his men, approximately 50 in number, arrived at the Pass about 11 o'clock in the morning and were surprised and confronted by a large band of Comanches. Hays' reports indicate his men were discomforted by the size of the force against them, but the captain is reported to have ordered them to "dismount and tie those horses, we can whip them. No doubt about that."

This battle is where the repeating revolvers began to change the tide of the struggle against the Comanche. The Colt revolvers had just been invented, and Captain Hays and his men were lucky enough to be armed with fifty or sixty of these weapons, which the Rangers reported were unknown to the Comanche. Although they reported being badly outnumbered, the new weapons enabled the rangers to hold their ground. The fierce battle began at 11 o'clock in the morning, according to records left by Hays, and lasted all day, with the sides finally ending the conflict as night fell.

== After the battle ==
Finally, the Comanche retreated, and the Rangers followed. Both sides buried their dead, with the Rangers losing five men and many wounded. But the fact that 50 Rangers had held their ground against hundreds of the Comanche marked a change in the way the frontier wars would be fought, and marked the turning of the tide in the war between Texas and the Comanches.
