= Samuel Highsmith =

Texian soldier (1804–1849)

- Born: 1804; Boone County, Kentucky, US
- Died: January 10, 1849 (aged 44–45); San Antonio, Texas, US
- Military career
- Allegiance: Republic of Texas; United States
- Rank: Captain
- Wars: Texas Revolution; Texas–Indian wars; Mexican–American War

Samuel Highsmith (1804–1849) was a Texian veteran of the Texas Revolution and the Mexican War and a Texas Ranger. Of his seven children, two became noted Confederate officers: Henry Albert and Malcijah Benjamin Highsmith.

== Sources ==
- Cutrer, Thomas W. (October 30, 2019). "Highsmith, Samuel (1804–1849)". Handbook of Texas (online ed.). Texas State Historical Association.
