= Medina Independent School District =

School district in Texas, United States

Location
- Medina, Texas ESC Region 20 USA
- Coordinates: 29.7997°N 99.2480°W

District information
- Type: Public Independent school district
- Grades: EE through 12
- Superintendent: Kevin Newsom
- Schools: 1
- NCES District ID: 4830030

Students and staff
- Students: 266 (2012-13)
- Teachers: 34.76 (2011-12) (on full-time equivalent (FTE) basis)
- Student–teacher ratio: 8.29 (2011-12)

Other information
- Website: Medina ISD

Medina Independent School District is a public school district based in the community of Medina, Texas (USA). Located in Bandera County, a small portion of the district extends into Kerr County.

In 2009, the school district was rated "academically acceptable" by the Texas Education Agency.

== Schools ==
In the 2012–2013 school year, the district had students in two schools.

- Medina High School (Grades 7–12)
- Medina Elementary School (Grades EE-6)
