= Bandera (moth) =

Scientific classification
- Kingdom: Animalia
- Phylum: Arthropoda
- Clade: Pancrustacea
- Class: Insecta
- Order: Lepidoptera
- Family: Pyralidae
- Subfamily: Phycitinae
- Genus: Bandera; Ragonot, 1887

Synonyms
- Nasutes Hampson, 1930

Genus of moths

Bandera is a genus of snout moths. It was described by Émile Louis Ragonot in 1887 and is known from the United States.

== Species ==
- Bandera binotella (Zeller, 1872)
- Bandera cupidinella Hulst, 1888
- Bandera virginella Dyar, 1908
