= Malcijah Benjamin Highsmith =

Texian veteran (1827–1893)

Malcijah B. Highsmith
- Born: May 17, 1827; Old Caney (now Brazoria County, Texas)
- Died: May 4, 1893 (aged 65); Bastrop, Texas, US
- Military career
- Allegiance: Republic of Texas; United States; Confederate States
- Rank: Fourth sergeant (USA); Captain (CSA)
- Wars: Texas Revolution; Mexican–American War; Texas–Indian wars; American Civil War

Malcijah Benjamin ("Kige") Highsmith (1827–1893) was a Texian veteran of the Revolution, an American veteran of the Mexican War, and a Confederate veteran of the Civil War. He was also a noted Freemason.

== Life ==
He took part in the Runaway Scrape during the Texas Revolution while still a boy, and served under his father, Samuel Highsmith, in the Mexican War. In February 1850 he was commissioned 2nd lieutenant, Texas Rangers, under Captain John S. Ford, and was involved in several fights with Comanches. He returned to his farm in 1852, and by 1860 he reportedly had $2,000 in real estate and other assets. With the outbreak of the Civil War, he was elected captain of Company D, 12th Texas Cavalry Regiment. He died in Bastrop in 1893.

Highsmith was the brother of Confederate soldier and Texas Ranger Henry Albert Highsmith.

== Sources ==
- Cutrer, Thomas W. (October 30, 2019a). "Highsmith, Malcijah Benjamin (1827–1893)". Handbook of Texas (online ed.). Texas State Historical Association.
- Cutrer, Thomas W. (October 30, 2019b). "Highsmith, Henry Albert (1843–1930)". Handbook of Texas (Online ed.). Texas State Historical Association.
