= Neil H. Bander =

American physician and researcher

- Born: Boston, Massachusetts, U.S.
- Education: Johns Hopkins University; University of Connecticut School of Medicine
- Known for: PSMA-targeted cancer therapy
- Awards: Clark Cutler Medal for Surgical Innovation; Prostate Cancer Foundation Awards; Ferdinand C. Valentine Fellowship
- Scientific career
- Fields: Urological oncology, Tumor immunology
- Workplaces: Weill Cornell Medicine

Neil H. Bander is an American surgeon-scientist with a clinical specialty in urological oncology and a research focus in tumor immunology. He is the Bernard and Josephine Chaus Professor of Urological Oncology and Director of Urological Oncology Research at Weill Cornell Medicine in New York City. Bander is recognized, along with Warren (Skip) D. W. Heston, as one of the two “Founding Fathers of PSMA (Prostate-Specific Membrane Antigen) Technology.”

== Early life and education ==
Bander was born in Boston, Massachusetts. He obtained a Bachelor of Arts degree in Biology from Johns Hopkins University, where his senior research thesis led to a pre-doctoral research fellowship under Dr. Sidney Farber at the Children’s Cancer Research Foundation (now the Dana-Farber Cancer Institute) and Harvard Medical School. He earned his M.D. from the University of Connecticut School of Medicine.

== Medical training ==
Bander completed his general surgery residency at New York University-Bellevue Hospital Center, followed by a residency in urology at the University of Connecticut Medical Center. He then undertook an NIH Immunobiology Fellowship under Lloyd J. Old at Memorial Sloan Kettering Cancer Center (MSKCC). Near the end of this fellowship, he was offered a clinical fellowship in urological oncology by Willet F. Whitmore, Jr., also at MSKCC.

== Career ==
Following his fellowships, Bander joined Weill Cornell Medicine and New York-Presbyterian Hospital as their first faculty member specializing in urologic oncology. He rose through the academic ranks to become the Bernard and Josephine Chaus Professor of Urological Oncology and a member (affiliate) of the MSKCC Division of Urology.

Since the mid-1990s, Bander has focused on PSMA as a target for cancer treatment. His team developed the first series of monoclonal antibodies (mAbs) to the extracellular domain of PSMA, including J591. This became the gold standard mAb, enabling studies of PSMA biology and tumor targeting.

They identified, for the first time, that PSMA was internalized by an endocytic pathway. This opened the door to specific tumor targeting of a cytotoxic payload directly into PSMA-positive cancer cells while sparing PSMA-negative normal cells. Along with collaborators, they defined the MXXXL internalization motif on PSMA's intracellular domain. In 1998, both Bander’s and Heston’s teams showed that PSMA was expressed in the tumor neovasculature of multiple cancers but not normal vasculature. Both the Cornell and MSKCC groups later independently showed that the J591 mAb could be used clinically to target the blood supply of a similarly wide variety of solid tumors.

Bander’s team humanized J591 for clinical trials. Using radiolabeled mAbs and PSMA-targeted PET imaging, they accurately identified cancer spread. Their work laid the foundation for the now standard PSMA PET scan.

They were also first to use 177Lutetium intravenously in trials, validating PSMA as a therapeutic target. This laid the groundwork for the eventual 2022 approval of Lu177 vipivotide tetraxetan (Pluvicto®) for the treatment of prostate cancer..

His recent research continues targeting alpha particles like Actinium-225 (Ac225), which are significantly more potent than beta particles.

Bander has also contributed to PSMA-targeted antibody-drug conjugates (ADCs). His J591 mAb was adopted by Ambrx/Johnson & Johnson for clinical ADC development. As of 2024, over 750 PSMA-related trials are registered on ClinicalTrials.gov.

Before retiring from Weill Cornell in 2023, Bander founded two biotech companies:

- Convergent Therapeutics, Inc. — developing CONV01-alpha (J591-Ac-225)
- XenImmune Therapeutics, Inc. — developing tumor antigen rejection strategies based on transplant immunology.

== Research and publications ==
Bander has authored over 200 peer-reviewed papers and holds more than 130 U.S. and international patents in oncology research and drug development.

== Honors and awards ==
- Ferdinand C. Valentine Fellowship, New York Academy of Medicine
- James Ewing Fellow’s Research Award, Society of Surgical Oncology
- Research awards from German and Japanese Urology Societies
- Prostate Cancer Foundation research awards
- Clark Cutler Medal for Surgical Innovation, Royal College of Surgeons (London)
- Chung Lee Lectureship, Northwestern Medicine (2024)

== Professional affiliations ==
Bander is a fellow of the American College of Surgeons and a member of:

- American Urological Association
- Society of Urologic Oncology
- American Society of Clinical Oncology
- American Association for Cancer Research

== Selected publications ==
- Motzer RJ, Bander NH, Nanus DM. (1996). Renal-cell carcinoma. N Engl J Med, 335(12): 865–875.
- Gnarra JR, Tory K, Weng Y, et al. (1994). Mutations of the VHL tumour suppressor gene in renal carcinoma. Nature Genetics, 7(1): 85–90.
- Hrkach J, Von Hoff D, Ali MM, et al. (2012). PSMA-targeted docetaxel nanoparticle. Sci Transl Med, 4(128): 128ra39.
- Chang SS, Reuter VE, Heston WDW, Bander NH, et al. (1999). Anti-PSMA antibodies confirm expression in neovasculature. Cancer Res, 59(13): 3192–3198.
- Sternberg CN, Yagoda A, Scher HI, et al. (1989). MVAC chemotherapy in urothelial carcinoma. Cancer, 64(12): 2448–2458.
- Liu H, Moy P, Kim S, et al. (1997). PSMA antibodies react with tumor vascular endothelium. Cancer Res, 57(17): 3629–3634.
- Bander NH, Milowsky MI, Nanus DM, et al. (2005). Phase I trial of 177Lu-J591. J Clin Oncol, 23(21): 4591–4601.
- Chakravarty D, Sboner A, Nair SS, et al. (2014). NEAT1 lncRNA in prostate cancer. Nat Commun, 5: 5383.
- McDevitt MR, Ma D, Lai LT, et al. (2001). Tumor therapy with atomic nanogenerators. Science, 294(5546): 1537–1540.
- Liu H, Rajasekaran AK, Moy P, et al. (1998). Internalization of PSMA. Cancer Res, 58(18): 4055–4060.
