= Bandera Pass =

Coordinates: 29.8587°N 99.1054°W

Bandera Pass [elevation 1,745 feet (532 m)] is a mountain pass in Bandera County, Texas, in the United States. On the divide between watersheds of the Guadalupe and Medina Rivers, it is located on State Highway 173 10 miles (16 km) north of the town of Bandera.

The Battle of Bandera Pass, a part of the Texas-Indian wars, took place at the pass in 1843. (Others say this battle was in 1841.)

Nearby Bandera Creek was named after Bandera Pass.
