= Bandera Independent School District =

School district in Texas, United States

Location
- 815 Pecan Street, Bandera, Texas, 78003 ESC Region 20 USA
- Coordinates: 29°43′26″N 99°04′36″W

District information
- Type: Public Independent school district
- Grades: EE through 12
- Superintendent: Gary L Bitzkie
- Schools: 4 (2011-12)
- NCES District ID: 4809360

Students and staff
- Students: 2447 (2010-11)
- Teachers: 178.26 (2011-12) (on full-time equivalent (FTE) basis)
- Student–teacher ratio: 13.73 (2011-12)
- Athletic conference: UIL Class 4A-2
- District mascot: Bulldogs
- Colors: Royal Blue, White

Other information
- TEA District Accountability Rating for 2011: Recognized
- Website: Bandera ISD

Bandera Independent School District is a public school district based in Bandera, Texas, United States. In addition to Bandera, the district also serves the communities of Lakehills, Bandera Falls, Pipe Creek, and Tarpley.

== Finances ==
As of the 2010-2011 school year, the appraised valuation of property in the district was $1,291,941,000. The maintenance tax rate was $0.104 and the bond tax rate was $0.015 per $100 of appraised valuation.

== Academic achievement ==
In 2011, the school district was rated "recognized" by the Texas Education Agency.

== Schools ==
In the 2012-2013 school year, the district had students in four schools.

- Bandera High School (grades 9-12), a 2001-02 National Blue Ribbon School
- Bandera Middle (grades 6-8)
- Alkek Elementary (early childhood education-grade 5)
- Hill Country Elementary (early childhood education-grade 5), located in Bandera Falls

== See also ==
- List of school districts in Texas
