= Pipe Creek, Texas =

- Unincorporated community
- Location within Texas Location within the United States
- Coordinates: 29°43′25″N 98°56′09″W
- Country: United States
- State: Texas
- County: Bandera
- Elevation: 1,362 ft (415 m)
- Time zone: UTC-6 (Central (CST))
  - Summer (DST): UTC-5 (CDT)
- ZIP code: 78063
- Area code: 830
- GNIS feature ID: 1344123

Pipe Creek is an unincorporated community in Bandera County, Texas, United States. According to the Handbook of Texas, it had a population of approximately 66 in 1990. It is part of the San Antonio Metropolitan Statistical Area.

== History ==
A post office called Pipe Creek has been in operation since 1873.

The American Goat Society is headquartered in the community.

== Geography ==
Pipe Creek is located on Texas State Highway 16, about 9 mi (14 km) east of Bandera and 30 mi (48 km) north of San Antonio in central Bandera County.

Other notable places located in Pipe Creek include churches, the public library, and parts of the Bandera Falls residential community. Large portions of the area are accessed from FM1283.

== Education ==
Pipe Creek's first school was built in 1881.

The Bandera Independent School District serves area students. The Bandera Independent School District also consists of both private and public schools. Two local schools include Hill Country Elementary School and Pipe Creek Christian School.

== See also ==
- List of unincorporated communities in Texas
