= Bandera County, Texas =

County in Texas, United States

- County
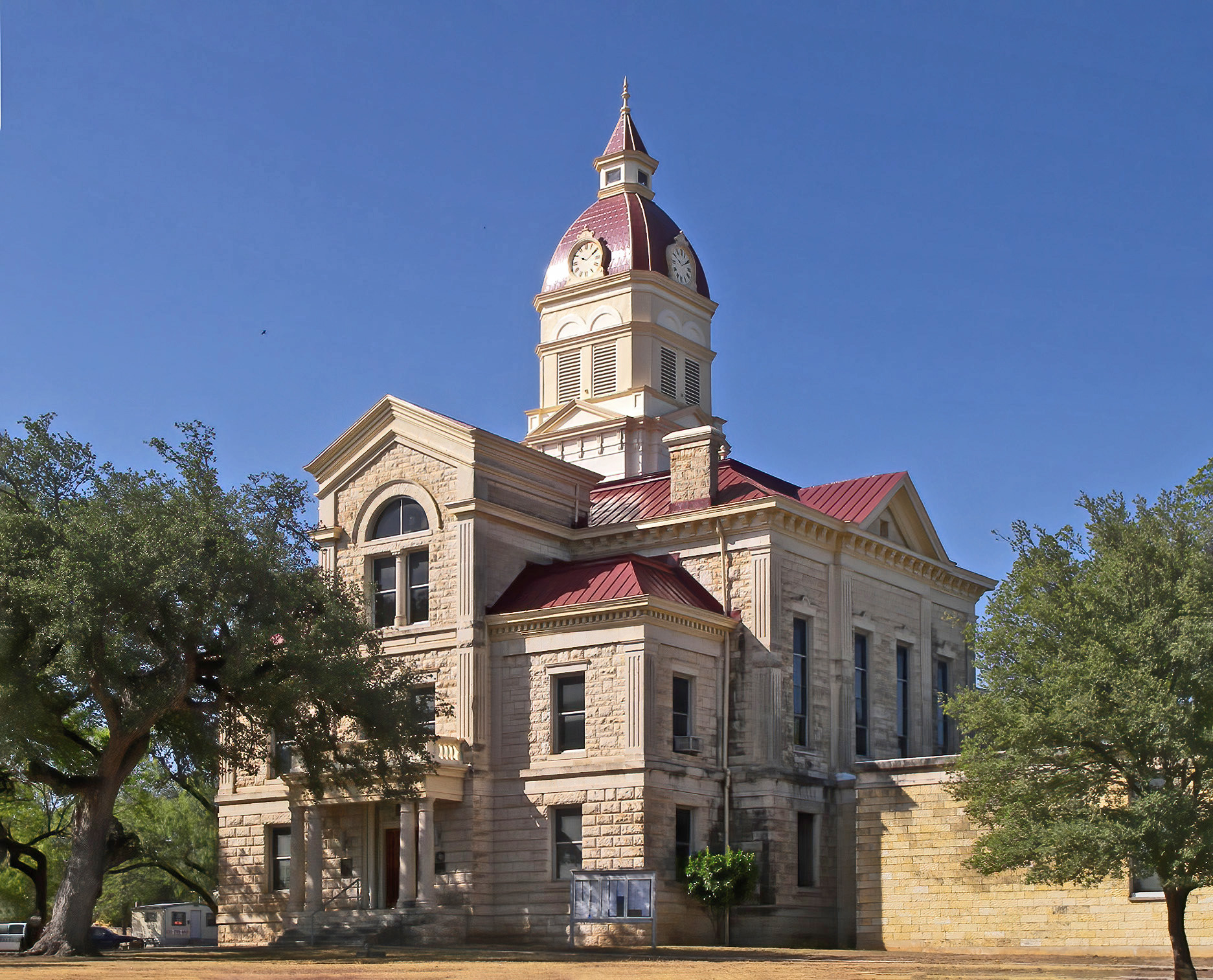
- The Bandera County Courthouse in Bandera. The building was added to the National Register of Historic Places on October 31, 1979.

- Flag Seal

- Location within the U.S. state of Texas
- Coordinates: 29°44′N 99°14′W
- Country: United States
- State: Texas
- Founded: 1856
- Named for: Bandera Pass
- Seat: Bandera
- Largest community: Lakehills

Area
  - Total: 798 sq mi (2,070 km^{2})
  - Land: 791 sq mi (2,050 km^{2})
  - Water: 6.7 sq mi (17 km^{2}) 0.8%

Population (2020)
  - Total: 20,851
  - Estimate (2026): 22,962 ▲
  - Density: 26.4/sq mi (10.2/km^{2})
- Time zone: UTC−6 (Central)
  - Summer (DST): UTC−5 (CDT)
- Congressional district: 21st
- Website: www.banderacounty.gov

Bandera County (Spanish: "flag", /bænˈdɛrə/ ban-DERR-ə) is a county in the U.S. state of Texas. It is located in the Hill Country and its county seat is Bandera. Bandera county was settled by German and Polish emigrants in the mid 1800s. Many residents are descendants of those same emigrants.

As of the 2020 census, the population is 20,851. Bandera County is part of the San Antonio-New Braunfels metropolitan statistical area.

The county is officially recognized as the "Cowboy Capital of the World" by the Texas Legislature.

== History ==
In 1856, the Texas Legislature established Bandera County from portions of Bexar and Uvalde Counties, and named the county and its seat for Bandera Pass, which uses the Spanish word for flag.

=== Native Americans and Texas-Indian Wars ===
Although the county's earliest evidence of human habitation dates from 8000 to 4000 BC, the county's earliest known ethnology places Lipan Apache and later Comanche settlements in the area during the 17th century. During the early to late 1800s, the county was a target for several Native American raids. Examples of this include a skirmish between migrating Shawnee Indians and Comanches in 1832 at Bandera Pass. Bandera Pass was also the site of the 1841 Battle of Bandera Pass between the Texas Rangers and the Comanche. In July of 1854, Texas Rangers engaged in a small battle with Seminole Indians near Bandera. Also, in 1862, settlers skirmished with Comanches near Medina, killing six warriors. In 1866, Lipan Apaches killed Thomas Click three miles west of Bandera. The last Indian raid in the county occurred on December 29, 1876, when Jack Phillips was killed by Indians, probably Lipan Apaches or Kickapoos, at Seco Pass in the southwestern part of the county, marking the end of the American Indian Wars in the county.

=== 19th century ===
In 1841, John Coffee Hays and a troop of Texas Rangers defeated a large party of Comanche warriors, thereby pacifying the region in what became known as the Battle of Bandera Pass.

In 1853, John James and Charles S. DeMontel conducted a land survey and planned the town of Bandera. The town was then settled by A. M. Milstead, Thomas Odem, P.D. Saner, and their families along the river. The families began making cypress shingles. James, DeMontel and Company built a horse-powered sawmill and opened a store within a year. In the wake of successive national insurrections crushed by Prussia, Austria and Russia, 16 Polish families arrived in Bandera in 1855 and begin working in James and DeMontel's sawmill. Around this time August Klappenbach opens the first store and post office in Bandera. In 1856, the Texas Legislature established and formally organized Bandera County from portions of Bexar County.

By 1860, the population grew to 399, which included 12 slaves. By 1880, the ranching of sheep and Angora goats become more profitable than farming.

=== 20th century ===
In 1920, Cora and Ed Buck launched Bandera's tourist industry by taking boarders at their ranch, and by 1933, Frontier Times Museum opened to the public.

During the last 30 years of the 20th century, with an estimated 80% of its land dedicated to farming and ranching industries, the county government facilitated three major actions to preserve its natural heritage: the Lost Maples State Natural Area which opened to the public in 1979, the Hill Country State Natural Area which opened to the public in 1984, and the Nature Conservancy purchased 1,400 acres (5.7 km^{2}) of the Love Creek Ranch from Baxter and Carol Adams to create the Love Creek Preserve in 2000.

== Geography ==
According to the U.S. Census Bureau, the county has a total area of 798 square miles (2,070 km^{2}), of which 791 square miles (2,050 km^{2}) is land and 6.7 square miles (17 km^{2}) (0.8%) is water. Bandera County is a part of the Greater San Antonio area and is located on the Edwards Plateau.

=== Major highways ===
- State Highway 16
- State Highway 46
- State Highway 173
- Park Road 37
- Ranch to Market Road 187
- Ranch to Market Road 337
- Ranch to Market Road 1077
- Farm to Market Road 1283
- Ranch to Market Road 2828
- Farm to Market Road 3240

=== Adjacent counties ===
- Kerr County (north)
- Kendall County (northeast)
- Bexar County (southeast)
- Medina County (south)
- Uvalde County (southwest)
- Real County (west)

== Demographics ==
Historical population
| Census | Pop. | Note | %± |
|---|---|---|---|
| 1860 | 399 | | — |
| 1870 | 649 | | 62.7% |
| 1880 | 2,158 | | 232.5% |
| 1890 | 3,795 | | 75.9% |
| 1900 | 5,332 | | 40.5% |
| 1910 | 4,921 | | −7.7% |
| 1920 | 4,001 | | −18.7% |
| 1930 | 3,784 | | −5.4% |
| 1940 | 4,234 | | 11.9% |
| 1950 | 4,410 | | 4.2% |
| 1960 | 3,892 | | −11.7% |
| 1970 | 4,747 | | 22.0% |
| 1980 | 7,084 | | 49.2% |
| 1990 | 10,562 | | 49.1% |
| 2000 | 17,645 | | 67.1% |
| 2010 | 20,485 | | 16.1% |
| 2020 | 20,851 | | 1.8% |
| 2025 (est.) | 22,876 | ▲ | 9.7% |
U.S. Decennial Census; 1850–1900 1910; 1920 1930 1940; 1950 1960 1970; 1980 1990 2000; 2010 2020

=== 2020 census ===
As of the 2020 census, the county had a population of 20,851. The median age was 53.8 years. 16.8% of residents were under the age of 18 and 28.7% of residents were 65 years of age or older. For every 100 females there were 97.7 males, and for every 100 females age 18 and over there were 96.8 males age 18 and over.

The racial makeup of the county was 82.1% White, 0.5% Black or African American, 0.8% American Indian and Alaska Native, 0.5% Asian, 0.1% Native Hawaiian and Pacific Islander, 4.1% from some other race, and 12.0% from two or more races. Hispanic or Latino residents of any race comprised 19.2% of the population.

<0.1% of residents lived in urban areas, while 100.0% lived in rural areas.

There were 8,847 households in the county, of which 21.7% had children under the age of 18 living in them. Of all households, 54.2% were married-couple households, 18.3% were households with a male householder and no spouse or partner present, and 22.6% were households with a female householder and no spouse or partner present. About 27.7% of all households were made up of individuals and 14.2% had someone living alone who was 65 years of age or older.

There were 11,400 housing units, of which 22.4% were vacant. Among occupied housing units, 83.4% were owner-occupied and 16.6% were renter-occupied. The homeowner vacancy rate was 2.0% and the rental vacancy rate was 10.0%.

=== Racial and ethnic composition ===
Bandera County, Texas – Racial and ethnic composition Note: the US Census treats Hispanic/Latino as an ethnic category. This table excludes Latinos from the racial categories and assigns them to a separate category. Hispanics/Latinos may be of any race.
| Race / Ethnicity (NH = Non-Hispanic) | Pop 1980 | Pop 1990 | Pop 2000 | Pop 2010 | Pop 2020 | % 1980 | % 1990 | % 2000 | % 2010 | % 2020 |
|---|---|---|---|---|---|---|---|---|---|---|
| White alone (NH) | 6,158 | 9,276 | 14,833 | 16,576 | 15,595 | 86.93% | 87.82% | 84.06% | 80.92% | 74.79% |
| Black or African American alone (NH) | 20 | 23 | 50 | 90 | 102 | 0.28% | 0.22% | 0.28% | 0.44% | 0.49% |
| Native American or Alaska Native alone (NH) | 20 | 62 | 116 | 121 | 101 | 0.28% | 0.59% | 0.66% | 0.59% | 0.48% |
| Asian alone (NH) | 10 | 25 | 47 | 55 | 95 | 0.14% | 0.24% | 0.27% | 0.27% | 0.46% |
| Native Hawaiian or Pacific Islander alone (NH) | x | x | 6 | 0 | 11 | x | x | 0.03% | 0.00% | 0.05% |
| Other race alone (NH) | 13 | 4 | 13 | 18 | 71 | 0.18% | 0.04% | 0.07% | 0.09% | 0.34% |
| Mixed race or Multiracial (NH) | x | x | 196 | 210 | 866 | x | x | 1.11% | 1.03% | 4.15% |
| Hispanic or Latino (any race) | 863 | 1,172 | 2,384 | 3,415 | 4,010 | 12.18% | 11.10% | 13.51% | 16.67% | 19.23% |
| Total | 7,084 | 10,562 | 17,645 | 20,485 | 20,851 | 100.00% | 100.00% | 100.00% | 100.00% | 100.00% |

=== 2010 census ===
As of the 2010 census, there were 20,485 people living in the county. 92.8% were White, 0.8% Native American, 0.5% Black or African American, 0.3% Asian, 3.8% of some other race and 1.8% of two or more races. 16.7% were Hispanic or Latino (of any race). 17.6% were of German, 13.7% English, 10.2% Irish and 10.1% American ancestry.

=== 2000 census ===
As of the 2000 census, there were 17,645 people, 7,010 households, and 5,061 families living in the county. The population density was 22 people per square mile (8.5 people/km^{2}). There were 9,503 housing units at an average density of 12 units per square mile (4.6/km^{2}). The racial makeup of the county was 94.02% White, 0.33% Black or African American, 0.90% Native American, 0.28% Asian, 0.06% Pacific Islander, 2.55% from other races, and 1.86% from two or more races. 13.51% of the population were Hispanic or Latino of any race.

There were 7,010 households, out of which 29.10% had children under the age of 18 living with them, 60.80% were married couples living together, 7.30% had a female householder with no husband present, and 27.80% were non-families. 23.20% of all households were made up of individuals, and 9.90% had someone living alone who was 65 years of age or older. The average household size was 2.49 and the average family size was 2.92.

In the county, the population was spread out, with 24.70% under the age of 18, 5.80% from 18 to 24, 25.70% from 25 to 44, 27.60% from 45 to 64, and 16.20% who were 65 years of age or older. The median age was 41 years. For every 100 females, there were 99.00 males. For every 100 females age 18 and over, there were 98.30 males.

The median income for a household in the county was $39,013, and the median income for a family was $45,906. Males had a median income of $31,733 versus $24,451 for females. The per capita income for the county was $19,635. About 7.70% of families and 10.80% of the population were below the poverty line, including 12.20% of those under age 18 and 9.40% of those age 65 or over.

== Education ==
The following school districts serve Bandera County:

- Bandera Independent School District
- Medina Independent School District (partial)
- Northside Independent School District (partial)
- Utopia Independent School District (partial)

All of the county is in the service area of Alamo Community College District.

== Communities ==
=== City ===
- Bandera (county seat)

=== Census-designated places ===
- Lake Medina Shores (partly in Medina County)
- Lakehills (largest community)

=== Unincorporated communities ===
- Bandera Falls
- Medina
- Pipe Creek
- Tarpley
- Vanderpool

=== Ghost town ===
- Tuff

== Politics ==
United States presidential election results for Bandera County, Texas
| Year | Republican | | Democratic | | Third party(ies) | |
| Year | No. | % | No. | % | No. | % |
|---|---|---|---|---|---|---|
| 1912 | 158 | 22.25% | 412 | 58.03% | 140 | 19.72% |
| 1916 | 168 | 22.34% | 537 | 71.41% | 47 | 6.25% |
| 1920 | 249 | 40.75% | 311 | 50.90% | 51 | 8.35% |
| 1924 | 442 | 47.84% | 425 | 46.00% | 57 | 6.17% |
| 1928 | 936 | 74.52% | 317 | 25.24% | 3 | 0.24% |
| 1932 | 359 | 28.74% | 883 | 70.70% | 7 | 0.56% |
| 1936 | 431 | 36.81% | 720 | 61.49% | 20 | 1.71% |
| 1940 | 432 | 32.80% | 881 | 66.89% | 4 | 0.30% |
| 1944 | 634 | 50.40% | 532 | 42.29% | 92 | 7.31% |
| 1948 | 570 | 50.35% | 445 | 39.31% | 117 | 10.34% |
| 1952 | 1,350 | 78.95% | 358 | 20.94% | 2 | 0.12% |
| 1956 | 1,083 | 76.05% | 336 | 23.60% | 5 | 0.35% |
| 1960 | 942 | 63.48% | 539 | 36.32% | 3 | 0.20% |
| 1964 | 762 | 46.49% | 876 | 53.45% | 1 | 0.06% |
| 1968 | 842 | 46.78% | 535 | 29.72% | 423 | 23.50% |
| 1972 | 1,796 | 79.50% | 434 | 19.21% | 29 | 1.28% |
| 1976 | 1,554 | 56.18% | 1,183 | 42.77% | 29 | 1.05% |
| 1980 | 2,373 | 70.63% | 894 | 26.61% | 93 | 2.77% |
| 1984 | 3,152 | 80.04% | 771 | 19.58% | 15 | 0.38% |
| 1988 | 3,435 | 72.15% | 1,251 | 26.28% | 75 | 1.58% |
| 1992 | 2,674 | 50.24% | 1,059 | 19.90% | 1,589 | 29.86% |
| 1996 | 3,700 | 65.22% | 1,383 | 24.38% | 590 | 10.40% |
| 2000 | 5,613 | 77.18% | 1,426 | 19.61% | 234 | 3.22% |
| 2004 | 6,933 | 79.32% | 1,738 | 19.88% | 70 | 0.80% |
| 2008 | 6,935 | 74.59% | 2,250 | 24.20% | 112 | 1.20% |
| 2012 | 7,426 | 78.60% | 1,864 | 19.73% | 158 | 1.67% |
| 2016 | 8,163 | 79.89% | 1,726 | 16.89% | 329 | 3.22% |
| 2020 | 10,057 | 79.03% | 2,505 | 19.68% | 164 | 1.29% |
| 2024 | 10,939 | 80.43% | 2,532 | 18.62% | 129 | 0.95% |

United States Senate election results for Bandera County, Texas1
| Year | Republican | | Democratic | | Third party(ies) | |
| Year | No. | % | No. | % | No. | % |
|---|---|---|---|---|---|---|
| 2024 | 10,472 | 77.40% | 2,735 | 20.21% | 323 | 2.39% |

United States Senate election results for Bandera County, Texas2
| Year | Republican | | Democratic | | Third party(ies) | |
| Year | No. | % | No. | % | No. | % |
|---|---|---|---|---|---|---|
| 2020 | 9,957 | 79.42% | 2,291 | 18.27% | 289 | 2.31% |

Texas Gubernatorial election results for Bandera County
| Year | Republican | | Democratic | | Third party(ies) | |
| Year | No. | % | No. | % | No. | % |
|---|---|---|---|---|---|---|
| 2022 | 8,527 | 81.36% | 1,816 | 17.33% | 137 | 1.31% |

== See also ==
- List of museums in Central Texas
- National Register of Historic Places listings in Bandera County, Texas
- Recorded Texas Historic Landmarks in Bandera County
