= Bandera, Texas =

Town in Texas, United States

- City
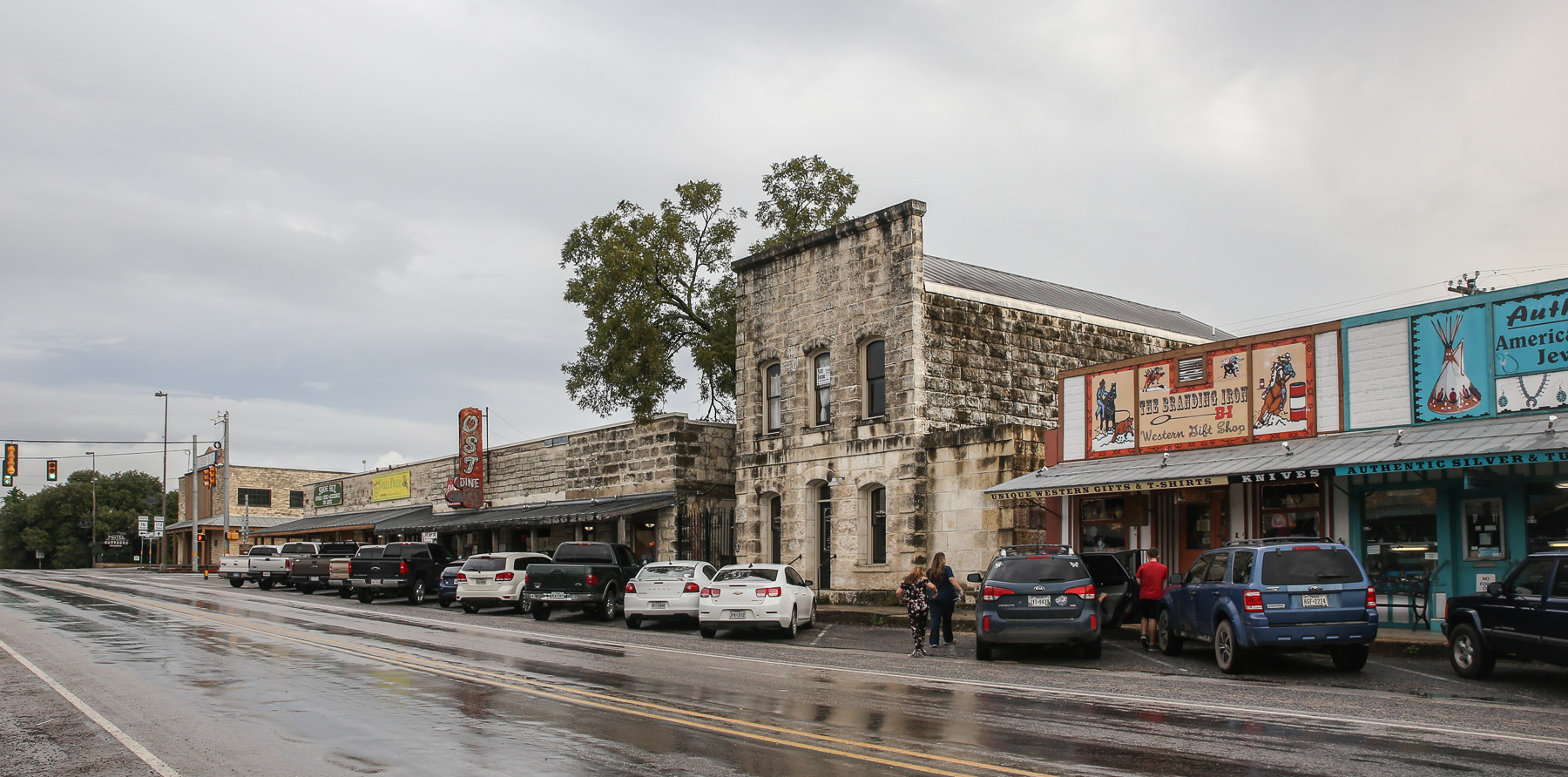
- Downtown Bandera

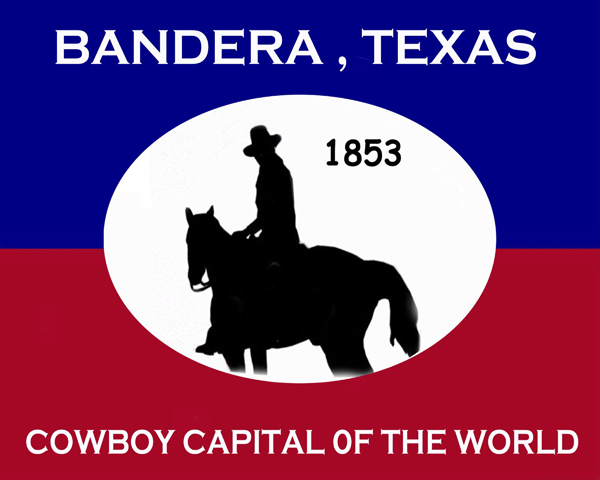
- Flag Logo
- Nickname: "Cowboy Capital of the World"
- Interactive map of Bandera, Texas
- Location in the United States
- Coordinates: 29°43′32″N 99°04′27″W
- Country: United States
- State: Texas
- County: Bandera

Government
  - Mayor: Denise Griffin

Area
  - Total: 1.16 sq mi (3.00 km^{2})
  - Land: 1.16 sq mi (3.00 km^{2})
  - Water: 0.0039 sq mi (0.01 km^{2})
- Elevation: 1,247 ft (380 m)

Population (2020)
  - Total: 829
  - Density: 778.3/sq mi (300.49/km^{2})
- Time zone: UTC−6 (Central (CST))
  - Summer (DST): UTC−5 (CDT)
- ZIP Code: 78003
- Area code: 830
- FIPS code: 48-05528
- GNIS feature ID: 2409781
- Website: www.banderatx.gov

Bandera (Spanish: "flag", /bænˈdɛrə/ ban-DERR-ə) is a city in Bandera County, Texas, United States. It was founded by Polish Catholic settlers from Silesia in the 1850s.The county seat, it lies in the Texas Hill Country, a part of the Edwards Plateau located at the crossroads of the central, southern, and western parts of the state, Its population was 829 at the 2020 census.

Bandera calls itself the "Cowboy Capital of the World", a legacy dating to its days as a staging area for what is today known as Great Western Cattle Trail for the last cattle drives of the 1800s.

== History ==
Bandera was founded in 1855 by Polish Roman Catholic immigrants from the Province of Silesia. They built St. Stanislaus Catholic Church, and many local residents are descended from them.

Bandera is the Spanish word for flag. How the town acquired the name is unknown. One theory is that the town is named after Bandera Pass.

Bandera was a staging area on the Great Western Cattle Trail, during the late 19th century.

The Cabaret Dance Hall opened in 1936. Throughout its history, the dance hall hosted Bob Wills, Doug Sahm, Ernest Tubb, and others. In 2008, the hall was listed as endangered by Preservation Texas. By at least 2013, the hall was closed, by 2015, it was demolished.

Bandera hosts a three-day Cowboy Mardi Gras that attracts over 15,000 people from all over the world to the town.

Bandera had eight surveillance cameras from Flock Safety, but after an uproar in 2026 during several city council meetings, and cameras repeatedly being cut from their poles, the council voted to terminate their contract with Flock. After the vote, a councilman who had supported Flock sarcastically proposed "returning to 1880" and banning internet service and mobile phones in the city in the name of privacy.

== Geography ==
Bandera is located in east-central Bandera County, 47 miles (76 km) northwest of downtown San Antonio, on the Medina River.

According to the United States Census Bureau, the city has a total area of 1.2 sq mi (3.1 km^{2}), of which 0.008 sq mi (0.02 km^{2}) (about 5 acres or 0.55%) is covered by water.

== Demographics ==
Historical population
Census	Pop.	Note	%±
1890	372		—
1900	419		12.6%
1920	700		—
1930	580		−17.1%
1940	1,250		115.5%
1950	1,325		6.0%
1960	1,065		−19.6%
1970	891		−16.3%
1980	947		6.3%
1990	877		−7.4%
2000	957		9.1%
2010	857		−10.4%
2020	829		−3.3%
U.S. Decennial Census

=== 2020 census ===
As of the 2020 census, Bandera had a population of 829. The median age was 51.1 years, 16.4% of residents were under 18, and 30.9% of residents were 65 or older. For every 100 females, there were 86.7 males, and for every 100 females 18 and over, there were 80.9 males 18 and over.

None of the residents lived in urban areas, while all lived in rural areas.

Of the 397 households in Bandera, 28.5% had children under 18 living in them, 33.0% were married-couple households, 19.1% were households with a male householder and no spouse or partner present, and 39.3% were households with a female householder and no spouse or partner present. About 35.6% of all households were made up of individuals, and 18.6% had someone living alone who was 65 or older.

Of the 496 housing units, 20.0% were vacant. Among occupied housing units, 56.7% were owner-occupied and 43.3% were renter-occupied. The homeowner vacancy rate was <0.1% and the rental vacancy rate was 9.9%.

Racial composition as of the 2020 census
Race	Percentage
White	86.1%
Black or African American	0.1%
American Indian and Alaska Native	0.6%
Asian	0.5%
Native Hawaiian and other Pacific Islander	0.4%
Some other race	2.3%
Two or more races	10.0%
Hispanic or Latino (of any race)	22.3%

=== 2000 census ===
As of the 2000 census, 957 people, 408 households, and 239 families were residing in the city. The population density was 820.2/sq mi (316.7/km^{2}). The 488 housing units averaged 418.2/sq mi (161.5/km^{2}). The racial makeup of the city was 94.98% White, 0.21% African American, 0.52% Native American, 2.51% from other races, and 1.78% from two or more races. Hispanics or Latinos of any race were 21.84% of the population.

Of the 408 households, 24.5% had children under 18 living with them, 43.4% were married couples living together, 11.3% had a female householder with no husband present, and 41.4% were not families. About 34.1% of all households were made up of individuals, and 16.2% had someone living alone who was 65 or older. The average household size was 2.22, and the average family size was 2.86.

In the city, the age distribution was 21.5% under 18, 6.7% from 18 to 24, 23.5% from 25 to 44, 23.2% from 45 to 64, and 25.1% who were 65 or older. The median age was 44 years. For every 100 females, there were 83.3 males. For every 100 females 18 and over, there were 82.3 males.

The median income in the city for a household was $31,089 and for a family was $36,500. Males had a median income of $27,604 versus $17,813 for females. The per capita income for the city was $16,502. About 11.0% of families and 15.3% of the population were below the poverty line, including 18.0% of those under 18 and 17.1% of those 65 or over.

== Education ==
Bandera is served by the Bandera Independent School District and home to the Bandera High School Bulldogs.

== Sister cities ==
- Strzelce Opolskie, Poland
- Tysmenytsia, Ukraine

== Gallery ==
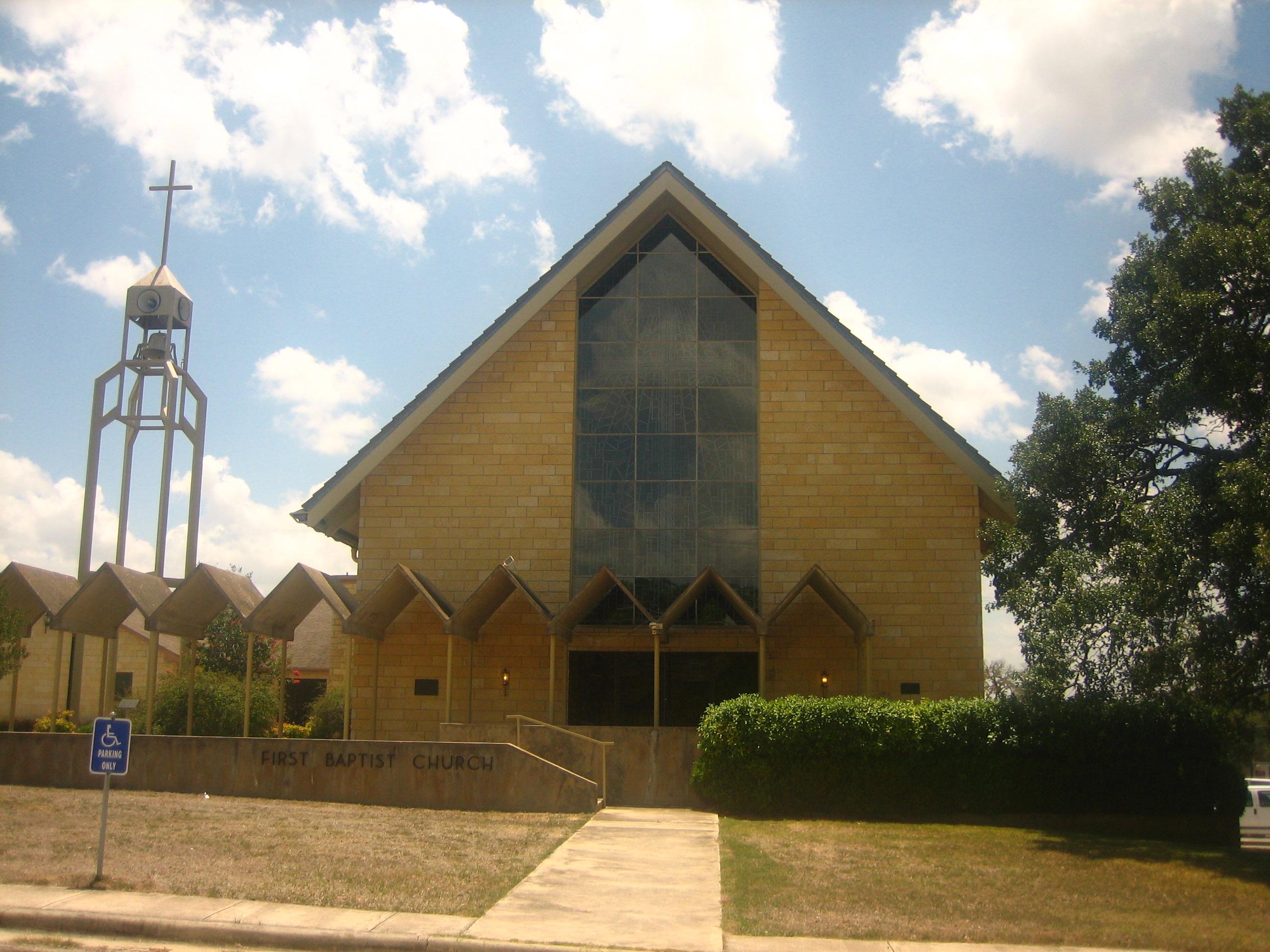
The First Baptist Church of Bandera

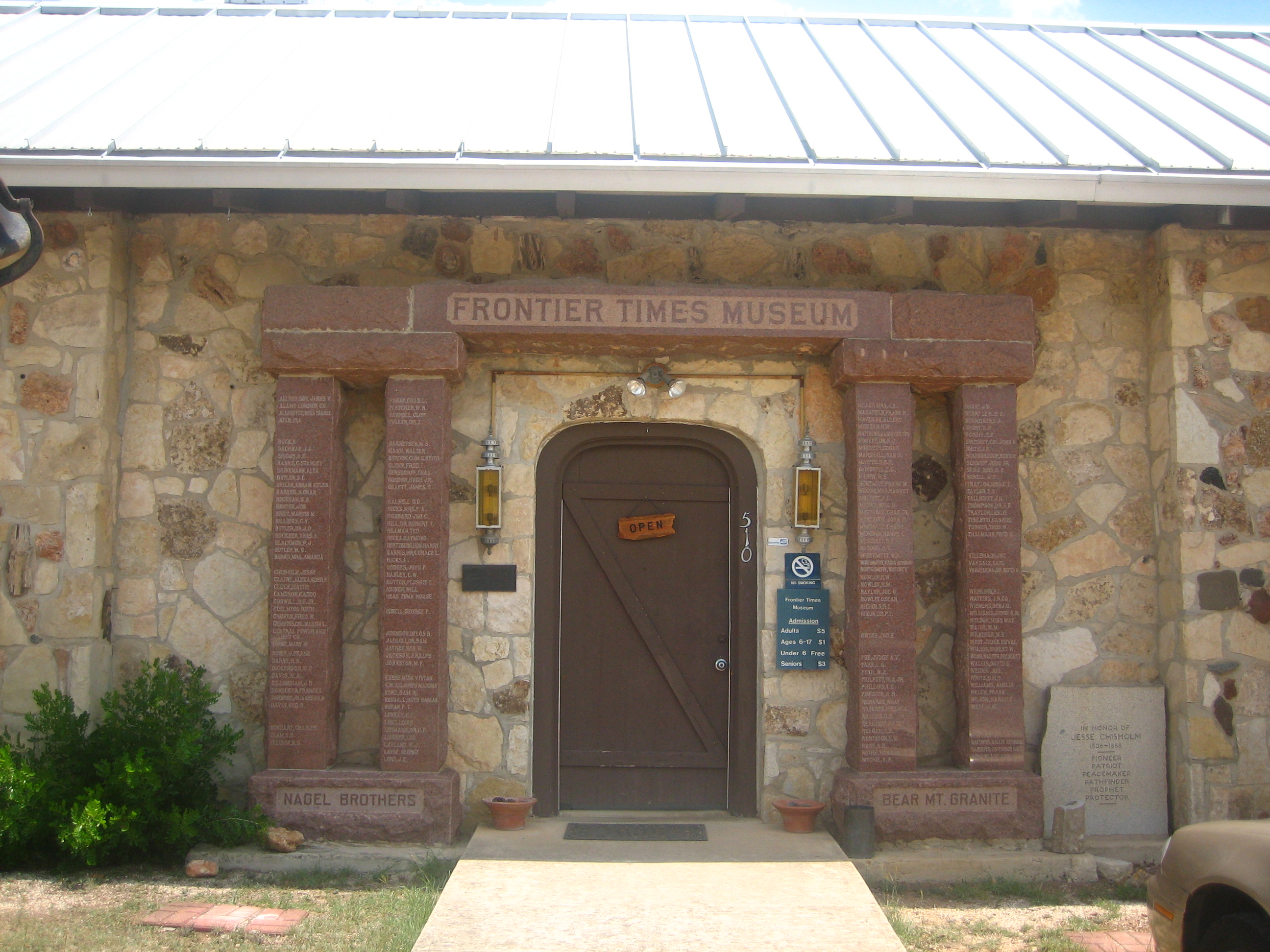
Entrance to the Frontier Times Museum in Bandera

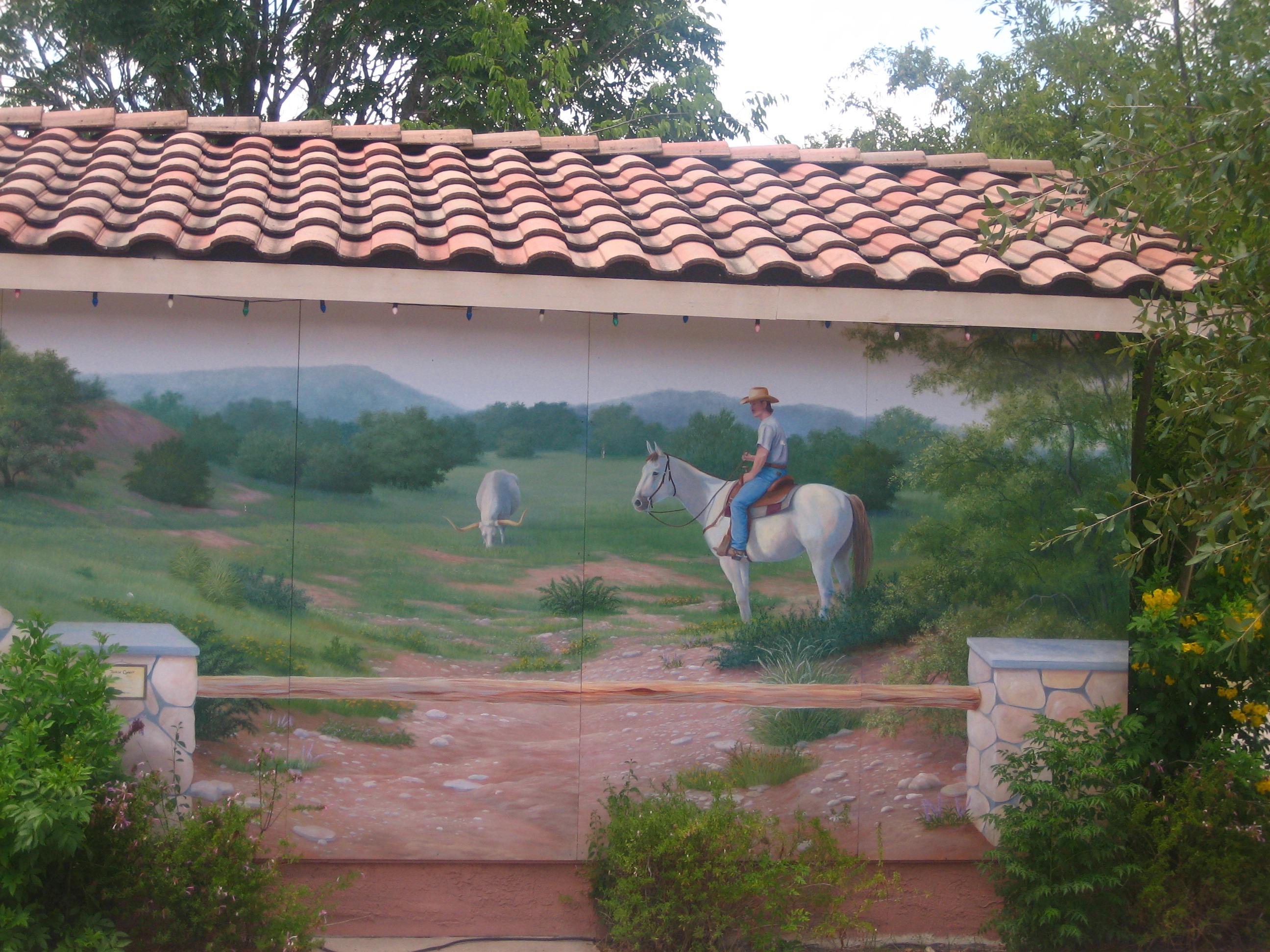
Outdoor mural reflects the theme of Bandera as the "Cowboy Capital of the World"

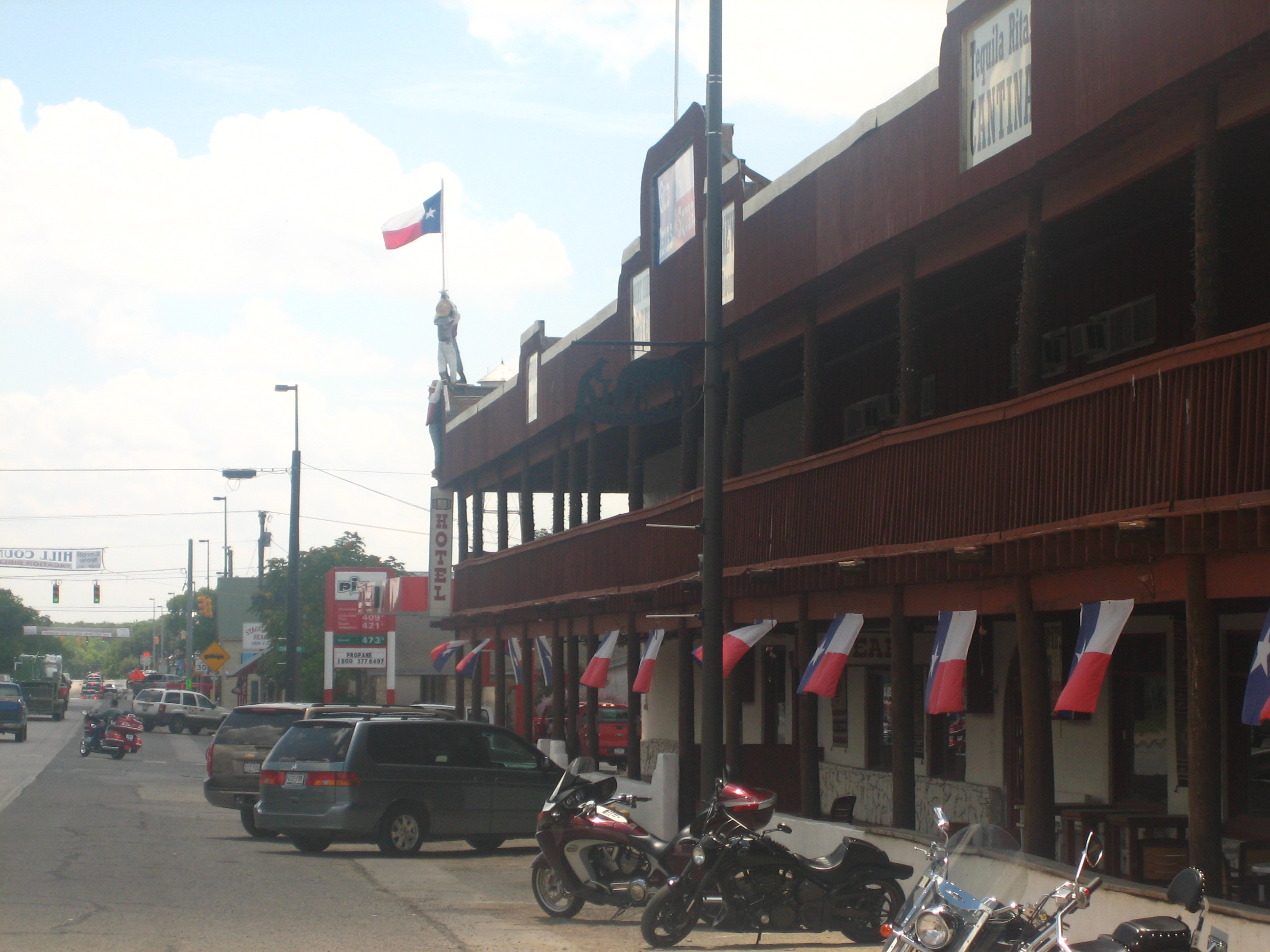
Motorcyclists in Bandera

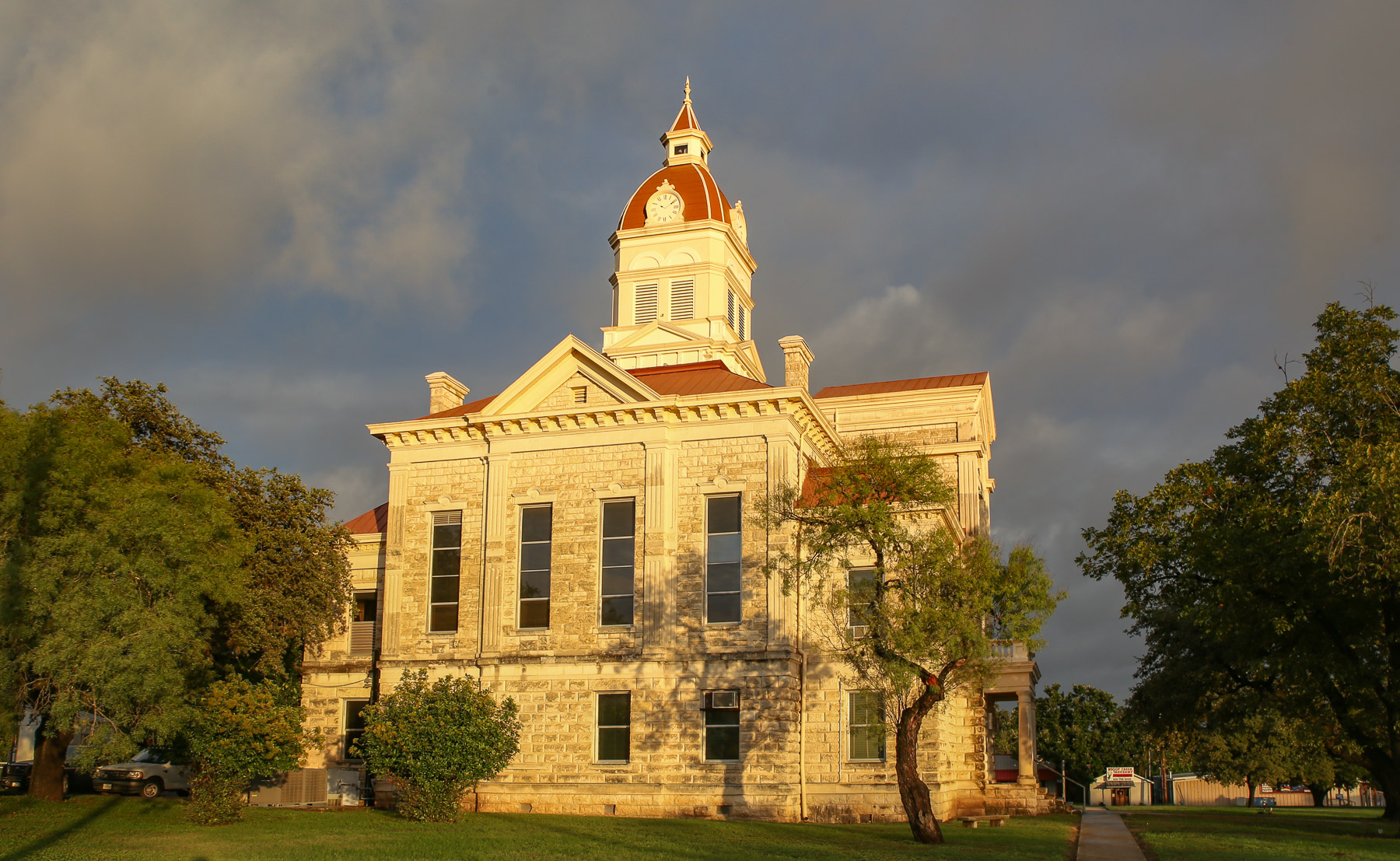
Bandera Courthouse

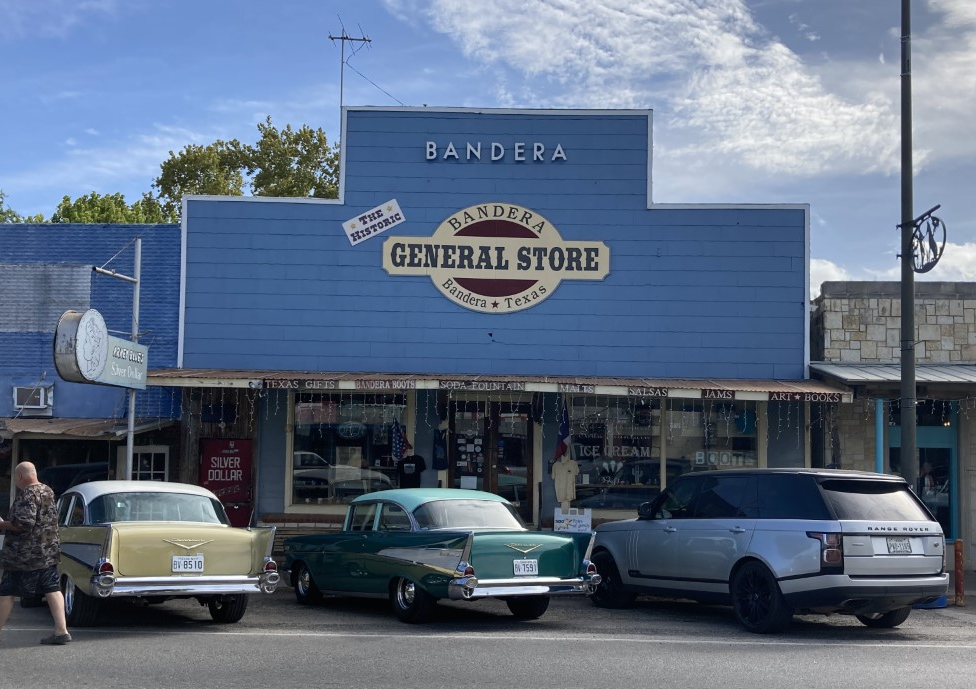
Old downtown store

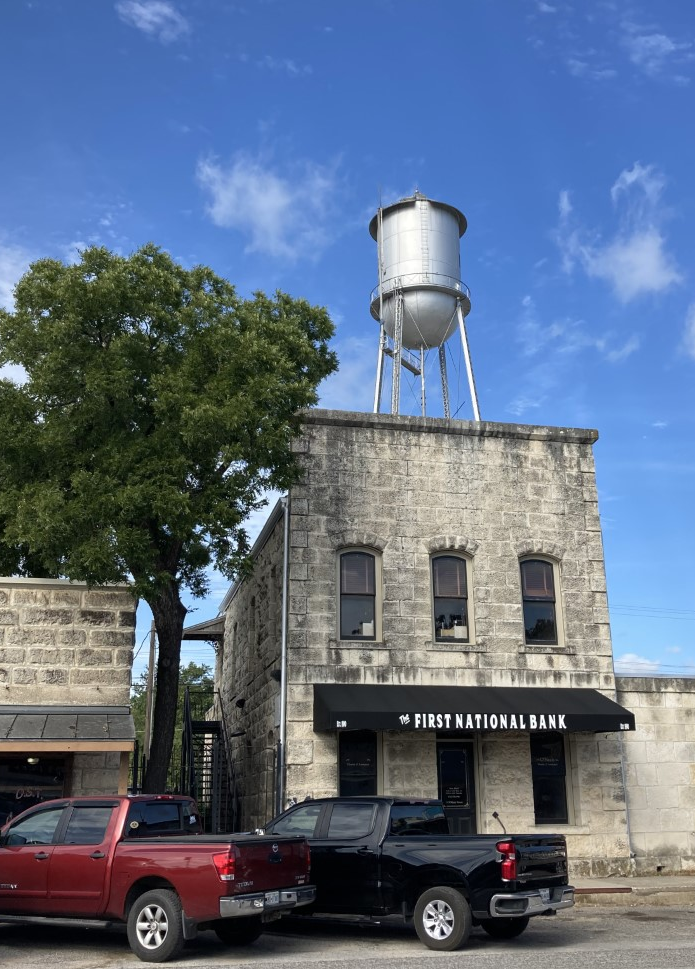
Old bank on Main St. and an older water tower

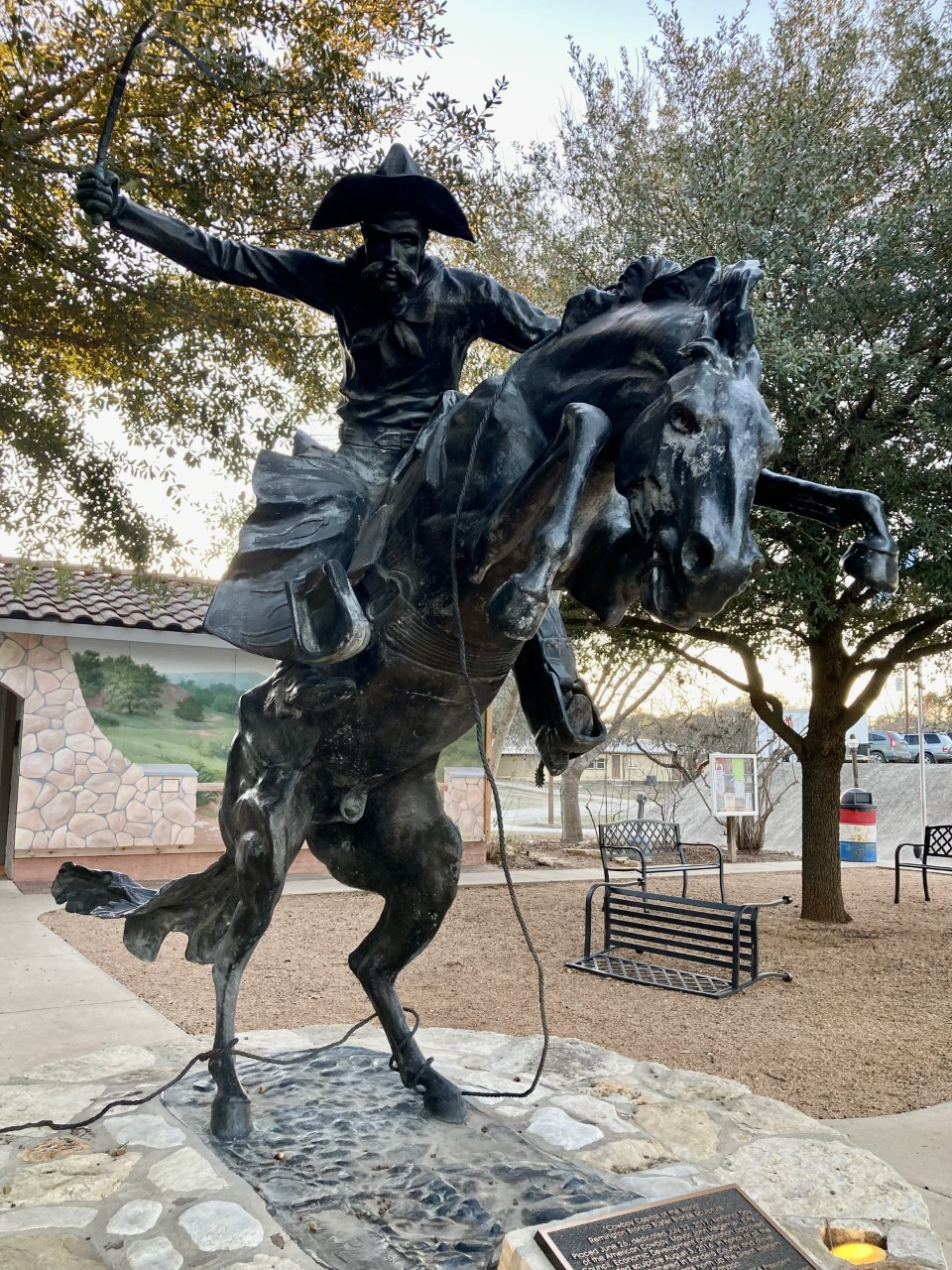
Cowboy statue

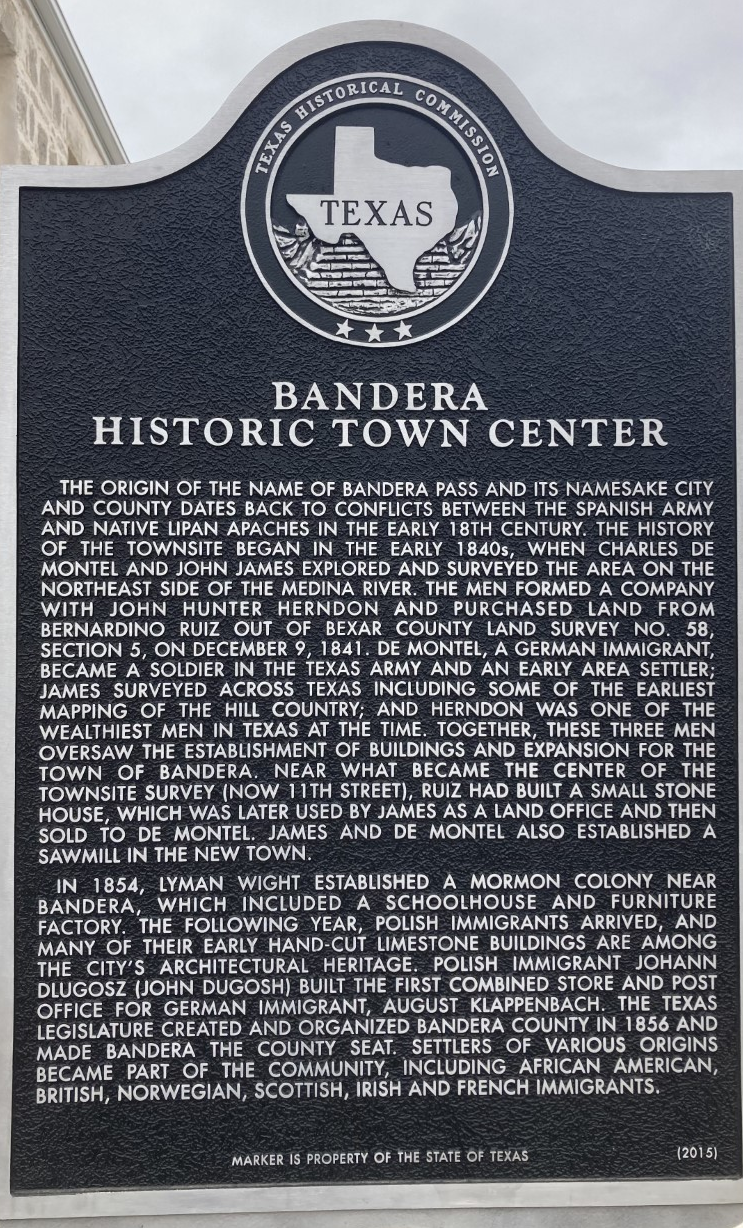
Historical marker for the town center
