= Sonia Sotomayor High School =

High school in San Antonio, Texas

Location
- 12801 Tall Timber Lane; San Antonio, Bexar County, Texas 78254; United States; 29.52794°N 98.74672°W

Information
- School type: Public, high school
- Founded: 2022
- School district: Northside Independent School District
- Superintendent: John M. Kraft
- NCES School ID: 483312013905
- Principal: Ada Bohlken
- Faculty: 134.17 (on an FTE basis)
- Grades: 9–12
- Enrollment: 2,383 (2023–2024)
- Student to teacher ratio: 17.76
- Colors: Black, silver, and white
- Athletics conference: UIL Class AAAAAA
- Mascot: Wildcats
- Newspaper: The Silver Paw
- Website: Sotomayor HS website

Sonia Sotomayor High School is a public high school in the Northside Independent School District (NISD) of San Antonio, Texas, United States. The school is named after Supreme Court justice, Sonia Sotomayor. She became the first woman of color, first Hispanic, and first Latina to be appointed to the Supreme Court in 2009. For the 2024–2025 school year, the school received an overall rating of "C" from the Texas Education Agency.

Sotomayor opened as the twelfth high school campus in the district on August 22, 2022. The high school is one of the most expensive and largest in NISD, costing the district $131.7 million dollars to build and spanning 75 acres. NISD announced in August 2021 that Sotomayor will open with no senior class, allowing all seniors previously zoned for William H. Taft High School, John Marshall Harlan High School, and Sandra Day O'Connor High School to finish their final year at their respective school.

== History ==
On August 26, 2022, the Sotomayor Wildcats kicked off their first ever American football appearance, and fought against the Legacy of Educational Excellence High School (L.E.E) Volunteers.

On November 15, 2024, the Wildcats made their first football playoff game appearance in school history, defeating the Winston Churchill Chargers 23–19.
