= Grey Forest, Texas =

- City
- Motto: A Scenic Playground
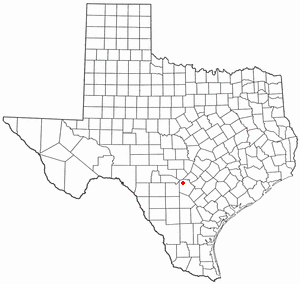
- Location of Grey Forest, Texas

- Coordinates: 29°37′1″N 98°41′5″W
- Country: United States
- State: Texas
- County: Bexar

Government
  - Mayor: Paul Garro

Area
  - Total: 0.71 sq mi (1.83 km^{2})
  - Land: 0.71 sq mi (1.83 km^{2})
  - Water: 0 sq mi (0.00 km^{2})
- Elevation: 1,142 ft (348 m)

Population (2020)
  - Total: 492
  - Density: 696/sq mi (269/km^{2})
- Time zone: UTC-6 (Central (CST))
  - Summer (DST): UTC-5 (CDT)
- ZIP code: 78023
- Area codes: 210, 726
- FIPS code: 48-31100
- GNIS feature ID: 1337019
- ANSI Code: 2410664
- Website: http://greyforest-tx.gov

Grey Forest is a city in northwestern Bexar County, Texas, United States. The population was 492 at the 2020 census. It is part of the San Antonio Metropolitan Statistical Area.

== History ==
Grey Forest was founded as camp and real estate development in the late 1920's. It incorporated in 1962.

== Geography ==
Grey Forest is located on Scenic Loop Road, approximately 17 miles northwest of Downtown San Antonio.

According to the United States Census Bureau, the city has a total area of 0.7 square miles (1.8 km^{2}), all land.

== Demographics ==
Historical population
Census	Pop.	Note	%±
1970	385		—
1980	442		14.8%
1990	425		−3.8%
2000	418		−1.6%
2010	483		15.6%
2020	492		1.9%
U.S. Decennial Census

As of the 2020 census, Grey Forest had a population of 492.

=== 2020 census ===
As of the 2020 census, the median age was 54.2 years; 14.8% of residents were under the age of 18 and 27.6% of residents were 65 years of age or older. For every 100 females there were 88.5 males, and for every 100 females age 18 and over there were 88.7 males age 18 and over.

Racial composition as of the 2020 census
Race	Number	Percent
White	387	78.7%
Black or African American	4	0.8%
American Indian and Alaska Native	3	0.6%
Asian	6	1.2%
Native Hawaiian and Other Pacific Islander	1	0.2%
Some other race	9	1.8%
Two or more races	82	16.7%
Hispanic or Latino (of any race)	98	19.9%

As of the 2020 census, 0.0% of residents lived in urban areas, while 100.0% lived in rural areas. As of the 2020 census, there were 219 households in Grey Forest, of which 31.1% had children under the age of 18 living in them. Of all households, 52.5% were married-couple households, 16.0% were households with a male householder and no spouse or partner present, and 22.8% were households with a female householder and no spouse or partner present. About 22.8% of all households were made up of individuals and 14.6% had someone living alone who was 65 years of age or older. As of the 2020 census, there were 235 housing units, of which 6.8% were vacant. The homeowner vacancy rate was 0.0% and the rental vacancy rate was 13.2%.

=== 2000 census ===
As of the census of 2000, there were 418 people, 179 households, and 127 families residing in the city. The population density was 565.9 inhabitants per square mile (218.5/km^{2}). There were 211 housing units at an average density of 285.6 per square mile (110.3/km^{2}). The racial makeup of the city was 98.80% White, 0.24% Native American, 0.72% from other races, and 0.24% from two or more races. Hispanic or Latino of any race were 7.66% of the population.

There were 179 households, out of which 28.5% had children under the age of 18 living with them, 59.2% were married couples living together, 8.9% had a female householder with no husband present, and 28.5% were non-families. 22.3% of all households were made up of individuals, and 6.1% had someone living alone who was 65 years of age or older. The average household size was 2.34 and the average family size was 2.75.

In the city, the population was spread out, with 19.9% under the age of 18, 5.7% from 18 to 24, 26.3% from 25 to 44, 33.5% from 45 to 64, and 14.6% who were 65 years of age or older. The median age was 44 years. For every 100 females, there were 95.3 males. For every 100 females age 18 and over, there were 91.4 males.

The median income for a household in the city was $47,614, and the median income for a family was $51,875. Males had a median income of $37,188 versus $29,464 for females. The per capita income for the city was $26,475. About 0.7% of families and 1.9% of the population were below the poverty line, including none of those under age 18 and 8.5% of those age 65 or over.

== Education ==
Residents are zoned to schools in the Northside Independent School District.

Students are zoned to:

- Helotes Elementary School (Helotes)
- Hector Garcia Middle School (San Antonio)
- Sandra Day O'Connor High School (Helotes)
