= John Jay High School (San Antonio) =

Location
- 7611 Marbach Road; San Antonio, Bexar County, Texas 78227; United States; 29.418348°N 98.63946°W

Information
- School type: Public, high school
- Established: 1967
- School district: Northside ISD
- NCES School ID: 483312003706
- Principal: Teresa Cuellar-Hernandez
- Teaching staff: 149.47
- Grades: 9–12
- Enrollment: 2,102 (2023–2024)
- Student to teacher ratio: 14.06
- Colors: Blue, silver, and white
- Athletics conference: UIL Class AAAAA
- Mascot: Mustangs
- Sports District: 28–6A
- Feeder Middle Schools: Anson Jones; E.M. Pease; Sam Rayburn
- Feeder Elementary Schools: Cable; Fisher; John Glenn; Lackland City; Mary Hull; Meadow Village; Michael; Passmore; Valley Hi; Westwood Terrace
- Website: Official Website

John Jay High School is a public high school in the Northside Independent School District of San Antonio, Texas and classified as a 5A school by the University Interscholastic League. During 2022–2023, Jay High School had an enrollment of 2,248 students and a student to teacher ratio of 14.41. The school received an overall rating of "D" from the Texas Education Agency for the 2024–2025 school year.

== History ==
All high schools in the Northside Independent School District (NISD) are named for US Supreme Court Justices, and the first Supreme Court Chief Justice was John Jay. John Jay High also contains a magnet school, the John Jay Science and Engineering Academy.

=== Student Locator Project ===
On October 1, 2012, the high school and Anson Jones Middle School began the controversial "Student Locator Project." Students were required to wear school IDs embedded with RFID microchips at all times. Student Andrea Hernandez was suspended from the school for refusing to wear the badge for religious reasons, linking it to the "mark of the beast" in the biblical book of Revelation. The Rutherford Institute filed a suit on behalf of Hernandez, and on November 21, 2012, a judge tentatively blocked the suspension. Hernandez was expelled from the school in January 2013. In July 2013, she was allowed to re-enter the school, which had abandoned the RFID project.

== Athletics ==
The Jay Mustangs compete in these sports:

- Baseball
- Basketball
- Cross country
- American Football
- Golf
- Football
- Softball
- Swimming and diving
- Tennis
- Track and field
- Volleyball
- FIRST Robotics Competition

=== Championships ===
- 2002 5A State Champions in Boys' Basketball
- 1991 5A State Champions in Girls' Volleyball

=== 2015 football incident ===
On September 4, 2015, the athletic program attracted national attention after a game in which two players, identified as Victor Rojas and Michael Moreno, drove into the back of umpire Robert Watts during the final moments of the event. Rojas was ejected from the game and both were suspended from the team the next day. The two players were later suspended from school and an assistant coach, Mack Breed, who may have provoked the incident, was also suspended. The incident made national news. Breed admitted to ordering the hit, although he later recanted the statement. He resigned that same month. He later pleaded guilty to misdemeanor assault. Part of his sentencing included permanently surrendering his teaching license.

== Notable alumni ==
- Scott Ankrom (Class of 1984) — Former NFL wide receiver. Played one season for the Dallas Cowboys.
- Maya Rockeymoore Cummings, political consultant
- Clarissa Davis (Class of 1985) — Former NCAA basketball All-American and two-time Naismith National Player of the Year. Olympic and women's professional basketball standout. Inducted into The Women's Basketball Hall of Fame in 2006.
- Derrick Hatchett (Class of 1975) — Former NFL player
- Wallace B. Jefferson (Class of 1981) — Former Chief Justice, and first African American justice on the Supreme Court of Texas, 2004–2013.
- Gina Ortiz Jones Iraq war veteran and mayor of San Antonio since 2025.
- Thomas Lott (Class of 1974) — Former NFL player
- Mickey Mahler (Class of 1970) — Former Major League pitcher. Played six seasons for three teams.
- Rick Mahler (Class of 1971) — Former Major League pitcher. Played thirteen seasons for four teams, primarily the Atlanta Braves.
- Sammy Morris (Class of 1995) — Former NFL running back. Played 12 seasons for four teams.
- Bo Outlaw (Class of 1989) — Former NBA basketball player. Played 15 seasons for five teams.
- Reuben Reina (Class of 1986) The most accomplished distance runner in Texas high school history. Former Olympian in the 1992 Olympics in Barcelona. Inducted into both the University of Arkansas Sports Hall of Fame and the San Antonio Sports Hall of Fame.
- Josh Reynolds (Class of 2013) — Current NFL wide receiver for the Detroit Lions
- Chris Ross (Class of 2003) — Current professional basketball player in the Philippine Basketball Association. As a junior, sank a 50-foot half-court buzzer-beater to give Jay the 2002 Class 5A state basketball championship.
- Yolanda Saldívar — Convicted murderer of Latin music superstar Selena, and currently serving a life sentence in the Texas Department of Criminal Justice. Saldivar attended, but did not graduate from Jay.
- Demetria Sance (Class of 1995) — Former Olympic volleyball player
- Billy Smith (Class of 1971) — Former MLB Player
- Billy Taylor (Class of 1973) — Former NFL player
- Scott Thomas (Class of 1982) — Former All-American college football player (defensive back) at the Air Force Academy; elected to the College Football Hall of Fame in 2012. Awarded the Distinguished Flying Cross as a USAF F-16 combat pilot in Desert Storm.
- Jacob Zeno (Class of 2019) — College football quarterback for the Baylor Bears and the UAB Blazers
