= Tony Crocker =

American basketball player (born 1987)

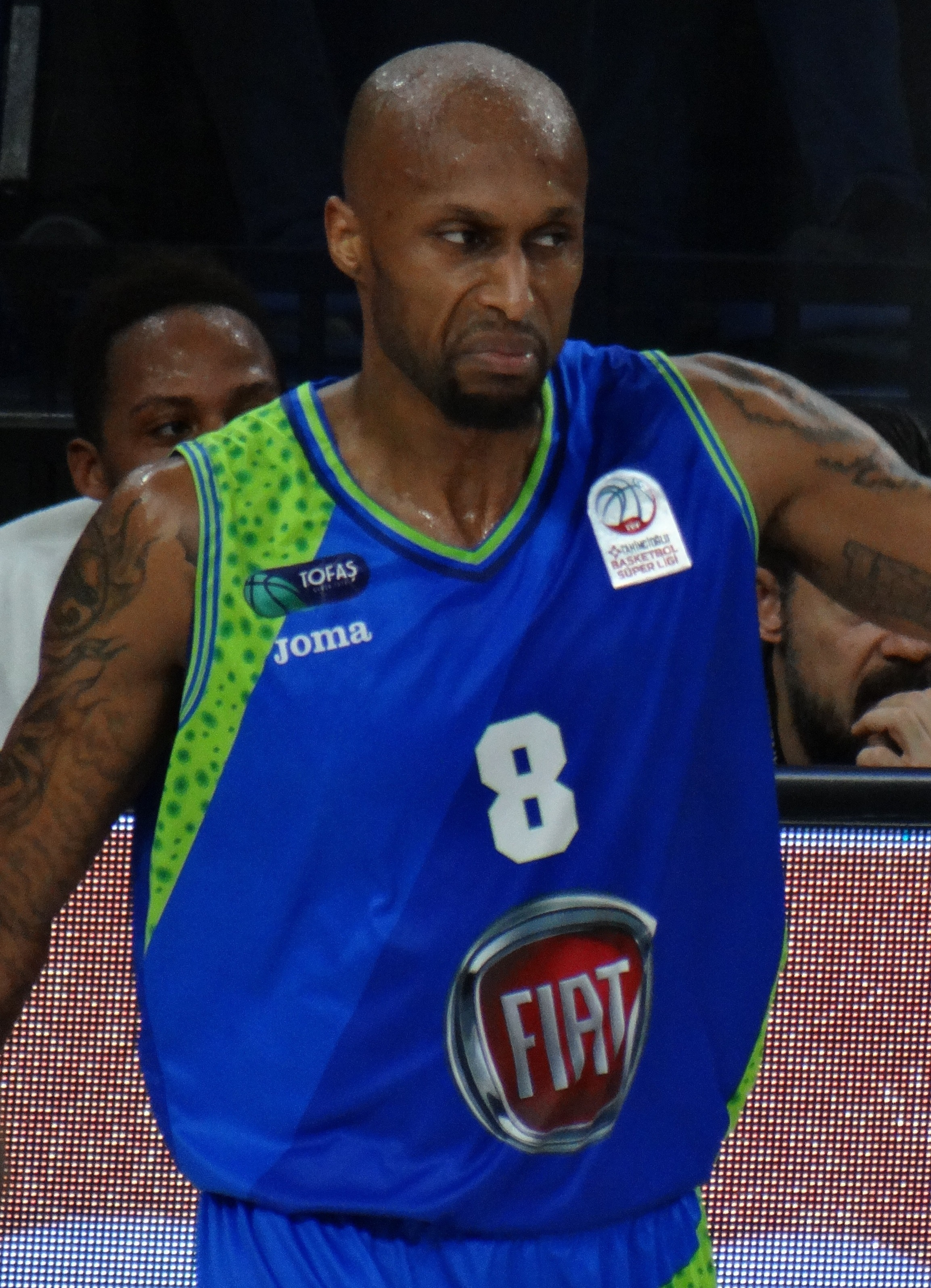
- Crocker with Tofaş in 2018

Personal information
- Born: January 17, 1987 (age 39) Lawton, Oklahoma, U.S.
- Listed height: 6 ft 6 in (1.98 m)
- Listed weight: 216 lb (98 kg)

Career information
- High school: William H. Taft (San Antonio, Texas); Earl Warren (San Antonio, Texas); The Patterson School (Lenoir, North Carolina)
- College: Oklahoma (2006–2010)
- NBA draft: 2010: undrafted
- Playing career: 2010–2022
- Position: Shooting guard / small forward

Career history
- 2010–2011: Albacomp
- 2011–2012: KTP
- 2012–2013: Keravnos
- 2013–2014: Nea Kifissia
- 2014–2015: Hapoel Holon
- 2015–2016: Yeşilgiresun Belediye
- 2016–2018: Tofaş
- 2018–2019: Khimki
- 2019–2020: Pınar Karşıyaka
- 2020–2021: Adelaide 36ers
- 2021: SIG Strasbourg
- 2021–2022: Metropolitans 92

Career highlights
- TBL All-Star (2016); Hungarian All-Star MVP (2011); Hungarian All-Star Slam Dunk Champion (2011)

Antonio Lamar Crocker (born January 17, 1987) is an American former professional basketball player. He played college basketball for the Oklahoma Sooners. Crocker has had significant stints in Europe and Turkey.

A native of Lawton, Oklahoma, he excelled at basketball while attending Earl Warren High School in San Antonio, Texas before attending prep school at The Patterson School.

== High school career ==
Crocker attended Earl Warren High School in San Antonio, Texas, his final three years of high school after attending William Howard Taft High School as a freshman. While attending Warren High he was a 2005 Texas Association of Basketball Coaches First-Team 5A All-State selection and named the 2005 San Antonio Player of the Year by the San Antonio Express-News in his senior season. He averaged 22.0 points, 10.0 rebounds and 4.0 assists per game as a senior and scored a career-high 44 points against Bowie High School his senior season. He earned all-city and all-district honors as a junior and recorded a triple-double as a junior against James Madison High School (21 points, 14 rebounds, 11 assists). He was coached by Jay Keller at Warren HS and by Mike Carillo at Taft HS.

Crocker played prep school basketball after his senior year at Warren High. He spent the majority of his prep school career battling an ankle injury, but finished the season averaging 15.2 points, 5.0 rebounds and 3.0 assists per game for The Patterson School in Lenoir, North Carolina. Coming out of prep school he was rated as the No. 80 overall player in the class of 2006 by Rivals.com and ranked as the country's 18th-best shooting guard by Rivals and Scout.com. He was also rated as the 25th-best post-graduate prep school player in the country by HoopScoopOnline.com. At Patterson School he helped his team to a 34–3 record and a No. 3 national prep school ranking despite being limited to 10 games due to injury. At The Patterson School he was coached by Chris Chaney.

== College career ==
Crocker signed a letter of intent to play college basketball at the University of Oklahoma under Kelvin Sampson, and stuck to his commitment when coach Sampson left to Indiana University and coach Jeff Capel III became the new coach of the Sooners.

Crocker burst onto the scene at the University of Oklahoma, where he was named to the starting lineup in his first collegiate game under Capel. Crocker started 25 out of 31 games as a true freshman at Oklahoma and established himself as one of the top freshmen in the country. He ended his debut season at Oklahoma averaging 8.6 points and 3.7 rebounds per game.

== Professional career ==
Crocker played for the Houston Rockets in the NBA Summer League in 2010. In 2010, he signed with Albacomp in Hungary.

On June 11, 2016, Crocker signed with Yeşilgiresun Belediye of the Turkish BSL for the 2015–16 season.

On July 30, 2016, Crocker signed with Jilin Northeast Tigers of the Chinese Basketball Association. However, he left the club before appearing in a game for them, and on October 20, 2016, he signed with Turkish club Tofaş.

On August 8, 2018, Crocker signed a one-year deal with Russian club BC Khimki.

On July 19, 2019, he signed a two-year contract with Pınar Karşıyaka of the Turkish Basketbol Süper Ligi.

On December 1, 2020, Crocker signed a one-year contract with the Adelaide 36ers of the Australian National Basketball League (NBL). He averaged 10.8 points, 2.8 rebounds, and 1.3 assists per game.

On October 7, 2021, Crocker signed with SIG Strasbourg of the LNB Pro A to replace injured Jarrell Eddie.

On December 14, 2021, Crocker signed a three-month deal with Metropolitans 92 of the LNB Pro A, to replace the injured Jordan McRae.
