= John Marshall Harlan High School =

John Marshall Harlan High School may refer to:

- Harlan Community Academy High School - Chicago
- John Marshall Harlan High School - Unincorporated Bexar County, Texas, near San Antonio

== See also ==
- Harlan County High School, Rosspoint, Kentucky
