= Oliver Wendell Holmes High School =

Location
- 6500 Ingram Rd. San Antonio, Bexar County, Texas 78238; United States; 29.46546°N 98.617371°W

Information
- School type: Public, high school
- Established: 1964
- School district: Northside ISD
- NCES School ID: 483312003701
- Principal: Cynthia Barrera
- Teaching staff: 159.44 (on an FTE basis)
- Grades: 9–12
- Enrollment: 2,568 (2023–2024)
- Student to teacher ratio: 16.11
- Colors: Forest Green and Gold
- Athletics conference: UIL AAAAAA
- Mascot: Huskies
- Maximum Capacity: 3,000
- Sports District: 28–6A
- Magnet schools: Northside School of Innovation, Technology, and Entrepreneurship
- Website: Official Website

Oliver Wendell Holmes High School is a public high school that is part of the Northside Independent School District in San Antonio, Texas. It is the parent school for the magnet school Northside School of Innovation, Technology, and Entrepreneurship. During 2022–2023, Holmes High School had an enrollment of 2,561 students and a student to teacher ratio of 15.79. The school received an overall rating of "D" from the Texas Education Agency for the 2024–2025 school year.

== Campus ==
Holmes High School was established in 1964 and is known for its circular architecture, in which several buildings are completely cylindrical. As with all Northside ISD schools, Holmes is named for a former or current United States Supreme Court justice, in this case Oliver Wendell Holmes Jr.

== Areas served by the school ==
Holmes High School serves a little more than 2,000 students in grades 9-12 from neighborhoods and subdivisions along the IH-410 Loop corridor. An additional 800-850 students (grade levels 9–12) are served by Business Careers High School, the "sister" magnet school of Holmes. The students at Business Careers count as part of Holmes, making the student population of Holmes almost 2,900.

During the 2006–2007 year, the Northside Board of Trustees changed the attendance zones of Earl Warren High School and Holmes, moving several neighborhoods from the Warren attendance zone to the Holmes attendance zone, to go into effect in 2007–2008. This added approximately 300 students to the school.

== Programs offered ==
Holmes offers athletic programs sanctioned by the University Interscholastic League.

Holmes also offers most of the Academic UIL events, including Social Studies, Science, Current Issues, One Act Play, Computer Science, Band, Computer Applications, Calculator Applications, Literary Criticism, various speaking competitive events, and various journalistic competitive events, AFJROTC drill teams and core/unit. Business Careers students compete as part of the Holmes teams. The school has a dual credit college program in conjunction with Northwest Vista College where eligible students earn both high school and college credit for the same course.

In the 2007–2008 school year, The Husky Band received a Division 1 at UIL during marching season for their performance "Sketches of Spain. The Husky Band received a Division 1 at UIL during the 2009-10 marching season for "The Quest." During 2015-2016 they won their 5th straight 1st division with the program called "Genesis – A Simple Gift to Life." This was preceded by the band reaching the UIL state competition in 1999 under the direction of Dr. Abel Ramirez, as well as winning the 'Drums along the Medina' competition in that same year.

Members of the Holmes fine-arts programs have also been selected to participate in the Texas Music Educators Association's (TMEA) All-State ensembles. All-State is the highest honor a Texas high school music student can receive. These musicians are commonly referred to as, “The best of the best”. According to the TMEA website, 1,830 students are selected through a process that begins with over 70,000 students from around the state vying for the honor to perform in one of 18 ensembles sponsored by the Band, Orchestra, and Vocal Divisions. A total of 56 individuals have been selected from Holmes by TMEA to perform in the aforementioned ensembles. The first Holmes All-State musician was Danny Armstrong (Percussion) in 1970 and, most recently, Ian Morrison (Flute) of the attached magnet school Business Careers High School in 2013 and 2014.

=== Academic Decathlon ===
In 1994, the Holmes Academic Decathlon won its first State Championship, defeating perennial state championship power J. J. Pearce High School from Richardson, Texas. Holmes then advanced to the 1994 United States Academic Decathlon National competition, finishing third overall, behind William Howard Taft High School of Woodland Hills, California and Mountain View High School of Mesa, Arizona. Varsity student Diana Johnston, who was part of the Holmes Academic Decathlon team which won the State Championship in 1994 as stated above, would later go on to coach the Northside Health Careers High School Academic Decathlon team beginning the 2018–2019 school year. In the 2020–2021 school year, Dr. Diana Johnston led the HCHS Academic Decathlon Team to Nationals, where they won 1st place in the Medium School Online Division (the first Texas team to ever place in the online competition), 4th overall in competition, and other accolades.

== Athletics ==
The Holmes Huskies compete in these sports:

- Baseball
- Basketball
- Cross Country
- Football
- Golf
- Soccer
- Softball
- Swimming and Diving
- Tennis
- Track and Field
- Volleyball

== Notable alumni ==
- Keith Cash (Class of 1987) — Former professional American football tight end in the NFL. Played for the Pittsburgh Steelers and Kansas City Chiefs.
- Kerry Cash (Class of 1987) — Former professional American football tight end in the NFL. Played for the Indianapolis Colts, Chicago Bears, and Oakland Raiders.
- John Cornyn (Class of 1970) — Senior United States senator for Texas, serving since 2002.
- Steve Earle (Class of 1973) — Three-time Grammy award-winning American musician, best known for his 1986 country music album, "Guitar Town", (#1 Billboard Country Charts).
- Trey Martinez Fischer (Class of 1988) — Minority Leader of the Texas House of Representatives since 2023, and Democratic member of the Texas House of Representatives serving the San Antonio-based 116th District from 2000 to 2017, and since 2019.
- Cedric Griffin (Class of 2001) — Former professional American football defensive back in the NFL. Played for the Washington Redskins and Minnesota Vikings.
- Jennifer Gutierrez (Class of 1985) — Women's Triathlete, 2000 Summer Olympics
- Anjanette Kirkland (Class of 1992) — Women's Track & Field, Gold Medalist, 2001 World Championships in Athletics, 100-meter Hurdles; Gold Medalist, 2001 IAAF World Indoor Championships, 60-meter Hurdles
- Brandon Larson (Class of 1994) — Former professional baseball player in MLB for the Cincinnati Reds. College World Series MVP for 1997 National Champions, LSU.
- Dan Morales (Class of 1974) — American politician. Served as the 48th Attorney General of Texas from January 15, 1991, through January 13, 1999, during the administrations of Governors Ann Richards and George W. Bush.
- Michael Morales (musician) (Class of 1981) — Grammy award-winning American musician, producer, and sound engineer, most known for the Top 40-charting song, "Who Do You Give Your Love To?", (#15 Billboard Hot 100).
- Robert Quiroga (Class of 2000) — Former American football wide receiver who played eight seasons in the Arena Football League and one season in the Canadian Football League.

== Northside School of Innovation, Technology, and Entrepreneurship ==
Northside School of Innovation, Technology, and Entrepreneurship is a business and technology "school within a school" located on the campus of Oliver Wendell Holmes High School. Formerly known as the Business Careers High School, it is a business and technology magnet high school part of the Northside Independent School District in San Antonio, Texas.

The school was founded in 1991. Sometime between 2020 & 2022 the school changed its name from "Business Careers High School" to "Northside School of Innovation, Technology, and Entrepreneurship". (Note: The aricle listed below is written about the 2020 graduates of the school & refers to the school as Business Careers High School, Currently the School is NSITE. https://www.ksat.com/features/2020/04/20/nsite-high-school-great-graduates-2020/#/rounds/1/greatgraduates?isEditing=false) In February 2022 students from NSITE competed in the Global Business Summit.

Notable alumni include Darold Williamson (class of 2001; men's track and field gold medalist and anchor leg, 2004 Summer Olympics, 1,600-meter relay).
