= Helotes, Texas =

- City
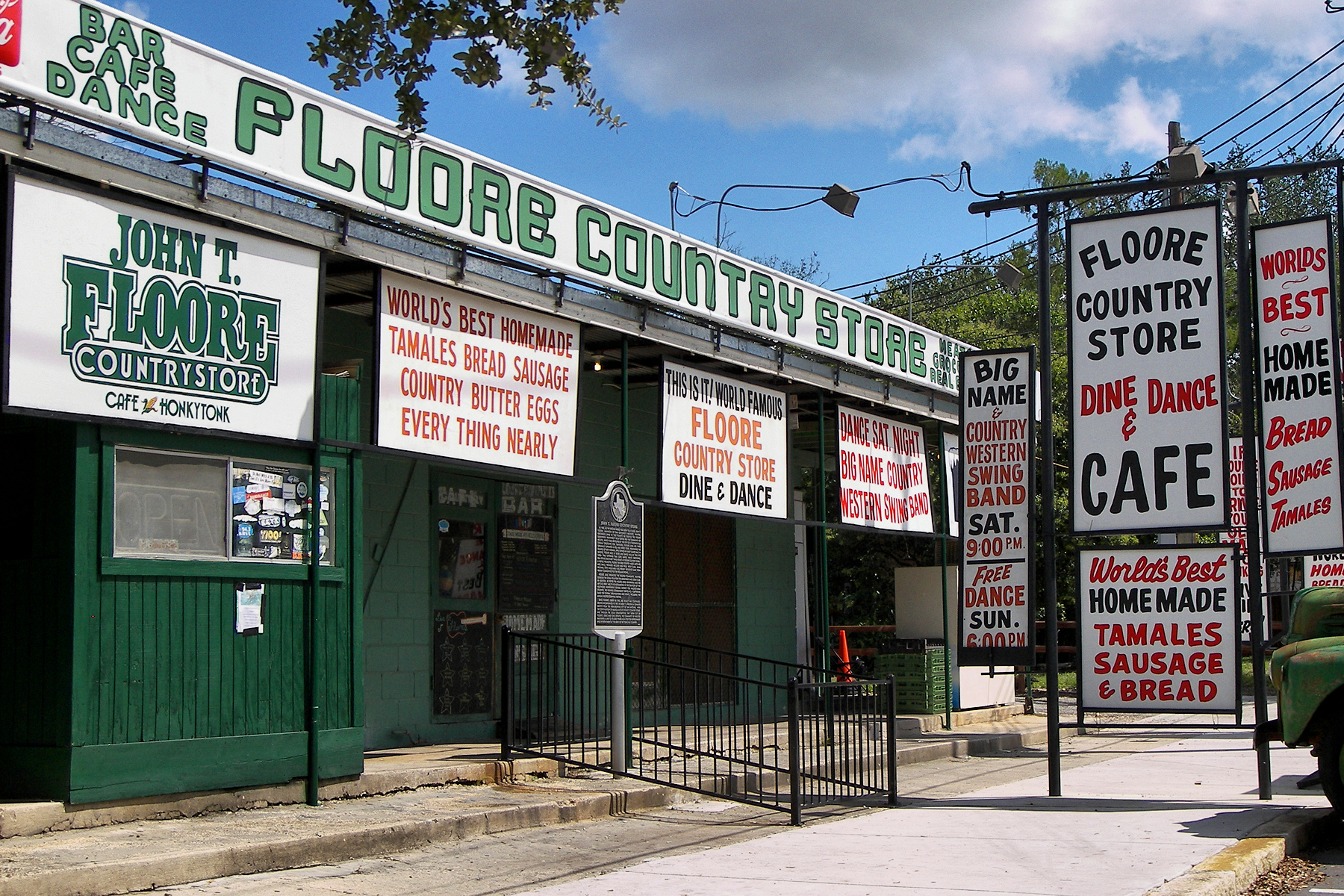
- The historic Floore Country Store in Helotes

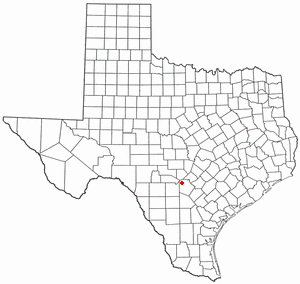
- Location of Helotes, Texas

- Coordinates: 29°33′55″N 98°41′21″W
- Country: United States
- State: Texas
- County: Bexar

Government
  - Mayor: Rich Whitehead

Area
  - Total: 6.93 sq mi (17.96 km^{2})
  - Land: 6.93 sq mi (17.95 km^{2})
  - Water: 0.0039 sq mi (0.01 km^{2})
- Elevation: 1,037 ft (316 m)

Population (2020)
  - Total: 9,030
  - Density: 1,437.5/sq mi (555.04/km^{2})
- Time zone: UTC−6 (Central (CST))
  - Summer (DST): UTC−5 (CDT)
- ZIP Code: 78023
- Area codes: 210, 726
- FIPS code: 48-33146
- GNIS feature ID: 1337583
- ANSI Code: 2410736
- Website: www.helotes-tx.gov

Helotes (/həˈloʊtɪs/ hə-LOH-tis) is a city in Bexar County, Texas, United States, located on the far northwestern side of San Antonio. It is part of the San Antonio-New Braunfels metropolitan statistical area. Helotes was settled primarily by German and Spanish settlers in the 1850s. Its population was 9,030 at the 2020 census.

== History ==
According to anthropologists, the area was occupied seasonally from about 5,000 BCE by small bands of nomadic Native American tribes in search of food and game. The Lipan Apache moved into the area in the late 17th century and occupied it throughout the 18th century. However, the Lipan were forced from the area in the early 1820s by the Comanche Indians.

A small farming and ranching community began to develop in the area shortly after the Texas Revolution in the late 1830s. The ranches suffered occasional attacks by the Comanches until the early to mid 1870s. The last Indian raid in the Helotes area was in 1872, when Modesto Torres attacked an encampment of Comanche Indians who killed a settler at the Krempkau divide, where today Babcock and Scenic Loop roads intercept.

In 1858, a Scottish immigrant, Dr. George Marnoch, purchased the land that later became the site of the town. Marnoch's home at one time served as a stagecoach stop and a post office for cowboys driving their cattle from Bandera to auction in San Antonio. His heirs sold a portion of their property in 1880 to a Swiss immigrant, Arnold Gugger, who built a home and mercantile store around which the town of Helotes arose. In 1908, Gugger sold his property to Bert Hileman, who opened the town's first dance hall. He was also instrumental in getting old Bandera Road paved and opening the town's first filling station. He sold his property in downtown Helotes in 1919, when the town's population declined.

In 1946, the manager of San Antonio's Majestic Theatre, John T. Floore, opened the landmark John T. Floore Country Store, which is actually a dance hall (or "honky tonk") that draws top country music talent, including Willie Nelson, who still plays the venue on occasion. Floore also financed the first annual Helotes Cornyval festival in the 1960s, which was held to celebrate the opening of a new post office.

Corn played an important role in the heritage of Helotes. The local Native Americans planted corn (maize outside the US) in the fertile valleys of the area, and feed corn was a major crop grown in the 19th and early 20th centuries. The town name is derived from the Spanish word elote, which can mean "ear of maize", "corncob", or simply "corn", but exactly how the town came to be called Helotes is still a subject of debate.

The urban sprawl of San Antonio expanded and approached the outskirts of Helotes in the 1970s. After a decade of planning and negotiation, Helotes became an incorporated city in October 1981. To this day, residents struggle with the dilemma of maintaining the city's rugged country charm, while at the same time allowing for the development of modern suburban facilities and businesses. Helotes was the hometown of late Texas State Senator Frank L. Madla, who died after his home on the south side of San Antonio caught fire on November 24, 2006.

=== 1953 tornado ===
On April 28, 1953, a violent 1-mile-wide (1.6 km) F4 tornado struck the city, damaging or destroying multiple structures. Two people were killed and 15 others were injured.

== Overview ==
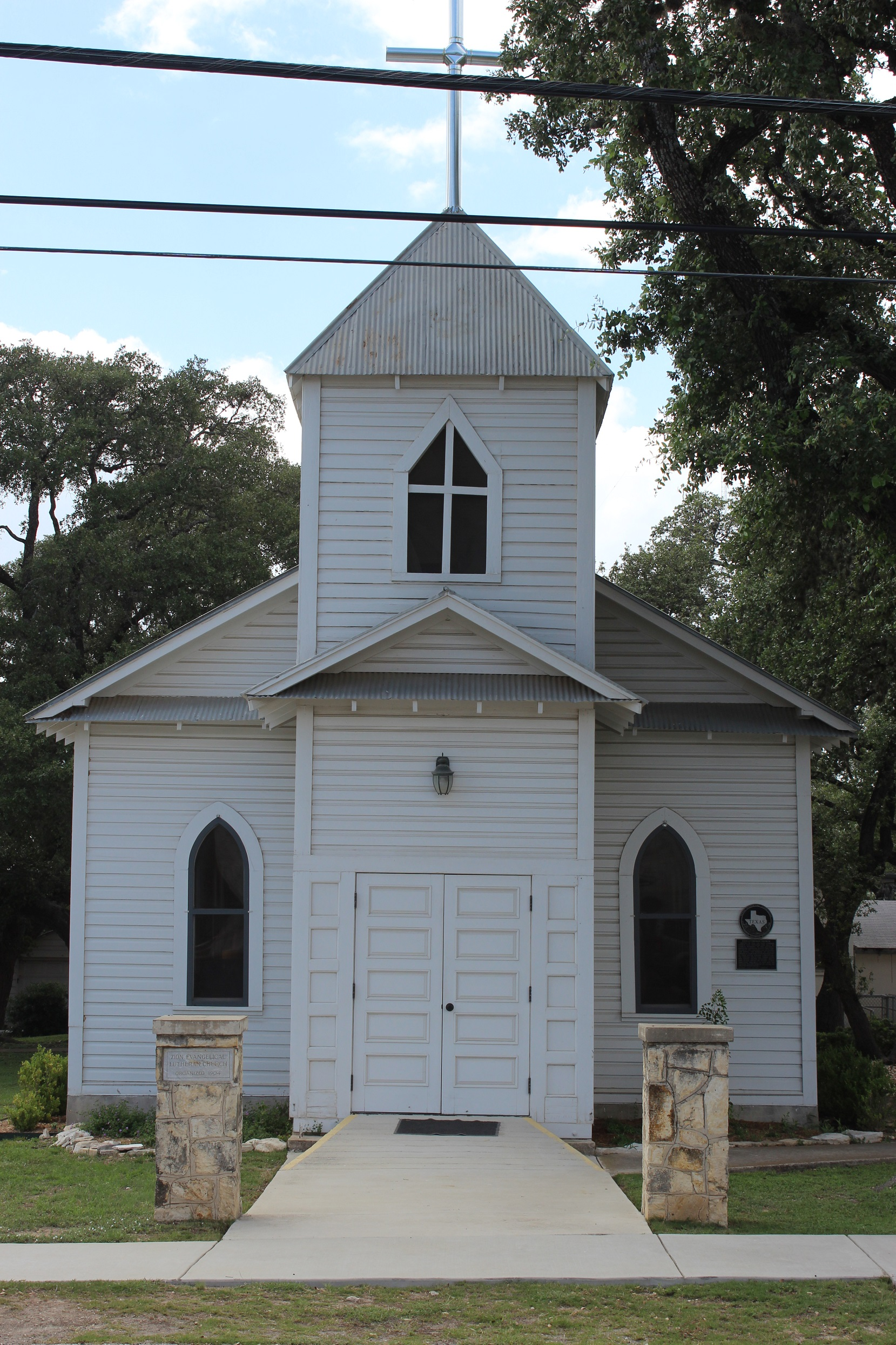
Helotes' historic Zion Lutheran Church

When Helotes incorporated in 1981, very little was in the town. Now with a population over 7,000, Helotes is becoming one of the most desirable suburbs of San Antonio. Helotes itself includes the newly renovated Old Town Helotes. Completed in 2011, Old Town Helotes is the revitalized downtown. Helotes is home to Oak Valley golf course.

The Cornyval Festival is an annual city tradition bringing in local vendors and thousands of area residents to celebrate the namesake of the town.

== Geography ==
Helotes is located in northwestern Bexar County in the valley of Helotes Creek where it exits from the Texas Hill Country. The city is about 20 miles (32 km) northwest of downtown San Antonio. Texas State Highway 16 runs through the community, leading northwest 30 mi (48 km) to Bandera. The Charles W. Anderson Loop, the outer beltway around San Antonio, is 2 mi (3 km) southeast of the center of Helotes.

According to the United States Census Bureau, Helotes has a total area of 6.6 sq mi (17.0 km^{2}), of which 0.004 sq mi (0.01 km^{2}), or about 2.5 acres, 0.06%, is covered by water.

== Climate ==
Helotes features a subtropical climate. The summers are muggy and hot and the winter is short, windy and cold. Over a course of a year the temperatures can be as low as 41°F and as high as 95°F. August is the hottest month in Helotes, with an average high of 94°F. January is the coldest month with temperatures with an average at 42°F. Skies are the clearest in June and the cloudiest in January. Precipitation is the highest in may with an average of 3.6 in, and the lowest in February, with an average of 1.5 in. In July Muggy conditions are very common while in January they are the least common.

== Events ==
Helotes is very well known for the Cornyval festival that happens every late April through early May. Cornyval happens on the fairgrounds right off of Leslie road in front of O'Connor High School.

== Demographics ==
Historical population
Census	Pop.	Note	%±
1990	1,535		—
2000	4,285		179.2%
2010	7,341		71.3%
2020	9,030		23.0%
U.S. Decennial Census

As of the 2020 census, Helotes had a population of 9,030 and a median age of 43.4 years.

=== Racial and ethnic composition ===
Helotes racial composition as of the 2020 census (Note: Note: the US Census treats Hispanic/Latino as an ethnic category. This table excludes Latinos from the racial categories and assigns them to a separate category. Hispanics/Latinos can be of any race.)
Race	Number	Percent
White	5,317	58.9%
Black or African American	303	3.4%
American Indian and Alaska Native	66	0.7%
Asian	412	4.6%
Native Hawaiian and Other Pacific Islander	6	0.1%
Some other race	609	6.7%
Two or more races	2,317	25.7%
Hispanic or Latino (of any race)	3,653	40.5%

=== 2020 census ===
22.9% of residents were under the age of 18 and 16.5% were 65 years of age or older. For every 100 females there were 96.4 males, and for every 100 females age 18 and over there were 93.4 males age 18 and over.

99.7% of residents lived in urban areas, while 0.3% lived in rural areas.

There were 3,051 households in Helotes, of which 37.9% had children under the age of 18 living in them. Of all households, 71.9% were married-couple households, 9.2% were households with a male householder and no spouse or partner present, and 15.8% were households with a female householder and no spouse or partner present. About 12.7% of all households were made up of individuals and 6.5% had someone living alone who was 65 years of age or older. The average household size was 2.91 and the average family size was 3.13 persons.

There were 3,158 housing units, of which 3.4% were vacant. The homeowner vacancy rate was 1.3% and the rental vacancy rate was 3.2%.

The median income for a household in the city was $76,951, and for a family was $80,090. Males had a median income of $50,625 versus $38,362 for females. The per capita income for the city was $29,534. About 2.0% of families and 2.0% of the population were below the poverty line including 2.4% of those under 18 and 2.9% of those 65 or older.

== Education ==
Helotes residents are zoned to the following schools in the Northside Independent School District:

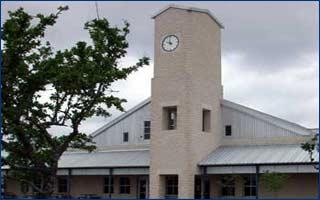
Sandra Day O'Connor High School

Elementary schools:

- Charles L. Kuentz, Jr. Elementary School (Helotes)
- Helotes Elementary School (Helotes)
- Los Reyes Elementary School (Helotes)
- Randall H. Fields Elementary School (San Antonio)

Middle schools:

- Dr. Hector P. Garcia Middle School (San Antonio)
- Wallace B. Jefferson Middle School (San Antonio)
- Dr. John Folks Middle School (Davis Ranch)

High schools:

- Sandra Day O'Connor High School (Helotes)
- Louis Dembitz Brandeis High School (San Antonio)
- John Marshall Harlan High School (San Antonio)

== Notable people ==
- Joe Castro, special effects artist and film director
- Phil Gramm, former US. Senator and US Congressman, Texas' 6th District
- Will Hurd, U.S. congressman
- Boone Logan, former MLB pitcher
- Brucene Smith, Miss World USA 1971 and Miss International 1974
- Carlos Uresti, attorney and Democratic politician from San Antonio, Texas
