= Darryl Morris (American football) =

American football player (born 1990)

Darryl Morris Jr.
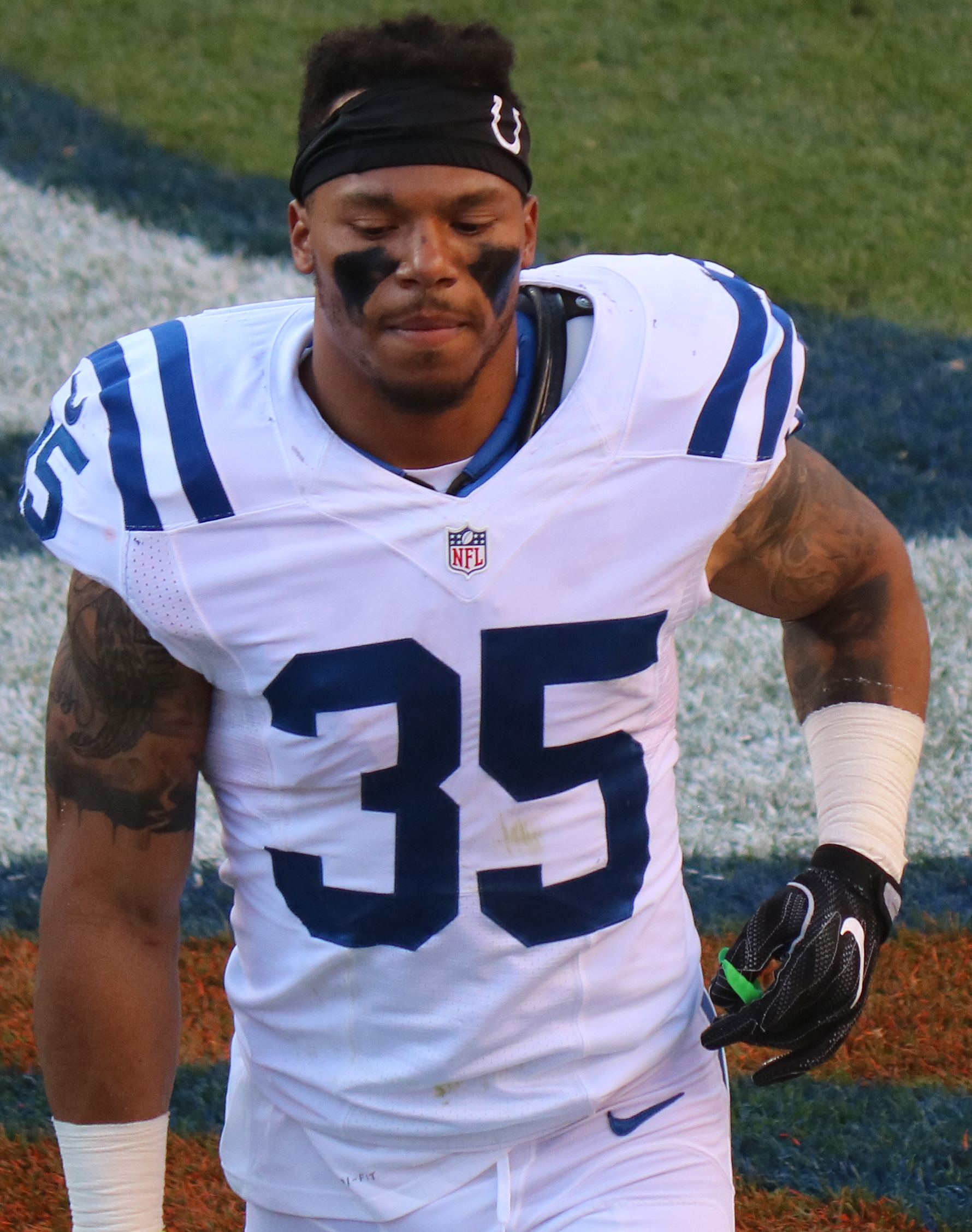
- Morris with the Indianapolis Colts in 2016

No. 40, 26, 21, 35, 23
- Position: Cornerback

Personal information
- Born: September 4, 1990 (age 36); San Antonio, Texas, U.S.
- Listed height: 5 ft 10 in (1.78 m)
- Listed weight: 188 lb (85 kg)

Career information
- High school: Warren (San Antonio)
- College: Texas State
- NFL draft: 2013: undrafted

Career history
- San Francisco 49ers (2013); Houston Texans (2014–2015); New York Jets (2016)*; Indianapolis Colts (2016–2017); New York Giants (2017); San Antonio Commanders (2019)
- * Offseason or practice squad member only

Career NFL statistics
- Total tackles: 98
- Pass deflections: 14
- Interceptions: 2
- Stats at Pro Football Reference

Darryl Eric Morris (born September 4, 1990) is an American former professional football player who was a cornerback in the National Football League (NFL). He played college football for the Texas State Bobcats. He was signed by the San Francisco 49ers as an undrafted free agent in 2013. He is currently an assistant district attorney in Dallas as of October 2023.

== Professional career ==
=== San Francisco 49ers ===
On May 2, 2013, he signed with the San Francisco 49ers as an undrafted free agent. On August 31, 2013, he was released. On September 3, 2013, he was signed to the practice squad. On September 24, 2013, he was promoted to the active roster from the practice squad.

=== Houston Texans ===
On August 31, 2014, Morris was claimed off waivers by the Houston Texans.

=== New York Jets ===
Morris signed with the New York Jets in March 2016. On September 3, 2016, he was released by the Jets as part of final roster cuts.

=== Indianapolis Colts ===
On September 5, 2016, Morris signed with the Colts. He was released by the Colts on October 19, 2016. He was re-signed by the Colts on November 23, 2016.

On August 21, 2017, Morris was placed on injured reserve. He was released on October 3, 2017.

=== New York Giants ===
On November 28, 2017, Morris signed with the New York Giants.

=== San Antonio Commanders ===
In December 2018, Morris signed with the San Antonio Commanders of the AAF. On January 30, 2019, Morris was waived/injured by the Commanders as part of the final training camp cuts, and subsequently placed on injured reserve after clearing waivers. The league ceased operations in April 2019.
