= Northside Health Careers High School =

Health careers magnet school in San Antonio

Health Careers High School

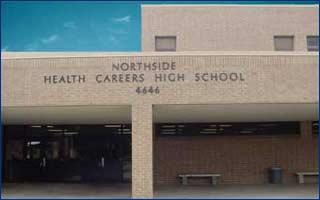

Location
- 4646 Hamilton Wolfe Road; San Antonio, Bexar County, Texas 78229; 29.520427°N 98.578972°W

Information
- School type: Public Secondary Magnet
- Established: 1984
- School district: Northside Independent School District
- Superintendent: John Craft
- School number: (210) 397-5400
- Principal: Brad Hebert
- Grades: 9–12
- Enrollment: 896 (2022–23)
- Colors: Blue, White, Maroon
- Mascot: Phoenix
- Website: www.nisd.net/healthcareers

Northside Health Careers High School (HCHS) is a magnet school in San Antonio's Northside Independent School District for students who are interested in pursuing a career in the health professions. HCHS attracts students from school districts all across Bexar County and some from as far as Hondo, Texas. For the 2024-2025 school year, the school received an overall rating of "A" from the Texas Education Agency.

== History ==
HCHS opened in 1984 as one of the first magnet schools in south Texas under principal John Boyers, who remained principal until 2002. The land on which the school sits was donated to Northside Independent School District by the San Antonio Medical Foundation. HCHS is in the heart of San Antonio's Southwest Medical Center.

== Admissions ==
HCHS is unique from other Bexar County magnet schools in that it operates as an independent campus rather than as part of a "parent" school (See Business Careers High School or Communications Arts High School). Admission to HCHS requires the submission of an application and essay, as well as a C average. Eligible applicants are entered into a lottery system with selected students notified by mail. Prior to admitting the class of 2001, the admissions process did not operate as a lottery, and admitted students were selected based on the merits of their application. Each year, over 800 students apply to fill only 250 spots. As a public school, no tuition is charged to either in-district or out of district students.

== Academics ==
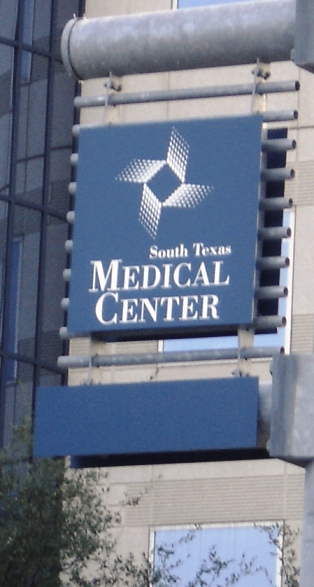
Sign depicting the location of the South Texas Medical Center

HCHS educates about 900 students from the 9th grade through the 12th grade. The curriculum of HCHS complies with the requirements of the Texas Education Agency, but additional courses that relate to the health field are also offered.

Health Careers is a magnet high school that prepares students for careers in the medical field. Its academic programs emphasize the practical application of medical knowledge and skills through coursework designed to support students' educational and career development.

Students attending HCHS must take mandatory medical CTE courses in addition to their core curriculum courses. Freshmen must take Medical Terminology and Principles of Health Science, while sophomores must take Anatomy & Physiology and Health Science Theory.

Upon successful completion of a student’s sophomore year, they may choose from six strands of career and technical education (CTE). Upperclassmen will take specialized CTE courses in their strand for the remainder of their high school years. The following CTE strands currently offered at HCHS include:

- Clinical Laboratory
- Clinical Medical Assisting
- Dental
- Medical Research
- Pharmacology
- Sterile Processing

Students enrolled in specialized CTE courses have opportunities to participate in clinical rotations off-campus, typically at local hospitals in the South Texas Medical Center. In addition, students also have the opportunity to earn current industry based certifications. This allows students to develop advanced clinical skills necessary for employment in the healthcare industry, as well as continued education in health careers.

In addition to medical CTE courses, HCHS offers nearly 30 Advanced Placement and Pre-AP courses for students to take. Students at HCHS also have access to many opportunities for internships, including those in medical, research, dental, pharmaceutical, or related career fields.

== Athletics ==
HCHS does not have a football, basketball, baseball or volleyball team. HCHS does compete against other schools in golf, tennis, aquatics, bowling, track, and cross country, which HCHS considers "lifetime" sports. The school does compete in 6A classification competitions despite its 3A status, but being a 3A school they perform on a 6A level. The Health Careers athletic department has 1 state title that was won by the girls bowling team in 2019.

== Accolades ==
HCHS was named a National Blue Ribbon School for 1990–1991. It has also received recognition from the Texas Education Agency, including Exemplary campus status and the Gold Performance Acknowledgment.

The school has appeared in several national and state rankings. As well as being listed as one of the top 500 schools in the country by Newsweek for 2005–2007, HCHS was also listed as one of the top schools in Texas by Texas Monthly, and the top high school in San Antonio by Children at Risk. It was named an AP Honor Roll School by the College Board in 2023 and 2024, placing in the Platinum with Access tier. In 2025, HCHS was ranked 16th in the state of Texas and 137th in the United States by US News & World Report. Every year, eligible students attending Health Careers are consistently named semifinalists in the National Merit Scholarship Program.

The school's Latin Club is a nationally award winning group that constantly wins awards on the national level and state level. It is led by HCHS alumni John Chu and Kenny Van Eimeren, both teachers at the school.

== School spirit ==
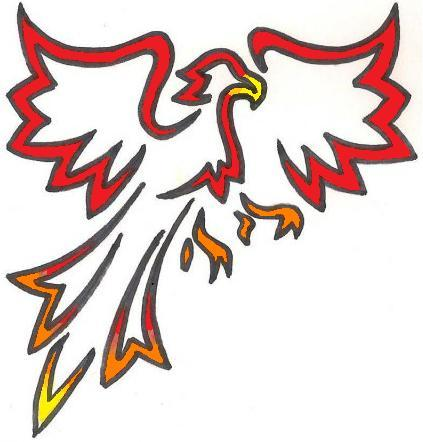
The Phoenix represented in a drawing.

The school mascot is the phoenix, which is sometimes affectionately referred to as the "flaming chicken" and the school colors are blue, white, and maroon. White is used as the graduation cap and gown color as a symbol of perfection and professionalism.

Although HCHS does not offer any official team sports, HCHS upperclassmen take part in the annual Powderpuff Basketball Game every year. The week leading up to the basketball game includes lunch games and pep rally events for students to cheer on the juniors and seniors.
