= Cross Mountain, Texas =

- Census-designated place
- Coordinates: 29°39′20″N 98°39′34″W
- Country: United States
- State: Texas
- County: Bexar

Area
  - Total: 6.7 sq mi (17.4 km^{2})
  - Land: 6.7 sq mi (17.4 km^{2})
  - Water: 0 sq mi (0.0 km^{2})
- Elevation: 1,401 ft (427 m)

Population (2020)
  - Total: 3,944
  - Density: 587/sq mi (227/km^{2})
- Time zone: UTC-6 (Central (CST))
  - Summer (DST): UTC-5 (CDT)
- Zip Code: 78255, 78256
- FIPS code: 48-17811
- GNIS feature ID: 1867546
- ANSI Code: 2407686

Cross Mountain is a census-designated place (CDP) in Bexar County, Texas, United States. The population was 3,944 at the 2020 census, an increase over the figure of 3,124 tabulated in 2010. It is part of the San Antonio Metropolitan Statistical Area.

== Geography ==
Cross Mountain is located in northwestern Bexar County. It is bordered by the city of San Antonio to the east and the CDP of Scenic Oaks to the north. Downtown San Antonio is 22 miles (35 km) to the southeast.

According to the United States Census Bureau, the CDP has a total area of 6.7 square miles (17.4 km^{2}), all land.

== Demographics ==
Historical population
Census	Pop.	Note	%±
1990	1,112		—
2000	1,524		37.1%
2010	3,124		105.0%
2020	3,944		26.2%
U.S. Decennial Census; 1850–1900 1910; 1920 1930 1940; 1950 1960 1970; 1980 1990 2000; 2010 2020

Cross Mountain first appeared as a census designated place in the 1990 U.S. census.

=== Racial and ethnic composition ===
Cross Mountain, Texas – Racial and ethnic composition Note: the US Census treats Hispanic/Latino as an ethnic category. This table excludes Latinos from the racial categories and assigns them to a separate category. Hispanics/Latinos may be of any race.
Race / Ethnicity (NH = Non-Hispanic)	Pop 2000	Pop 2010	Pop 2020	% 2000	% 2010	% 2020
White alone (NH)	1,154	1,993	2,116	75.72%	63.80%	53.65%
Black or African American alone (NH)	40	103	106	2.62%	3.30%	2.69%
Native American or Alaska Native alone (NH)	5	8	5	0.33%	0.26%	0.13%
Asian alone (NH)	21	79	207	1.38%	2.53%	5.25%
Pacific Islander alone (NH)	0	2	7	0.00%	0.06%	0.18%
Other Race alone (NH)	12	3	25	0.79%	0.10%	0.63%
Mixed race or Multiracial (NH)	10	57	175	0.66%	1.82%	4.44%
Hispanic or Latino (any race)	282	879	1,303	18.50%	28.14%	33.04%
Total	1,524	3,124	3,944	100.00%	100.00%	100.00%

=== 2020 census ===
As of the 2020 census, Cross Mountain had a population of 3,944. The median age was 43.2 years. 25.9% of residents were under the age of 18 and 17.3% of residents were 65 years of age or older. For every 100 females there were 98.4 males, and for every 100 females age 18 and over there were 96.8 males age 18 and over.

54.1% of residents lived in urban areas, while 45.9% lived in rural areas.

There were 1,279 households in Cross Mountain, of which 41.0% had children under the age of 18 living in them. Of all households, 73.6% were married-couple households, 10.2% were households with a male householder and no spouse or partner present, and 12.6% were households with a female householder and no spouse or partner present. About 11.8% of all households were made up of individuals and 4.6% had someone living alone who was 65 years of age or older.

There were 1,364 housing units, of which 6.2% were vacant. The homeowner vacancy rate was 1.3% and the rental vacancy rate was 7.1%.

=== 2000 census ===
As of the census of 2000, there were 1,524 people, 529 households, and 464 families residing in the CDP. The population density was 207.6 inhabitants per square mile (80.2/km^{2}). There were 555 housing units at an average density of 75.6 per square mile (29.2/km^{2}). The racial makeup of the CDP was 90.88% White, 2.62% African American, 0.52% Native American, 1.44% Asian, 3.28% from other races, and 1.25% from two or more races. Hispanic or Latino of any race were 18.50% of the population.

There were 529 households, out of which 38.4% had children under the age of 18 living with them, 78.6% were married couples living together, 6.6% had a female householder with no husband present, and 12.1% were non-families. 9.3% of all households were made up of individuals, and 3.4% had someone living alone who was 65 years of age or older. The average household size was 2.85 and the average family size was 3.00.

In the CDP, the population was spread out, with 25.3% under the age of 18, 4.9% from 18 to 24, 25.6% from 25 to 44, 32.9% from 45 to 64, and 11.4% who were 65 years of age or older. The median age was 42 years. For every 100 females, there were 100.5 males. For every 100 females age 18 and over, there were 104.1 males.

The median income for a household in the CDP was $102,628, and the median income for a family was $104,744. Males had a median income of $64,821 versus $37,228 for females. The per capita income for the CDP was $40,549. About 2.2% of families and 3.8% of the population were below the poverty line, including 5.1% of those under age 18 and none of those age 65 or over.

== Education ==
Cross Mountain is served by the Northside Independent School District.

Students are zoned to:

- Ellison Elementary School and Leon Springs Elementary School
- Hector Garcia Middle School (San Antonio)
- Louis D. Brandeis High School
