= Cedric Griffin =

American football player (born 1982)

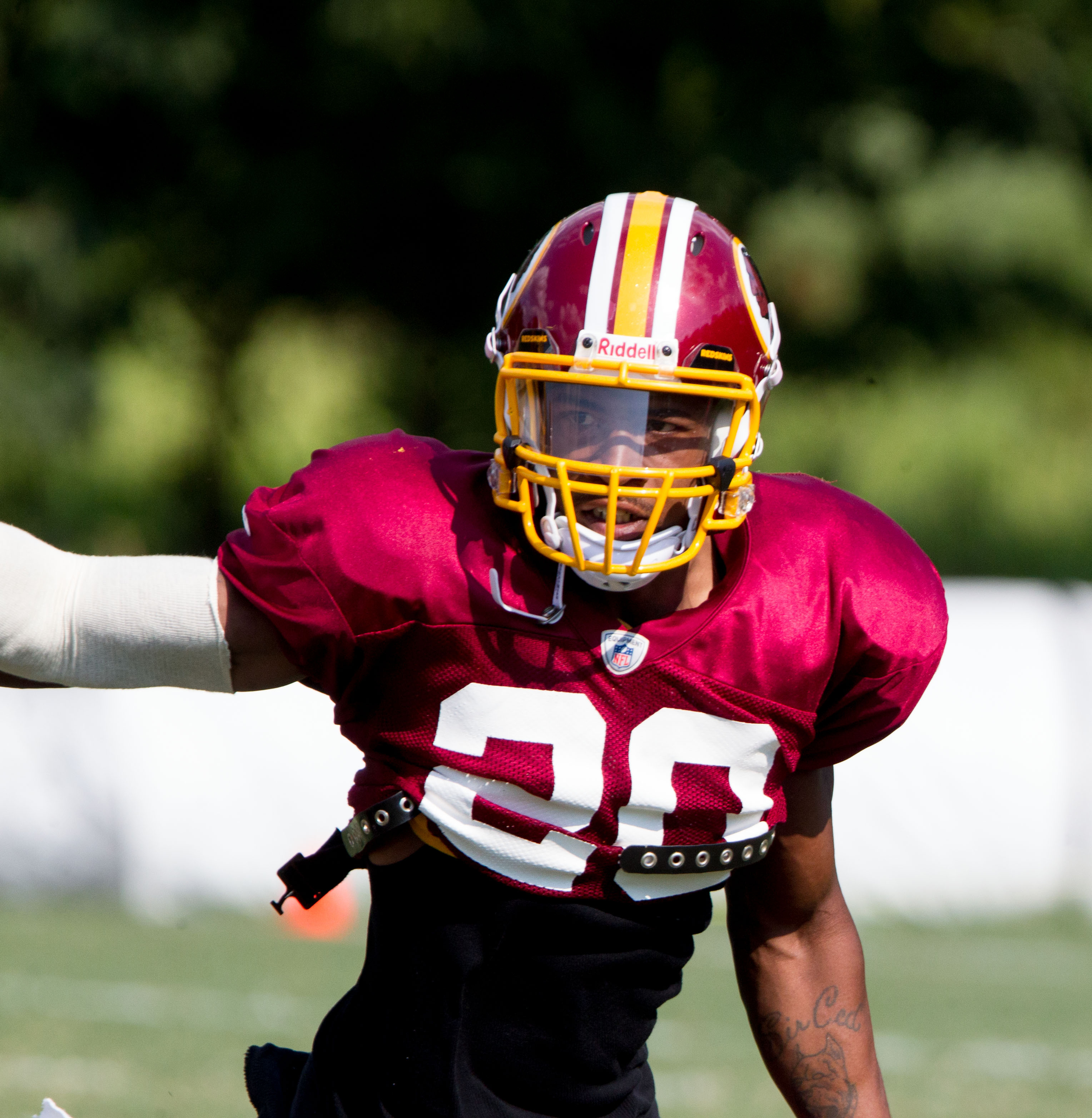
- Griffin with the Washington Redskins in 2012

No. 23, 20
- Position: Cornerback

Personal information
- Born: November 11, 1982 (age 43); Natchez, Mississippi, U.S.
- Listed height: 6 ft 0 in (1.83 m)
- Listed weight: 195 lb (88 kg)

Career information
- High school: Holmes (San Antonio, Texas)
- College: Texas (2001–2005)
- NFL draft: 2006: 2nd round, 48th overall pick

Career history
- Minnesota Vikings (2006−2011); Washington Redskins (2012)

Awards and highlights
- BCS national champion (2005); First-team All-Big 12 (2005)

Career NFL statistics
- Total tackles: 412
- Forced fumbles: 15
- Fumble recoveries: 3
- Pass deflections: 55
- Interceptions: 8
- Defensive touchdowns: 1
- Stats at Pro Football Reference

Cedric Leonard Griffin (born November 11, 1982) is an American former professional football player who was a cornerback in the National Football League (NFL). He was selected by the Minnesota Vikings in the second round of the 2006 NFL draft. He played college football for the Texas Longhorns, where he was a stand-out performer on the 2005 national championship team.

== Early life ==
Griffin played football at Oliver Wendell Holmes High School in San Antonio, Texas under the direction of head coach David Sanchez. He was an All-State Class 5A defensive back in 2000, his senior season. He also played as a wide receiver and accumulated yards rushing and in kick-off and punt returns. As a cornerback, he made 26 tackles and seven interceptions. As a wide receiver, he caught eight passes for 202 yards, including two touchdowns. The same year, he rushed for 198 yards, made a 90-yard kickoff return and returned two punts for 95 yards against Taft High. Griffin played in the first ever U.S. Army All-American Bowl on December 30, 2000. In addition to football, he competed in track. While playing at Holmes High School, Griffin was a part of a State Semifinalist squad that fell one game short of the State Championship. Other standout athletes who played with Griffin on the Holmes football squad include Olympic Gold Medalist in 4 × 400 meter relay Darold Williamson, Robert Quiroga of the Arena Football League, standout defensive tackle at Baylor University Michael Gary, and Division II All-American quarterback from Texas Lutheran University Sean Salinas.

== College career ==
After redshirting his freshman year, Griffin played in all 51 games over the next four years, including 44 games as a starter. He recorded 271 tackles (170 solo tackles), broke up 32 passes (ranking in the school's top 15 for pass deflections) and intercepted three others for 29 yards in interception return yards. In 2002, Griffin became the first UT player ever to return a blocked field goal for a touchdown, when he returned one 56 yards at Tulane University.

As a junior, he was tabbed honorable mention All-Big 12 by the conference coaches for 2004. As a senior on UT's 2005 National Championship team, he was a key part of the UT pass defense that ranked eighth in the nation in yards allowed by game (172.0) and fourth in the nation in pass efficiency defense (96.7 rating). In Texas' 41–38 victory over USC for the National Championship Game, he made 8 tackles, including 6 solo tackles. Defensive statistics:

*includes bowl games
Year	GP	GS	TK	SO	AS	FR	FC	INT	TFL	PBU	SACK	PRES
2002	13	06	69	38	31	0	2	0	3.0-18	4	1.0-13	4
2003	13	13	48	31	17	0	0	1	1.0-2	7	0.0-0	1
2004	12	12	68	53	15	1	1	2	3.0-5	6	0.0-0	0
2005	13	13	86	48	38	1	2	0	1.0-2	15	0.0-0	0
TOTAL	51	44	271	170	101	1	5	3	8.0-27	32	1-0-13	5

== Professional career ==
Pre-draft measurables
Height	Weight	Arm length	Hand span	40-yard dash	10-yard split	20-yard split	20-yard shuttle	Three-cone drill	Vertical jump	Broad jump	Bench press
6 ft 0 1/8 in (1.83 m)	199 lb (90 kg)	32 5/8 in (0.83 m)	9 3/8 in (0.24 m)	4.51 s	1.63 s	2.67 s	4.10 s	6.84 s	35.5 in (0.90 m)	10 ft 5 in (3.18 m)	17 reps
All values from NFL Combine

=== Minnesota Vikings ===
Griffin was selected in the second round (number 48 overall) by the Minnesota Vikings. According to the UT football website:

Griffin joins Michael Huff (No. 7 overall) as the second Longhorn defensive back chosen in the 2006 draft, marking the first time since 1997 two have been selected in the same draft when Bryant Westbrook was chosen by the Detroit Lions in the first round and Taje Allen was picked by the St. Louis Rams in the fifth round... Along with Huff, Griffin's selection gives the Longhorns a defensive back selection in four of the past five drafts... Griffin is the first Longhorn selected by the Vikings since DT John Haines in 1984. The Longhorns have now had at least three players drafted in each of the last four years.

Griffin is the highest-drafted defensive back chosen by the Vikings since Orlando Thomas (number 42 overall) was selected in 1995. Counting Griffin, the Vikings have taken five players over the past five NFL drafts who have come into the NFL with a college national championship to their credit. The others (with school and draft year) are Bryant McKinnie (University of Miami – 2002), Kenechi Udeze (University of Southern California – 2004), Darrion Scott (Ohio State University – 2004), Dustin Fox (Ohio State University – 2005), and Percy Harvin (University of Florida – 2009).

Griffin came into training camp with the expectation of being the team's nickel or dime back (3rd or 4th cornerback). When second year man Dovonte Edwards went down with a broken arm in the preseason many people believe it would be Griffin who would step into the Nickelback role that was vacated by Edwards when he went down with an injury. Instead the Vikings chose to go with Ronyell Whitaker. Griffin began getting more and more playing time as the season played on, eventually Griffin overtook a starting cornerback spot from prized free agent signing from two years earlier Fred Smoot. Griffin played well as a rookie and impressed the coaching staff. He recorded his first career interception against the Detroit Lions. During the 2007 season he struggled as a starter, recording zero interceptions and getting beat often. But in 2008, he played well, recording over 100 tackles and one interception.

He was due to be a free agent after 2009 season. But on March 21, 2009, the Vikings re-signed Griffin to a five-year contract for a total of a little more than $25 million. The contract contained $10 million in guaranteed money.

In 2009, he led the team with 4 interceptions, while recording 78 tackles and forcing three fumbles. The Vikings made it all the way to the NFC Championship against the New Orleans Saints. In the game, Griffin tore the Anterior cruciate ligament in his left knee, which was successfully repaired in the offseason. Griffin rehabilitated throughout the pre-season and was able to return in 2010 to play in the Vikings' Week 3 victory over the Detroit Lions. However, during the Vikings' Week 5 loss against the New York Jets Griffin sustained an injury to his right knee (he had previously injured his left knee in the 2009 NFC Championship). However, the next day, after undergoing an MRI it was determined that Griffin had torn the ACL in his right knee and he was placed on season ending injured reserve. The Vikings terminated Griffin's contract on March 10, 2012.

=== Washington Redskins ===
Griffin signed a one-year, $2.5 million contract with the Washington Redskins on March 16, 2012. Late in the first half of the 2012 season opener against the New Orleans Saints, he tackled Marques Colston as the latter was heading towards the endzone and caused him to fumble. The ball then rolled out of the back of the end zone and was ruled a touchback, which helped the Redskins beat the Saints, 40 to 32. On December 4, Griffin was suspended for four games due to violating the NFL's policy on performance-enhancing substances. The next day it was confirmed that he tested positive for Adderall.

With his suspension over, Griffin was returned to the Redskins' active roster on January 4, 2013.

=== NFL statistics ===
Year	Team	GP	COMB	TOTAL	AST	SACK	FF	FR	FR YDS	INT	IR YDS	AVG IR	LNG	TD	PD
2006	MIN	14	43	38	5	0.0	2	1	0	2	4	2	4	0	10
2007	MIN	16	92	82	10	0.0	2	1	0	0	0	0	0	0	10
2008	MIN	16	91	80	11	0.0	5	0	0	1	-2	-2	-2	0	14
2009	MIN	16	78	65	13	0.0	3	0	0	4	-2	-1	0	0	6
2010	MIN	2	8	7	1	0.0	0	0	0	0	0	0	0	0	1
2011	MIN	16	67	55	12	0.0	3	0	0	1	0	0	0	0	9
2012	WSH	9	33	25	8	0.0	1	0	0	0	0	0	0	0	4
Career		89	412	352	60	0.0	16	2	0	8	0	0	4	0	54
