= Boone Logan =

American baseball player (born 1984)

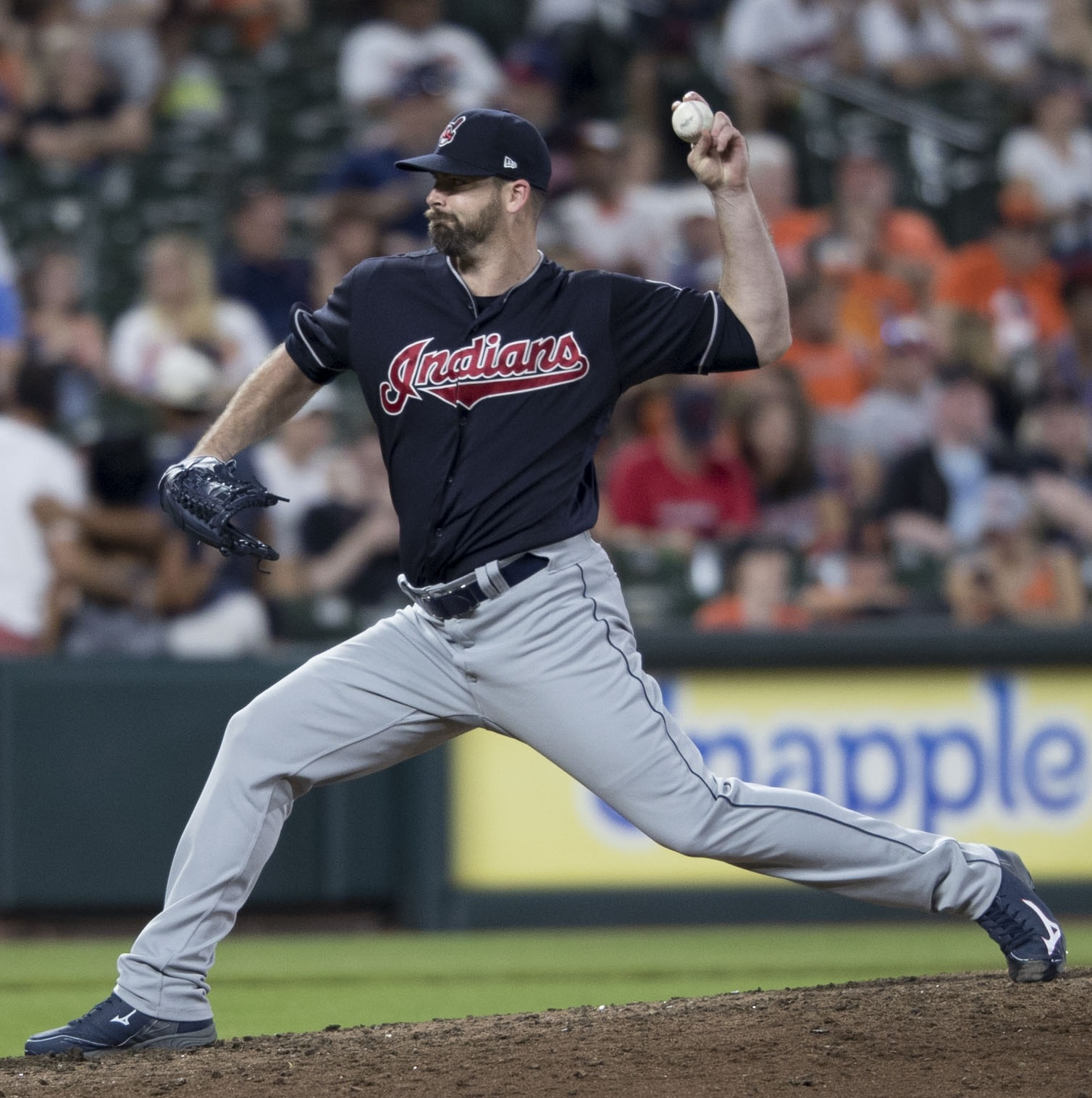
- Logan pitching for the Cleveland Indians in 2017
- Pitcher
- Born: August 13, 1984 (age 42); San Antonio, Texas, U.S.
- Batted: Right Threw: Left

MLB debut
- April 4, 2006, for the Chicago White Sox

Last MLB appearance
- June 16, 2018, for the Milwaukee Brewers

MLB statistics
- Win–loss record: 30–23
- Earned run average: 4.50
- Strikeouts: 479
- Stats at Baseball Reference

Teams
- Chicago White Sox (2006–2008); Atlanta Braves (2009); New York Yankees (2010–2013); Colorado Rockies (2014–2016); Cleveland Indians (2017); Milwaukee Brewers (2018)

Boone Logan (born August 13, 1984) is an American former professional baseball relief pitcher. He played in Major League Baseball (MLB) for the Chicago White Sox, Atlanta Braves, New York Yankees, Colorado Rockies, Cleveland Indians, and Milwaukee Brewers from 2006 to 2018.

== Early life ==
Logan grew up in Helotes, Texas and attended Sandra Day O'Connor High School in Helotes. He attended and pitched for Temple College in Temple, Texas, in 2003.

== Playing career ==
=== Chicago White Sox ===
The Chicago White Sox selected Logan in the 20th round (600th overall) of the 2002 Major League Baseball draft. He advanced from the Sox's Rookie League affiliate, the Great Falls White Sox, straight to the major league club during spring training in 2006.

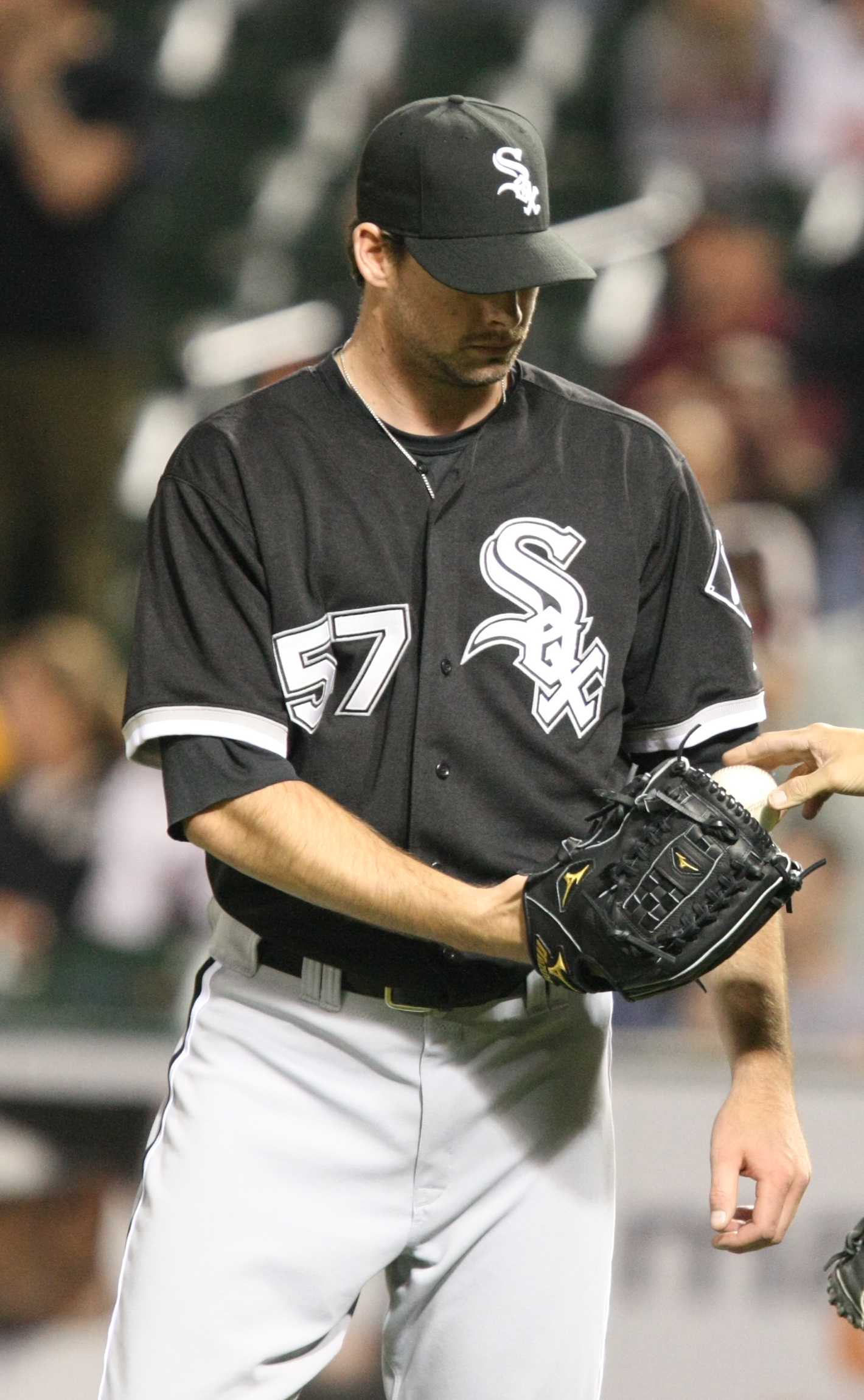
Logan with the Chicago White Sox in 2008

Logan made his major league debut on April 4, 2006, against the Cleveland Indians. During 2006, Logan made 21 relief appearances with one save despite splitting his time in the Minors but accumulated an 8.31 ERA in the Majors that year.

In 2007, Logan made 68 relief appearances, and was 2–1 with a 4.97 ERA. In 2008, he made 55 appearances, going 2–3 with a 5.95 ERA.

=== Atlanta Braves ===
On December 4, 2008, Logan was traded, along with Javier Vázquez, to the Atlanta Braves for minor league catcher Tyler Flowers, shortstop Brent Lillibridge, third baseman Jon Gilmore and pitcher Santos Rodriguez.

During the 2009 season, Logan made 20 relief appearances, going 1–1 with a 5.19 ERA.

=== New York Yankees ===
On December 22, 2009, Logan was once again traded along with Javier Vázquez, this time to the New York Yankees for Melky Cabrera, and prospects Michael Dunn and Arodys Vizcaíno. On April 16, 2010, Logan was called up by the Yankees to replace Chan Ho Park in the Yankee bullpen. In 2010, Logan made 51 relief appearances, going 2–0 with a 2.93 ERA.

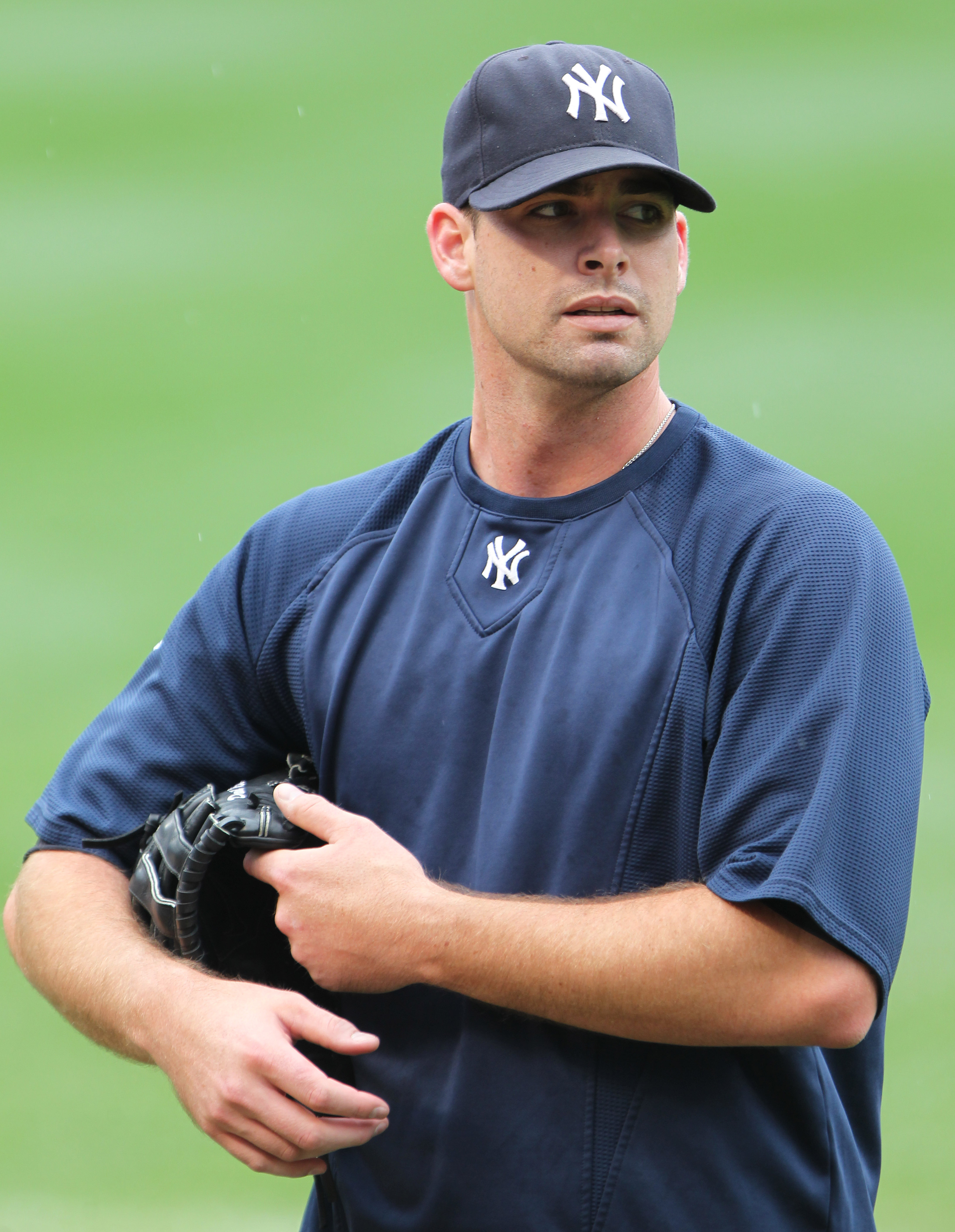
Logan with the New York Yankees in 2011

In 2011, he made 64 relief appearances going 5–3 with a 3.46 ERA. Logan made an MLB-leading 80 relief appearances in 2012, going 7–2 with one save and a 3.74 ERA.

In 2013, he made 61 appearances from the bullpen, going 5–2 with a 3.23 ERA. On October 4, 2013, Logan underwent surgery in his left elbow to remove a bone spur. He became a free agent at the end of the season.

=== Colorado Rockies ===
On December 16, 2013, Logan signed a three-year, $16.5 million deal with the Colorado Rockies.

On September 12, 2014, Logan again underwent surgery in his left elbow to remove a bone spur, abruptly ending his 2014 season. In 35 games, Logan went 2–3 with a 6.84 ERA.

Logan pitched in 60 games for the Rockies the following season, going 0–3 with a 4.33 ERA. In 2016, he went 2–5 with a 3.69 ERA. He became a free agent following the 2016 season.

=== Cleveland Indians ===
On February 7, 2017, Logan signed with the Cleveland Indians to a one-year contract with an option for the 2018 season. In 38 games with Cleveland, he was 1–0 with a 4.71 ERA.

The Indians declined to exercise their club option on Logan's contract for the 2018 season on November 6, 2017, making Logan a free agent.

=== Milwaukee Brewers ===
On January 10, 2018, Logan signed a one-year deal with the Milwaukee Brewers worth $1.875 million. On June 19, Logan was designated for assignment and was released on June 24.

== Pitching style ==
Logan threw with a sidearm delivery, making him appealing as a left-handed specialist. Left-handed hitters batted only .238 against him in his career, while righties hit .291. Logan was especially tough against lefties because his primary pitch was a slider in the low 80s that broke sharply away from them. This was his favorite pitch to throw in two-strike counts. He also had a four-seam fastball and two-seam fastball that appeared in the 92-95 mph range. Logan also threw a high-80s changeup from time to time against right-handers.
