= William Howard Taft High School (San Antonio) =

High school in San Antonio, Texas

William H. Taft High School

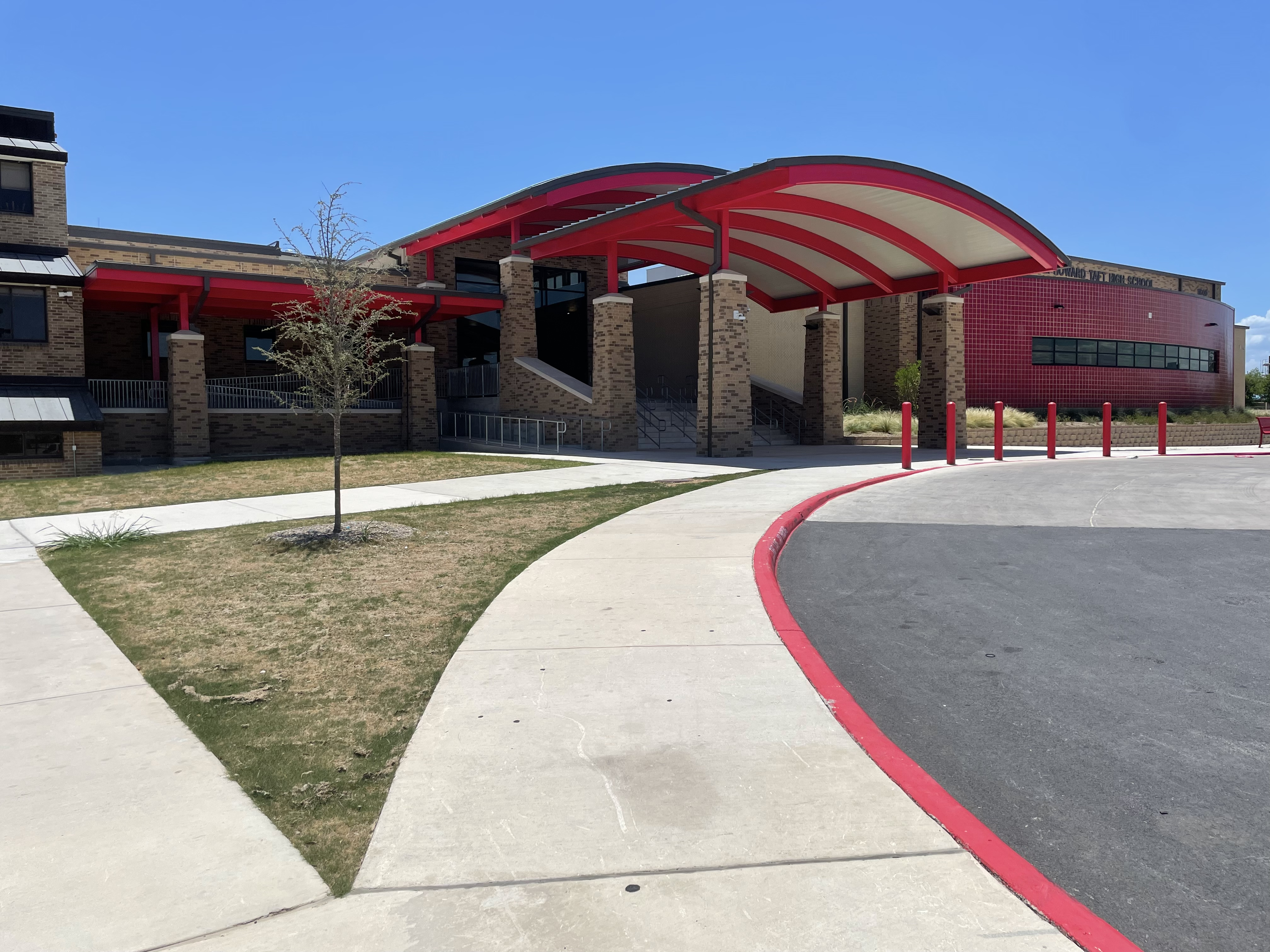
- New entrance and library, completed 2022

Location
- 11600 Culebra Road; San Antonio, Bexar County, Texas 78253; United States; 29.498255°N 98.721580°W

Information
- School type: Public, high school
- Founded: 1985
- School district: Northside Independent School District
- Superintendent: Brian T. Woods
- NCES School ID: 483312006148
- Principal: Aurelio Hernandez
- Faculty: 155.52 (on an FTE basis)
- Grades: 9–12
- Enrollment: 2,719 (2023–2024)
- Student to teacher ratio: 17.48
- Language: English
- Campus: Suburban
- Colors: Red and white
- Athletics conference: UIL Class AAAAAA
- Mascot: Raider
- Sports District: 28-6A
- Feeder Middle Schools: H.B. Zachry; John B. Connally; Wallace B. Jefferson; Dolph Briscoe
- Rival schools: William J. Brennan High School; Earl Warren High School; Sandra Day O'connor High School
- Website: Official Website

William Howard Taft High School is a public high school in the Northside Independent School District (NISD) of San Antonio, Texas, United States. As with all NISD high schools, the school is named for a United States Supreme Court justice, in this case former Chief Justice William Howard Taft, who was also the 27th President of the United States. For the 2024–2025 school year, the school received an overall rating of "B" from the Texas Education Agency.

Taft High School was the fifth NISD high school, and the first outside Loop 1604. It is home to the magnet school Communications Arts High School which focuses primarily on college readiness and technology. The building was designed by Noonan & Dockery & Noonan & Rogers Architects and was built by the H.B. Zachry Company.

Taft was named a National Blue Ribbon School in 1997–98. For the 2021–2022 school year, the school was given a "B" by the Texas Education Agency, with a distinction for Academic Achievement in Social Studies.

== Athletics ==
The Taft Raiders compete in the following sports:

- Baseball
- Basketball
- Cross country
- Football
- Golf
- Soccer
- Softball
- Swimming & diving
- Tennis
- Track
- Volleyball

== Marching Band ==
The Taft Raider Band has over 190 students from Communications Arts and Taft. The band qualified for the state marching contest in 2014. They participate in Region 29 and Area H UIL competitions.

== Taft Raiders football ==
In December 2001 the Taft Raiders competed in the 2001 class 5A Division 1 State Championship game. The Taft Raiders faced the Mesquite Skeeters at Alamo Stadium in San Antonio, Texas. But the Taft Raiders would lose to the Skeeters by a final score of 14–13. And the Taft Raiders became 2001 State runner-up. The Taft Raiders year by year results of Texas high school football are below from 1997 to 2024

Years	Records	Head coach	Season Results
1997	N/A	N/A	State Semifinalist losing to Katy Tigers 16-35 (5A D1)
2001	12-3	Bridges	State Finalist losing to Mesquite Skeeters 13-14 (5A D1)
2003	7-4	Bridges	Bi District round losing to Smithson Valley Rangers 14-24(5A D2)
2004	10-4	Bridges	State Quarterfinalist losing to Smithson Valley Rangers 24-42 (5A D2)
2005	2-8	Davenport	No playoffs
2006	4-6	Davenport	No playoffs
2007	4-7	Davenport	Bi District round losing to East Central 17-22 (5A D2)
2008	3-7	Davenport	No playoffs
2009	5-5	Davenport	No playoffs
2010	1-9	Davenport	No playoffs
2011	1-9	Davenport	No playoffs
2012	3-7	Davenport	No playoffs
2013	2-8	Davenport	No playoffs
2014	4-6	Davenport	No playoffs
2015	3-7	Davenport	No playoffs
2016	4-6	Davenport	No playoffs
2017	2-8	Davenport	No playoffs
2018	3-8	Stade	No playoffs
2019	3-7	Stade	No playoffs
2020	8-4	Stade	3rd round playoff loss to Hays 41-62 (6A D2)
2021	9-3	Stade	2nd round playoff loss to Edinburg Vela 24-27 (6A D2)
2022	8-4	Stade	2nd round playoff loss to San Benito 19-38 (6A D1)
2023	6-5	Stade	Bi District finalist losing to Laredo United 28-35 (6A D1)
2024	6-5	Stade	Bi District finalist losing to San Antonio Johnson 7-49 (6A D1)

== Notable alumni ==
- Derek Cecil (Class of 1991) — Actor; starred in House of Cards on Netflix
- James Roday Rodriguez (Class of 1994) — Actor, director, screenwriter; known for USA Network series Psych
- Haley Scarnato (Class of 2000) — Singer; placed 8th on Season 6 of American Idol
- Otis McDaniel (Class of 2004) — Gold medal-winning sprinter specializing in the 100 and 200 meters dashes
- Ike Ofoegbu (Class of 2004) - American-Nigerian Israeli Premier Basketball League player
- Julian Boyd (Class of 2008) - Basketball player who plays professionally in Taiwan
