= Dub Farris Athletic Complex =

Sporting complex in San Antonio, Texas

Coordinates: 29.5634°N 98.6535°W

- Interactive map of Dub Farris Athletic Complex
- Address: 8400 N Loop 1604 W, San Antonio, TX 78249; San Antonio; United States

Construction
- Opened: 2003

The Dub Farris Athletic Complex is a sporting complex with the Dub Farris Stadium

owned by the Northside ISD located in San Antonio, Texas.

The complex is known for its 10,568-seat football & soccer stadium but it is also home to a large natatorium and the Northside Sports Gym. In 2010, NISD announced a three-year agreement that allowed the UTSA Roadrunners football team to use the stadium for practice.
