= Construction Careers Academy =

Magnet school in Texas, United States

Location
- 9411 Military Dr. W San Antonio, Bexar County, Texas 78251; United States
- Coordinates: 29.463478°N 98.669941°W

Information
- School type: Public, High School Magnet
- Founded: 2009
- School district: Northside Independent School District
- Superintendent: Brian T. Woods
- Principal: Lance Enderlin
- Grades: 9-12
- Enrollment: 523 (2017)
- Colors: Purple, Silver, Black
- Website: Official Website

Construction Careers Academy is a magnet school in the Northside Independent School District of San Antonio, Texas, United States. Founded in 2009, the school is a "school within a school" sharing the campus of Earl Warren High School with an academic focus on construction related skills.

Students accepted to the academy can choose from one of nine majors to include architecture and design, engineering, construction management, electrical, HVAC, plumbing, pipefitting, welding and carpentry.
