= Sandra Day O'Connor High School (Texas) =

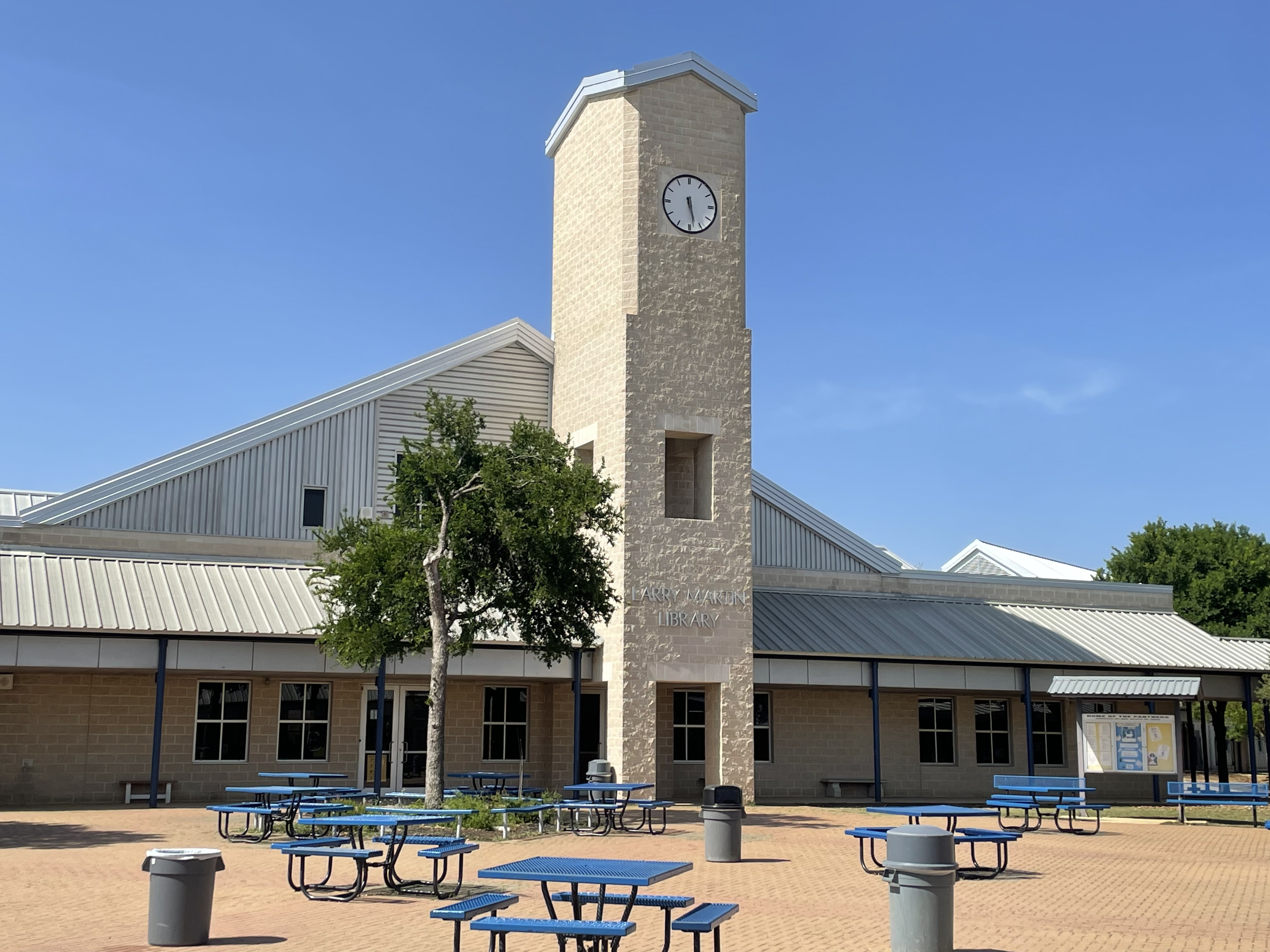
- Larry Martin Library

Location
- 12221 Leslie Road; Helotes, Bexar County, Texas 78023; United States; 29.552703°N 98.667526°W

Information
- School type: Public, High School
- Motto: Love Navy, Live Gold
- Founded: 1998
- School district: Northside Independent School District
- Superintendent: John Craft
- Principal: Mark Lopez
- Staff: 147.90 (FTE)
- Grades: 9–12
- Enrollment: 2,535 (2024–2025)
- Student to teacher ratio: 17.14
- Colors: Navy blue, Vegas gold, and White
- Athletics conference: UIL Class AAAAAA
- Mascot: Panthers
- Newspaper: The Prowler
- Communities served: Greater Helotes, TX
- Sports District: 28-6A
- Feeder Middle Schools: Folks MS; Garcia MS; Jefferson MS; Stevenson MS
- Feeder Elementary Schools: Aue ES; Brauchle ES; Braun Station ES; Carson ES; Ellison ES; Helotes ES; Kuentz ES; Los Reyes ES; Nichols ES; Steubing ES
- Website: official website

Sandra Day O'Connor High School is a public high school in Helotes, Texas, United States, in the San Antonio metropolitan area. It is a part of the Northside Independent School District.

== Overview ==
Opened in 1998, O'Connor High School followed the tradition of all the Northside high schools in being named after a Supreme Court justice, Sandra Day O'Connor, who served from 1981 to 2006, and was the first female justice on United States Supreme Court. The school colors are navy blue, white, and old gold, and the mascot is the Panther. The first principal was Ken Patranella, who served from 1998 to 2003. He was succeeded by Larry Martin, who served as principal from 2003 to 2009. The O'Connor library is named in Martin's honor. Mark Lopez is the current principal. O'Connor High School serves the entire town of Helotes along with parts of unincorporated Bexar County and the larger central city of San Antonio. For the 2024-2025 school year, the school was given an "B" by the Texas Education Agency.

In keeping with a low building scale with respect to the rural surroundings, the campus was designed by Marmon Mok, LLP with a "village concept" and now consists of 15 separate main buildings connected by covered walkways, and 7 buildings for the FFA program. Metal roofs, limestone colored split face CMU, and steel siding were used to follow the German Hill Country vernacular style. The campus features a 990-seat auditorium and an 1800-seat competition gymnasium. The electrical feeders and chilled/hot water piping to the buildings are located above the soffits of canopies connecting each building, avoiding costly trenching. To meet an aggressive construction schedule, pre-engineered steel frames were used for all common buildings while classroom buildings G, H, J, and F use a combination of structural steel and reinforced concrete.

To accommodate a student population larger than the 2,400 designed for, a new building including a band hall and dance studio and the multipurpose AG building was built and the cafeteria expanded in 2003. New walkway and bus loop canopies, a canopy to create a covered eating area, and the stair tower for building H were also built in 2003, along with the blacktop marching pad, expansion of the brick-paved courtyard area, and the addition of another chiller. Two new AG barns were built in 2007, and a new two-story classroom building (F) was built in 2012. Despite the additions and the construction of Louis D. Brandeis High School, O’Connor has experienced overcrowding since its opening and has always had over 30 classes in portable buildings.

== Athletics ==
Students can participate in a wide variety of UIL 6A school sports including:

- Baseball
- Basketball
- Cheerleading
- Cross Country
- Football (Freshman, JV, & Varsity)
- Goldusters Dance Team
- Dazzler Drill Team
- Starduster Pep Squad
- Golf
- Soccer
- Softball
- Swimming & Diving
- Tennis
- Track
- Volleyball

Most school sports have practices and home games at O'Connor High itself. However, the football team, soccer team, and swimming & diving team uses the Dub Farris Athletic Complex off of Loop 1604 and Bamberger Trail for practice and home venues.

== Agriculture Science & Technology Academy ==
In 2021, Northside ISD opened its 7th Magnet High School at Sandra Day O'Connor HS. Previously, students residing in NISD, but not in the O'Connor Zone could apply to a very selective amount of spots for the Agriculture Endorsement. The Northside Board unanimously voted to establish the Agriculture Science & Technology Academy at O'Connor HS. Every year, a class of 250 Freshman residing outside of O'Connor are permitted to attend O'Connor through a lottery system. O'Connor offers 9 Industry Based Certifications through the new magnet school:

- Texas Beef Quality Assurance Certification
- Texas Certified Nursery Professional Certification
- Texas State Floral Certification
- American Welding Society Certification
- Southwest Airlines Professional Communications Certification
- Professional Financial Literacy Certification
- Hunter Safety Certification
- Boater Education Certification
- Certified Veterinary Assistant Certification.

The school has its own administration team, with Chad Bohlken as the principal. The Northside Bond of 2022 allocated $19,100,000 for Agriculture Science Expansion including new barns.

O'Connor has the largest and most expansive Future Farmers of America complex in the Northside Independent School District. In the Agriculture Department at O'Connor program, students learn agricultural techniques in a hands-on environment. Any student residing in the Northside Independent School District is able to transfer from their zoned high school to attend O'Connor in order to participate in the agriculture program. The O'Connor National FFA Organization is one of the largest in the Texas FFA Association.

== Band ==
The Sandra Day O'Connor High School Marching Band has been in existence since the school was opened, and it is one of the largest high school marching bands in Texas, with over 360 members at its height. The band was led by Wallace Dierolf from its inception until 2004. After Dierolf's retirement, the school's newly built multipurpose facility, containing both a band hall and a dance studio, was named after him. When Louis D. Brandeis High School opened in 2008, the band's numbers dropped to 230, but grew back to 380 members. During the COVID-19 pandemic, the band's numbers slightly dropped to 250 due to some members leaving and the social distancing protocols that were in effect. When Dierolf retired, Roland Sandoval took his place and led the band from 2004 to 2018. The current head director is Bobby Deleon Jr. Associate Directors are Gabriel Valdéz, and José Marín.

Year	Theme	Musical Composer	Drill Writer	Notable achievements
2001	"Homage: Three Tapestries"			
2002	"Riverdance"			
2003	"Fiddler on the Roof"			
2008	"Things That Go Pop"	Key Poulan	Roland Sandoval	Advanced to State Competition for the first time, Placed 26th out of 31 bands
2009	"BOO! In a Darkened Hall"	Key Poulan	Roland Sandoval	
2010	"Phobia: What Are You Afraid Of?"	Key Poulan	Roland Sandoval	Advanced to the State Competition, Placed 33rd out of 36 bands; 20th out of 53 bands at BOA San Antonio Super Regional
2011	"Chrysalis: A Journey Within"	Aaron Guidry	Roland Sandoval	27th out of 59 bands at BOA San Antonio Super Regional
2012	"Rain"	Daniel Montoya Jr.	Roland Sandoval	2nd place in Area, Advanced to State Competition, Placed 22nd out of 38 bands; 28th out of 62 bands at BOA San Antonio Super Regional
2013	"Zombie Apocalypse"	Daniel Montoya Jr.	Roland Sandoval	44th out of 64 bands at BOA San Antonio Super Regional
2014	"Between Heaven and Earth"	Daniel Montoya Jr.	Roland Sandoval	1st place in Area, Advanced to State Competition, Placed 28th out of 37 bands; 40th out of 64 bands at BOA San Antonio Super Regional
2015	"Access Denied"	Daniel Montoya Jr.	Roland Sandoval	40th out of 59 bands at BOA San Antonio Super Regional
2016	"The Living Sea"	Ron Ellis	Roland Sandoval	32nd out of 63 bands at BOA San Antonio Super Regional
2017	"Welcome to the Jungle"	Ron Ellis	Roland Sandoval	35th out of 68 bands at BOA San Antonio Super Regional
2018	"iFly"	Cesar Gonzales	Brandon Smith	58th out of 84 bands at BOA San Antonio Super Regional
2019	"More Than Machine"	Cesar Gonzales	Brandon Smith	46th out of 84 bands at BOA San Antonio Super Regional
2020	"Dreams"	Cesar Gonzales	Brandon Smith	(non-competitive season due to the COVID-19 pandemic)
2021	"The Fairest of Them All"	Cesar Gonzales	Brandon Smith	41st out of 72 bands at BOA San Antonio Super Regional

== Theatre ==
The O'Connor theatre program was pioneered by the Drama Department director Deann Fleming's (whom has since retired) senior one-act project. It allows fourth-year theatre students to direct their own shows and produce them through via the International Thespian Society at the Texas State and International Thespian Festivals.

In addition, the drama students participate as Korny Klowns in the annual Helotes festival Cornyval, an event that allows the students to express themselves creatively and humorously while providing a service to the Helotes community. The Drama Department is a 6A participant in The University Interscholastic League. In May 2024, the drama department earned its first trip to UIL State competition.

The O'Connor theatre program is currently a part of the Texas Thespian Society Troupe #5872.

== Air Force JROTC ==
O'Connor activated their Air Force JROTC detachment (TX-20082) for the 2008–2009 school year. It was founded under LtCol James Payne (USAF ret.). In 2012 the JROTC department, along with the Math department, moved into a newly constructed permanent facility on the northwest side of the campus.

JROTC performs ceremonial Color Guard and Honor Guard for numerous school and Civic Organizations. They have 10 teams that compete at the local, state and national levels. Those teams are Cyber Patriot, Marksmanship, Physical Training, Honor Guard, Armed Drill and Unarmed Drill, Panther Crew, Awareness Presentation Team, Kitty Hawk Honor Society, and Academic Bowl.

JROTC detachments are required to perform community service in addition to teaching an Air Force approved curriculum. Cadets performed over 4,270 hours of community service in the 2016–2017 school year. They are frequent volunteers at the San Antonio Food Bank, have a long-standing relationship with the Helotes Cornyval Association and Scholarship Beauty Pageant and participate in 6-8 Elementary School Carnivals for Northside Independent School District schools. They instituted a training program for Kuentz Elementary School's Safety Patrol Squad that raises and lowers the flags every day.

== Notable alumni ==
- Boone Logan (Class of 2002) - Major League Baseball pitcher.
- Justin Olsen (Class of 2005) - 2010 Winter Olympic Gold Medalist for the U.S. in four-man Bobsleigh
- Simran Jeet Singh (Class of 2002) - educator, writer, and activist; 2016 Northside Independent School District Pillar of Respect
- JC Caylen (Class of 2011) - Actor and YouTube personality
