= John Jay Science and Engineering Academy =

Location
- 7611 Marbach Road; San Antonio, Bexar County, Texas 78227; United States; 29.4184135°N 98.6429006°W

Information
- Type: Public Secondary Magnet
- Established: 1997
- School district: NISD
- Superintendent: Brian T. Woods
- Principal: Teresa Cuellar
- Grades: 9 - 12
- Enrollment: 750
- Colors: Blue, Silver, White
- Mascot: Mustangs
- Website: www.nisd.net/sciaca/ nisd.net/schools/info/17/

John Jay Science and Engineering Academy is a magnet school in San Antonio, Texas (United States).

The Principal of the Academy is Teresa Cuellar, and the Vice Principal is Crystal Mitchell.

In 2009, the school was rated "academically acceptable" by the Texas Education Agency.

== NCSSSMST ==
The John Jay Science and Engineering Academy has been an affiliate member of the National Consortium for Specialized Secondary Schools of Mathematics, Science and Technology since 1997. Over the years, students and faculty have participated in Student Conferences, Science Research Symposium, and Professional Conferences at schools, colleges and universities throughout the country.

== Extra-curricular student activities ==
Students are required to do a science fair research project for both freshman and sophomore years of their education. In the students junior and senior year they then have the choice between Science Fair, History Fair, ACE Mentorship, Independent Study Mentorship (ISM), or Robotics. It is encouraged for students to take part in one or more extra-curricular activities relating to research, engineering, and social sciences. Among these are the Science Fair Research Team, History Fair Research Team, Academic Decathlon Team, Science UIL Team, Model United Nations Team, World Quest Team, and Robotics Team.

The school is also home to a fine arts program.

The AFJROTC is a program both locally and nationally.

The John Jay Robotics Team is the robotics team at John Jay Science and Engineering Academy. The team participates in two competitions annually. The first of which is BEST (Boosting Engineering Science and Technology). In this competition the team is given a box of supplies and 6 weeks to build a robot with limited supplies provided by BEST. In addition to Robotics at the best competition there are many other aspects of competition that are weighted more heavily than the actual robot. These categories are Project Engineering Notebook, Marketing Presentation and Team Exhibit and Interviews. The official team number is 46. The second competition is FRC (FIRST Robotics Competition). In this competition the team is given another 6 weeks to build a robot, but with fewer restrictions on supplies. These robots must cooperate and compete with other robots on the field during competition. The robot must be able to score points in accordance with that years particular competition. There are many other aspects to this competition like Chairman's Award, Entrepreneurship Award, FIRST Dean's List Award and Safety Animation Award. The Teams official name for FIRST is Team Orion and the number is 3240.
