= Northside Independent School District =

School district in Texas, United States

Coordinates: 29°28′29″N 98°34′53″W

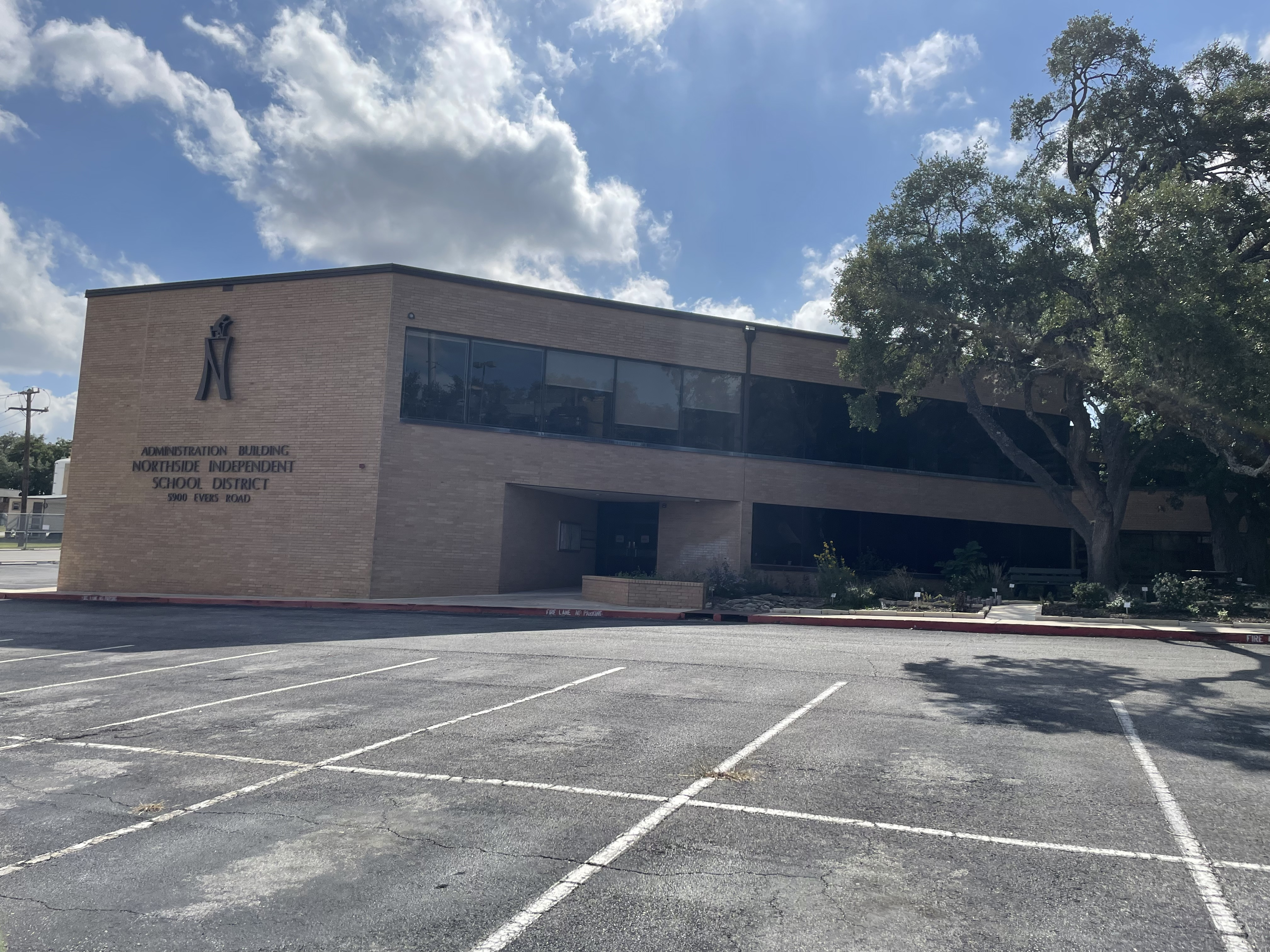

Location
- 5900 Evers Road, San Antonio, TX, 78238 United States

District information
- Type: Public
- Grades: K-12
- Established: 1949
- Superintendent: John Craft
- NCES District ID: 4833120

Students and staff
- Students: 106,000+
- Teachers: 6240
- Staff: 12847
- Student–teacher ratio: 15.6:1

Other information
- Website: nisd.net

Northside Independent School District is a school district headquartered in Leon Valley, Texas. It is the largest school district in the San Antonio area and the fourth-largest in the State of Texas. Northside serves 355 square miles (920 km^{2}) of urban landscape, suburban growth, and rural territory in the San Antonio suburbs and the Hill Country. Northside is roughly 50% built out with the center of the district's boundaries near Helotes, just north of the Bandera Road and Loop 1604 intersection. Because of fast-paced growth, the district envisions possibly another four high schools over the next few decades, including far west areas off Potranco Road and Hwy 211 (near the Medina County line), Culebra Road (FM 471) past Talley Road, I-10 near Boerne Stage Road (north of the Dominion) and far north Bandera Road (Hwy 16) near the Pipe Creek/Bandera County/Medina County areas.

Northside ISD serves a portion of the city of San Antonio, as well as the cities of Grey Forest, Leon Valley, Shavano Park, and Helotes, and the unincorporated communities of Cross Mountain, Leon Springs, and Scenic Oaks. The district also serves some unincorporated portions of Bexar, Bandera and Medina Counties.

In 2011, the school district was rated "recognized" by the Texas Education Agency for the fourth consecutive year.

== Administration ==
=== Superintendent ===
The superintendent of Northside ISD was Dr. Brian Woods. Prior to his appointment in 2012, he was a social studies teacher, administrator, the assistant superintendent for secondary administration, and the named deputy superintendent for administration for the school district. In June of 2023, Dr. Woods retired after 11 years as superintendent. As of August 2023, Dr. John Craft is the superintendent of the district.

== Campuses ==
Northside ISD has over 110 campus locations:

Northside has chosen a unique method of naming its traditional high schools; each school is named for a former or current United States Supreme Court justice. Under current district policy, eighth graders who will be part of a new high school's first graduating class are encouraged to research prior justices and submit nominations.

The justices so honored are Louis D. Brandeis, William J. Brennan, Tom C. Clark, John Marshall Harlan, Oliver Wendell Holmes, John Jay, John Marshall (the oldest high school; originally named Northside Rural High School, but later renamed to conform to the naming convention), Sandra Day O'Connor (attended the school's dedication), John Paul Stevens (also attended the school's dedication), William Howard Taft, and Earl Warren. The 12th and newest high school in the district, Sonia M. Sotomayor High School, opened on August 22, 2022. The school is named after Supreme Court Justice Sonia M. Sotomayor, who is the first woman of color, first Hispanic and first Latina to serve on the Supreme Court.

High schools (grades 9-12)
School	Established	Mascot	Colors	Additional information
Louis D. Brandeis High School	2008	Broncos	Orange & Navy	
William J. Brennan High School	2010	Bears	Gold & Black	
Tom C. Clark High School	1978	Cougars	Black & Silver	
John Marshall Harlan High School	2017	Hawks	Columbia Blue & Black	
Oliver Wendell Holmes High School	1964	Huskies	Hunter Green & Gold	
John Jay High School	1967	Mustangs	Reflex Blue & Silver	
John Marshall High School	1950	Rams	Maroon & Gray	Formerly Northside High School until 1960; National Blue Ribbon School in 1992-93
Sandra Day O'Connor High School	1998	Panthers	Navy & Vegas Gold	
Sonia Sotomayor High School	2022	Wildcats	Black, White, & Silver	
John Paul Stevens High School	2005	Falcons	Red, Black, & Silver	
William H. Taft High School	1985	Raiders	Red & White	National Blue Ribbon School in 1997-98
Earl Warren High School	2002	Warriors	Purple, Silver, & Black	

Magnet high schools
Program	Established	Campus	Additional information
Agriculture Academy High School	2001	O'Conner High School	
CAST Teach High School	2022	Stevens High School	
Communications Arts High School	1995	Taft High School	
Construction Careers Academy	2009	Warren High School	
Health Careers High School	1984		National Blue Ribbon School in 1990–91
John Jay Science and Engineering Academy	1997	Jay High School	
Marshall Law and Medical Services Magnet School	2019	Marshall High School	
Northside School of Innovation, Technology, and Entrepreneurship (NSITE) High School	2019	Holmes High School	Formerly Business Careers High School

Middle schools (grades 6-8)
School	Established	Mascot	Colors	Additional information
Dr. Joe J. Bernal Middle School	2014	Black Knights	Black & Gold	
Dolph Briscoe Middle School	2010	Bengals	Maroon & Gold	
John B. Connally Middle School	1998	Coyotes	Navy & Silver	
John M. Folks Middle School	2013	Stallions	Navy & Columbia	
Hector P. Garcia Middle School	2009	Gladiators	Black & Silver	
William P. Hobby Middle School	1971	Hawks	Purple & Gold	
William P. Hobby Magnet Middle School	2023	Hawks	Purple & Gold	Health Sciences Magnet
Wallace B. Jefferson Middle School	2007	Eagles	Navy & Silver	
Anson Jones Middle School	1970	Cougars	Black & Gold	
Anson Jones Magnet Middle School	2020	Cougars	Black & Gold	STEM Magnet
Jack C. Jordan Middle School	1993	Jaguars	Forest Green & White	
Jack C. Jordan Magnet Middle School	2025	Jaguars	Forest Green & White	Multimedia and Design Magnet
Gregory Luna Middle School	2004	Longhorns	Orange & Blue	
Pat Neff Middle School	1961	Texans	Blue & White	
E. M. Pease Middle School	1974	Bulldogs	Royal Blue & Gold	
Ed Rawlinson Middle School	2003	Patriots	Navy & Red	
Sam Rayburn Middle School	1962	Raiders	Red & Black	
Sul Ross Middle School	1966	Rebels	Green & Gold	
Earl Rudder Middle School	1982	Rangers	Red & Blue	
Coke R. Stevenson Middle School	1975	Wildcats	Red & White	National Blue Ribbon School in 1990-91
Katherine Stinson Middle School	1991	Skyhawks	Green & Royal Blue	
Katherine Stinson Magnet Middle School	2026	Skyhawks	Green & Royal Blue	Sports Medicine Magnet
Joe Straus III Middle School	2021	Mavericks	Royal Blue, Black, & Gray	
Robert L. Vale Middle School	2008	Stingrays	Purple & Black	
H.B. Zachry Middle School	1985	Wolverines	Red & Black	
H.B. Zachry Magnet Middle School	2021	Wolverines	Red & Black	Cybersecurity and Global Communications Magnet

Elementary schools (grades PK-5)
School	Established	Additional information
Adams Hill	1972	
Allen	1960	
Aue	2007	
Beard	2003	
Behlau	2010	
Blattman	2003	
Boldt	2015	
Boone	1974	
Brauchle	1990	National Blue Ribbon School in 1998-99
Braun Station	1982	
Burke	2000	
Cable	1958	
Carnahan	2008	
Carson	1998	
Chumbley	2024	
Ed Cody	1982	
Cole	2016	
Colonies North	1966	
Carlos Coon	1978	
Ellison	2014	
Driggers	2007	
Elrod	1988	
Esparza	1972	National Blue Ribbon School in 2000-01
Evers	1992	
Fernandez	1990	
Fields	2016	
Fisher	2006	
Forester	2008	
Franklin	2013	
Galm	1987	
Glass	1956	
Glenn	1962	
Glenoaks	1961	National Blue Ribbon School in 1998-99
Hatchett	2004	
Helotes	1950	
Henderson	2010	
Hoffmann	2009	
Howsman	1969	National Blue Ribbon School in 2000-01
Kallison	2017	
Knowlton	1985	
Krueger	2005	
Kuentz	2009	
Langley	2009	
Leon Springs	1991	
Leon Valley	1980	
Lewis	2001	
Lieck	2011	
Linton	1980	
Locke Hill	1975	National Blue Ribbon School in 1998-99
Los Reyes	2012	
Martin	2010	
Mary Hull	1963	National Blue Ribbon School in 1996-97
May	1997	
McAndrew	2013	
McDermott	1992	
Mead	2006	
Meadow Village	1968	
Michael	1999	
Mireles	2011	
Mora	2018	
Murnin	2006	
Myers	1997	
Nichols	2002	
Northwest Crossing	1982	
Oak Hills Terrace	1968	
Ott	2004	
Passmore	1970	
Powell	1962	
Raba	2000	
Reed	2023	
Rhodes	2002	
Scarborough	2008	
Scobee	1987	
Steubing	1997	
Thornton	1989	
Timberwilde	1980	
Tomlinson	2021	
Valley Hi	1963	
Villarreal	1968	
Wanke	2006	
Ward	2003	
Wernli	2020	
Westwood Terrace	1961	

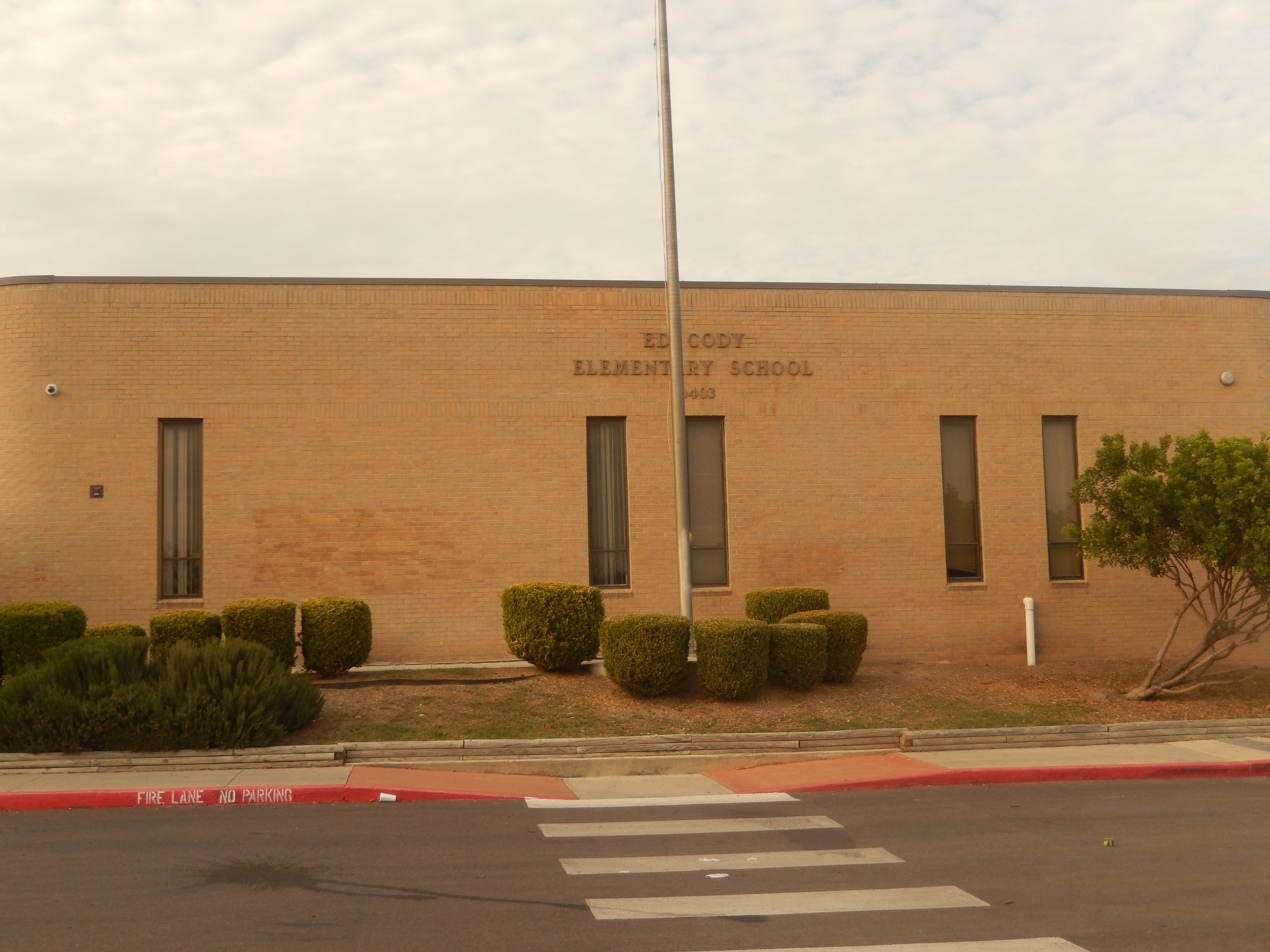
Ed Cody Elementary School, which opened in 1982 and is located at 10403 Dugas Drive adjacent to Fillmore Street, is named for Edmund D. Cody, the NISD superintendent from 1965 to 1982.

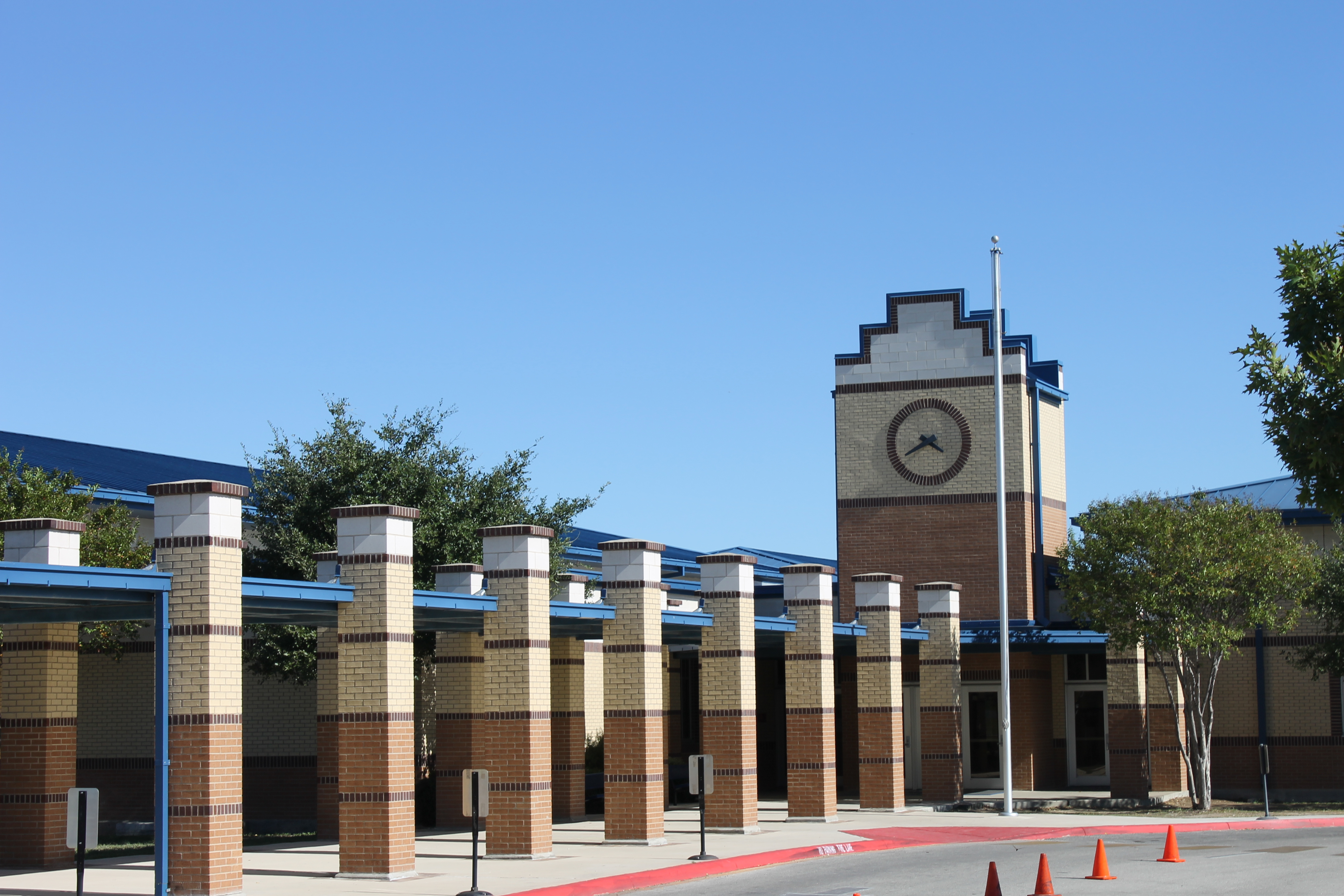
Thomas L. Hatchett Sr. Elementary School at 10700 Ingram Road in San Antonio was named in 2005 for an African-American educator (1932-2003) and native of Navasota, Texas, who began his teaching career after retiring in 1971 from the United States Air Force.

Alternative schools
School
Irene L. Chavez Excel Academy
John C. Holmgreen Center
John Jay Early College High School
Nellie M. Reddix Center
Northside Alternative High School
Northside Alternative Middle School
Northside Learning Center (adult education)
Northside Learning Center (community education)

== Student locator project ==
The school district spent over $500,000 on a system whereby students wear an RFID chip and barcode around their necks, allowing the school to track their locations during the school day. The students needed the tag "to use the library or cafeteria, vote in school elections, and in some cases for toilet breaks". One student was expelled in 2012 after refusing to either wear the tag or to wear a version of it that included the barcode but not the RFID tag. Her objections were for reasons of religion, privacy, and freedom of expression; the school had also forbidden her from handing out leaflets criticizing the program. She later returned to the school following a federal judge's injunction. The school district's website was brought down in retaliation for the program. An individual claiming responsibility for the website disruption described the school district as "pervs" for their policy of RFID tracking children.

The RFID tracking program was discontinued for the 2013-2014 school year. Even during the controversy, the program was very limited in scope. The schools chosen had the fewest ratio white students (Jones M.S. - 4% and John Jay H.S. -13%).

== Police department ==
The Northside ISD Police Department is the district's full-service police department. The department has jurisdiction in the district's boundaries and has primary jurisdiction over all district property regardless of county.

=== Incidents ===
- On September 11, 2007, NISD police officer Patrick Ritchey reported that he was shot twice through his bulletproof vest with his own pistol after confronting two men after seeing graffiti at Lackland City Elementary School (now Allen Elementary). Following an overnight search by the San Antonio Police Department for the suspects, Ritchey admitted that he shot himself.
- On May 16, 2012, NISD police officer Doug Schramm negligently discharged his pistol in his office at Jordan Middle School. Schramm immediately informed the NISD police chief and campus principal, and it was found that the bullet did not leave the office. He was put on administrative leave and later fired on May 29 for unholstering a gun inside the school.
- In August 2016, Texas Commission on Law Enforcement investigators recommended criminal charges against NISD Police Chief Charles Carnes and suspension of his peace officer license for falsely stating that NISD officers do not make routine traffic stops and failing to submit the required racial profiling reports for years.

==== Shooting of Derek Lopez ====
On November 12, 2010, Northside ISD police officer Daniel Alvarado shot and killed 14-year-old student Derek Lopez. Alvarado witnessed Lopez punch another student at a bus stop and pursued him, then radioed his supervisor, who instructed him to stay with the victim. Alvarado returned to his car and ordered the victim into his car and pursued Lopez. Lopez jumped over fences, then closed himself in a backyard shed. Alvarado approached the shed with his pistol drawn, and when Lopez opened the door, Alvarado fired one round. Alvarado claimed he feared for his life and that Lopez was charging for his weapon or had taken a weapon from the shed.

Alvarado had been reprimanded at 12 times and suspended four times prior to the incident and on May 29, 2008, the NISD Police Department considered his termination. He resigned in January 2013, and later that year, Northside ISD settled the federal lawsuit brought against it by Lopez's mother for $925,000.

== History ==
The district was formed in 1949 via consolidation of several rural school districts, having a mere 823 students:

- Clifton
- Culebra
- Helotes (including the former Los Reyes district which Helotes absorbed in 1939)
- Hoffman
- Leon Springs
- Leon Valley (including the former Evers district which Leon Valley absorbed in 1924)
- Locke Hill
- Lockhart
- Mackey
- San Antonio Heights

== See also ==
- List of school districts in Texas
- List of people from San Antonio
