= Earl Warren High School =

Secondary school in Texas, United States

Location
- 9411 Military Drive West; San Antonio, (Bexar County), Texas 78251; United States; 29.463757°N 98.669790°W

Information
- School type: Public, high school
- Established: 2002
- School district: Northside Independent School District
- Superintendent: John Craft
- NCES School ID: 483312009134
- Principal: Melissa Hurst
- Faculty: 152.00 (on an FTE basis)
- Grades: 9–12
- Enrollment: 2,605 (2023–2024)
- Student to teacher ratio: 17.14
- Colors: Purple and silver
- Athletics conference: UIL Class AAAAAA
- Mascot: Warriors
- Sports District: 28-6A
- Feeder Middle Schools: Connally Middle School; Jordan Middle School; Zachry Middle School
- Website: Official Website

Earl Warren High School is a public school located in San Antonio, Texas, United States. It is a part of the Northside Independent School District. As with all Northside ISD high schools, it is named for a former United States Supreme Court justice - in this case, former Chief Justice Earl Warren. When the school opened, the Warren family donated the robe worn by Earl Warren during the historic Brown v. Board of Education case. The robe is displayed in the school’s front office.

For the 2024-2025 school year, the school was given a "C" by the Texas Education Agency, with a distinction for Top 25% Percent Comparative Academic Growth.

In 2006, the Warren Academic Decathlon team made it to the Texas state competition for the first time. In 2025, the team became the first from San Antonio in 31 years to be crowned the Texas Academic Decathlon Overall State Champion, reaching third place at the National level.

Northside ISD magnet school Construction Careers Academy was founded in 2009 with an academic focus on construction-related skills, and is located on the Warren campus.

On Friday, November 4, 2005, only about 400 of Warren's 3,000 students attended school for the entire day due to threatening messages posted on MySpace; specifically that “two boys were planning to show up at school with guns." The four students who posted the messages on the web site were identified by administrators as “current students of Warren High School”, and faced felony charges, including making terroristic threats and disruption of a high school campus.

== Athletics ==
The Warren Warriors baseball and football teams made it to the playoffs in 2006 for the first time in school history. In 2008 the football team went (9-3) and won the first district championship (28-5A) in school history.

=== Soccer ===
The boys varsity soccer team made it to the playoffs five years in a row after 2006, and made it to the regional tournament in 2006 and 2009, taking down one of the best teams in the Northeast Independent School District, Churchill. The soccer team went undefeated in 2007 before losing to Lee in the second round of playoffs. In 2011 the soccer team took down the number one ranked Reagan Rattlers in the area playoffs, and then beat the Cibolo-Steele Knights in the regional quarterfinals.

== Notable alumni ==
- Tony Crocker (Class of 2005) – professional basketball player
- Dennis Houston (Class of 2017), professional football player in the NFL
- Marcus Keene (Class of 2013) – professional basketball player
- Darryl Morris (Class of 2008) – professional football player in the NFL
- Taurean Prince (Class of 2012) – professional basketball player in the NBA
- Maxi Rodriguez (Class of 2013) – professional soccer player for Detroit City FC
- Stanley Umude (Class of 2017), professional basketball player in the NBA
- Ben Uzoh (Class of 2006) – professional basketball player in the NBA and in foreign leagues
