= Louis D. Brandeis High School =

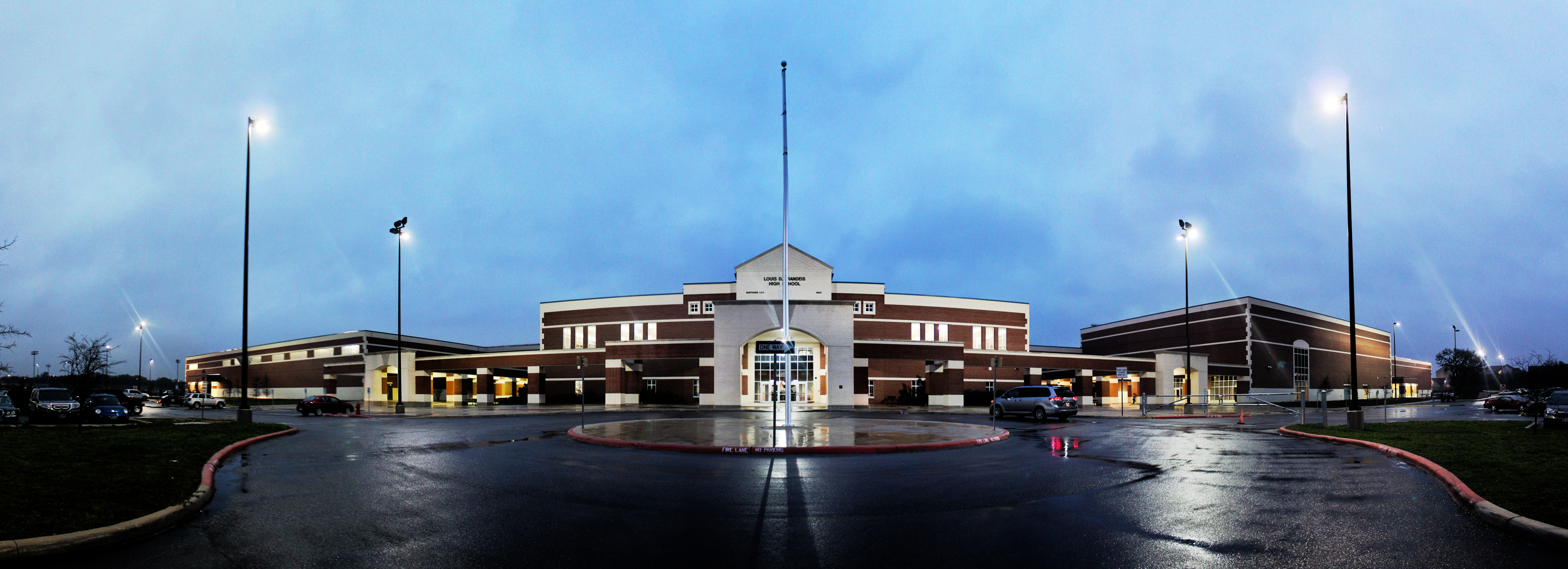
- Front panoramic view of Brandeis High School

Location
- 13011 Kyle Seale Parkway; San Antonio, Bexar County, Texas 78249; United States; 29.565452°N 98.646286°W

Information
- School type: Public, high school
- Established: 2008
- Locale: City: Large
- School district: Northside ISD
- NCES School ID: 483312011431
- Principal: Dana Gilbert-Perry
- Staff: 156.21 (on an FTE basis)
- Grades: 9–12
- Enrollment: 2,727 (2023–2024)
- Student to teacher ratio: 17.46
- Colors: Orange and navy
- Athletics conference: UIL AAAAAA
- Mascot: Bronco
- Feeder Middle Schools: Garcia MS; Stinson MS
- Feeder Elementary Schools: Aue; Beard; Carnahan; Ellison; Leon Springs; May; Scobee; Stuebing; Wanke
- Website: Brandeis High School website

Louis D. Brandeis High School is a public high school located in San Antonio, Texas (USA). It is part of the Northside Independent School District located in northwest Bexar County. All comprehensive high schools in the Northside Independent School District (NISD) are named for US Supreme Court Justices, in this case for Justice Louis D Brandeis. For the 2024-25 school year, the school was given a "B" by the Texas Education Agency, with distinctions for Academic Achievement in Science and Comparative Academic Growth.

Brandeis serves the Cross Mountain census-designated place.

== Extracurricular activities ==
The school has Cross Country, Volleyball, Football, Basketball, JROTC, Swimming, Water Polo, Golf, Tennis, Track, Softball, Baseball, Soccer, Choir, Orchestra, Band and Bowling available as activities. National Honor Society (NHS), is a program also available to students who qualify based on grades, extra-curricular activities, service, and leadership.

The Broncos have a robotics team that competes in the FIRST Robotics Competition and FIRST Tech Challenge. The Bronc Botz robotics competition team includes four teams: FRC 3481, FTC 4602, FTC 4008, FTC 6976 and have been to the FIRST Championship in the past three years in St. Louis, Missouri.

Recently, the Brandeis Orchestra entered the TMEA Honors Orchestra competition, ranking 11th overall in the state. In 2012, Brandeis submitted a recording of two selections to the international Midwest Clinic in Chicago, and was one of four chamber ensembles selected to perform there in December 2013. In 2018, the Brandeis Orchestra was invited and played at the prestigious Carnegie Hall.

== Air Force Junior Reserve Officer Training Corps (AFJROTC) ==
Brandeis High School's AFJROTC Program (TX-20083) has won several national and regional awards. The Blue Aces Unarmed Drill Team won the title of 2015 Nationals Champions.
