= John Marshall Harlan High School (Texas) =

Coordinates: 29.5156°N 98.7796°W

John M. Harlan High School

Location
- 14350 Culebra Rd. San Antonio, Bexar County, Texas 78253; United States

Information
- Motto: "Soaring together, achieving new heights."
- Opened: 2017
- Locale: Rural: Fringe
- School district: Northside ISD
- NCES School ID: 483312012985
- Principal: Travis Weissler
- Faculty: 139.56 (on an FTE basis)
- Grades: 9–12
- Enrollment: 2,458 (2023–2024)
- Student to teacher ratio: 17.61
- Colors: Black and Columbia blue
- Mascot: Hawks
- Feeder schools: Bernal MS, Straus MS
- Website: https://nisd.net/harlan/

John Marshall Harlan High School is the eleventh public high school in the Northside Independent School District of San Antonio, Texas and classified as a 6A school by the University Interscholastic League. During 2022–2023, Harlan High School had an enrollment of 2,532 students and a student to teacher ratio of 17.12. The school received an overall rating of "B" from the Texas Education Agency for the 2024–2025 school year.

It is named after U.S. Supreme Court justice John Marshall Harlan. It is NISD's 11th comprehensive high school. The 486,000-square-foot (45,200 m^{2}) building, with a cost of $110 million, is NISD's largest school campus. It opened on August 28, 2017.

== Notable alumni ==
- Tate Taylor (sprinter), track and field athlete
