= List of people from San Antonio =

Below follows a list of notable people from the metropolitan area of San Antonio, Texas.

== Politics ==
- Glenn A. Abbey, U.S. diplomat
- Hope Andrade, secretary of state of Texas
- William P. Atkinson, Wisconsin state assemblyman
- Claude W. Black Jr., Baptist minister, civil rights leader, city councilman and mayor pro tempore
- Augustus Belknap, Union Army officer, railway executive, and city alderman
- Bill Blythe, member of the Texas House of representatives
- Mario Cantu, Chicano activist
- Julian Castro, U.S. secretary of housing and urban development; mayor of San Antonio; San Antonio city councilman; brother of U.S. Representative Joaquin Castro
- Joaquin Castro, U.S. representative from Texas's 35th congressional district since 2013; member of the Texas House; brother of San Antonio Mayor Julian Castro
- Henry E. Catto Jr., ambassador to the United Kingdom
- John Cornyn, U.S. senator since 2002; attended Trinity University and St. Mary's University Law School in San Antonio
- Dwight D. Eisenhower, 34th president of the United States; stationed at Fort Sam Houston in 1916
- Rick Galindo, member of the Texas House of Representatives from Bexar County; born in 1981 and reared in San Antonio
- Alberto Gonzales, U.S. Attorney General under President George W. Bush
- Tony Gonzales, U.S. representative for Texas
- Henry B. Gonzalez, U.S. representative for Texas's 20th congressional district, the Henry B. Gonzalez Convention Center in San Antonio is named in his honor
- John W. Goode, attorney and Republican politician; lost the 1961 special election for Congress to Henry B. Gonzalez
- Maria L. de Hernández, Mexican-American rights activist
- Barbara Hervey, Place 7 judge of the Texas Court of Criminal Appeals
- Rita Jenrette, wife of U.S. Congressman John W. Jenrette Jr., of South Carolina, posed for Playboy magazine in 1981
- Lyndon B. Johnson, 36th President of the United States, retired to San Antonio
- Cyndi Taylor Krier, state senator and Bexar County administrative judge
- Lyle Larson, member of the Texas House of Representatives 2011–2023; member of the San Antonio City Council 1991–1995
- Robert N. Lemen, Minnesota state legislator and businessman
- Ruth Jones McClendon, member of the Texas House of Representatives and City Council member 1993–1996
- Tom Mechler, former Texas Republican Party state chairman
- Susan Pamerleau, retired United States Air Force major general and the Republican sheriff of Bexar County, first woman elected, 2012
- Brad Parscale, political strategist and founder of Giles–Parscale; Washington Post stated that he could "justifiably take credit" for Donald Trump's 2016 victory
- Francisco Antonio Ruíz, alcalde and city alderman 1836–1841
- Joe Sage, member of the Texas House of Representatives from Bexar County, 1973–1975
- Mario Marcel Salas, city councilman for District 2, Judson Independent School District vice president
- William S. Sessions, former FBI director 1987–1993; longtime attorney for the Russian Mafia's "Boss of Bosses" Semion Mogilevich
- Sally Shelton-Colby, ambassador of the United States to Barbados, Grenada and Dominica; minister to St. Lucia, 1979–1981, under Jimmy Carter
- John Thomas Steen Jr., San Antonio lawyer and 108th secretary of state of Texas
- G. J. Sutton, state representative, first black elected official in Texas
- Lou Nelle Sutton, wife of G. J. Sutton; succeeded him in the Texas House
- Percy Sutton, Manhattan borough president in New York City; civil rights attorney with such high-profile clients as Malcolm X; owner of the Apollo Theater in Harlem and several radio stations
- Susan Weddington, former Texas State Republican Party chairman
- Jeff Wentworth, state senator from San Antonio; unseated in 2012 by Donna Campbell
- John H. Wood Jr., federal judge in San Antonio until 1979, when he was assassinated by convicted murderer-for-hire Charles Harrelson, father of actor Woody Harrelson
- John C. Woods, executioner of the Nuremberg Trials; master sergeant in United States Army

=== Notable mayors ===
- Gina Ortiz Jones, 2025–present
- Ron Nirenberg, 2017–2025
- Ivy Taylor, 2014–2017
- Julián Castro, 2009–2014, 16th U.S. secretary of housing and urban development under President Barack Obama
- Phil Hardberger, 2005–2009
- Edward D. Garza 2001–2005
- Howard Peak, 1997–2001
- Bill Thornton 1995–1997
- Nelson Wolff, 1991–1995
- Henry Cisneros, 1981–1989, secretary of HUD under President of the United States Bill Clinton
- Lila Cockrell, 1976–1981, 1989–1991
- Maury Maverick Sr., 1939–1941
- Bryan Callaghan Jr., 1885–1892, 1897–1899, 1905–1912
- Francois P. Giraud, 1872–1875
- Wilhelm Carl August Thielepape, 1867–1872
- Daniel Cleveland, 1861–1865
- Juan Seguin, 1841–1842
- Sam Maverick, 1839–1840
- Antonio Menchaca, 1838–1839
- William H. Daingerfield, 1838
- John William Smith, 1837–1838, 1840–1841, 1842–1844

== Artists ==
- Kim Bishop, visual artist
- Bryan Willis Hamilton, music producer
- Mari Hernandez, photographer
- Carl Hoppe
- Deborah Kass, painter
- Austin Mahone, singer
- Martha Mood, tapestry, ceramic, photography
- Julian Onderdonk, landscape painter
- Al Rendon, photographer
- Porfirio Salinas
- Pendleton Ward, creator of cartoon Adventure Time
- Todd White, former lead character designer for SpongeBob SquarePants (John Marshall High School)
- Verner Moore White

== Architects ==
- O'Neil Ford (1905–1982), nationally renowned architect; only individual ever to be declared a national landmark (1974)
- Alfred Giles (1853–1920), designed many historic homes and courthouses, including the Pershing House
- Robert H.H. Hugman (1902–1980), civil engineer; saved San Antonio after 1921 floods; designed River Walk (1922–38); astute urban planner, indefatigable prophet of civic rebirth
- David Lake, founding partner of Lake|Flato architects

== Astronauts ==
- John E. Blaha, retired United States Air Force colonel, former NASA astronaut, veteran of five space missions aboard the Space Shuttle and Mir
- David Scott, NASA astronaut who flew on Gemini 8, Apollo 9, and, as commander of the Apollo 15 Moon mission, became the seventh man to walk on the Moon
- Ed White, NASA astronaut who flew on Gemini 4, when he became the first American spacewalker, and was set to fly on Apollo 1, but died in an accident during a plugs-out test

== Film and television ==
- Poni Adams, actress
- Gil Birmingham, Comanche actor (Twilight film series)
- Dustin Lance Black, screenwriter (Milk)
- Pat Boyette, KENS-TV news anchor, comic book artist, actor, composer, film director
- Lara Flynn Boyle, actress (Twin Peaks), married San Antonio businessman Donald Ray Thomas in 2006
- Paul Briggs, animator (Big Hero 6: The Series, Zootopia , and Frozen)
- Carol Burnett, Emmy Award-winning actress and comedian
- Wendell Burton, actor (The Sterile Cuckoo)
- Cass Ole (d. 1993), Arabian stallion from films The Black Stallion and The Black Stallion Returns; buried at his owner's home in San Antonio
- Hilary Duff, actress (Lizzie McGuire, Agent Cody Banks, Cheaper by the Dozen) author and singer
- Elizabeth Chambers, TV personality, founder of BIRD Bakery
- Ricardo Antonio Chavira, actor (Desperate Housewives)
- Jessica Collins, actress (Heroes)
- Joan Crawford (1904–1977), Academy Award-winning film actress (Mildred Pierce)
- David Cruz (journalist), news anchor, radio host, and spokesperson for LULAC
- Madison Davenport, actress (Sharp Objects, From Dusk till Dawn: The Series)
- Dayna Devon, TV presenter
- Ignacio Estrada, ventriloquist
- Jade Esteban Estrada, actor, comedian
- Al Freeman, Jr., Emmy Award-nominated actor (One Life to Live)
- Thomas Gibson, actor (Dharma & Greg, Criminal Minds)
- Summer Glau, actress (Firefly)
- Nicholas Gonzalez, actor (Resurrection)
- Pedro Gonzalez-Gonzalez, actor (Rio Bravo)
- Jackie Earle Haley, Academy Award-nominated actor (Little Children)
- Armie Hammer, actor (Call Me by Your Name)
- Jim Hill, sportscaster
- Ann Harding, actress
- Stephen Herek, director
- Daisy and Violet Hilton, British-born conjoined twins (Freaks)
- iDubbbz, YouTuber
- Coffeezilla, YouTuber and investigator
- Tommy Lee Jones, Academy Award-winning actor; his ex-wife Kimberlea Moser is the daughter of San Antonio's former mayor, Phil Hardberger
- Jonathan Joss, actor (King of the Hill)
- Callie Khouri, Academy Award-winning screenwriter (Thelma and Louise)
- Katie Leclerc, actress (Switched at Birth)
- Jim Lehrer, anchor of PBS NewsHour
- Hal LeSueur, actor; brother of Joan Crawford
- Chris Marrou, TV personality and news anchor at KENS
- Bruce McGill, actor (MacGyver, National Lampoon's Animal House)
- Ashley Austin Morris, actress (The New Electric Company)
- Marcia Nasatir, film producer and executive
- Pola Negri, silent-film actress
- John Allen Nelson, actor (24)
- Derek Lee Nixon, actor (When in Rome)
- Oliver North, Fox News commentator and presenter, Marine colonel who assisted opponents of Nicaragua's Sandinista government
- Norah O'Donnell, CBS News correspondent
- Jared Padalecki, actor (Gilmore Girls, Supernatural)
- Fred Parker Jr., actor (The Best Man, I Saw the Light)
- Pedro Pascal, actor (Narcos, The Last of Us)
- Scott Pelley, broadcast journalist and author
- Grace Phipps, actress (Fright Night (2011), The Nine Lives of Chloe King (2011), The Vampire Diaries (2012), Teen Beach Movie (2013), and Teen Beach 2 (2015))
- Ann Prentiss, actress, died in prison
- Paula Prentiss, actress (The Stepford Wives, What's New Pussycat?), wife of actor-director Richard Benjamin and sister of Ann Prentiss
- John Quiñones (born 1952), TV journalist and presenter
- Sendhil Ramamurthy, actor (Heroes)
- Kevin Reynolds, film director and screenwriter (Robin Hood: Prince of Thieves)
- Emilio Rivera, actor (Lie to Me)
- James Roday Rodriguez, actor (Psych)
- Michelle Rodriguez, actress (Lost)
- Robert Rodríguez, film director (Spy Kids)
- Jayne Walton Rosen, entertainer with Lawrence Welk
- Karen Sharpe, actress and wife of producer-director Stanley Kramer
- Ginny Sims, singer with Kay Kyser orchestra (1938–1942)
- Kim Spradlin, television personality; winner of Survivor: One World
- Andy Stahl (born 1952), actor
- Robert Stanton (born 1963), actor
- Henry Thomas, actor (Gangs of New York, E.T. the Extra-Terrestrial)
- Kathy Vara, TV journalist
- Pendleton Ward, creator of Adventure Time, Bravest Warriors and The Midnight Gospel
- Peter Weller, actor (RoboCop, Star Trek Into Darkness)
- Noël Wells, actress (Star Trek: Lower Decks, Mr. Roosevelt)

== Scientists and academics ==
- Michael Brame, professor of linguistics
- Elsa Salazar Cade, educator, entomologist
- Robert Cade, medical doctor and inventor of Gatorade
- William H. Cade, insect behaviorist, cricket expert
- Daniel Dumitru, physiatrist and electromyographer; born in San Antonio
- Thomas Callister Hales, mathematician, born in San Antonio
- Maria Hernandez Ferrier, former president of Texas A&M University–San Antonio; former advisor to the United States secretary of education on bilingual education
- Forrest Mims, amateur scientist, educator, engineer, author
- William Esco Moerner, Nobel Prize winner in Chemistry
- Marie Charlotte Schaefer, physician
- Cynthia Teniente-Matson, president of Texas A&M University–San Antonio

== Athletics ==
=== Baseball ===
- Gary Bell, 12-year MLB pitcher; four-time All-Star, one World Series appearance

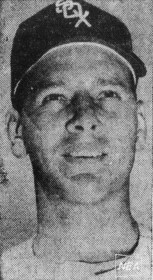
Joe Horlen

- Randy Choate, MLB relief pitcher
- Alva Jo Fischer, All-American Girls Professional Baseball League player inducted into the San Antonio Sports Hall of Fame and the Texas Baseball Hall of Fame
- Cito Gaston,12-year MLB outfielder; one All-Star game; managed Toronto Blue Jays for 12 seasons, including consecutive World Series championships (1992–93); first African-American manager to win WS title; elected to Canada's BB HOF (2002)
- Jerry Grote, MLB, New York Mets World Series catcher and two-time All-Star catcher
- Bob Heise, MLB player for the Mets, Giants, Brewers, Cardinals, Angels, Red Sox and Royals
- Joe Horlen, MLB All-Star pitcher for Chicago White Sox and Oakland A's
- Cliff Johnson, MLB catcher
- Davey Johnson, former professional baseball player and manager; Manager of the 1986 World Series Champion New York Mets
- Josh Jung, MLB player for the Texas Rangers
- Brandon Larson, MLB player for the St. Louis Cardinals
- Boone Logan (born in Helotes), MLB pitcher for the Yankees, White Sox and Braves
- Jeff Manship, MLB player for the Minnesota Twins
- Jack Neely, MLB pitcher for the Chicago Cubs
- Frank Snyder, MLB World Series champion Catcher for New York Giants
- Ross Youngs, native of Shiner, TX but grew up in San Antonio; played for NY Giants under legendary manager John McGraw; ten seasons (1917–26), two World Series titles (1921–22), .322 lifetime BA; died 1927, age 30; elected to BB HOF, 1972; only San Antonian enshrined at Cooperstown

=== Basketball ===
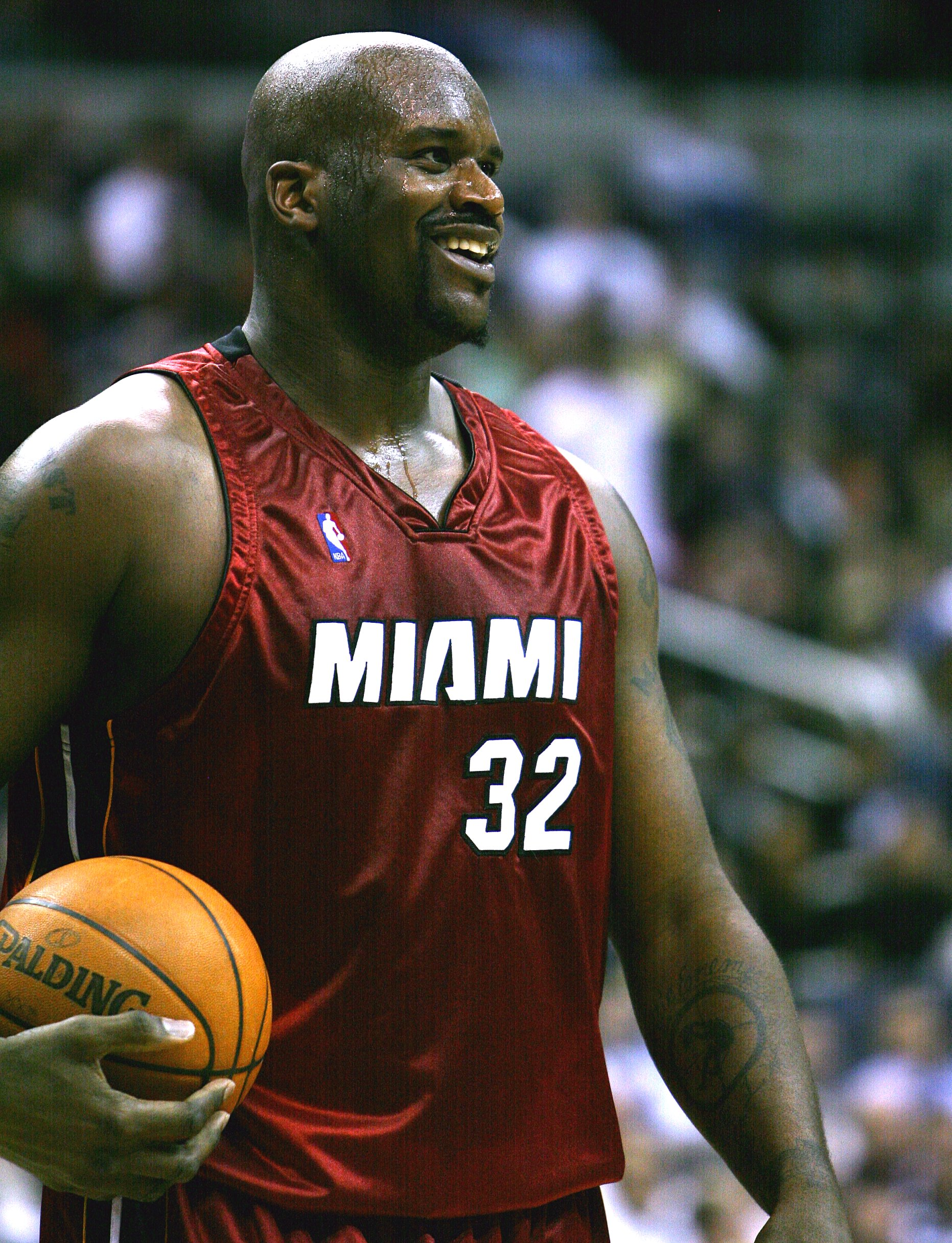
Shaquille O'Neal

- Devin Brown, shooting guard, who played for several NBA teams from 2002 to 2010, including the NBA World Champion San Antonio Spurs in 2005; graduated from South San Antonio West Campus High School and UTSA
- Jordan Clarkson, guard, currently plays for the New York Knicks, graduated from Karen Wagner High School
- Eric Dawson, power forward, played for the San Antonio Spurs; graduated from Sam Houston High School
- Fennis Dembo, forward, played for the NBA world champion Detroit Pistons in 1989 and graduated from Fox Tech High School
- Keith Edmonson, forward, played for several NBA teams in 1982–83 and graduated from Douglas MacArthur High School
- Jeff Foster, center, Indiana Pacers, since 1999 and who graduated from James Madison High School
- Askia Jones, guard, played for the Minnesota Timberwolves, graduated from John Marshall High School
- Wesley Matthews, guard, who played for the Portland Trail Blazers, Utah Jazz, Dallas Mavericks, Indiana Pacers, and the Milwaukee Bucks
- Eduardo Nájera, forward, who played for several NBA teams between 2000 and 2012; graduated from Cornerstone Christian Academy in 1996
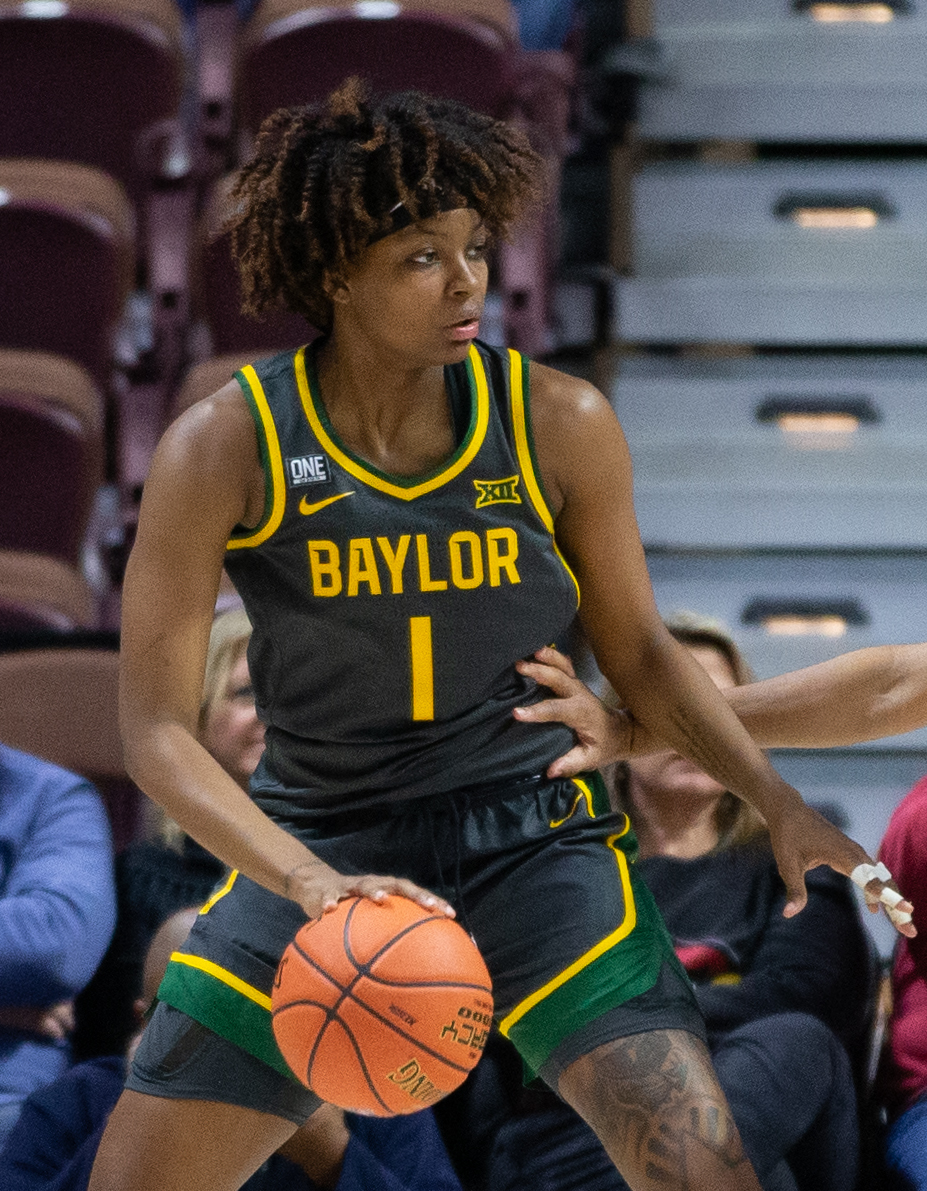
- NaLyssa Smith
  Shaquille O'Neal, center, Basketball Hall of Famer, graduated from Robert G. Cole High School, Fort Sam Houston, after leading his team to a 36–0 record and state championship; four-time NBA champion with the Los Angeles Lakers and the Miami Heat
- Ike Ofoegbu (born 1984), American-Nigerian Israeli Premier Basketball League player
- Bo Outlaw, forward, played for several NBA teams between 1994 and 2006, graduated from John Jay High School
- Trent Plaisted, forward, drafted 46th overall in the 2008 NBA draft, plays overseas for K.K. Zadar in Croatia; graduated from Tom Clark High School
- André Roberson, guard/forward, who played for the Oklahoma City Thunder and Brooklyn Nets, graduated from Karen Wagner High School
- Chris Ross, point guard, 12x PBA Champion, graduated from John Jay High School
- Taurean Prince, forward for the Detroit Pistons, graduated from Earl Warren High School
- NaLyssa Smith, power forward for the Las Vegas Aces, winner of the Wade Trophy for 2020–21, graduated from East Central High School
- Stanley Umude, forward, who played for the Detroit Pistons, Milwaukee Bucks, and San Antonio Spurs; graduated from Earl Warren High School in 2017
- Ben Uzoh, guard for the Cleveland Cavaliers and New Jersey Nets; graduated from Earl Warren High School in 2006
- Kiana Williams, guard for the Seattle Storm

=== Boxing ===
- Robert Quiroga (1969–2004), IBF super flyweight champion, 1990–93
- Jesse Rodriguez (born 2000), WBC super flyweight champion, 2022

=== Football ===
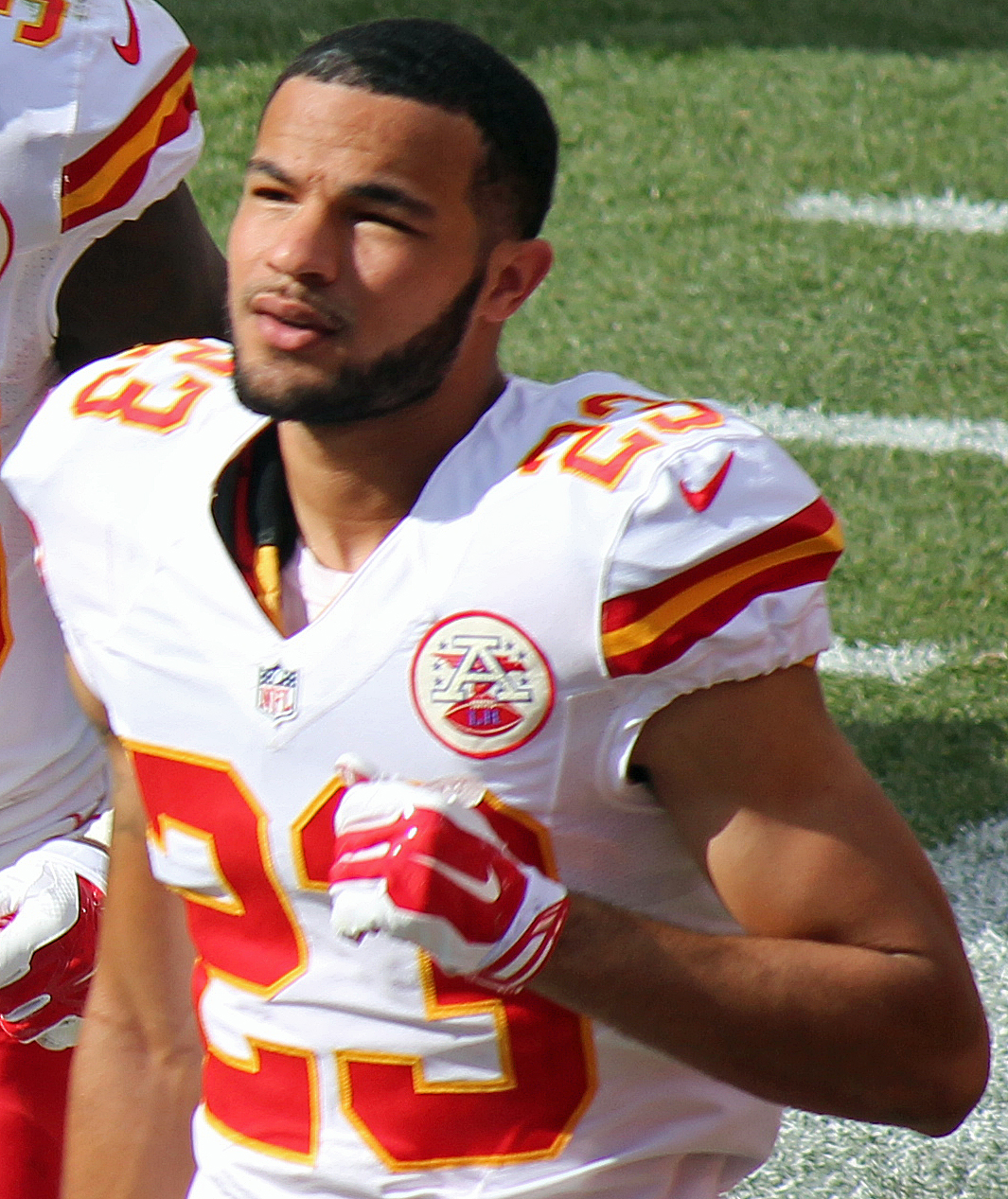
Phillip Gaines

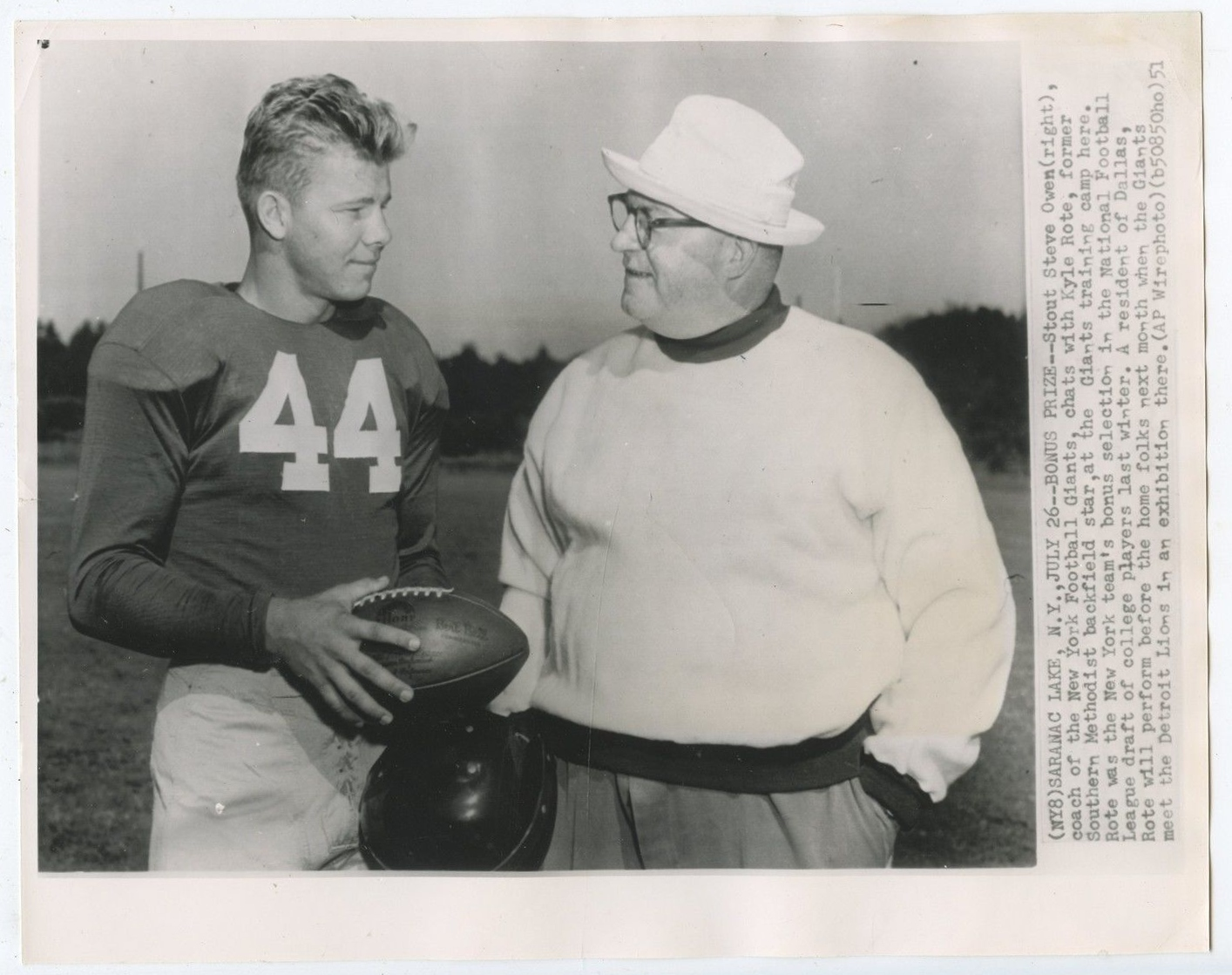
Kyle Rote

- Anthony Alabi (Antonian)
- Jace Amaro (MacArthur)
- Scott Ankrom (John Jay High School)
- Patrick Bailey (Alamo Heights High School)
- Glenn Blackwood (Churchill)
- Lyle Blackwood (Churchill)
- Chris Bordano (Southwest)
- Quincy Butler (Roosevelt)
- Cody Carlson (Churchill)
- Keith Cash (Oliver Wendell Holmes High School)
- Kerry Cash (Holmes)
- Bruce Collie (Robert E. Lee)
- Tony Darden (Holmes)
- Trey Darilek (Lee)
- Quintin Demps (Roosevelt)
- Ty Detmer (Southwest)
- Ronald Flemons (John Marshall High School)
- Erik Flowers (Roosevelt)
- Philip Gaines (Judson)
- Darryl Grant (Highlands)
- Derwin Gray (Judson)
- Gary Green (Sam Houston)
- Cedric Griffin (Holmes)
- David Hill (Highlands)
- Carlyle Holiday (Roosevelt)
- Priest Holmes (John Marshall High School)
- Moton Hopkins (Randolph High School)
- Rob Housler (Judson)
- Weldon Humble (Brackenridge)
- Sam Hurd (Brackenridge)
- A.J. Johnson (Clemens)
- Randy Johnson (Sam Houston)
- N.D. Kalu (John Marshall High School)
- Wade Key (Edison)
- Clint Killough (MacArthur)
- Trevor Knight (Reagan)
- Tommy Kramer (Lee)
- Keith Lee
- Travis Lewis (Lee)
- Wane McGarity (Tom C. Clark High School)
- Warren McVea (Brackenridge)
- Primo Miller (Brackenridge)
- Willie Mitchell (Brackenridge)
- Sammy Morris (Jay)
- Kellen Mond (Reagan)
- Tommy Nobis (Jefferson)
- Joe Pawelek (Smithson Valley)
- Robert Quiroga (Holmes)
- Gabriel Rivera (Jefferson)
- Reggie Rivers (Randolph)
- Corey Robinson (San Antonio Christian)
- Aaron Ross (Fox Tech)
- Kyle Rote (Jefferson)
- Tobin Rote (Harlandale)
- Corey Sears (Judson)
- Andrew Sendejo (Smithson Valley)
- Scott Solomon (John Marshall High School)
- Jim Strong (Sam Houston High School), San Francisco 49ers, New Orleans Saints, Florida Blazers, San Antonio Wings
- Ty Summers (Reagan)
- Jim Bob Taylor (Somerset)
- Mykkele Thompson (John Paul Stevens High School)
- Michael Toudouze (East Central)
- Alex Van Pelt (Churchill)

=== Motorsports ===
- Trenton Estep
- Pato O'Ward

=== Professional bodybuilding ===
- Heather Armbrust
- Vickie Gates

=== Professional wrestling ===
- Tully Blanchard
- Lance Cade
- Shoichi Funaki
- Jose Lothario
- Shawn Michaels
- Thunder Rosa
- Dusty Wolfe

=== Shooting ===
- Keith Sanderson (born 1975), sport shooter

=== Swimming ===
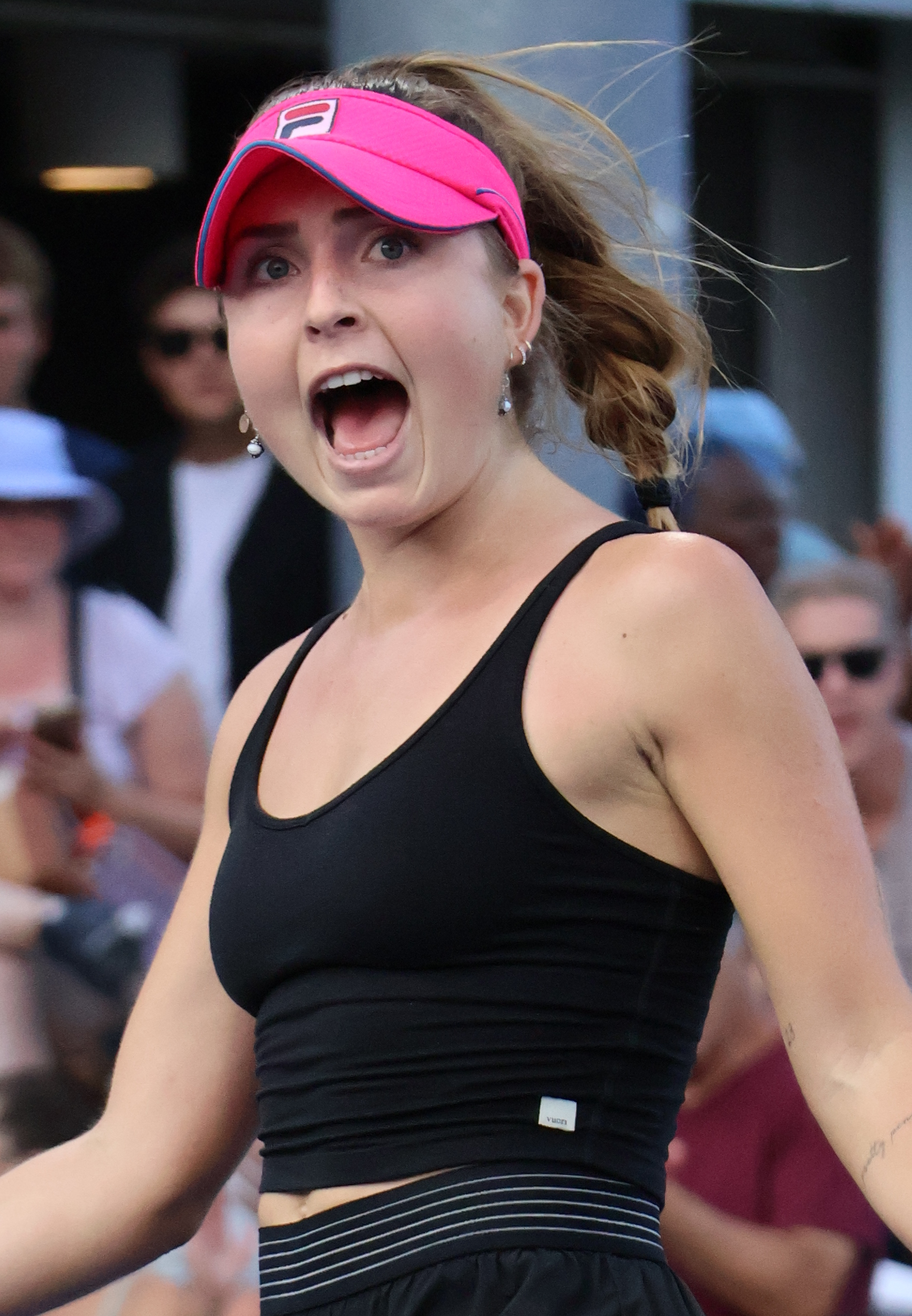
Fiona Crawley

- Josh Davis (Churchill High School), Olympic gold medalist
- Jimmy Feigen (Churchill High School), Olympic gold medalist

=== Tennis ===
- Wilmer Allison, member of International Tennis Hall of Fame
- Fiona Crawley, member of the North Carolina Tar Heels team ranked No. 1 nationally

=== Track and field ===
- Jennifer Gutierrez (Holmes), Olympic triathlete
- Anjanette Kirkland (Holmes), World Championships gold medalist in 100-meter hurdles
- Darold Williamson (Oliver Wendell Holmes High School), Olympic gold medalist in 4x400-meter relay

=== Rodeo ===
- Gene Lyda, professional bull rider from Somerset, Texas; National High School Rodeo Association champion bull rider; member of Professional Rodeo Cowboys Association; in Top 15 Bull Riders at 1967 National Finals Rodeo in Oklahoma City, Oklahoma; current partner/manager of La Escalera Ranch; son of San Antonio general contractor and rancher Gerald Lyda

=== Soccer ===
- José Arroyo, striker
- Chris Brown, defender and coach
- Matt Cardone, goalkeeper
- Chris Carrieri, forward
- Mikey Maldonado, midfielder
- Julianna Pacheco, midfielder
- Devan Tanton, defender who represented the Colombia national team

== Music ==
- Moe Bandy, country singer from San Antonio area, Lone Oak, Texas; brother of professional bull rider Mike Bandy; recorded "Bandy the Rodeo Clown" and other hits for Columbia Records; regularly performs in Branson, Missouri
- Aaron Barker, country singer-songwriter
- Ally Brooke, singer and member of girl group Fifth Harmony
- Johnny Bush, country singer, performed with Ray Price's Cherokee Cowboys and Willie Nelson's Record Men band, wrote and had a smash RCA Victor single with "Whiskey River", lives in San Antonio, wrote autobiography Whiskey River, Take My Mind
- Vikki Carr, pop and Latin singer, recorded for Liberty Records, provided background vocals for Bob Wills during his Liberty Records sessions; lives in San Antonio
- Bill Cody, host for WSM-AM morning show in Nashville; country music radio personality 1987–1994 in San Antonio at KKYX-AM, host of Great American Country's Classic Country Weekend With Bill Cody and Great American Country's Master Series
- Christopher Cross, Oscar Award-winning singer-songwriter and four-time Grammy Award winner
- Al Dean, country singer and bandleader of The All-Stars, recorded hugely popular "National Anthem of Texas", "Cotton-Eyed Joe", which is played at San Antonio Spurs basketball games
- Jessy Dixon, gospel music singer born in San Antonio, regular on Gaither Homecoming video series
- Holly Dunn, country singer-songwriter, radio personality
- Steve Earle, progressive country singer-songwriter, married to singer Allison Moorer, sister of singer Shelby Lynne
- Alejandro Escovedo, punk rock, roots rock, alternative country singer-songwriter, from a family that boasts several professional musicians
- Rosita Fernández, Tejano and conjunto musician
- Robert Fitzpatrick, actor, entertainment lawyer who managed such acts as Bee Gees, The Who, The Rolling Stones, Cream, Mitch Ryder & the Detroit Wheels, The Buckinghams, Dick Dale & the Del-Tones, Dobie Gray, Taj Majal and Peggy Lee
- Rosie Flores, rockabilly and country music artist; toured with Wanda Jackson and Asleep at the Wheel
- Pat Green, singer-songwriter of Texas music
- Gibby Haynes, founding member and lead singer of the Butthole Surfers, a popular rock band formed at Trinity University
- Tish Hinojosa, Tejano singer, recorded for A&M Records and Watermelon Records
- Adolph Hofner, country singer, toured Texas festivals, fairs and rodeos with his band The Pearl Wranglers, had daily radio program on KMAC radio, sponsored by Pearl Beer, recorded for Okeh Records
- Bobby Jarzombek, drummer for bands such as Halford, Sebastian Bach and Spastic Ink; brother of Ron Jarzombek
- Ron Jarzombek, guitarist for bands such as S.A. Slayer (San Antonio Slayer), Watchtower, Spastic Ink and Blotted Science; brother of Bobby Jarzombek
- Flaco Jiménez, Tejano and conjunto musician, accordionist, member of Texas Tornados
- T. V. John Langworthy, songwriter singer, composer, television personality, comedian and video producer
- Paul Leary, a founding member and guitarist of the Butthole Surfers, a popular rock band formed at Trinity University
- Austin Mahone, soloist singer
- Marshall Dyllon, country vocal group consisting of brothers Paul Martin and Michael Martin, Todd Sansom, Jess Littleton and Daniel Cahoon, charted three Top 50 Billboard country songs, "Live It Up" (2000), "You" (2001) and "She Ain't Gonna Cry" (2000)
- Phillip Martin III (also known as ‘Nino’, ‘Pony J’ and ‘Jake’), rapper, producer and distributor
- Jordan McCoy, American Juniors runner-up, signed with Sean (Puffy) Combs
- "Red River Dave" McEnery, hillbilly singer-songwriter, film, radio and recording star; in the early 1940s, returned to San Antonio and broadcast his songs on XERF radio located along Texas/Mexico border; appeared in several B-Western films, including 1944's Swing in the Saddle
- Megan Thee Stallion, rapper, singer-songwriter, and actress, born in San Antonio and raised in Houston
- Lydia Mendoza, Tejano and conjunto musician, first garnered fame in San Antonio
- Augie Meyers, Tex-Mex, country and rock musician, member of The Texas Tornados, founding member of the Sir Douglas Quintet, charted Top 100 Billboard solo country hit "Kap Pa So" (1988) on Atlantic-American Records, session keyboardist for Bob Dylan's Grammy-winning album of the year Time Out of Mind (1998) and its follow-up, Love and Theft (2001)
- Mina, singer, main dancer of South Korean pop group Twice; born in San Antonio and lived in Houston briefly before moving to Japan
- Michael Morales, Grammy Award-winning pop artist who had two Billboard top-40 hits in the early 1990s; graduated from San Antonio's Oliver Wendell Holmes High School
- Emilio Navaira, Grammy Award-winning Tejano music and country music singer
- Neon Indian, Chillwave music band formed at the University of North Texas by San Antonio native Alan Palomo, a graduate of Winston Churchill High School
- Michael Nesmith, singer-songwriter, member of The Monkees and co-star of their NBC-TV musical-comedy series; producer of award-winning video "Elephant Parts"; early member of band Denny Ezba and the Goldens along with Keith Allison ("Where the Action Is"; Paul McCartney lookalike bass player in Paul Revere & the Raiders), Augie Meyers and Wayne Hensley
- Offbeats, San Antonio-based garage/punk band
- Zulema Garcia Olsen, musician and composer
- Sunny Ozuna, singer for Sunny & the Sunglows
- Chris Pérez, Tejano Latin rock guitarist, married Tejano singer Selena
- Jay Perez, Tejano musician
- Ray Peterson, 1960s pop singer whose major hits included "Corrine, Corrina", "Missing You", "The Wonder of You" and "Tell Laura I Love Her" for RCA Victor Records
- Randy Piper, heavy metal guitarist best known for his work with W.A.S.P., 1982–1986
- Elida Reyna, Tejano, lead singer of Latin Grammy Award-winning band Elida Y Avante
- Emily Robison, plays banjo, dobro, guitar and vocals in Grammy Award-winning country music group the Dixie Chicks
- Robert Xavier Rodriguez, classical composer
- Mike Ryan, country music singer-songwriter
- Doug Sahm, Tex-Mex, country and rock musician, member of Texas Tornados, leader of Sir Douglas Quintet, known for "She's About a Mover" and "Mendocino"
- Mike Dimes, rapper
- Olga Samaroff, concert pianist and first wife of conductor Leopold Stokowski
- John Schneider, actor and singer, best known as Bo Duke on CBS TV series The Dukes of Hazzard, had 18 Top 100 Billboard hits on the country chart, appeared as Curley in television film Stagecoach starring Willie Nelson and Waylon Jennings; San Antonio resident
- George Strait, Grammy Award-winning country music superstar, has more than 60 No. 1 hits including "The Chair" and "All My Ex's Live in Texas"; starred in the film Pure Country, lives in San Antonio
- Kevin Talley, heavy metal drummer with bands such as Dying Fetus, Chimaira and Daath
- Ernest Tubb, singer-songwriter, inducted into Country Music Hall of Fame, member of Grand Ole Opry, lived in San Antonio in the 1940s
- Justin Tubb, singer-songwriter, member of Grand Ole Opry, son of country music legend Ernest Tubb, born in San Antonio
- Upon a Burning Body, deathcore band
- Patricia Vonne, singer, actress, sister of Robert Rodriguez
- Worldwide (Michael Parker), rapper, emcee and producer

== Writers ==
- Jacques Barzun, leading cultural historian
- Sandra Cisneros, author, lives in a purple house in the city's King William District
- Dan Cook, San Antonio sportswriter for more than 50 years
- Ron Franscell, true-crime author and journalist
- Marcus Goodrich, screenwriter and novelist
- Heloise, syndicated advice columnist, lives in suburb of Helotes
- Esther Hicks, San Antonio-based best-selling author and inspirational speaker, Law of Attraction, Ask & It Is Given, The Astonishing Power of Emotions
- Dolores Hitchens, mystery novelist
- Char Miller, local historian and environmentalist
- Andrew J. Porter, novelist and short story writer
- Steven Pruitt, Wikipedia editor
- Barbara Ras, San Antonio writer and publisher, The Last Skin, Bite Every Sorrow, One Hidden Self, and Costa Rica: A Traveler's Literary Companion
- Rick Riordan, San Antonio-based novelist, Big Red Tequila, The Last King of Texas, Southtown, Mission Road, Percy Jackson & the Olympians, The Kane Chronicles, The Heroes of Olympus, The Maze of Bones, Vespers Rising
- Rudy Ruiz, award-winning author, advocate, and social entrepreneur
- Shea Serrano, author, The Rap Year Book, Basketball (and Other Things)
- Lynn Schooler, photographer and author of The Blue Bear and Walking Home
- Naomi Shihab Nye, writer and poet
- Whitley Strieber, writer and film producer, Communion, The Hunger and Wolfen
- Light Townsend Cummins, historian and author

== Religion ==
- James T. Draper, Jr., president of the Southern Baptist Convention, 1982–1984; pastor in San Antonio in the early 1960s
- Patrick Flores (born 1929), retired Catholic archbishop of San Antonio (archbishop 1979–2004)
- José Horacio Gómez, Catholic archbishop of San Antonio
- John Hagee, televangelist and pastor of Cornerstone Church
- Cardinal William H. Keeler, born in San Antonio; archbishop of Baltimore
- Max Lucado, best-selling Christian author and pastor of the city's Oak Hills Church
- Samuel M. Stahl, rabbi emeritus of Temple Beth-El

== Billionaires ==
- Charles Butt, H-E-B
- Rodney Lewis, oil and natural gas industrialist, worth $2.8 billion
- Lowry Mays, Clear Channel Communications
- B. J. (Red) McCombs, founding partner in Clear Channel, auto dealer, and former owner of the San Antonio Spurs, Minnesota Vikings, and Denver Nuggets

== Civic leaders ==
- Ferdinand Ludwig Herff, medical pioneer
- Anna Goodman Hertzberg, founder of Tuesday Musical Club in 1901
- Herb Kelleher, chairman of Southwest Airlines
- Edith McAllister, philanthropist, a founder of the Southwest School of Art
- Robert F. McDermott, chairman emeritus of USAA
- Henry R. Muñoz III, businessman and political activist
- Graciela Sanchez, social justice activist and founder of the Esperanza Peace and Justice Center
- Emmett Schelling, transgender rights activist
- Emma Tenayuca, labor leader, union organizer, and educator; led the 1938 pecan shellers strike

== Businesspeople ==
- Tom Benson, owner of New Orleans Saints and automobile dealer
- Sardar Biglari, CEO of Biglari Holdings
- Josef Centeno, chef, restaurateur, and cookbook author
- Marisol Deluna, fashion designer
- William Greehey, founder of Valero Energy, NuStar Energy, and the Greehey Family Foundation
- Lorenzo Gomez III, entrepreneur and author
- Johnny Hernandez, chef, caterer and restaurateur
- Peter Holt, chairman of Spurs, partner in Caterpillar, Inc.
- Gerald Lyda, founder and president of Lyda Inc. and Lyda Constructors, Inc.; owner of 320,000-acre (1,300 km^{2}) La Escalera Ranch in Texas; former owner of Ladder Ranch in Sierra County, New Mexico
- John T. Montford, businessman in San Antonio since 2001; chancellor of Texas Tech University System, state senator and district attorney from Lubbock
- Sarah Newcomb Merrick, teacher, principal, writer, businessperson, homeopath
- Jeff Smisek, president and CEO of United Airlines; graduate of Roosevelt High School
- Ross Richie, CEO and founder of comic book and graphic novel publisher Boom! Studios
- Ed Whitacre, retired CEO of SBC/AT&T

== Other ==
- Rodney Alcala, serial killer; born in San Antonio
- Anderson Lee Aldrich, mass-murderer; born in San Antonio
- Johnny Avalos, serial killer; born and raised in San Antonio's Southside
- Joe Ball, murderer and possible serial killer; born in San Antonio
- Allison J. Barnett, U.S. Army major general, retired to San Antonio
- José María Jesús Carbajal, military officer in the Mexican–American War; born in San Fernando de Béxar, present-day San Antonio
- Francisco Xavier Chaves (1760–1832), former Comanche captive, negotiator of peace agreement with Comanche, Spanish soldier in San Antonio
- Mitch Clem, cartoonist and writer, lives outside San Antonio, in Kirby
- Casper H. Conrad Jr., U.S. Army brigadier general
- Mariana W. de Coronel, collector
- Davy Crockett, frontiersman; fought in the Battle of the Alamo
- James Henry Dolan, criminal
- Ivan Edwards, prior ordained minister, physiatrist, USAF Reserve flight surgeon (Lt Col), started a Child sponsorship for orphans in Uganda, community organizer
- King Fisher, rancher and gunfighter from Eagle Pass, murdered in the Vaudeville Theater Ambush in 1884
- Joseph Gottschalk, "Thong Man"
- John Q. Henion, US Army lieutenant general, born and raised in San Antonio
- Ernest Hinds, U.S. Army major general
- Jorgeous, drag performer
- Herman F. Kramer, U.S. Army major general
- Joe S. Lawrie, U.S. Army major general
- Jimmy J. Jumper, U.S. Air Force general
- Vivian Liberto, former wife of country music legend Johnny Cash; mother of Rosanne Cash
- Walter L. McCreary, U.S. Army Air Corps/U.S. Air Force officer, former prisoner of war (POW), and combat fighter pilot with the Tuskegee Airmen
- Yolanda Saldívar, former nurse president fan club and murderer of Selena
- Charles Schreiner III, rancher
- Deaf Smith, frontiersman noted for his part in the Texas Revolution and the Army of the Republic of Texas, died in Richmond, Texas in 1837
- Thomas M. Watlington, US Army major general, born in San Antonio

== See also ==
- List of University of the Incarnate Word people
