= Somerset High School =

Somerset High School may refer to:

- Somerset Area High School in Somerset Township, Somerset County, Pennsylvania
- Somerset Berkley Regional High School in Somerset, Massachusetts
- Somerset High School (Bellflower, California) in Bellflower, California
- Somerset High School (Kentucky) in Somerset, Kentucky
- Somerset High School (Texas) in Somerset, Texas
- Somerset High School (Wisconsin) in Somerset, Wisconsin
