= John Jay (disambiguation) =

John Jay (1745–1829), was an American Founding Father, politician, statesman, revolutionary, diplomat, and the first Chief Justice of the United States.

John Jay may also refer to:

== People ==
- John Clarkson Jay (1808–1891), physician and grandson of John Jay, the American Founding Father and statesman
- John Jay (lawyer) (1817–1894), American diplomat and lawyer, grandson of John Jay, the American Founding Father and statesman
- John Jay (builder) (1805–1888), British stonemason and builder in the nineteenth century
- John Jay (filmmaker) (1915–2000), American ski filmmaker
- Jon Jay (born 1985), American baseball player

== Places ==
- John Jay College of Criminal Justice, part of the City University of New York
- John Jay Hall, part of Columbia University
- John Jay High School (disambiguation)
- John Jay Middle School

== Other ==
- John Jay Report, another name for the 2004 report titled The Nature and Scope of the Problem of Sexual Abuse of Minors by Catholic Priests and Deacons in the United States

== See also ==
- Jay John, American basketball coach
