= Somerset School District =

Somerset School District may refer to:

- Somerset Independent School District
- School District of Somerset in Wisconsin, which includes Somerset High School (Wisconsin)
