= Buentello =

Buentello is a surname of Spanish origin. Notable people bearing this surname include:

- Paul Buentello, American mixed martial artist
- Brianna Buentello, American politician
- Ruth Leonela Buentello, American Chicana artist
- G. Sofía Villa de Buentello, Mexican feminist
