= Jim Bob Taylor =

American football player (born 1959)

No. 12
- Position: Quarterback

Personal information
- Born: September 9, 1959 (age 67); San Antonio, Texas, U.S.
- Listed height: 6 ft 2 in (1.88 m)
- Listed weight: 205 lb (93 kg)

Career information
- High school: Somerset (Somerset, Texas)
- College: SMU (1978-1979); Georgia Tech (1980-1982)
- NFL draft: 1983: 11th round, 280th overall pick

Career history
- Baltimore Colts (1983); Cleveland Browns (1985)*
- * Offseason or practice squad member only

Career NFL statistics
- Passing yards: 20
- TD–INT: 0-1
- Passer rating: 45.8
- Stats at Pro Football Reference

James Robert Taylor (born September 9, 1959) is an American former professional football player who was a quarterback for the Baltimore Colts of the National Football League (NFL). He played high school football at Somerset High School and college football for the SMU Mustangs and Georgia Tech Yellow Jackets.

== College career ==
=== SMU ===
==== 1978 ====
Taylor would see his first collegiate action in 1978, when he replaced starter Mike Ford, who left with a hamstring injury, against Texas A&M. However, Taylor was not allowed to pass the ball, and Ford returned in the second half.

==== 1979 ====
Taylor took the majority of snaps in 1979. He finished with 1001 yards, 10 touchdowns, and 9 interceptions. Following the season, he transferred to Georgia Tech.

=== Georgia Tech ===
==== 1981 ====
After redshirting in 1980 due to transfer rules, Taylor did not start the 1981 season. However, he split the snaps with Mike Kelley and Stu Rogers on a 1-10 team.

==== 1982 ====
Taylor was made the starter in 1982 after Kelley left for the NFL. That year, he passed for 1839 yards, 3 touchdowns, and 12 interceptions. He finished his college career with 3137 yards, 14 touchdowns, and 26 interceptions.

== Professional career ==
=== Baltimore Colts ===
Taylor was selected in the 11th round of the 1983 NFL draft, 280th overall. His only NFL action in his entire career came in a week 2 loss against the Denver Broncos, where he attempted 2 passes; one was a 20-yard gain, and the second was an interception.

=== Cleveland Browns ===
Following a stint as a free agent in 1984, he signed with the Browns, only to be released before the regular season.

== Personal life ==
His son, Cooper Taylor, also played in the NFL.
