= Basketball (and Other Things) =

Illustrated essay collection

Basketball (and Other Things): A Collection of Questions Asked, Answered, Illustrated
- First edition
- Author: Shea Serrano
- Audio read by: Sean Crisden
- Illustrator: Arturo Torres
- Language: English
- Series: And Other Things
- Release number: 1
- Subject: Basketball
- Publisher: Abrams Image, Tantor Audio
- Media type: Print (Paperback), Audiobook
- ISBN: 978-1-4197-2647-7 (Paperback)

Basketball (and Other Things): A Collection of Questions Asked, Answered, Illustrated is a 2017 book written by Shea Serrano and illustrated by Arturo Torres, with a foreword from former NBA star Reggie Miller.

== Development and publication history ==
Basketball (and Other Things) was published by Abrams Image on October 10, 2017. It is the second collaboration between Serrano and Torres, following their 2015 New York Times best-seller The Rap Year Book. Basketball (and Other Things) shares a title with a previous email newsletter from Serrano and Torres; begun in March 2016, the newsletter had over 30,000 subscribers as of May 2016.

When pre-sales opened on Amazon for Basketball (and Other Things) in February 2017, the book hit number 13 on the site's bestseller list. When Barnes & Noble announced in June that they were producing a special edition to include basketball cards with the book sold only in their stores, Basketball (and Other Things) made it to number one on Barnes & Noble's Top 100 Bestselling Books list.

In November 2017, the book reached number one on The New York Times Best Sellers list for sports and fitness books.

On December 31, 2017, former United States President Barack Obama listed Serrano's book as one of his favorite books of the year, a "bonus for hoops fans."

== Chapters ==
The start of each of the book's 33 chapters has a full-page illustration of an iconic jersey of a player who wore the chapter's number, except for chapter 18 which features an illustration of the fictional action-movie character John Harder, played by James Harden.

Chapter	Jersey
01	Oscar Robertson
02	Moses Malone
03	Allen Iverson
04	Adrian Dantley
05	Jason Kidd
06	Julius Erving
07	Pete Maravich
08	Kobe Bryant
09	Tony Parker
10	Walt Frazier
11	Isiah Thomas
12	John Stockton
13	Wilt Chamberlain
14	Bob Cousy
15	Vince Carter
16	Bob Lanier
17	John Havlicek
18	John Harder
19	Willis Reed
20	Gary Payton
21	Tim Duncan
22	Clyde Drexler
23	Michael Jordan
24	Rick Barry
25	Mark Price
26	Kyle Korver
27	Zaza Pachulia
28	Arron Afflalo
29	Paul Silas
30	Stephen Curry
31	Reggie Miller
32	Magic Johnson
33	Larry Bird
