= Movies (and Other Things) =

Illustrated essay collection by Shea Serrano and Arturo Torres

Movies (and Other Things): A Collection of Questions Asked, Answered, Illustrated
- Author: Shea Serrano
- Illustrator: Arturo Torres
- Series: "And Other Things"
- Release number: 2
- Subject: Movies
- Genre: Illustrated essays
- Publisher: Twelve
- Publication date: 2019
- Publication place: United States
- Pages: 256

Movies (and Other Things): A Collection of Questions Asked, Answered, Illustrated, written by Shea Serrano and illustrated by Arturo Torres, was published in October 2019. It became the duo's third consecutive number-one bestseller on The New York Times Best Seller list.

== Publication history ==
Movies (and Other Things) is Shea Serrano and Arturo Torres's third book together. It was published by Twelve, an imprint of Grand Central at Hachette.

== Content ==
The 256-page book has 30 chapters on different movies. Each is illustrated by Torres and each poses a question to be answered in the essay.

Actor John Leguizamo contributed a preface and Don Cheadle wrote an afterword.

== Reception ==
In the Los Angeles Times, Jen Yamato wrote, "Each essay turns the pop culture whiz's voracious appetite for movies of the last several decades into jumping-off points for wider cultural conversations and curiosities." In Esquire, Jack Holmes called it "a charming examination of industry tropes and his personal hobby-horses across all the movies he's watched—sometimes many times—since the '80s."
