= List of University of the Incarnate Word people =

This is a list of University of the Incarnate Word people who have some significant affiliation with the school. Individuals listed may have attended the university at one point, but did not necessarily graduate.

== Faculty ==
- Margaret Patrice Slattery, professor, dean, president and chancellor of UIW

== Alumni ==
=== Athletics ===
- Ephraim Banda, professional football coach
- Esteban Bayona, professional soccer player
- Kevin Brown, professional football player
- Zach Calzada, professional football player
- Flávio Ferri, professional soccer player
- Max Gunderson, professional soccer player
- Clint Killough, college football coach
- Kiki Lara, professional soccer player and college soccer coach
- Denzel Livingston, professional basketball player
- Steve Lutz, college basketball coach
- Carlos Mercado, professional soccer player
- Henrietta Ónodi, Hungarian Olympic gymnast and International Gymnastics Hall of Fame member
- Nich Pertuit, professional football player
- David Robinson, professional basketball player; first overall pick in the 1987 NBA Draft
- Lindsey Scott Jr., professional football player and college football coach
- Myke Tavarres, professional football player
- Cam Ward, professional football player; first overall pick in the 2025 NFL Draft
- Cole Wick, professional football player
- Joseph Zema, professional football player

=== Arts and entertainment ===
- Marilyn Artus, visual artist
- Jesse Borrego, actor
- Benjamin Bryant, writer, broadcaster, and television producer
- Ricardo Chavira, actor
- Kevin Connolly, voice actor
- Debra Maffett, Miss America 1983
- Celia Newman, actress
- Lisa Marie Newmyer, actress
- Josefina Niggli, playwright and novelist
- Nadia Sahari, actress, author, producer, talk show host, singer and entrepreneur
- Sam Sanders, host of It's Been A Minute With Sam Sanders on National Public Radio
- Linda Stouffer, former CNN Headline News anchor

=== Politics, law, and service ===
- Dolores Gresham, former Tennessee politician
- Lucy Killea, former California politician
- José Manuel Lozano, member of the Texas House of Representatives
- Blanca Magrassi Scagno, Mexican pro-democracy activist and National Action Party politician
- Marina Garcia Marmolejo, United States district judge of the United States District Court for the Southern District of Texas
- Justin Rodriguez, former member of the Texas House of Representatives and a commissioner of Bexar County, Texas from the 2nd precinct

=== Other ===
- Sister Joseph Marie Armer, nun and botanist
- Peter J. Holt, chairman of Spurs Sports & Entertainment

== See also ==
- List of people from San Antonio
