= Arturo Torres (artist) =

American illustrator

- Occupations: Artist, illustrator
- Notable work: The Rap Year Book; Basketball (and Other Things); Movies (and Other Things)
- Website: arturodraws.com

Arturo Torres is a Dallas-based artist. He has notably collaborated with Shea Serrano on three New York Times best-selling books in which Torres illustrated Serrano's essays. The first was The Rap Year Book: The Most Important Rap Song From Every Year Since 1979, Discussed, Debated, and Deconstructed in 2015, then Basketball (and Other Things): A Collection of Questions Asked, Answered, Illustrated, in 2017; and in 2019, Movies (and Other Things): A Collection of Questions Asked, Answered, Illustrated.

== Early life ==
Torres grew up in the Garland suburb of Dallas, Texas. He was drawn to art from early childhood, with friends asking to buy his work as early as middle school. High school was his first encounter with working artists: he told Complex Magazine, "I went to this gallery and saw this local artist...I was just amazed by it, because I had never seen a real artist or someone who was doing it for a living."

== Career ==
Torres began his career working a day job managing a co-working space, but was also pursuing art, including designing flyers for bands and DJs.

=== Collaboration with Shea Serrano ===
Writer Shea Serrano saw one of Torres's flyers in the course of writing the text for his forthcoming book, The Rap Year Book. Three months from the due date, Serrano still had not found an illustrator, until he saw a flyer announcing a performance by Dallas rap group The Outfit, Texas. As recounted to Texas Monthly, Serrano thought immediately, "This is the exact style that I'm trying to find." He contacted the group's management asking for information about who had made their flyer, then tracked Torres down on social media, and Torres agreed to work on the book.

The Rap Year Book: The Most Important Rap Song From Every Year Since 1979, Discussed, Debated, and Deconstructed was published on October 13, 2015, and repeatedly made New York Times best-seller lists.

Torres and Serrano continued to collaborate, in 2016 developing a weekly newsletter called "Basketball (And Other Things)" that had 21,000 subscribers as of May 12, 2016. The newsletter was both ad-free and also free to readers, but the audience continually asked to donate to support the work. Usually offers were staunchly refused (Serrano would post screenshots of PayPal refunds issued to supporters who tried to send money anyway), and when the team has occasionally relented, contributions from readers have often been given away to charity.

Torres has also drawn a series of limited edition bookmarks, thus far of NBA players and hip-hop artists. The bookmarks, dispersed via Serrano's Twitter feed in exchange for a small fee covering production and shipping costs, a screenshot of a Rap Year Book purchase or simply given away for free, are often all claimed in less than an hour, but as with the newsletter, income is frequently donated to charitable causes. In August 2016, Serrano gleefully announced to Twitter followers who'd purchased Torres's "Vengeance Russell" (Westbrook) bookmarks that "he'd actually tricked them into doing something nice": the income paid for some 150 Houston schoolchildren to have free haircuts the day before school started. Following the announcement that the Westbrook bookmark had been a secret fundraiser, other Serrano and Torres fans asked to pay for catering and music at the event, to feed and entertain kids waiting for a haircut.

Torres and Serrano next published a book about basketball, which shares a title with the newsletter. Basketball (and Other Things): A Collection of Questions Asked, Answered, Illustrated was published in October 2017 and reached number one on The New York Times best-seller list for sports and fitness books in November. They have also continued to collaborate at The Ringer, which Serrano joined as staff writer in July 2016.

=== Visual style ===
Torres has cited superheroes and his favorite childhood cartoons as early visual influences. A review in PopMatters described Torres's Rap Year Book illustrations as "bright, colorful, and offbeat cartoons...featuring depictions of Kanye and Jay-Z on a movie poster, Dr. Dre in scrubs, Drake using a pottery wheel, and more."

Serrano said he was drawn to the texture Torres developed in his work, telling Complex Magazine: "It looked like, even when I was looking at it on my phone or computer, I could rub my fingers across the screen and be able to feel the paper that he drew it on."

== Bibliography ==
- The Rap Year Book: The Most Important Rap Song From Every Year Since 1979, Discussed, Debated, and Deconstructed (Abrams Image, 2015)
- Basketball (and Other Things): A Collection of Questions Asked, Answered, Illustrated (Abrams Image, 2017)
