= Preston E. Smith Unit =

Men's state prison in Lamesa, Texas

Coordinates: 32°43′33″N 101°54′44″W

- Interactive map of Preston E. Smith Unit
- Location: 1313 CR 19 Lamesa, Texas
- Status: open
- Security class: G1 - G5, Administrative Segregation
- Capacity: 2234
- Opened: October 1992
- Managed by: Texas Department of Criminal Justice

The Preston E. Smith Unit is a state prison for men located in West Texas, in Lamesa, Dawson County, owned and operated by the Texas Department of Criminal Justice. This facility was opened in October 1992, and a maximum capacity of 2234 male inmates held at various security levels.

The prison was named for Texas governor Preston Smith.

== Notable Inmates ==
Inmate Name	Register Number	Status	Details
Johnny Avalos	07375795 / 02252506	Serving a life sentence.	Also known as "The San Antonio Strangler" who murdered 5 people between 2012 and 2015.
