= Shea Serrano =

American author

- Born: June 1, 1981 (age 45); San Antonio, Texas, U.S.
- Education: Sam Houston State University
- Occupations: Journalist; author
- Years active: 2007–present
- Spouse: Larami
- Children: 3

Shea Serrano (born 1981) is an American author, journalist, humorist, and former teacher. He is best known for his work with the sports and pop culture websites, The Ringer and Grantland, as well as his books, including The Rap Year Book, Basketball (and Other Things) and Movies (and Other Things), all of which were The New York Times #1 best-sellers.

Serrano also created, produced, and wrote the 2023 television series Primo, a semi-autobiographical sitcom that centers a Latino family.

Writing about Serrano for GQ, Chris Gayomali said: "If you were to draw a triple Venn diagram of hoops, trunk bangers, and jokes made at the expense of J. Cole, Grantland writer Shea Serrano would be smack-dab in the center, probably wearing a Tim Duncan jersey." Serrano's activity and humor on Twitter have earned a devoted following, nicknamed the FOH Army.

== Early life ==
Serrano was born in San Antonio, Texas and grew up in the neighborhood of Valley Hi. He is Mexican-American. He graduated from Sam Houston State University, where he majored in psychology. He also was in Omega Delta Phi.

After graduating from college, Serrano moved to Houston, where he worked in construction before becoming a middle-school science teacher. He taught 8th grade science at a Title 1 school in Houston for nine years.

== Career ==
=== Journalism ===
Serrano began writing in 2007 as a way to supplement his family's income when his wife, pregnant with twins, was put on bedrest. After briefly writing for the Near Northwest Banner, Serrano freelanced for the Houston Press. He predominately wrote about hip-hop after noticing that the majority of the writers only wrote about rock music despite the fact Houston is a cornerstone of southern rap music.

Serrano's first work that drew national attention was his Houston Press piece on rapper Trae tha Truth's ban from a Houston radio station and the rapper's subsequent lawsuit against the station. This piece allowed him to earn a place at the Houston Press' sister publication, the LA Weekly. Serrano continued to earn national attention with his pieces about his children and stories about the songs played at his school dance and birthday party. While there, he wrote a humor piece describing having sex with his wife while listening to Drake. Grantland writer Molly Lambert saw the piece and passed it to her editors, who then invited Serrano to freelance for them. His first piece was about gift-shopping with the rapper 2 Chainz. Serrano joined the full-time Grantland staff in July 2015.

In July 2016, Serrano moved with much of the Grantland team to Bill Simmons' new entertainment platform, The Ringer.

Serrano has also written for GQ, ESPN, LA Weekly, XXL, Rolling Stone, MTV, and Vice.

=== Books ===
Serrano's first book, Bun B's Rap Coloring and Activity Book, was published 17 September 2013. The book consists of coloring and activity pages based on popular rappers. The work was a collaboration with Houston rapper Bun B, although Serrano wrote and illustrated the book himself.

Serrano's second book, The Rap Year Book: The Most Important Rap Song From Every Year Since 1979, Discussed, Debated, and Deconstructed, was published 13 October 2015 by Abrams Image. It soon appeared on The New York Times Best Seller list for the advice, how-to and miscellaneous category as well as the culture category. In March 2016, the book was optioned for a documentary series. In September 2016, the book was listed by Billboard as one of the 100 best music books of all time.

Serrano's third book Basketball (and Other Things) was published in October 2017. Illustrator Arturo Torres, Serrano's collaborator on The Rap Year Book, also illustrated Basketball (and Other Things). It debuted at number two on The New York Times Best Seller list for the advice, how-to and miscellaneous category. In November 2017, it climbed to number one on The New York Times best-seller list for the sports and fitness category. On 31 December 2017, former U.S. President Barack Obama mentioned Basketball (And Other Things) in a Facebook post describing his favorite books of the year.

Serrano's fourth book Movies (And Other Things) was published in October 2019 and became his third consecutive number one bestseller on The New York Times Best Seller list.

=== Television ===
In addition to the documentary project based on The Rap Year Book, Serrano also created a sitcom based on his life called Primo. In October 2017, ABC Studios ordered a pilot for the show, written by Serrano and produced by Serrano and Michael Schur. The Hollywood Reporter described the project as "a single-camera comedy...based on Serrano's life growing up in a family with five uncles who all have different perspectives on manhood." On Twitter, Serrano wrote that he "got tired of waiting for there to be more mexicans on TV so i asked [Schur] to help me try & make a family sitcom for ABC about them." The show debuted in May 2023, to wide acclaim.

=== Publishing ===
In 2020, Serrano founded a publishing house called Halfway Books, operated from his Gumroad website. He had previously published two illustrated essay collections on the site, on the television shows The Office (called "Conference Room Five Minutes") and Scrubs ("Where Do You Think We Are?"). These collections, which continued his collaboration with Torres, were published as PDFs. The first Halfway Books publication was also digital, a short story by Serrano available as PDF or audiobook. "Post: A Short Story of No Consequence at All" was published on 15 July 2020.

The next Halfway Books are a series of five commissioned long-form essays on a hip-hop album of the writer's choosing, beginning with Taylor Crumpton's "Taylor Crumpton Considers Big Tuck's Purple Hulk" on 1 December 2020. Intended to support aspiring writers, Serrano offered $3000 stipends and a month-long mentorship, saying, "Too often, talented writers are elbowed out of the game because they can't afford to work an unpaid internship somewhere or they can't afford to write for free for a few months somewhere to build up a portfolio." The series authors will retain the rights to their work as well as receiving a full designed digital version of their essay and placement on Serrano's website. The sales from "Post" helped seed the $20,000 Serrano put into the program and he said it motivated him to write more short fiction: "If all I have to do is write a short story and sell it, and then I can use the money I make from that to do this other cool thing, that's reason enough to do it again."

=== Social media and other projects ===
Serrano has an ardent following on his active Twitter feed, where "office hours are almost always open. He holds court daily on matters ranging from basketball to Taco Bell to Young Thug to parenting to the injustices of unpaid content creation...Periodically, Serrano will tweet out his email address so that anyone can ask him for advice on making it as a writer." The Verge called the community he created this way a "utopia on Twitter"; GOOD Magazine called him "Our New Favorite Internet Hero."

On 20 March 2016, Serrano announced a weekly newsletter "Basketball (And Other Things)", which came out every Tuesday, focused on the National Basketball Association. The newsletter features musings from Serrano and illustrations from Torres. The inaugural issue featured NBA players in scenes from popular movies, starting with Golden State Warriors forward Draymond Green in a scene from the 1987 movie Over the Top. Within weeks, the newsletter had reached over 30,000 subscribers. The newsletter is published for free, though Serrano and Torres allowed for donations to be made twice. They used the donations to make contributions to charities, including the Genesis Women's Shelter, Kids' Meals, Operation Turkey and more. In total, they've donated approximately $10,000 via newsletter donations.

Serrano's Twitter feed has also spawned considerable charitable giving. On 21 December 2016, Serrano and his Twitter followers, colloquially termed the FOH ARMY, joined up to give a parking lot attendant who'd helped Serrano find his car at an airport a $3000 tip. They playfully referred to it as the Radelle Christmas Miracle. On 9 March 2017, Serrano and company donated $12,539.87 to Planned Parenthood in recognition of International Women's Day. On 27 March 2017, Serrano mobilized the FOH ARMY again, this time to help one former student fund a trip to Turkey she was hoping to take to help teach children there English. She'd set a $3700 goal for her Go Fund Me page; Serrano and his Twitter followers raised nearly $4,500 in less than an hour. On 17 August 2017, Serrano and the FOH ARMY joined up to fund several teachers' Donors Choose pages to help them start the school year off right, often completing the requested funding in a matter of minutes; two days later, the group contributed over $10,700 to support an LGBTQ youth center in San Antonio, raising the money in less than seven hours. On 31 August 2017, Serrano invited Twitter followers to join him in a "Fuck Hurricane Harvey" round of donations to support Houston relief work, with Serrano putting in $200 to start the effort. Four hours later, the group had contributed more than $90,000; by the end of the night, they had raised more than $130,000. On 8 December 2017, Serrano and the FOH ARMY donated $19,000 to The Children's Shelter in San Antonio.

== Personal life ==
Serrano lives in San Antonio, Texas with his wife, Larami Serrano, their three sons, and their French bulldog Younger Jeezy. Shea and Larami met in college in 2000 and were married in a hospital after Larami was hospitalized the day before their wedding.

== Filmography ==
=== Film ===
Year	Title	Role	Notes
2023	Miguel Wants to Fight		Writer

=== Television ===
Year	Title	Role	Notes
2023	Primo		Creator, writer, executive producer
2023	Neon		Creator, writer, executive producer
