= Graciela Sanchez =

American social justice activist

- Born: April 24, 1960 (age 65); San Antonio, Texas
- Education: Yale University
- Occupations: Social activist, executive director
- Known for: Founder of Esperanza Peace and Justice Center

Graciela Sanchez (born April 24, 1960) is an American community organizer and social justice activist based out of San Antonio, Texas. She is the founder and executive director of the Esperanza Peace and Justice Center, known for being a long-time organizer in the queer community.

== Early life and education ==
Sanchez was born April 24, 1960 in San Antonio, Texas. While in junior high school, Sanchez joined with her classmates to organize a protest over the quality of the cafeteria food. She cites their successful results in collectively organizing as teaching her the value of advocating for a cause. Sanchez also was influenced by her parents' involvement in the Chicano Movement of the late 1960s.

Sanchez attended Yale University. While at school, Sanchez recounts finding inspiration in the feminist anthology This Bridge Called My Back: Writings By Radical Women of Color.

== Career and activism ==
Sanchez started her career working for the Mexican American Legal Defense and Educational Fund. She also worked with activist Willie Velasquez on the Southwest Voter Registration Education Project. 1986, Sanchez became the first American accepted to Escuela Internacional de Cine y Televisión, a film school in Cuba. Interested in how America's policies at the time impacted people throughout the world, Sanchez made a documentary called Testimonios de Nicaragua on the Sandinista revolution. She produced another film in 1988 about queer rights in Cuba entitled No porque lo diga Fidel Castro.

In 1987, Sanchez founded the Esperanza Peace and Justice Center. The center was established to advocate for LGBTQ rights, basic civil rights, and economic justice. The center also works to preserve historic buildings in San Antonio’s West Side. In founding the center, Sanchez aimed to create a new organization that was more broadly focused than other civic organizations in San Antonio at the time. Sanchez became director of Esperanza in 1988.

Sanchez is a founding member of multiple organizations in San Antonio, including the Lesbian Gay assembly and the Lesbian/Gay Media Project.

== Awards and legacy ==
In 2019, Sanchez was honored by the National Women's History Alliance as a "Champion of Peace and Nonviolence". In 2021, she received a Cornerstone Award from the Texas Society of Architects at its 82nd Annual Conference and Design Expo.

The National Women's History Alliance describes her leadership as having "changed the political character of San Antonio". Journalist Jade Esteban Estrada has said of Sanchez: "If it's unjust, she's on it." In response to death threats she has received over her life's work, she says: "You can't separate art and culture from justice and respect".
