= Kim Bishop (artist) =

- Born: Austin, Texas
- Education: Texas State University (BFA, MA); University of Texas at San Antonio (MFA)
- Occupations: Visual artist, educator

Kim Bishop is an American visual artist and educator based in San Antonio, Texas. She is known for her drawings, printmaking and public art installations.

== Early life and education ==
Bishop was born and raised in Austin, Texas. She earned a Bachelor of Fine Arts in commercial art from Southwest Texas State University in 1985, and later a Master of Arts in curriculum and instruction. She received a Master of Fine Arts from the University of Texas at San Antonio (UTSA) in 2022.

== Career ==
Bishop taught in Texas public schools from 1990 to 2017. She also taught art at the Southwest School of Art and began teaching drawing and visual culture at UTSA in 2021.

In 2008, Bishop co-founded the MOSAIC Student Artist Program at Blue Star Contemporary.

In 2010, Bishop and her partner and artist Luis Valderas, founded Art to the Third Power (A³), an artists' group that used steamrollers to make prints from carved wooden blocks.

In 2012, Bishop and Valderas opened 3rd Space Art Gallery in San Antonio.

Bishop's solo exhibitions include Passage (2009) at Blue Star Contemporary, Learning to Fly (2016) at the Rusteberg Art Gallery of the University of Texas Rio Grande Valley, Paradise at Freight Gallery in San Antonio (2019) and the Elisabet Ney Museum in Austin (2020), and Threads & After Shocks (2023) at Sala Diaz in San Antonio. Her group exhibitions include Texas Draws III (2014) at the Southwest School of Art, which featured drawings from her On the Rim series, and Texas Size Breach (2015), a printmaking exhibition at Texas A&M University–San Antonio.

Bishop was a mentor in the New York Foundation for the Arts Immigrant Artist Mentoring Program and co-curated exhibitions featuring program participants at Centro de Artes in San Antonio in 2019 and 2022.

Her public art projects include Poet's Pointe (2023), an installation incorporating poetry by local writers at a park near Woodlawn Lake in San Antonio, Fountainhead (2026) and Rise Up (2026), two permanent murals at San Antonio International Airport depicting imagery associated with the San Antonio River.

Bishop's work is listed in the collections of the University of Texas at San Antonio, Texas A&M University–Kingsville and the San Antonio Public Library.
