= Lorenzo Gomez III =

- Occupations: Entrepreneur; Author; Public speaker
- Organization(s): Geekdom Media; Geekdom; 80/20 Foundation
- Notable work: The Cilantro Diaries: Business Lessons from the Most Unlikely Places; Tafolla Toro: Three Years of Fear
- Website: lorenzogomez.com

Lorenzo Gomez III is an American author, public speaker, entrepreneur and co-founder and current CEO of Geekdom Media.

Gomez's previous roles include CEO of San Antonio’s co-working space Geekdom, and co-founder of Tech Bloc, a San Antonio based tech initiative. Gomez currently serves as Chairman of both Geekdom and the 80/20 Foundation, a philanthropic organization. Gomez is also the author of the Cilantro Diaries: Business Lessons from the Most Unlikely Places, and Tafolla Toro: Three Years of Fear.

== Early life ==
Gomez was born and raised on the west side of San Antonio, Texas. Gomez attended both the Brackenridge High School and Health Careers High School, which led to an escape from the gang violence and bullying that he experienced while growing up.

== Career ==
Gomez left his job selling computers in 2001 and to serve as director of project management Rackspace Technology.

In 2001, while working at Rackspace, Gomez met Rackspace co-founder, Graham Weston. In 2011, Weston offered Gomez a CEO position at Weston's co-working space, Geekdom. Lorenzo then became the CEO of Geekdom Media, an expansion of Geekdom that includes podcasts and other media, and would go on to serve as Executive Director of the 80/20 Foundation.

In 2015, Gomez helped co-found Tech Bloc, a San Antonio tech initiative that aims to produce new jobs in the industry and have a positive economic impact on the city.

Gomez has been featured as a keynote speaker for Texas A&M University. He has also served as the commencement speaker for the University of Texas at San Antonio.

== Works ==
- Cilantro Diaries: Business Lessons from the Most Unlikely Places
- Tafolla Toro: Three Years of Fear
