= Offbeats (band) =

American garage rock band

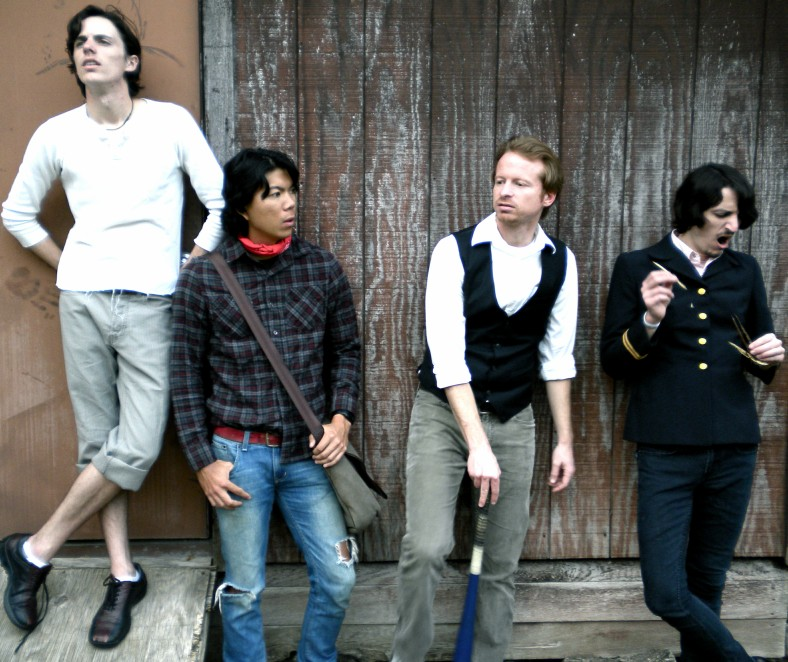

Background information
- Origin: San Antonio, Texas, U.S.
- Genres: Garage rock
- Years active: 2001–present
- Members: Sean, Colin & Bryan Foster; Eric Romasanta
- Past members: Mike Griffin

The Offbeats is an American musical band based in the Texas city of San Antonio with a garage rock sound. Their music has been compared to The Strokes and The Clash and the group has been getting positive critical attention by music critics writing in San Antonio media. Music critic Jeremy Martin described their overall sound as "early ’60s garage rock through a post-post-punk filter." They recorded several albums, and their recent CD Lights Out in the City was notable for its musical quality as well as its newspaper-themed cover art.

== Beginnings ==
The band started as a collaboration in 2001 between Bryan Foster and Eric Romasanta who were finishing high school in San Antonio. They played various clubs in San Antonio, with musicians entering and leaving during these early years, and finally settling on a five-piece band. From 2002 to 2008, they played regularly at local clubs and honed their music. They released several EPs but the recorded sessions felt short of the group's expectations, according to lead singer Bryan Foster, who said after making recordings that "it was never what we felt like it was when we had that live vibe."

In 2008, their full-length debut CD entitled Standards was released, which reworked many of their previous tunes. It was described by music critic Jeremy Martin as "impressively professional and mature" despite being self-recorded and self-produced. What helped, according to then-lead guitarist Eric Romasanta, was rehearsing in their own space, which gave the group an "unlimited amount of time to spend on the album" including scrapping and reworking arrangements as necessary. He said:

We were able to get the parts arranged the way we wanted and tweak some of the songs. -- Eric Romasanta, 2008

The group improved technically. They continued to play regularly at clubs, including doing benefit concerts with other bands. Songwriter Bryan Foster improved during these years, according to critic Jeremy Martin. He wrote:

Romasanta and Foster’s guitars often sound like they’re picked with rusty razor blades. -- Jeremy Martin, 2008

== Personnel problems ==
Band member	Instruments; Before 2008	Instruments; After 2008
Eric Romasanta	Guitar	Bass guitar
Bryan Foster	Vocals	Vocals, guitar, keyboards, bass
Colin Foster	Bass guitar	Drums
Sean Foster	Guitar, keyboards, bass, drums	Guitar
Mike Griffin	drums	

After releasing The Standards, the group suffered a major personnel problem when their drummer, Mike Griffin, departed without warning. Singer Bryan Foster said "our first instinct was to regroup." They decided not to replace Griffin with another drummer but instead slimmed to only four members, and the musicians switched instruments (see table.) The changes were described as "drastic" by critic Enrique Lopetegui.

In 2009, during this transition, there were some dubious performances when the group did not have its act together. Critic Jeremy Martin, hearing one of their performances live, gave them a mixed review, and described the somewhat middle-aged audience as nonplussed with the group's loudness, and criticized the band's sound mixing as well.

== Renewal ==
By 2011, the Offbeats recorded Lights Out In The City. Their songs described fictional but plausible "blackout stories" with thought-provoking lyrics, according to music critic Jim Beal Jr. San Antonio Current music critic Enrique Lopetegui described Bryan Foster as being similar to Mick Jagger and Julian Casablancas. He described the Lights Out in the City album as "catchy" and wrote that it was "one of the best local albums of the year." Music critic Jim Beal Jr. wrote that the album was "smart, clever and catchy." Lopetegui agreed, and elaborated:

The lyrics are smart and show the Offbeats as vulnerable boys in a world falling apart, guys who, despite it all, have the balls to take life seriously and give it all they’ve got. They denounce those who wear collared shirts and kneel in church to window-dress the lies... -- Enrique Lopetegui, San Antonio Current, 2011

In 2011, the band plays venues around San Antonio, and has four musicians, including three brothers: Bryan, Colin and Sean Foster, along with guitarist Eric Romasanta.
