= Somerset Independent School District =

School district in Texas, United States

Somerset Independent School District SISD
- 7791 6th Street; Somerset, Texas 78069 Bexar & Atascosa counties

District information
- Established: 1922; 104 years ago
- Superintendent: Jose Moreno
- Deputy superintendent(s): Tracy Padilla
- Schools: 7

Other information
- Website: www.sisdk12.net

Somerset Independent School District is a public school district based in Somerset, Texas (USA).

Established in 1920, it is located in Bexar County with a portion of the district extending into Atascosa County. The district currently has approx 4,100 students. The superintendent is Dr. José Moreno.

In 2009, the school district was rated "academically acceptable" by the Texas Education Agency.

== List of schools ==
- Shirleen Zacharias Early College Leadership Academy (ZECLA) (9-12)
- Somerset High School (9-12)
- Somerset Junior High School (7-8)
- Savannah Heights Intermediate School (5-6)
- SSG Michael P. Barrera Veterans Elementary School (PreK-4)
- Somerset Elementary School (1-4)
- Somerset Early Childhood Elementary School (PreK-K)
