= Daniel Dumitru =

American physiatrist

- Born: San Antonio, Texas America
- Education: University of Texas Health Science Center in San Antonio
- Known for: Physical medicine and rehabilitation, electrodiagnostic medicine

Daniel Dumitru is an American physiatrist and electromyographer. He is currently a professor of physical medicine and rehabilitation at University of Texas Health Science Center at San Antonio.

He is past president of the American Association of Electrodiagnostic Medicine (since renamed to the American Association of Neuromuscular and Electrodiagnostic Medicine), from which he won the Distinguished Researcher Award in 2000. He is also past president of the American Academy of Physical Medicine and Rehabilitation.

== Books ==
- Daniel Dumitru, Anthony A. Amato, Machiel Zwarts. Electrodiagnostic Medicine. Hanley & Belfus (2001). ISBN 1-56053-433-8
