= Mari Hernandez =

Photographer

Mari Hernandez (born 1979) is an American photographer known for her self-portraits that reflect Chicana cultural identity. She is a co-founder of Más Rudas, a Chicana artist collective. She has had works exhibited at the National Portrait Gallery, Crystal Bridges Museum of American Art, Artpace, and the Galveston Art Center. She has lived in San Antonio, Texas, and Los Angeles.

== Biography ==
Mari Hernandez was born in 1979, in San Antonio, Texas. Hernandez began exploring her own art aesthetic after visiting murals at the San Antonio Cultural Arts Center. Her husband is J.J. Lopez. She received her Bachelor’s degree in English Literature at the University of Texas at San Antonio.

=== Más Rudas ===
Hernandez is one of the co-founders of the group, Más Rudas (2009 - 2015). Mas Rudas is a group of four Chicana feminist artists: Mari Hernandez, Ruth Leonela Buentello, Sarah Castillo, and Kristin Gamez. The artists aim to represent their life experiences as Chicana women through art, videos, photography and installation.

=== Awards ===
She received a Joan Mitchell Foundation Emerging Artist Grant in 2017, as well as a National Association of Latino Arts and Cultures Fund for the Arts grant. In 2020, her piece Silia was one of the 42 works selected from a nationwide open call for the Outwin Boochever Portrait Competition and was on display at the National Portrait Gallery.

== Photography ==
- What Remains is a photo series created in 2018 that depicts the connection between one's physiognomy and identity.
- As Julia Pastrana, is a photo series inspired by the life of Julia Pastrana. This photo series was created in 2013.
- El Lenguaje, a triptych created in 2021, is about language's impact on cultural identity.
