= Johnny Avalos =

American serial killer and rapist (born 1986)

Johnny Joe Avalos
- Avalos
- Born: December 1, 1986 (age 39)
- Other name: "The San Antonio Strangler"
- Status: Incarcerated
- Convictions: Capital murder Sexual assault of a child
- Penalty: 2 concurrent life sentences without the possibility of parole

Details
- Victims: 5
- Span of crimes: 2012–2015
- Country: United States
- State: Texas
- Target: Females
- Date apprehended: April 12, 2015
- Imprisoned at: Preston E. Smith Unit

Johnny Joe Avalos (born December 1, 1986) is an American serial killer who raped and fatally strangled four women and a teenage girl in San Antonio, Texas, between 2012 and 2015. He strangled each victim with his hands, and also used plastic bags in three instances. He was connected to the murders through DNA and subsequently arrested in April 2015. Three years later, he pleaded guilty to the crimes and received two concurrent life sentences without the possibility of parole. He is now imprisoned at a maximum security penitentiary.

== Personal life ==
Avalos was born on December 1, 1986. An intellectually disabled man, he has lived in San Antonio's South Side for most of his life. Prior to the murders, he never married, and he was arrested several times for making terroristic threats, criminal mischief, and possession of a controlled substance. At night, Avalos often stalked women, mostly sex workers, after finishing his shift as a dishwasher for a restaurant near downtown.

== Murders ==
Avalos' modus operandi consisted of him raping, sometimes robbing, and strangling his victims with his hands and plastic bags. In addition to the five known murders attributed to him, Avalos claimed that at least 20 intended victims escaped before he could murder them. Although he described each of the alleged assaults, no actual evidence has been found to corroborate those claims.

In early October 2012, Avalos murdered his first known victim, 25-year-old Vanessa Lopez, by strangling her. A few days later, her body was found floating down the San Antonio River in a portion of Mission Reach. Lopez happened to be one of six women found dead under suspicious circumstances in Bexar County over a six-month period. Rumors circulated of a serial killer being responsible for the deaths, but the Police Chief said there was no evidence to support that possibility. The Bexar County Medical Examiner ruled nearly all the women's causes of death, including Lopez's, as undetermined.

On December 18, 2014, Avalos raped and fatally strangled Natalie Chavez, a 15-year-old runaway. He then dumped her naked body under the Vera Cruz Street bridge over Apache Creek on San Antonio's West Side. At about 10:00 a.m. the following morning, a man called the police after discovering her body. Upon arrival, investigators noticed her body showed signs of a struggle, and her death was quickly ruled a homicide. Although DNA was found at the crime scene, it was not matched to Avalos until the following April.

On approximately January 10, 2015, Avalos strangled 28-year-old Rosemary Perez to death. Her body was found wrapped in a sheet along a sidewalk in the 2100 block of San Fernando two days later. On April 4, 2015, he beat and strangled 46-year-old Genevieve Ramirez. Ramirez was found unconscious in a grassy alley along the 100 block of Avondale. She was naked from the waist down, and had bruising but no overt signs of trauma. Paramedics rushed her to a hospital, where she died from her injuries two months later. On April 15, 2015, the decomposing body of Avalos' final victim, 29-year-old Celia Lopez, was found at the 4400 block of South Presa. She had sustained trauma to her head and face. Investigators recovered DNA from men's underwear found near her body.

== Arrest and prosecution ==
On April 12, 2015, Avalos was arrested for sexually assaulting a minor in connection to Natalie Chavez's murder. Although they believed he was also responsible for her killing, they did not yet have enough evidence to charge him with it. During questioning, he claimed that he paid to have sex with Chavez but did not know how old she was. However, his sex-for-money claim is unsubstantiated, and he later admitted to knowing her real age. After more evidence was gathered, Avalos was charged with the murders of Chavez, Perez, Ramirez, and Celia Lopez. He was not connected to Vanessa Lopez's murder until the next year. On November 29, 2016, he was indicted on capital murder charges. Due to his intellectual disability, he was deemed not eligible for capital punishment. In 2019, he pleaded guilty to the charges and received two concurrent life sentences without the possibility of parole. As part of his plea agreement, he admitted his guilt in all five murders. He is now imprisoned at the Preston E. Smith Unit in Lamesa, Texas.

== See also ==
- Violence against women in the United States
- Crime in Texas
- List of serial killers in the United States
