= Gene Lyda =

American bull rider

Gene Lyda (born June 20, 1947) is an American former professional rodeo cowboy who specialized in bull riding. He now manages the Fort Stockton Division of La Escalera Ranch, one of the largest Black Angus cattle ranches in Texas.

== Early life ==
Gene Lyda was born in the South Texas brush country in Nixon, Texas, to Gerald and Randa Jean Lyda on June 20, 1947. He competed in bareback bronc riding, calf roping, team roping, and bull riding as a youth.

== Bull-riding career ==
In 1966, Lyda won the Texas State High School bull riding championship in Hallettsville, Texas, and the 1966 National High School bull riding championship in Wetumka, Oklahoma.

He then joined the Rodeo Cowboys Association (now the Professional Rodeo Cowboys Association) in 1967 and competed in the bull riding at intercollegiate rodeos while on a rodeo scholarship with Southwest Texas Junior College in Uvalde, Texas. In 1968, he won the National Intercollegiate Rodeo Association bull riding title of his region, as well as the reserve national college bull riding title.

Lyda competed professionally at the National Western Stock Show and Rodeo, Grand National Rodeo, Cheyenne Frontier Days, Pendleton Round-Up, American Royal Rodeo, Houston Livestock Show and Rodeo, Fort Worth Stock Show and Rodeo and Calgary Stampede. In 1969, he qualified to compete at the National Finals Rodeo in Oklahoma City, Oklahoma. At the Finals, Lyda successfully rode seven out of eight bulls.

At the 1971 Jasper, Texas rodeo, Lyda suffered severe head injuries and internal bleeding when a bull swung his horn back, hitting Lyda in the face near his right eye. He would pause his bull riding career for three years. He made his return in 1974, but now mainly rode in the semi-professional circuit.

Lyda officially retired from bull riding in 1985.

== Honors ==
In 2015, Lyda was inducted into the Texas Rodeo Cowboy Hall of Fame.

In 2024, he was inducted into the Bull Riding Hall of Fame. That same year, he was inducted into the All Cowboy & Arena Champions Hall of Fame.

== See also ==
- Pecos County, Texas
- Gerald Lyda
- Professional Rodeo Cowboys Association
- National Finals Rodeo
- Bull riding
- Rodeo
