= Todd White (artist) =

American painter

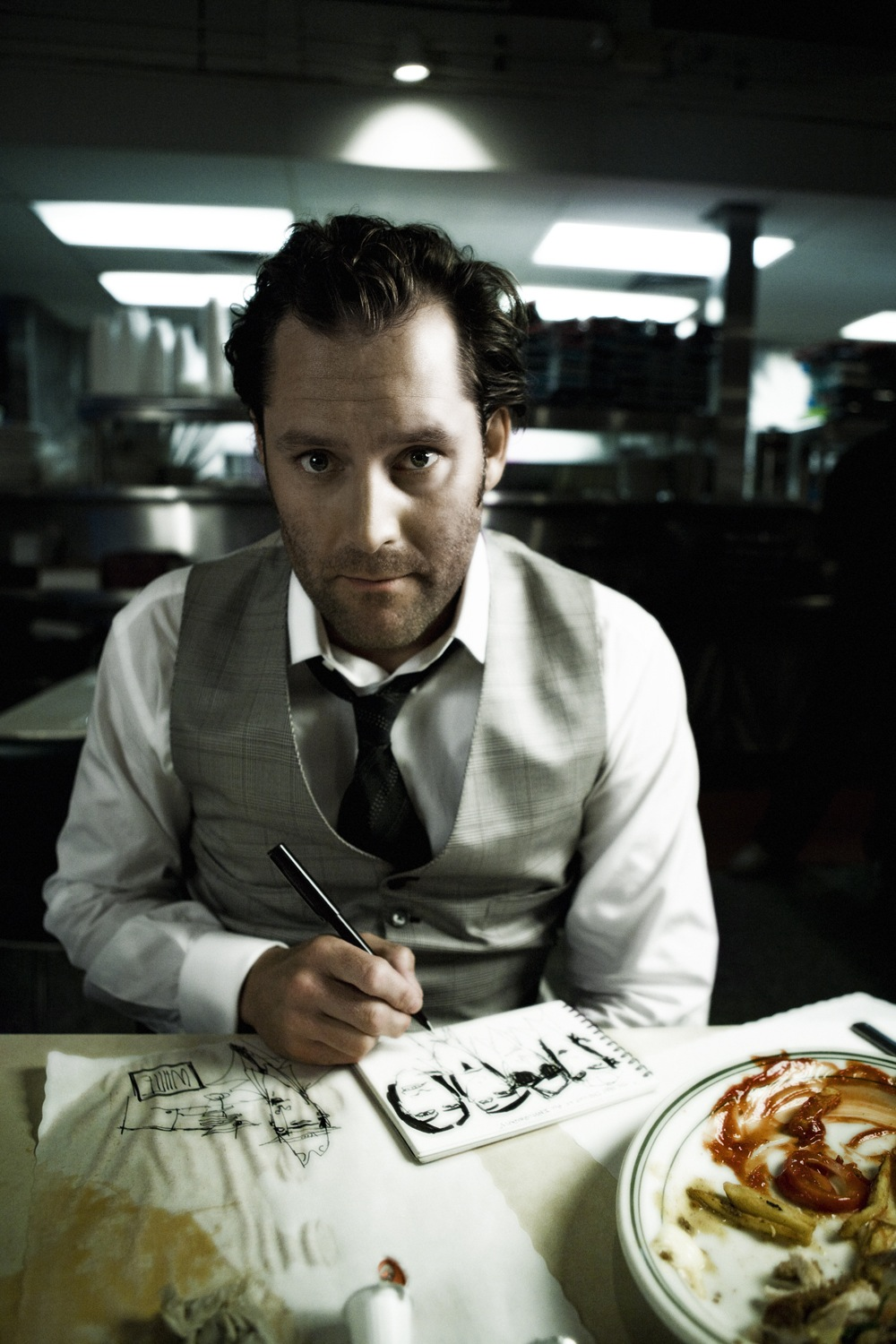
- Todd White sketching at a diner
- Born: Michael Todd White; October 10, 1969 (age 57); San Antonio, Texas
- Movement: American Figurative Expressionism

Michael Todd White (born October 10, 1969, in San Antonio, Texas) is a figurative expressionist painter. He has also been described as an avant-garde expressionist.

White was named the official artist for the Grammy Awards by the Recording Academy in 2007. His painting appeared on the ceremony's invitation and program book and served as the official image for the event.

His work was featured in the Inspirations of Oz Fine Art Collection, an exhibition commemorating the 70th anniversary of The Wizard of Oz. The collection toured designated cities all over the world including Miami, Los Angeles, Dubai, Japan, London, Toronto and Vienna.

In 2010, White was chosen to provide sketches for Coca-Cola Light in Mexico. White's six sketches are depicted on different faces of Coca-Cola Light bottles and cans, each featuring his distinctive box signature. This was the first time that Coke had collaborated with a fine artist to depict artwork for its label. The bottles were released in August 2010. As a result of some of these career achievements White has earned international recognition and a lengthy list of celebrity collectors.

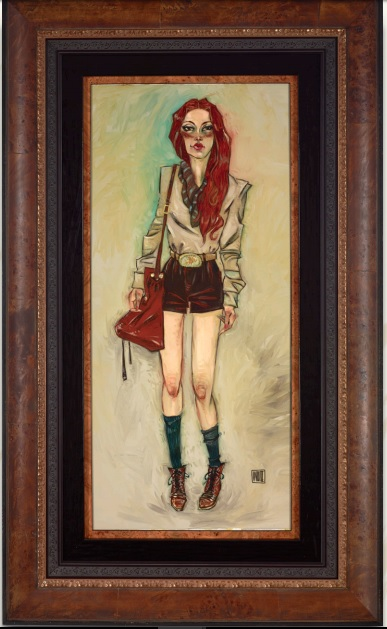
When She Threw Her Roses Down by Todd White

== Early years ==
White was born in San Antonio, Texas and attended John Marshall High School. White's grandmother, Wanda Spurlock, was a painter as is his mother, Kathryn Yahn, who specializes in traditional Southwestern landscapes. In addition to painting, Yahn is also an art teacher in San Antonio, Texas.

From 1991 to 2000, White worked in animation on various television shows, including Tiny Toons, and spent his final years in animation as the lead character designer for SpongeBob SquarePants. In 2000, White left Nickelodeon to pursue his passion of painting on a full-time basis.

He is a fourth degree black belt in Brazilian Jiu-Jitsu under Jean Jacques Machado

== Major gallery exhibitions ==
White's work hangs in a number of galleries in North America and he is currently one of the best selling artists in the United Kingdom. Some of White's most prominent exhibitions include a show at the Bank of Scotland in Manchester, England and at the unveiling of The World's Largest Todd White Collection, hosted by CNN's Larry King at Pechanga Resort and Casino in Temecula, California. Todd White's work was featured in the opening of Clarendon Fine Art Gallery in Hampstead, London alongside that of leading British contemporary artists Sherree Valentine-Daines and Christian Hook.

== Books ==
In 2010 Todd White released his first book which would collect all his work to date, including original sketches, insights to his creative process and personal comments as well as a biography. The original edition was limited to 850 numbered copies, and included two exclusive limited edition prints numbered and signed by the author. In 2018 he released his second book, The Devil's in the Detail.

== Personal life ==
In his spare time, Todd White is a practitioner of Brazilian jiu-jitsu. Having started training in the 1990s, he now owns and runs his own gym, Todd White Jiu Jitsu in Texas. He is currently a fifth-degree black belt in the martial art under Jean-Jacques Machado.
