= Ruth Leonela Buentello =

American artist (born 1984)

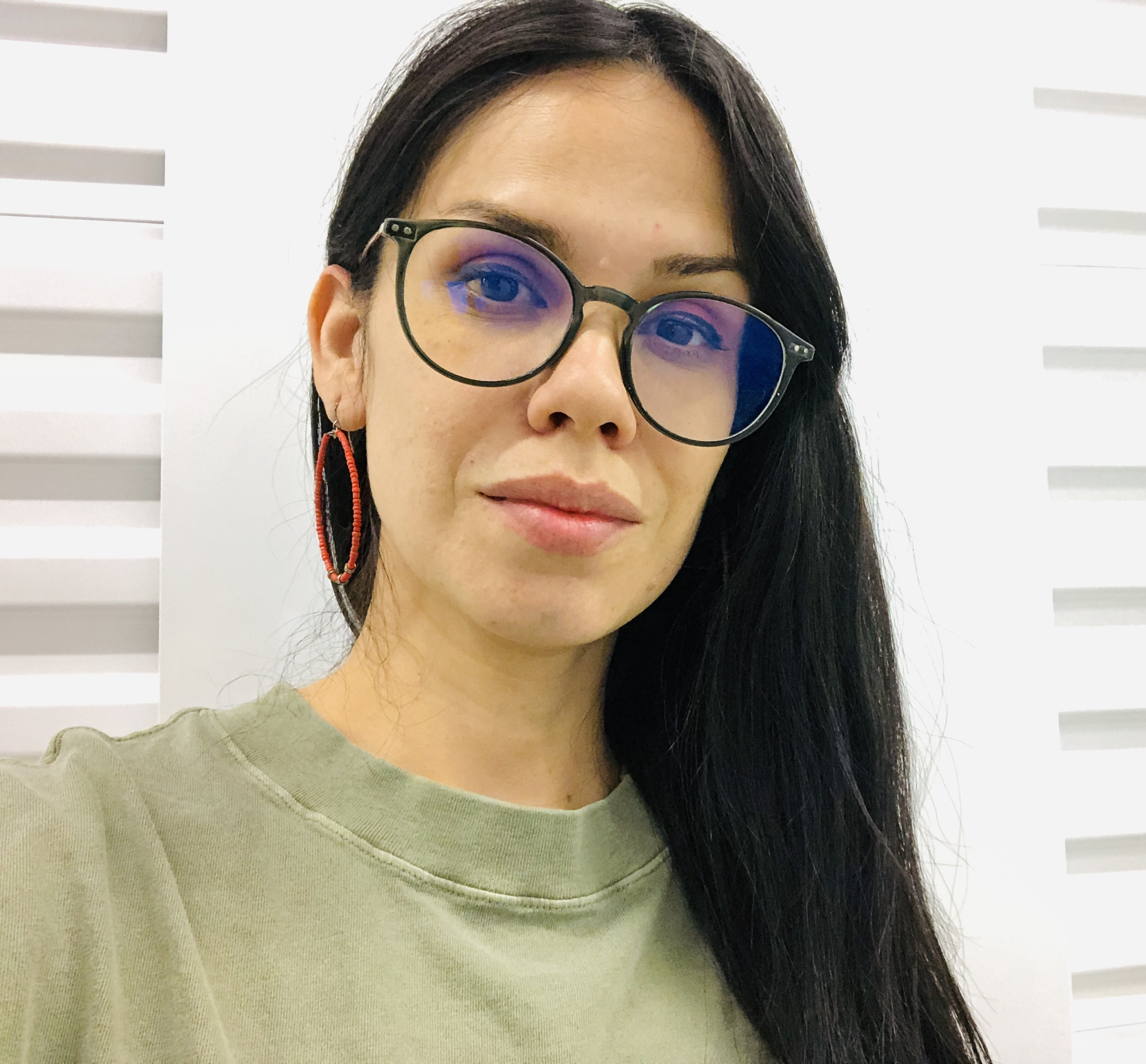
- Born: 1984; San Antonio
- Alma mater: School of the Art Institute of Chicago; Maine College of Art & Design
- Occupation: Artist, painter
- Awards: travel grant (2010, Artpace); Painters & Sculptors Grant (2017, Joan Mitchell Foundation); artist-in-residence (2019, Joan Mitchell Foundation)
- Website: ruthlbuentello.com/about-3/

Ruth Leonela Buentello (born 1984) is an American Chicana visual artist.

In 2019, she was named as a participant in the Joan Mitchell Foundation residency program. In 2017, she was awarded the Joan Mitchell Foundation Painters & Sculptors. She was the third Efroymson Emerging Artist in Residence sponsored by the University of Michigan.

== Early life and education ==
In 1984, Buentello was born in San Antonio, Texas.

She attended the School of the Art Institute of Chicago, and graduated with a Bachelors of Fine Arts in 2008. In 2021, Buentello graduated with a Master in Fine Art degree in painting from the Maine College of Art & Design in Portland.

Her work has focused on immigration, undocumented immigrants, patriarchy, machismo, labor, Chicana/o studies, and chicana art. In 2009, she had co-founded the Más Rudas Chicana Artist Collective (Más Rudas) with Sarah Castillo, Kristin Gamez, and Mari Hernandez.

In 2010, she studied abroad in France and Italy after receiving an Artist Travel Grant from Artpace to study the art of Nikki de Saint Phalle.

== Career ==
In 2001, she had worked as an assistant to Alex Rubio for a mural on Chupaderas Street in San Antonio. In 2003, she created Piedad (Piety), a street mural focusing on police brutality in San Antonio as well.

She participated in the Mexic-Arte Museum's exhibit Young Latino Artists 16: Thought Cloud in 2011. She held a residency in 2012 with the non-profit Serie Project. That same year, she published in the peer-review journal Chicana/Latina Studies. In 2013, Más Rudas presented a collective work titled “Ruda Phat” at the Institute of Texas Cultures.

In 2014, Más Rudas guest curated the "Young Latina Artists" show at the Mexic-Arte Museum. The collective's decision to rename the "Young Latino Artists" exhibit Buentello had participated in just 3 years earlier to the "Young Latina Artists" exhibit was meant to highlight Latina artists' work.

On October 24–25, 2015, Más Rudas presented their original performance piece “Walking Altars" at the Luminaria art festival.

In 2017, she was awarded the Joan Mitchell Foundation Painters & Sculptors grant. That same year, Buentello's “Domestic Narratives” exhibit was shown alongside Ana Fernandez's “Eastside Westside” exhibit at the Guadalupe Cultural Arts Center in San Antonio.

In 2018, the work of Buentello alongside the work of Kathy Vargas and 3 other artists was exhibited in the University of Texas at San Antonio's "Deep Roots: An Intersection of Borders" exhibit.

In 2019, she was the third Efroymson Emerging Artist in Residence at the University of Michigan. That same year, her exhibit “Yo Tengo Nombre” was on display at the Institute for the Humanities Gallery at the University of Michigan. She was also featured at Presa House Gallery's 2019 Remember Me exhibit.
