= Esperanza Peace and Justice Center =

American nonprofit organization

- Formation: 1987; 39 years ago
- Headquarters: San Antonio, Texas
- Executive Director: Graciela Sanchez
- Website: esperanzacenter.org

The Esperanza Peace and Justice Center, founded in 1987, is a nonprofit organization established to advocate for LGBTQ rights, basic civil rights, and economic justice. Located in San Antonio, Texas, the Center also promotes cultural arts and works to preserve historic buildings in San Antonio’s West Side.

== Early years ==
The Center was founded in 1987 by a group of Chicana activists. In its early years, the movement was looking to unite peace movements not only in San Antonio, but in all of Texas. The Center opened with Susan Guerro as executive director, who worked out of a building at North Flores Street. In 1988, Graciela Sanchez became executive director after returning from film school in Cuba and she holds the position to this day.

Graciela Sanchez and The Esperanza Peace and Justice Center had rough times, particularly at the beginning. They were one of few who addressed the LGBTQ community and its issues, and for that reason they were looked down upon in many places. Graciela notes that they “suffered for it,” often times being kicked out of buildings and defunded by the city. They would later win a lawsuit against the city. A lot of Graciela’s fighting spirit is attributed to her family and their involvement in activism. Sanchez’s mother, Isabel, was well known for her advocation for children on the West Side and often she "held people accountable and spoke her mind." Also, Graciela's grandmother had a history of activism, going door-to-door asking neighbors to sign petitions for the city to provide electricity. Sanchez has felt the effects of this kind of work though, saying "The work at Esperanza has caused a lot of attacks towards [me] personally." But she has also noted the effects and impact that she has seen growing on a lot of young Mexican American children.

== Mission ==
Esperanza was established to advocate for LGBTQ rights, basic civil rights, and economic justice. The Center offers both cultural and arts programs, in addition to working to preserve historic buildings in San Antonio’s West Side. The name "Esperanza" was chosen as it is the Spanish word for "hope".

=== MujerArtes Studio ===
The MujerArtes Studio, also known as the MujerArtes Casita, it is a gallery which attracts thousands of visitors every year. It hosts occasions such as school/art fairs and libraries. Founded in 1995, the women mold clay into historic events of their lives as workers and their history as marginalized people in their environment.

=== Rinconcito de Esperanza ===
Translated to The Corner of Hope, it is the center of the movement and has grown since its first purchase, which was Casa de Cuentos, in 2002. Ruben's Ice House was established in 2007 and was a prominent gathering place and now renovations are being made.

== Personnel ==
Graciela Sanchez is the director of the Esperanza and has been since 1988. She was brought up in a household of women with strong, independent voices who also were into activism. Graciela and her staff work to create plans and programs that aid people of color, queer people and women, and people who survived cultural genocide. She helps spark up many uncomfortable conversations about race, sexuality, income, etc. She works with members on her staff and of the community to create programs like CineMujer; Uprooted: Tierra, Gente, y Cultura; and Palestinians and other Occupied Peoples.

Amelia Valdez is the Buena Gente Coordinator. She was born in San Antonio and graduated from the University of Michigan in 1989. She then started her career as the Director of Education for the Boys & Girls club of San Antonio, also being a part of staff and policy development. She was able to get funds for youth programs, even receiving recognition for her youth development. After her work at the Boys & Girls club, she then worked as a program specialist at the Girl Scouts of Southwest Texas and had a huge role in serving more girls in the inner city.

Kayla Miranda is a housing justice organizer in the westside of San Antonio. She is the tenant that led the fight for Alazan/Apache Courts which resulted in massive policy change, stopping the demolition of 501 public housing units and the displacement of over 1200 low income residents. Since then, she served on the Right to Counsel steering committee, the city's Strategic Housing Implementation Program (S.H.I.P) and several housing committees. In 2021, she was appointed to city's first ever Housing Bond Committee, securing millions of dollars in funding for extremely low income families in San Antonio. She is the director of Coalition for Tenant Justice, a impacted led collective fighting for tenants rights and serving the community. She was later appointed to the Building Standards Board. She is also involved in the creation of Escuelita de Paz y Justicia, a community based educational program that promotes social justice and healing, where she is a teacher. She writes for La Voz De Esperanza. She was elected by membership of Homes for All South, a part of Right to the City, to represent the South in national leadership and governance for Homes for All National. In 2024, she received the Texas Housers Award for advocacy and in 2026 she was appointed to the Opportunity Homes Commission, which replaced the SAHA Commission when the housing authority changed its name.

Susana Segura has been working with the Westside community since the founding of the Esperanza Peace and Justice Center in 1988. Her job title is the coordinator for the Arte es Vida Project Coordinator and also Barrio Historian. She has worked with social service agencies, labor organizations, health awareness services and cultural arts groups. Currently, she is working with the Esperanza to restore Lerma’s Nite Club, the longest running live conjunto music venue in the U.S. She is also involved with social, economic and environmental struggles around people of color, working class and LGBTQ community campaigns.
