= John Marshall High School (Leon Valley, Texas) =

High school in San Antonio, Texas, United States

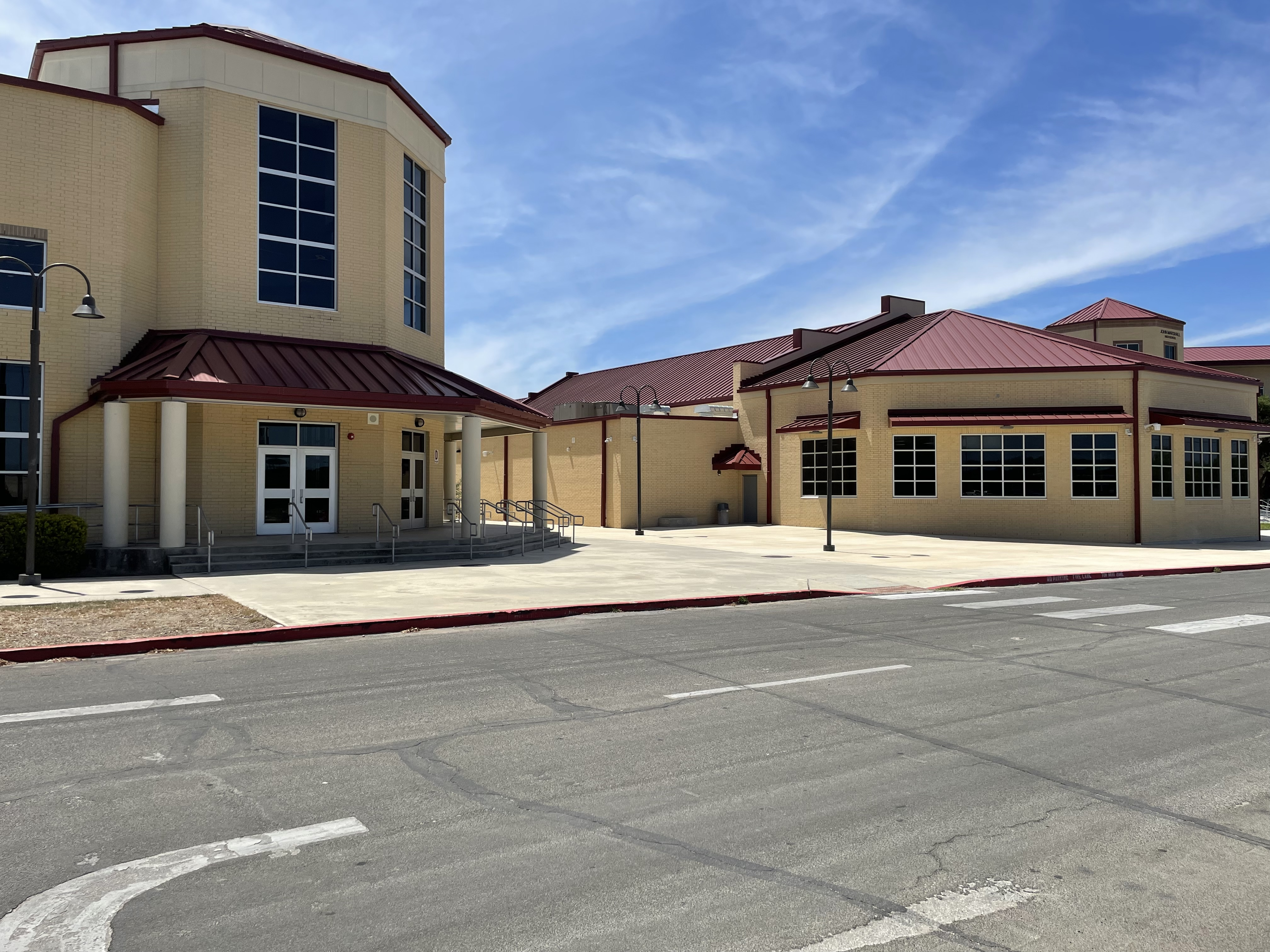

Location
- 8000 Lobo Lane; San Antonio (Leon Valley suburb), Bexar County, Texas 78240; United States
- Coordinates: 29°30′49″N 98°37′12″W

Information
- School type: Public, high school
- Founded: 1949
- Locale: Suburb: Large
- School district: Northside ISD
- NCES School ID: 483312003711
- Principal: Paul Ramirez
- Teaching staff: 168.34 (on an FTE basis)
- Grades: 9–12
- Enrollment: 2,587 (2023‍–‍2024)
- Student to teacher ratio: 15.37
- Language: English
- Colors: Maroon and white
- Athletics conference: UIL Class 6A
- Mascot: Ram
- Feeder schools: John B. Connally M.S. Pat Neff M.S. Coke R. Stevenson M.S. Earl Rudder M.S.
- Sports District: 28-6A
- Website: Official Website

John Marshall High School (JMHS) is a public secondary school in the San Antonio suburb of Leon Valley in northwest Bexar County named after Chief Justice John Marshall. The school serves students in grades 9-12, and is part of the Northside Independent School District, with admission based primarily on the locations of students' homes. The campus serves most of the suburb of Leon Valley and large portions of northwest San Antonio. Marshall was named a National Blue Ribbon School in 1992–93.

For the 2024–25 school year, Marshall received an overall rating of "D" from the Texas Education Agency.

== History ==
Marshall is the oldest high school in the Northside Independent School District, and was originally known simply as Northside High School from 1949 until 1960. In the fall of 1960, it was renamed John Marshall High School in honor of the fourth Chief Justice of the United States, John Marshall. The name change began a trend among Northside ISD high schools, all of which are named after U.S. Supreme Court Justices). The school mascot, the Ram, was picked by students in 1950 and was based on the NFL's Los Angeles Rams.

The school was once well known for its vocal music department, which had made sweepstakes in UIL over the past few decades.

The Ram Band has also been consistent sweepstakes winners. In 1976 the band set a world's record for continuous concert, performing 52 hours and 3 minutes in Wonderland Mall (now known as Wonderland of the Americas). That same year, the band became the first band from the state of Texas in 20 years to be invited to march in the 1977 Tournament of Roses Parade. The Ram Band also appeared in the 1977 feature film "Rolling Thunder". The first and second band directors at Marshall have had Northside Schools named for them; Mr. Bob Lewis, band director from 1957 to 1975 and Mr. Charles Kuentz Jr., band director from 1975 into the 1980s. Under direction of Kevin Tabb, the school has found success in indoor drumline competition, winning state championships for the first time in school history in 2022, and again in 2023. In August 2019, the Northside Independent School District opened Marshall Law and Medical Services Magnet School, a magnet school located within the campus. In late 2020, the magnet school's construction completed with a new three-story building (Building B) taking place of the old two-story Building B.

== Athletics ==
The Marshall Rams compete in these sports: Baseball, Basketball, Cross Country, Football, Golf, Soccer, Softball, Swimming and Diving, Tennis, Track and Field, Volleyball, and Water Polo.

In 1966 the John Marshall Basketball team won the State AAA championship, becoming the first and only sports team from John Marshall, in any sport to do so. John Marshall defeated League City Clear Creek, 64–60 in overtime at Gregory Gym, University of Texas. Coach Ted Dockery of Texas A&I (along with assistant coach Gary G. Haass) coached the state championship team. Wayne Doyal, (first team all state center) and Dennis Leach led the well balanced Ram team. Wayne Doyal later played for the University of Texas 1968–70.

== Attendance zone changes through the years ==
Because it's the oldest and the original high school for the Northside ISD, Marshall's originally very large attendance zones have been split through the years as new high schools were added to the district. Holmes H.S. to the south in the early 1960s, and Jay H.S. a few years later, although part of its area was also formed from the fairly new Holmes H.S. zone. In 1978 Marshall's zone was split again with the creation of Clark H.S. to the east, again in 1985 when Taft H.S. opened further west, and in 1998 when the new O'Connor H.S. claimed the Helotes and north Loop 1604 areas. The most recent attendance zone change was in 2008 for the new Brandeis H.S. whose zone is primarily made up of large areas of the former Clark and O'Connor attendance zones with a smaller area of Marshall's zone.

Though its attendance zones are much smaller than they were, Marshall still posts high academic scores and remains competitive in athletics, with the varsity football team winning the district title in 2006. Recently, Northside ISD attendance zones were realigned so that Marshall now has many former Clark H.S. neighborhoods that were originally zoned to Marshall, including those around the South Texas Medical Center, Prue Road, Fredericksburg Road and areas near the Wurzbach and I-10 intersection. Former O'Connor H.S. neighborhoods on Bandera Road were also rezoned back to Marshall due to realignment of other H.S. boundaries to accommodate record growth in the greater San Antonio area.

== Notable alumni ==
- Joe Castro (Class of 1988) — Special effects artist and film director
- Rita Crockett (Class of 1975) — Volleyball Olympian
- John Hagy (Class of 1984) — Professional football player.
- Priest Holmes (Class of 1992) — Professional football player.
- Will Hurd (Class of 1995) — Member of the United States House of Representatives.
- Genene Jones (Class of 1968) — Nurse and serial killer.
- N.D. Kalu (Class of 1993) — Professional football player.
- Shannon Lucio (Class of 1998) — Actress
- Jeff W. Mathis III (Class of 1974) — U.S. Army major general.
- Keith Sanderson (Class of 1993) — Sport shooter.
- Scott Solomon (Class of 2007) — Professional football player.
- Todd White (Class of 1988) — Animator and artist.
- Dusty Wolfe (Class of 1979) — Professional wrestler.
