= Al Rendon =

American photographer

Al Rendon is a San Antonio-born and based commercial and fine art photographer who is particularly interested in the Mexican heritage of his native city. Rendon's influences include scene and street photographers such as Tina Modotti, Manuel Álvarez Bravo, and Henri Cartier-Bresson. He has exhibited his work in the United States, Latin America, and China.

Rendon had a 50-year retrospective at the Witte Museum in San Antonio in 2023–24. Part of the Fotoseptiembre annual festival, it was curated by Bruce Shackelford and Katherine Nelson Hall.

== Photography career ==
Jack Morgan calls Rendon "one of San Antonio's longest-running photographers."

Rendon began taking pictures when he was around 12 years old, when his mother had difficulty using the viewfinder of her Instamatic camera. He quickly developed a liking for photography.

Rendon's first published photograph was a result of an assignment at Catholic Central High School. It was a "moody, spotlit image of 1972 Democratic presidential candidate George McGovern speaking in front of the Alamo." As the photographer noted, "it’s not about getting the most perfect picture … it’s more about having a vision and following through with it.” In 1973, he surreptitiously snapped a Led Zepplin concert. It led to work with Elton John and others.

As a photographer, Rendon's initial mainstay was photographing local rock bands. A well-received image of Ted Nugent brought him work with other famous musicians, such as Mick Jagger, Iggy Pop, and Stevie Ray Vaughan. He quickly branched out to other types of music, including blues guitarist Freddy King and various conjunto musicians.

Rendon developed a close association with the Fiesta Commission, becoming an official photographer for the annual Fiesta San Antonio celebration. He photographed the A Day in Old Mexico and the Charreada in 1981. Rendon became a regular photographer for the Guadalupe Cultural Arts Center's annual Tejano Conjunto Festival.

It was his work with the Guadalupe that enabled Rendon to resist the pressures he was under to assimilate into Anglo American society. He recalls: "When I was coming of age in the '60s, my family very strongly pushed me to learn English and not speak Spanish and to assimilate" As first-generation immigrants, there was pressure, "whether you were Mexican or American. I would play down being Mexican until I graduated high school. Not until I started working with the Guadalupe did I start to really get into Mexican culture."

Rendon calls the documentation of San Antonio "important", because "you’re talking about places and people that aren’t around anymore". Among the "lost" subjects is the Tejana singer Selena Quintanilla. Eduardo Diaz, acting deputy director of the Smithsonian National Museum of the American Latino, calls Rendon's 1993 portrait of her “the national portrait of Selena” (it is in the collection of the Smithsonian National Portrait Gallery).

One of Rendon's sorrowful commissions was documenting the murals in Uvalde that commemorate school children and teachers that were massacred in the local school shooting.

According to Nicholas Frank, the 61 images in Rendon's retrospective at the Witte Museum include "signature images of conjunto and rock musicians, Fiesta charros in action and other icons of San Antonio culture, including the ever-present Virgen de Guadalupe."

As an educational component, the exhibition included a simulated darkroom, with standard equipment because Rendon wanted visitors to visualize the evolution of photography, from black-and-white darkroom photography to the digital age. As he noted to Marco Acquino: "A lot of kids today are accustomed to taking pictures with their phones, and they aren't aware of the history and how much technology has changed since I started 50 years ago."

Tomás Ybarra Frausto, in a catalog essay, notes that Rendon's photographs "capture the special ambiente of the city as a multicultural metropolis." Rendon told Frank: “My culture is my family.” He added that he didn't mean just blood relatives, but "the family of San Antonio, the cultural institutions, the people, the artists, the politicians, the poets, the writers, they’re all important to our history.”

== Solo exhibitions ==
- "Culturas Mexico Americanas", Fotoseptiembre, Monterrey, Mexico, 1993.
- "Fragile, Romance… poetry by Gary S. Whitford", San Antonio Central Library, San Antonio, Texas, 1996.
- "The Art of Charreada", Foto Real Gallery, San Antonio, Texas, 1997.
- "State of Grace: 1987 Papal Mass in San Antonio", Centro Cultural Azltán, San Antonio, Texas, 1997.
- "The Art of Charreada", Institute of Texan Cultures, San Antonio, Texas, 1999.
- "The Art of Charreada", Cattle Raisers Museum, Fort Worth, Texas, 2000.
- "Images of Latin America in San Antonio, Texas", presentation at International Book fair in Caracas, Venezuela, sponsored by the U.S. Embassy, Centro Venezolano Americano, Mérida, Venezuela, 2000.
- "Puro Conjunto", Guadalupe Cultural Arts Center, San Antonio, Texas, 2001.
- "Angels, Devils and Saints", Las Manitas, Austin, Texas, 2002.
- "The Art of Charreada", Mexican Heritage Corporation, San Jose, California, 2003.
- "Colores del Rio", Artistic Endeavors, Fotoseptiembre, San Antonio, Texas, 2004.
- "Visions and Voices", Bullock State History Museum, Austin, Texas, 2005.
- "All Access: My RocknRoll", Rendon Photography & Fine Art, Fotoseptiembre, San Antonio, Texas, 2007.
- "La Cultura Trasciende Fronteras", Witte Museum, Fotoseptiembre, San Antonio, Texas, 2008.
- "Retratos", St. Philips College, Fotoseptiembre, San Antonio, Texas, 2010.
- "Timeless Icons", City of San Antonio International Center, San Antonio, Texas, 2014.
- "Stories & Metaphors", Cappy's Restaurant, Fotoseptiembre, San Antonio, Texas, 2016.
- "Edible Immigrants: Fruits and Vegetables of Mexico", Rendon Photography and Fine Art Gallery, Fotoseptiembre, San Antonio, Texas, 2018.
- "Patient Portraits: Faces of Resiliency", online Exhibit, Fotoseptiembre, San Antonio, Texas, 2021.
- "Mi Cultura: Bringing Shadows Into The Light: A Fifty Year Retrospective", Witte Museum, San Antonio, Texas, 2023–24.

== Public collections ==
- Museum of Fine Arts, Houston
- McNay Art Museum
- Smithsonian National Portrait Gallery
- Witte Museum
- Wittliff Collection at Texas State University

== Books ==
- A Century of Fiesta in San Antonio, by Jack Maguire, San Antonio Fiesta Commission, Eakin Press, 1991.
- Sights and Scenes of San Antonio, text by Gary S. Whitford, Gulf Publishing, 1995.
- Fiesta from A-Z, by Linda Sulser and Jeanne Schaefer, Fiesta Book Club, 1995.
- Puro Conjunto, ed. by Juan Tejeda & Avelardo Valdez, CMAS Books & Guadalupe Cultural Arts Center, 2001.
- Charreada, Mexican Rodeo in Texas, ed. by Francis E. Abernethy, University of North Texas Press, 2002.
- The Red McCombs English & Irish Silver Collection: Every Piece Tells a Story, Robert Underdahl and Thomas Sinsteden, University of Texas at San Antonio Institute of Texan Cultures, University of Texas Press, 2010.
- Painters in Pre-History (Archeology & Art of the Lower Pecos Canyon Lands), ed. by Harry J. Shafer, Trinity University Press in association with The Witte Museum, 2013.
- American Cool, by Joel Dinerstein and Frank H. Goodyear III, Delmonico Books/Prestel for the National Portrait Gallery, 2014.
- San Antonio, a Photographic Portrait, text by Gary S. Whitford, Twin Lights, 2017.
- The King William Area, a History and Guide to the Houses, by Mary V. Burkholder and Jessie N.M. Simpson, 2017.
- The Elderly as Historical Agents of their Dignity and Destiny, by Michael Candelaria, 2019.
- Faces of Resiliency, by WellMed Medical Management and WellMed Foundation, 2022.
- Phil Hardberger Park: A Story in Photographs, Phil Harberger Park Conservency, 2022.
- San Antonio: City on a Mission, by Henry Cisneros, Red McCombs & Catherine Nixon Cooke, Urban Renaissance Books, 2022.
- Mi Cultura: Bringing Shadows Into The Light: The Photography of Al Rendon, Witte Museum, 2023.
