= Gerald Lyda =

Texas Rancher & Building Contractor

Gerald Lyda (January 12, 1923 – November 14, 2005) was an American cattle rancher, contractor and developer from the state of Texas.

== Biography ==
Lyda was born in Burnet County at the edge of the Texas Hill Country in Central Texas. His grandfather was Gideon Paloris Lyda, who worked as a foreman on Thomas Lyons and Angus Campbell's LC Ranch near Silver City, New Mexico. Separated from his family aged 10 by his mother's death and the foreclosure on the family farm, Lyda worked for various ranches throughout the Texas Hill Country.

During World War II, Lyda worked for the railroad, but soon became a carpenter with a large El Paso–based general contractor, working on military projects throughout Texas, Utah and Colorado. Returning to Texas between construction jobs, he broke horses, worked as a ranch hand, occasionally competed in saddle bronc riding at small-town rodeos, and learned the art of saddle-making.

Lyda married Randa Jean Lyda and moved to Nixon, Texas, to manage the Evans Ranch. To support his family, he quit working as a cowboy in 1947 and was hired as a carpenter with Farnsworth & Chambers, a large building contractor with headquarters in Houston, working under supervisor/mentor H. Alvin Lott. In late 1954, the 31-year-old Lyda was transferred to San Antonio to be project superintendent for the construction of Wilford Hall Hospital at Lackland Air Force Base. After the hospital was completed on time and within budget, he was promoted to Area Superintendent.

In 1960, Lyda formed his own construction company, Darragh & Lyda, with Burnet County rancher Steinmetz Darragh. In the mid-1960s, a joint venture between the San Antonio–based company and H. A. Lott Inc. built the Tower of the Americas, and most of the major HemisFair '68 structures in San Antonio.

The Lyda organization grew to be a major Texas general contractor, carrying out such projects as the Alamodome, the expansion of the University of Texas Memorial Stadium, the Hyatt Hill Country Resort Hotel, the San Antonio Convention Center, the Westin La Cantera Resort Hotel and the Fiesta Texas theme park, as well as hospitals, hotels, banks and office buildings. The company and its subsidiaries were ranked among the Top 400 Contractors by Engineering News-Record, and were consistently ranked among the top three commercial building contractors in San Antonio, based on billings, by the San Antonio Business Journal. In 2003, Lyda sold Lyda Constructors Inc., the 100% owned subsidiary of Lyda Inc., to Swinerton, Inc. of San Francisco.

== Later life and death ==
After the sale, Lyda retired to his 220,000-acre La Escalera Ranch south of Fort Stockton, Texas. By 1999, he had owned or traded more than 880,000 acres (3600 km²) of ranch real estate, including the large Ladder Ranch in southeastern New Mexico, which he eventually sold to Ted Turner and Jane Fonda.

Lyda died in 2005. His sons and daughter manage the La Escalera Ranch, which spreads across four Texas counties, and has been ranked by Texas Monthly, The Land Report, and Worth magazine as one of the largest cattle ranches in the United States. One of his sons, Gene, was a professional bull rider in his youth.
