= Somerset High School (Texas) =

Location
- 7650 South Loop 1604 West; Somerset, Bexar County, Texas 78069; United States; 29.229189°N 98.651789°W

Information
- Type: Public high school
- School district: Somerset Independent School District
- NCES School ID: 484074004623
- Principal: Cynthia Gamez
- Staff: 76.75 (on an FTE basis)
- Grades: 9–12
- Enrollment: 1,150 (2023–2024)
- Student to teacher ratio: 14.98
- Colors: Blue and white
- Athletics conference: Class 5A
- Team name: Bulldogs
- Website: Official website

Somerset High School is a public high school located in Somerset, Texas, southwest of San Antonio, Texas. It is one of two high schools in the Somerset Independent School District, the other being Shirleen Zacharias Early College Leadership Academy (ZECLA), and is classified as a 5A school by the UIL. For the 2024-2025 school year, the school was given a "C" by the Texas Education Agency.

== Athletics ==
The Somerset Bulldogs compete in the following sports:

- Baseball
- Basketball
- Cross Country
- Football
- Golf
- Powerlifting
- Soccer
- Softball
- Tennis
- Track and Field
- Volleyball
