= John Jay High School =

John Jay High School may refer to:

In New York

- John Jay High School (Cross River, New York), in Westchester County
- John Jay High School (Hopewell Junction, New York), in Dutchess County
- John Jay Educational Campus (Brooklyn), formerly the location of John Jay High School

In Texas

- John Jay High School (San Antonio)
