= The Rap Year Book =

Book by Shea Serrano

The Rap Year Book: The Most Important Rap Song From Every Year Since 1979, Discussed, Debated, and Deconstructed
- First edition
- Author: Shea Serrano
- Illustrator: Arturo Torres
- Language: English
- Subject: Hip hop
- Genre: Music criticism, music history
- Publisher: Abrams Image
- Publication date: October 13, 2015
- Publication place: United States
- Media type: Paperback
- Pages: 240
- ISBN: 1-4197-1818-5
- Website: https://www.abramsbooks.com/product/rap-year-book_9781419718182/

The Rap Year Book: The Most Important Rap Song From Every Year Since 1979, Discussed, Debated, and Deconstructed is a 2015 New York Times best-selling book written by Shea Serrano and illustrated by Arturo Torres.

== Development ==
The Rap Year Book followed Serrano's 2013 project with Houston rapper Bun B, Bun B's Rap Coloring and Activity Book. The Rap Year Book took 15 months to develop, and was still without an illustrator three months before the book's due date. Serrano encountered eventual collaborator Torres via a flyer Torres had designed announcing a performance by Dallas rap group The Outfit, Texas; Serrano told Texas Monthly that on seeing Torres's work, he thought immediately, "This is the exact style that I’m trying to find." Serrano contacted the group's management asking for information about who had made their flyer and eventually tracked Torres down on social media; Torres agreed to work on the book.

== Publication ==
The Rap Year Book was published on October 13, 2015, by Abrams Image. It is 240 pages with 150 full-color illustrations.

== Format ==
The book is structured around essays by Serrano selecting the most important rap song for every year from 1979 to 2014. His text is accompanied by illustrations by Torres, "bright, colorful, and offbeat cartoons...featuring depictions of Kanye and Jay-Z on a movie poster, Dr. Dre in scrubs, Drake using a pottery wheel, and more." Ice-T wrote the book's preface, and critics, including Wesley Morris and Jessica Hopper, contributed short rebuttals arguing for alternative choices as the most important song of a given year.

== Reception ==
=== Sales ===
Propelled by Serrano's engagement with his enthusiastic Twitter following, The Rap Year Book repeatedly ranked on 2015 The New York Times best-seller lists. The book's first pressing of 20,000 copies sold out in pre-orders before The Rap Year Book even hit shelves; a mock "feud" on Twitter between Serrano and Books-A-Million sold out the retailer's stock of the book in one day, and crashed the company's website in the process.

=== Reviews ===
PopMatters reviewed the book as "both educationally useful and shamelessly fun...tailor-made to counter every criticism levied against routine, overly generalized music retrospectives." In the Los Angeles Review of Books, Oliver Wang said that while Serrano's essays take a position on what constitutes the most important song of each year, "he doesn’t browbeat his reader into agreement; he writes confidently but not condescendingly. More importantly, the main pleasure in reading The Rap Year Book isn’t in agreeing with Serrano’s choices but rather in following the elliptical paths he takes to explain them."

== Adaptation ==
In July 2017, Serrano announced that AMC would produce The Rap Year Book as a 6-part television documentary series with The Roots as executive producers.
