= Somerset, Texas =

City in Bexar County, Texas, United States

- City
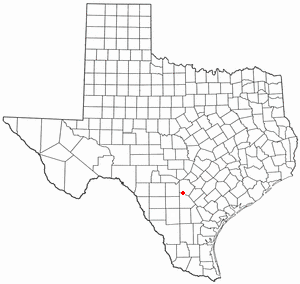
- Location of Somerset, Texas

- Coordinates: 29°13′37″N 98°39′27″W
- Country: United States
- State: Texas
- County: Bexar

Area
  - Total: 2.00 sq mi (5.19 km^{2})
  - Land: 2.00 sq mi (5.17 km^{2})
  - Water: 0.0077 sq mi (0.02 km^{2})
- Elevation: 646 ft (197 m)

Population (2020)
  - Total: 1,756
  - Density: 984/sq mi (379.8/km^{2})
- Time zone: UTC-6 (Central (CST))
  - Summer (DST): UTC-5 (CDT)
- ZIP code: 78069
- Area code: 830
- FIPS code: 48-68708
- GNIS feature ID: 1368603
- ANSI Code: 2411926
- Website: www.somersettx.gov

Somerset is a city in Bexar County, Texas, United States. It is located less than 20 miles south of downtown San Antonio and is part of the San Antonio–New Braunfels metropolitan area. Its population was 1,756 at the 2020 census.

== History ==
English-speaking European settlers had already arrived in the area by the early 1800s. Somerset was named for an organized settlement that had been begun in 1848, in what is now Atascosa County, by a group of Baptist families from Somerset, Kentucky. The present site was named Somerset when the First Townsite Company was formed on the Artesian Belt Railroad right-of-way on May 25, 1909, by A. M. Pyron, Carl Kurz, and Jonas A. Kerr.

In 1913, while drilling for artesian water, Kurz discovered oil and an economic boom followed. The Somerset oilfield extended from Somerset to below Pleasanton and was the largest known shallow field in the world at that time. Two oil refineries in the field and a pipeline into San Antonio handled the high-gravity crude.

The town grew rapidly from 50 residents in 1925 to 700 in 1928; it was served by a state bank, a 10-room hotel, and several machine and blacksmith shops. A post office opened there in 1920. A nearby lignite coal mine also added to the booming economy of the area.

During the 1920s, farmers turned from cotton to dryland fruit and vegetable farming. In 1931, the Somerset Fruit Growers Exchange building was dedicated, and between truck farming, oil, and coal, the town prospered until the mid-1930s, when diminishing oil returns and the Great Depression caused a decline. In 1931, the town reported 20 businesses; by 1958, only eight remained.

In 1920, the Somerset Independent School District was formed from at least five other school districts: Wildman, Senior, Bexar, Old Rock (Old Somerset area), and Oak Island. The Somerset Police Department was created in 1972 followed by the city being incorporated in 1973. Somerset has a mayor-council form of city government.

== Geography ==
According to the United States Census Bureau, Somerset has a total area of 2.0 square miles (5.2 km^{2}), all land.

== Demographics ==
Historical population
Census	Pop.	Note	%±
1980	1,102		—
1990	1,144		3.8%
2000	1,550		35.5%
2010	1,631		5.2%
2020	1,756		7.7%
U.S. Decennial Census

=== 2020 census ===
As of the 2020 census, Somerset had a population of 1,756, a median age of 35.1 years, 26.2% of residents under the age of 18, and 13.8% of residents 65 years of age or older. For every 100 females there were 94.9 males, and for every 100 females age 18 and over there were 88.4 males age 18 and over.

0.0% of residents lived in urban areas, while 100.0% lived in rural areas.

There were 591 households in Somerset, of which 43.8% had children under the age of 18 living in them. Of all households, 48.1% were married-couple households, 15.6% were households with a male householder and no spouse or partner present, and 31.3% were households with a female householder and no spouse or partner present. About 21.0% of all households were made up of individuals and 11.0% had someone living alone who was 65 years of age or older.

There were 639 housing units, of which 7.5% were vacant. The homeowner vacancy rate was 1.0% and the rental vacancy rate was 5.2%.

Racial composition as of the 2020 census
Race	Number	Percent
White	870	49.5%
Black or African American	1	0.1%
American Indian and Alaska Native	9	0.5%
Asian	3	0.2%
Native Hawaiian and Other Pacific Islander	0	0.0%
Some other race	408	23.2%
Two or more races	465	26.5%
Hispanic or Latino (of any race)	1,402	79.8%

=== 2000 census ===
As of the 2000 census, 1,550 people, 513 households, and 392 families were living in the city. The population density was 773.7 inhabitants per square mile (298.7/km^{2}). The 547 housing units had an average density of 273.0 per square mile (105.4/km^{2}). The racial makeup of the city was 77.16% White, 0.26% African American, 1.55% Native American, 0.19% Pacific Islander, 16.00% from other races, and 4.84% from two or more races. Hispanics or Latinos of any race were 70.45% of the population.

Of the 513 households, 42.5% had children under 18 living with them, 54.2% were married couples living together, 15.6% had a female householder with no husband present, and 23.4% were not families. About 21.1% of all households were made up of individuals, and 11.5% had someone living alone who was 65 or older. The average household size was 3.02 and the average family size was 3.51.

In the city, the age distribution was 32.5% under 18, 9.2% from 18 to 24, 29.7% from 25 to 44, 16.7% from 45 to 64, and 11.9% who were 65 or older. The median age was 31 years. For every 100 females, there were 98.5 males. For every 100 females 18 and over, there were 93.9 males.

The median income for a household in the city was $30,268, and for a family was $31,875. Males had a median income of $27,083 versus $20,357 for females. The per capita income for the city was $11,238. About 22.0% of families and 23.2% of the population were below the poverty line, including 28.6% of those under 18 and 26.6% of those 65 or over.

== Education ==
Residents are zoned to schools in the Somerset Independent School District.

== See also ==
- List of municipalities in Texas
