= Maulana Azad National Institute of Technology =

Public technical university in Madhya Pradesh, India

Maulana Azad National Institute of Technology Bhopal
- Other names: National Institute of Technology, Bhopal
- Former names: Maulana Azad College of Technology; Regional Engineering College, Bhopal
- Motto in English: Education is our soul wealth
- Type: Public technical university
- Established: 4 September 1960; 65 years ago
- Endowment: Ministry of Education, Government of India
- Chairperson: Arvind A. Natu
- Director: Karunesh Kumar Shukla
- Faculty: 308
- Students: 5014
- Undergraduates: 4017
- Postgraduates: 917
- Doctoral students: 80
- Location: Bhopal, Madhya Pradesh, India; 23.2136°N 77.3997°E
- Campus: Urban, spread over 650 acres (2.6 km^{2})
- Language: English
- Website: www.manit.ac.in

The Maulana Azad National Institute of Technology Bhopal (MANIT or NIT Bhopal or NIT-B) is a public technical university located in Bhopal, Madhya Pradesh, India. It is part of a group of publicly funded institutions in India known as National Institutes of Technology. It is named after the Independent India's first Minister of Education (India), scholar and independence activist Maulana Abdul Kalam Azad who is commonly remembered as Maulana Azad.

Established in the year 1960 as Maulana Azad College of Technology (MACT) or Regional Engineering College (REC), Bhopal, it became a National Institute of Technology in 2002 and was recognised as an Institute of National Importance under the NIT Act in 2007. The institute is fully funded by Ministry of Education, Government of India and is governed by the NIT Council.

It offers bachelor's, master's and doctoral degrees in science, technology, engineering, architecture and management.

== History ==
MANIT was started in 1960 as Maulana Azad College of Technology (MACT), named after the first Minister of Education of India, Maulana Abul Kalam Azad. MACT started functioning in 1960 at Govt S.V. Polytechnic with an intake of 120 students and seven faculty members. It was one of the first out of eight Regional Engineering Colleges started during the second five-year plan (1956–1960) in India, where the main focus was development of the public sector and rapid industrialisation.

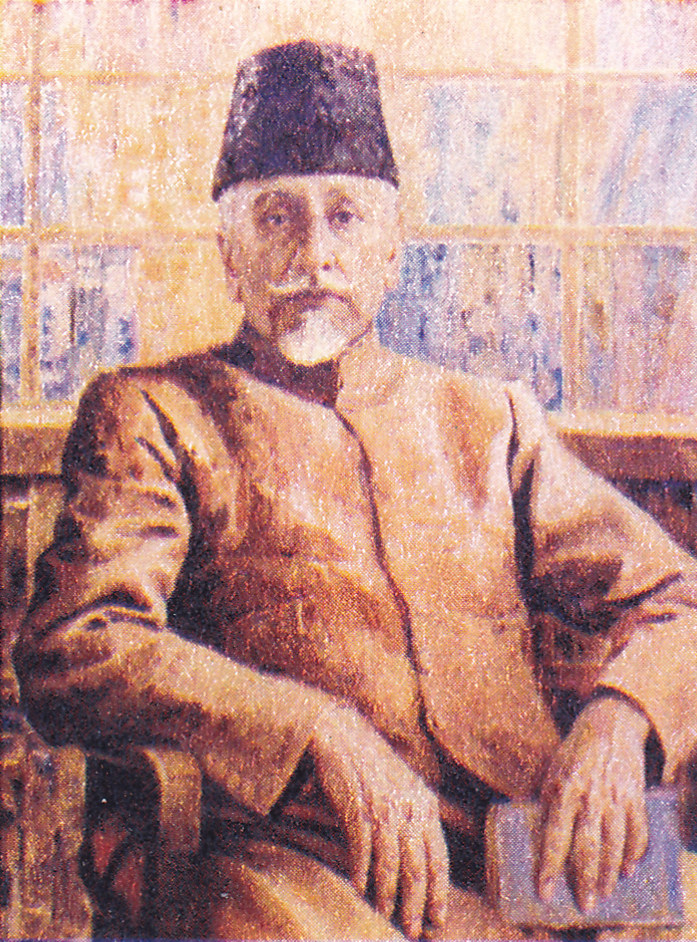
The institute was named after Maulana Abul Kalam Azad

To ensure enough supply of trained personnel to meet the demand of rapid industrialisation, a decision was taken to start the Regional Engineering Colleges (RECs), one in each major state of India to churn out graduates with good engineering merit. Thus a total of seventeen RECs were established 1959 onwards, one in each major state of India. Each college was a joint and cooperative enterprise of the central government and the concerned state government. MACT was one of the first eight REC's to be established in each region in India. It was established in the Western Region along with Visvesvaraya National Institute of Technology, Nagpur and Sardar Vallabhbhai National Institute of Technology, Surat.

It started operating in the premises of "Swami Vivekananda Polytechnic" Bhopal. Mr. S. R. Beedkar, Principal of Swami Vivekananda Polytechnic was appointed as the planning officer of the institute. The foundation stone of the Institute building was laid by the then Prime Minister of India Pandit Jawaharlal Nehru on 23 April 1961. The Institute gradually progressed to become a high level education center with steady development of infrastructure as well as academics. J. N. Moudgill became the first principal of MACT in 1962. Five years degree programs in Civil Engineering, Mechanical Engineering and Electrical Engineering were started in 1962 itself. In 1963, the five-year program of Bachelor of Architecture was started as well. In 1964, the institute was shifted to its own building which is its present campus. As the necessity of science and technology kept on growing, more undergraduate programs kept on getting added like: Electronics and Communications Engineering in 1972; Computer Science and Engineering in 1986; 3-year Master of Computer Applications (MCA) in 1988 and Information Technology in 2001 (which was later merged with "Computer Science and Engineering" in 2013).

The success of technology-based industry led to high demand for technical and scientific education. During the Premiership of Atal Bihari Vajpayee, the then Minister of Human Resource Development, Murli Manohar Joshi decided to upgrade all "Regional Engineering Colleges" to "National Institutes of Technology" that shall be funded by the Central Government itself. Hence, in 2002, all REC's became NIT's and MACT became Maulana Azad National Institute of Technology (MANIT). In the same year, MANIT was granted deemed university status. With this advancement, the World Bank assisted "Technical Education Quality Improvement Program" started in 2003, for the rapid academic and infrastructural growth of the college. In addition to engineering programs, an MBA program as well commenced from 2006. The Government of India in 2007 passed the NIT Act as per which MANIT was declared an Institute of National Importance.

== Campus ==
MANIT is spread over 650 acres (260 ha) which makes it one of the largest NITs in India in terms of total campus area. The entire campus consists of administrative and academic buildings, workshops, library and community centers, residential accommodations for students and staff and other general amenities such as Post Office, a Digital Library, a Bank with ATM, Shopping complex, a School for children, medical care unit, an auditorium with the capacity of 1000 persons and sports complex with vast expand of open area. An official branch of the State Bank of India also operates from the main campus. The campus is divided into four sectors. These sectors have the following facilities/features:-

=== Academic sector ===
- Total area of academic block 265 hectares (650 acres)
- Total building area of offices 250 m^{2} (2,700 sq ft)
- Computer center
- Dispensary
- Sarvepalli Radhakrishnan Auditorium with a seating capacity of 1000 persons
- Institute Cafeteria, Amul parlour, Nescafé huts, Teology, Neelam fast food corner, fast food court
- Gymnastic hall
- Football ground, Track and field's ground; cricket ground, basketball grounds and volleyball court
- Sports complex with indoor games facilities such as table tennis, chess and carrom room, badminton courts, and meditation hall

=== Hostel sector ===
- Built-in area of hostels 14,011 m^{2} (150,810 sq ft)}
- 9 Boys + 1 NRI Boys Hostels (hostel no. 1–12, except hostel no. 7 & 12)
- 2 Girls Hostels (hostel no. 7 and 12)

=== Residential area ===
- Built-in area of staff quarters 25,116 m^{2} (270,350 sq ft)
- Total 369 staff quarters
- Children park
- Officers club
- Artificial lake "Lotus Lake" and MANIT Boat Club

=== Visitor accommodation ===
- Faculty/officer quarters
- Bachelor flats
- Dormitories
- VIP Guest House
- Faculty Guest House

== Organisation and administration ==
=== Governance ===
The NIT Council is the governing body of India's National Institutes of Technology (NIT) system. The NIT Council consists of Board of Governors of the concerned NIT.

=== Departments ===
MANIT has various academic departments with a wide range of courses. The department at MANIT are as follows:

- Architecture and Planning
- Engineering:
  - Biological Science and Engineering
  - Civil Engineering
  - Chemical Engineering
  - Computer Science and Engineering
  - Electrical Engineering
  - Electronics and Communication Engineering
  - Mechanical Engineering
  - Material Science and Metallurgical Engineering
- Science:
  - Physics
  - Chemistry
  - Mathematics
    - Applied Mathematics
    - Bioinformatics
    - Computer Applications
- Humanities
- Management Studies

== Academics ==
=== Academic programs ===
MANIT offers the following undergraduate, postgraduate and doctoral degrees:

- Bachelor of Technology
- Bachelor of Architecture
- Bachelor of Planning
- Master of Technology
- Master of Business Administration
- Master of Planning
- Doctor of Philosophy (PhD)
- Master of Computer Applications

All course work and examinations for all majors and subjects are conducted in English.

=== Admissions ===
Admission to undergraduate courses is through the national level engineering entrance examination – through the Joint Entrance Examination - Main. The selection is very tough as only top 5% of the applicant are able to secure admissions. Prior to the start of JEE Main, admission to MANIT was through the All India Engineering Entrance Examination (AIEEE) until 2013.

For NRI's and foreign nationals, the admission is conducted through DASA (Direct Admissions for Students Abroad) where a qualifying score of the SAT Subject Test in Physics, Chemistry and Mathematics is required. Other than DASA, scholarships programs for admission are provided through the Indian Council for Cultural Relations. Students from different countries such as Afghanistan, Bangladesh, Bhutan, Nepal, Sri Lanka, Kuwait, Saudi Arabia, Qatar, Oman, UAE etc. take admission into the institute every year.

Students for postgraduate programs are selected through Graduate Aptitude Test in Engineering for the M.Tech. program and through NIT MCA Common Entrance Test for the MCA program. Admission to the MBA program is through the Common Admission Test.

=== Ranking ===
University rankings

Engineering – India
- NIRF (2024): 72

Architecture – India
- NIRF (2024): 17

MANIT is ranked 72nd among the engineering colleges of India by National Institutional Ranking Framework (NIRF) in 2024.

== Notable alumni ==
- Ajit Jogi - first chief minister of Chhattisgarh; member of the Indian National Congress
- P. C. Sharma - Cabinet Minister of Madhya Pradesh State Government (Law and Legal Affairs Department, Public Relations Department, Science and Technology Department, Department of Civil Aviation)
- Rambabu Kodali - pro-vice chancellor of Kalinga Institute of Industrial Technology
- Suresh Pachouri - veteran member of the Indian National Congress
- Naveen Polishetty - Indian actor works in the Telugu films
- Rajeev Verma - noted Indian film and television actor
- Satish Kumar Sharma - chairman and managing director of Nuclear Power Corporation of India
- Santosh Choubey - founder and chairman AISECT and chancellor AISECT Group of Universities including Rabindranath Tagore University

== See also ==
- List of educational institutions in Bhopal
- List of institutions of higher education in Madhya Pradesh
- List of National Institutes of Technology in India
