= William C. Waterhouse =

American mathematician (1941–2016)

- Born: December 31, 1941; Galveston, Texas, U.S.
- Died: June 26, 2016 (aged 74); State College, Pennsylvania, U.S.
- Education: Harvard University
- Awards: Lester R. Ford Award (1984, 1995)
- Scientific career
- Fields: Mathematics
- Workplaces: Pennsylvania State University; Cornell University
- Thesis: Abelian Varieties over Finite Fields (1968)
- Doctoral advisor: John Tate

William Charles Waterhouse (December 31, 1941 – June 26, 2016) was an American mathematician. He was a professor emeritus of Mathematics at Pennsylvania State University, after having taught there for over 35 years. The early part of his career was at Cornell University. His research interests included abstract algebra, number theory, group schemes, and the history of mathematics.

== Early life and education ==
Waterhouse was born in Galveston, Texas, on December 31, 1941, the son of William T. Waterhouse and Grace D. Waterhouse, but grew up in Denver, Colorado. His father was an engineer who was employed with the United States Bureau of Reclamation.

He attended East High School in Denver. In a high school mathematics competition spanning the states of Colorado, South Dakota, and Wyoming, he received the highest score in the competition's history and helped his school gain the top mark. As a senior, he took the Scholastic Aptitude Test and received a near-perfect 797 on the verbal portion and a perfect 800 on the math portion. He then received perfect 800 scores on three different college board Achievement Tests, those for English Composition, for Chemistry, and for advanced Mathematics, a feat that the Associated Press filed a story about and that ran in a number of newspapers around the country. Time magazine ran a profile of him as well. Waterhouse received the National Merit Scholarship and the General Motors Scholarship; he graduated from East High in 1959.

Waterhouse attended Harvard College. There he was a standout in the Putnam Competition: As a sophomore in the 1960 competition, he was not part of Harvard's three-person team that finished second overall, but he did achieve a top-ten individual mark; as a junior in the 1961 competition, he attained the highest individual level – a top-five score – while helping his Harvard team to a fourth-place finish overall; and as a senior in the 1962 competition, he again was a Putnam Fellow with a top-five score and helped his Harvard team to a third-place finish overall.

After graduating from Harvard College with a bachelor's degree summa cum laude and being elected to Phi Beta Kappa, Waterhouse continued at Harvard Graduate School of Arts and Sciences where he received a master's degree. While in the graduate school, he was awarded a National Science Foundation Fellowship. He then received his Ph.D. in 1968 from Harvard for his thesis Abelian Varieties over Finite Fields under the supervision of John Tate.

== Career ==
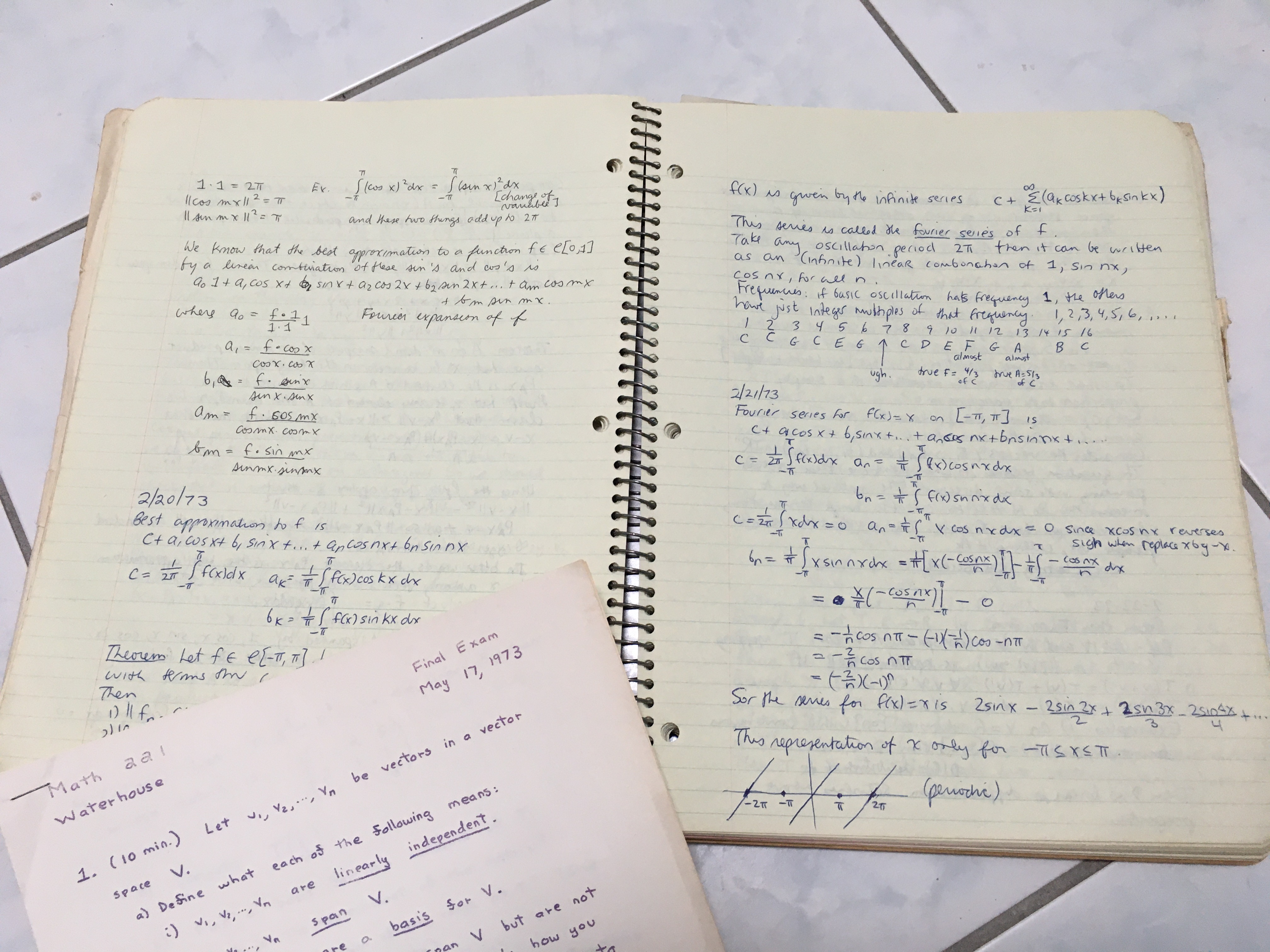
Student's notebook pages from a 1973 calculus class at Cornell showing Waterhouse illustrating the applicability of Fourier series to music theory by singing notes and commenting on their harmonics

Waterhouse began teaching at Cornell University in 1968.

He had a career-long interest in the history of mathematics, and while at Cornell wrote a history of the early years of that university's Oliver Club, a discussion forum begun by pioneering Cornell mathematician James Edward Oliver in the 1890s.

Waterhouse remained an assistant professor at Cornell until 1975, at which point he was appointed an associate professor at Penn State. At Penn State, he subsequently became a full professor.

In 1980 he married Betty Ann Senk, a doctoral student and teacher in comparative literature at Penn State. They lived in State College, Pennsylvania.

According to his obituary published in the Centre Daily Times, during his career Waterhouse published over 250 articles in scholarly journals and other publications. He was the author of the 1979 textbook Introduction to Affine Group Schemes for Springer-Verlag. Telegraphic Reviews characterized the work as a "fairly intuitive and accessible" development of the topic, suitable for second-year graduate students. In a 1986 volume for Springer-Verlag, he edited the 1966 translation by Arthur A. Clarke of Gauss's Disquisitiones Arithmeticae. Waterhouse and his wife collaborated on several translations of works by German mathematicians. He was a member of the Mathematical Association of America and the American Mathematical Society.

Waterhouse long had an interest in classical studies; as such, he was a member of the Classical Association of the Middle West and South. He published a number of entries about language- and classics-focused matters in the journal Notes and Queries, as well as, in the journal Classical World, an exegesis of an unusual word form found in Ovid's Amores. Waterhouse also had an interest in investigating quotations, whether via a Usenet newsgroup or publishing with The Skeptics Society.

By 2012, Waterhouse had moved to emeritus status.

Waterhouse died on June 26, 2016, in State College, Pennsylvania.

== Awards and honors ==
Waterhouse twice won the Lester R. Ford Award of the Mathematical Association of America, given to authors of articles of expository excellence. The first was in 1984 for his paper "Do Symmetric Problems Have Symmetric Solutions?" and the second was in 1995 for his paper "A Counterexample for Germain". The latter has been characterized as "a historical and mathematical detective story" that investigated an aspect of the correspondence between Carl Friedrich Gauss and Sophie Germain, a French mathematician who used a pseudonym to disguise the fact that she was a woman. According to his obituary, Waterhouse had a special pride in having won the two Lester R. Ford Awards.
