= Achievement Test in English Composition =

Standardized test in the United States

The Achievement Test in English Composition, later SAT II: Writing, was a one-hour standardized test given on English composition by the College Entrance Examination Board as part of college admissions in the United States. A student chose whether to take the test depending upon the entrance requirements for the schools in which the student was planning to apply. Historically it was the most frequently taken of any of the College Board's Achievement Tests.

As with other achievement tests, the test in English Composition was only required by more selective colleges. This was especially true of competitive admission schools in the Eastern United States, such as those in the Ivy League. In 1969, for instance, the Achievement Test in English Composition test was required for applications to Columbia College of Columbia University and to Jackson College of Tufts University, along with two other achievement tests of the applicant's choosing. Even technology-focused schools such as the Massachusetts Institute of Technology and Rensselaer Polytechnic Institute required it, along with also requiring the Achievement Test in Mathematics Level II and the Achievement Test in Chemistry or Achievement Test in Physics.

== Format ==
As of 1971, the test had five different kinds of multiple-choice questions that might be asked. One involved identifying ungrammatical parts of a sentence, if any; a second involved choosing the best way to reword a phrase or sentence to make it grammatical; a third involved identifying what classification of error (e.g. diction, grammar, usage) is present, if any; a fourth involved choosing from several textual alternatives that could complete a paragraph, and identifying what would be wrong with the other alternatives; and a fifth involved revising existing text while maintaining grammatical correctness.

Often considered was whether the English composition test should be solely multiple-choice or whether there should be an essay component added to it. The very first College Entrance Examination Board tests, devised in 1900, included an English test that involved giving one- or two-paragraph answers to questions regarding a published list of works of literature or volumes of essays; of these answers, the board said: "In every case knowledge of the book will be regarded as less important than the ability to write good English." Once the Achievement Test came into being, an early version of an essay format was used for several years in the 1950s and then dropped. An essay was incorporated again from 1963 to 1971, of twenty minutes' duration, during one undisclosed testing date each year. For the 1971–72 academic year, the test came in several different forms, some with a twenty-minute essay and some without, with students not told which form they would get ahead of time. An essay component was re-added for 1977, with it again being twenty minutes of the hour-long test. In 1990, there was an announcement that an essay component would replace most or all of the test, in lieu of adding an essay to the SAT proper.

The argument in favor of incorporating an essay component was that it was essential in evaluating a student's writing ability. As one educator from Iowa said in 1976, "Selecting the correct answer from five different answers is different from actually writing a sentence and properly punctuating it." The primary arguments against having an essay were that twenty minutes was too short a time to compose and write something of quality and that it was difficult to grade essays in a consistent manner. In addition, giving and grading essays was a more expensive testing regimen for the College Board to conduct.

== Scoring ==
The lowest score on this exam was a 200 with the highest being 800. Students were permitted to take this exam more than once to try to improve their scores.

For 1971, the mean score on the test was 512. A score of 750 represented the 99th percentile, 700 the 96th percentile, 600 the 78th percentile, 500 the 47th percentile, and 400 the 15th percentile.

== End ==
In 1994, the Achievement Tests as a whole were renamed to the SAT II tests and the Achievement Test in English Composition was renamed to the SAT II: Writing test. The essay component was used, and for the first time the graded essays would be handed back to the student.

Then in 2005, the English Composition/Writing material was subsumed into SAT itself, and the achievement test/SAT II in the subject was no more.

== See also ==
- SAT
- SAT Subject Tests
- PSAT/NMSQT
