= SAT Subject Test in World History =

College Board one-hour multiple choice test

The SAT Subject Test in World History was the name of a one-hour multiple choice test given on World History by the College Board. A student chose to take it depending on a college's entrance requirements. Until 1994, the SAT Subject Tests were known as Achievement Tests; and from 1995 until January 2005, they were known as SAT IIs. The SAT World History was not taken frequently. Fewer than 17,000 students in 2015 took this test, compared to the over-110,000 students who took the United States History Subject Test. On January 19 2021, the College Board discontinued all SAT Subject tests, including the SAT Subject Test in World History. This was effective immediately in the United States, and the tests were to be phased out by the following summer for international students. This was done as a response to changes in college admissions due to the impact of the COVID-19 pandemic on education.

== Format ==
This test had exactly 95 questions that are to be answered in one hour. Students received one point for a correct answer, received zero points for a blank answer, and lost 1/4 of a point for a wrong answer. There were no sections in this test, and so students had to answer 95 multiple choice questions without section breaks or rest periods.

Chronology of the Test

Prehistory to 500 C.E.	25%
500-1500 C.E.	20%
1500-1900 C.E	25%
Post-1900 C.E.	20%
Cross-chronological	10%

Geography of the Test

Global or Comparative	25%
Europe	25%
Southwest Asia	10%
Africa	10%
East Asia	10%
South and Southeast Asia	10%
The Americas (excluding the U.S.)	10%

The types of questions they have included specific recall of facts, events, or historical knowledge. Cause and effect questions were on the test as well. Students were also required to understand major historical developments, such as modernization, imperialization, explain the developments through events and other circumstances, as well as how the events happened. Some questions included material on how historians perform historical research and analysis. Finally, a very small minority of the questions tested historical interpretation of primary source material. These questions tended to be very rare, and a student typically could expect 6-8 at most on this 95 question test.

== Preparation ==
The College Board recommended a one-year preparatory course in World History, as well as independent reading on material related to historical content. However, the questions were very similar to the AP World History Exam, and it was recommended a student do significant outside study by reading and working questions from a commercially available SAT World History, an AP World History preparation book, various online test preparation resources, or an AP Textbook if that student had not taken an AP course in World History.

== Resources ==
The student was not allowed to use any notes, textbooks, or any communications device during this test. A student was only allowed to use a Number 2 Pencil with an eraser for this exam, and nothing else. The number 2 pencil with the eraser must have been brought by the student, as the testing center usually did not provide any.

== See also ==
- SAT
- SAT Subject Tests
- PSAT/NMSQT
