= SAT Subject Test in Biology E/M =

Standardized test in the United States

The SAT Subject Test in Biology was the name of a one-hour multiple choice test given on biology by the College Board. A student chose whether to take the test depending upon college entrance requirements for the schools in which the student is planning to apply. Until 1994, the SAT Subject Tests were known as Achievement Tests; and from 1995 until January 2005, they were known as SAT IIs. Of all SAT subject tests, the Biology E/M test was the only SAT II that allowed the test taker a choice between the ecological or molecular tests. A set of 60 questions was taken by all test takers for Biology and a choice of 20 questions was allowed between either the E or M tests. This test was graded on a scale between 200 and 800. The average for Molecular is 630 while Ecological is 591.

On January 19 2021, the College Board discontinued all SAT Subject tests, including the SAT Subject Test in Biology E/M. This was effective immediately in the United States, and the tests were to be phased out by the following summer for international students. This was done as a response to changes in college admissions due to the impact of the COVID-19 pandemic on education.

== Format ==
This test had 80 multiple-choice questions that were to be answered in one hour. All questions had five answer choices. Students received one point for each correct answer, lost ¼ of a point for each incorrect answer, and received 0 points for questions left blank. The student's score was based entirely on his or her performance in answering the multiple-choice questions.

The questions covered a broad range of topics in general biology. There were more specific questions related respectively on ecological concepts (such as population studies and general Ecology) on the E test and molecular concepts such as DNA structure, translation, and biochemistry on the M test.

== Preparation ==
The College Board suggested a year-long course in biology at the college preparatory level, as well as a one-year course in algebra, and lab experience as preparation for the test. The test required understanding of biological data and concepts, science-related terms, and the ability to effectively synthesize and interpret data from charts, maps, and other visual media. However, most questions from this test were derived from, or are similar to, the pre-2012 AP Biology multiple choice questions. By taking an AP class or a class with similar rigor, one's chances at doing well on this test should have improved.

== See also ==
- SAT
- SAT Subject Tests
- PSAT/NMSQT
