= SAT Subject Test in Mathematics Level 1 =

Standardized test in the United States

The SAT Subject Test in Mathematics Level 1 (formerly known as Math I or MathIC (the "C" representing the use of a calculator)) was the name of a one-hour multiple choice test given on algebra, geometry, basic trigonometry, algebraic functions, elementary statistics and basic foundations of calculus by The College Board. A student chose whether to take the test depending upon college entrance requirements for the schools in which the student is planning to apply. Until 1994, the SAT Subject Tests were known as Achievement Tests; and from 1995 until January 2005, they were known as SAT IIs. Mathematics Level 1 was taken 109,048 times in 2006. The SAT Subject Test in Mathematics Level 2 covered more advanced content.

Generally you need to have completed a semester of a pre-calculus class with a solid “B” or better to feel comfortable on the Math 1, whereas the content of the Math 2 test extends through Algebra II and basic trigonometry, precalculus, and basic calculus.

— Compass Education Group FAQ

On January 19, 2021, the College Board discontinued all SAT Subject tests, including the SAT Subject Test in Mathematics Level 1. This was effective immediately in the United States, and the tests were to be phased out by the following summer for international students. This was done as a response to changes in college admissions due to the impact of the COVID-19 pandemic on education.

== Format ==
The test had 50 multiple choice questions that were to be answered in one hour. All questions had five answer choices. Students received 1 point for every correct answer, lost ¼ of a point for each incorrect answer, and received 0 points for questions left blank.

The questions covered a broad range of topics. Approximately 10-14% of questions focused on Numbers and Operations, 38-42% focused on Algebra and functions, 38-42% focused on Geometry (including Euclidean, coordinate, three-dimensional, and trigonometry), and 6-10% focused on Data analysis, Statistics, and probability.

== Calculator Use ==
The College Board stated that a calculator "may be useful or necessary" for about 40-50% of the questions on the test. The College Board also encouraged the use of a graphing calculator over a scientific calculator. It also said that this test was "developed with the expectation that most students are using graphing calculators."

Students were not permitted to use calculators on the Mathematics Level 1 test that have a QWERTY format keyboard, that require an electrical outlet, that make noise, use paper tape, that have non-traditional methods of input (such as a stylus), or those that are part of a communication device (such as PDA's, laptops, or cell phones). Calculators that had slanted screens or large displays (numbers 1 in. or more) are seated at the discretion of the test supervisor.

== Preparation ==
The College Board suggested as preparation for the test three years of mathematics, including two years of algebra, and one year of geometry.

== Scoring ==
For each of the 50 multiple choice questions, students received 1 point for every correct answer, lost ¼ of a point for each incorrect answer, and received 0 points for questions left blank. This created a raw score, which was then converted into a scaled score. The conversion between these numbers varied depending on the difficulty of a particular test administration. The scaled score was the only score reported to either students or colleges, and ranged from 200 to 800, with 800 being the best possible score. The standard deviation between test scores in 2006 was 102.

Less than one percent of the 2006 College-Bound Seniors taking the test received a perfect score of 800. None got a score lower than 260. The mean score was 593.

== See also ==
- SAT
- SAT Subject Tests
- PSAT/NMSQT
