= SAT Subject Test in Literature =

Standardized test in the United States

The SAT Subject Test in Literature was a one-hour multiple choice test given on English literature by The College Board. A student chose whether to take the test depending upon college entrance requirements for the schools in which the student is planning to apply. Until 1994, the SAT Subject Tests were known as Achievement Tests; and from 1995 until January 2005, they were known as SAT IIs. Of all SAT subject tests, Literature was taken the third most, with 119,180 administrations in 2008. On January 19 2021, the College Board discontinued all SAT Subject tests, including the SAT Subject Test in Literature. This was effective immediately in the United States, and the tests were to be phased out by the following summer for international students. This was done as a response to changes in college admissions due to the impact of the COVID-19 pandemic on education.

== Format ==
This test had an average of 60 multiple choice questions about six to eight passages to be answered in one hour. Of the passages, about half were prose and half were poems. Up to twenty percent could have been drama excerpts. 30% were passages written before 1700, 30% were written between 1701 and 1900, and 40% were written after 1900. Half of the passages were written by British authors and half by American authors, although the College Board stipulated that up to 20% may be written by authors from other English-speaking countries. While the author was usually not given, the date of first publication usually accompanied each passage.

== Preparation ==
The College Board gave a list of concepts covered in this exam:

- meaning and theme
- argument
- word connotation
- form, structure, and organization
- genre
- figurative language, specifically imagery
- narrative voice
- characterization

Furthermore, the College Board recommended familiarity with specialized analytical terms, including irony, stanza, imagery and tone. They also recommended regularly reading British and American literature, though no book list is given.

== Scoring ==
Theoretically, the lowest score on this exam was a 200, with the highest being 800. However, in 2008, the lowest score was a 260. The mean score was 580, with a standard deviation of 112. Less than 1% of those who took the exam received a perfect score (800). Students were permitted to take this exam more than once to try to improve their scores.

== See also ==
- SAT
- SAT Subject Tests
- PSAT/NMSQT
