= EMQ =

EMQ may refer to:

- Emergency Management Queensland, Australia; defunct
- Ethoxyquin, a preservative
- Extended matching questions
