= SAT Subject Test in United States History =

Standardized test in the United States

The SAT Subject Test in United States History was the name of a one-hour multiple choice test given on United States History by The College Board. A student chose whether to take the test depending upon college entrance requirements for the schools in which the student is planning to apply. Until 1994, the SAT Subject Tests were known as Achievement Tests; and from 1995 until January 2005, they were known as SAT IIs. Of all SAT subject tests, United States History was taken the second most, with 119,903 administrations in 2009. On January 19, 2021, the College Board discontinued all SAT Subject tests, including the SAT Subject Test in United States History. This was effective immediately in the United States, and the tests were to be phased out by the following summer for international students. This was done as a response to changes in college admissions due to the impact of the COVID-19 pandemic on education.

== Format ==
The test had 90 multiple choice questions that were to be answered in one hour. All questions had five answer choices. Students' scores were based entirely on their performance in answering the multiple choice questions.

The questions covered a broad range of topics. Approximately 31–35% of questions focused on political history, 13–17% focused on economic history, 20–24% focused on social history, 13–17% focused on intellectual and cultural history, and 13–17% focused on foreign policy.

The questions also varied with respect to time period; approximately 20% focused on the period of the Pre-Columbian era to 1789, 40% focused on the period between 1790 and 1898, and 40% focused on the period between 1899 and the present day.

== Scoring ==
For each of the multiple choice questions, students received 1 point for every correct answer, lost 1/4 of a point for each incorrect answer, and received 0 points for questions left blank. This created a raw score, which was then converted into a scaled score. The conversion between these numbers varied depending on the difficulty of a particular test administration. The scaled score was the only score reported to either students or colleges and ranges from 200 to 800, with 800 being the best possible score. The mean and standard deviation of the test scores in 2009 were 599 and 115, respectively.

== Preparation ==
The College Board suggested as preparation for the test a year-long course in United States History at the college preparatory level. The test required understanding of historical data and concepts, cause and effect relationships, geography, and the ability to effectively synthesize and interpret data from charts, maps, and other visual media. However, most questions from this test were derived from/similar to the AP US History Multiple Choice questions from 2014 and earlier (the 2015 exam has been revised). By taking an AP class, IB History of the Americas, or a class with similar rigor, the chances at doing well on this test were much improved.

== See also ==
- SAT
- SAT Subject Tests
- PSAT/NMSQT
