= Nancy Cole =

Nancy Cole may refer to:

- Nancy Cole (psychologist)
- Nancy Cole (mathematician)
