= Communications Arts High School =

Magnet school in Texas, United States

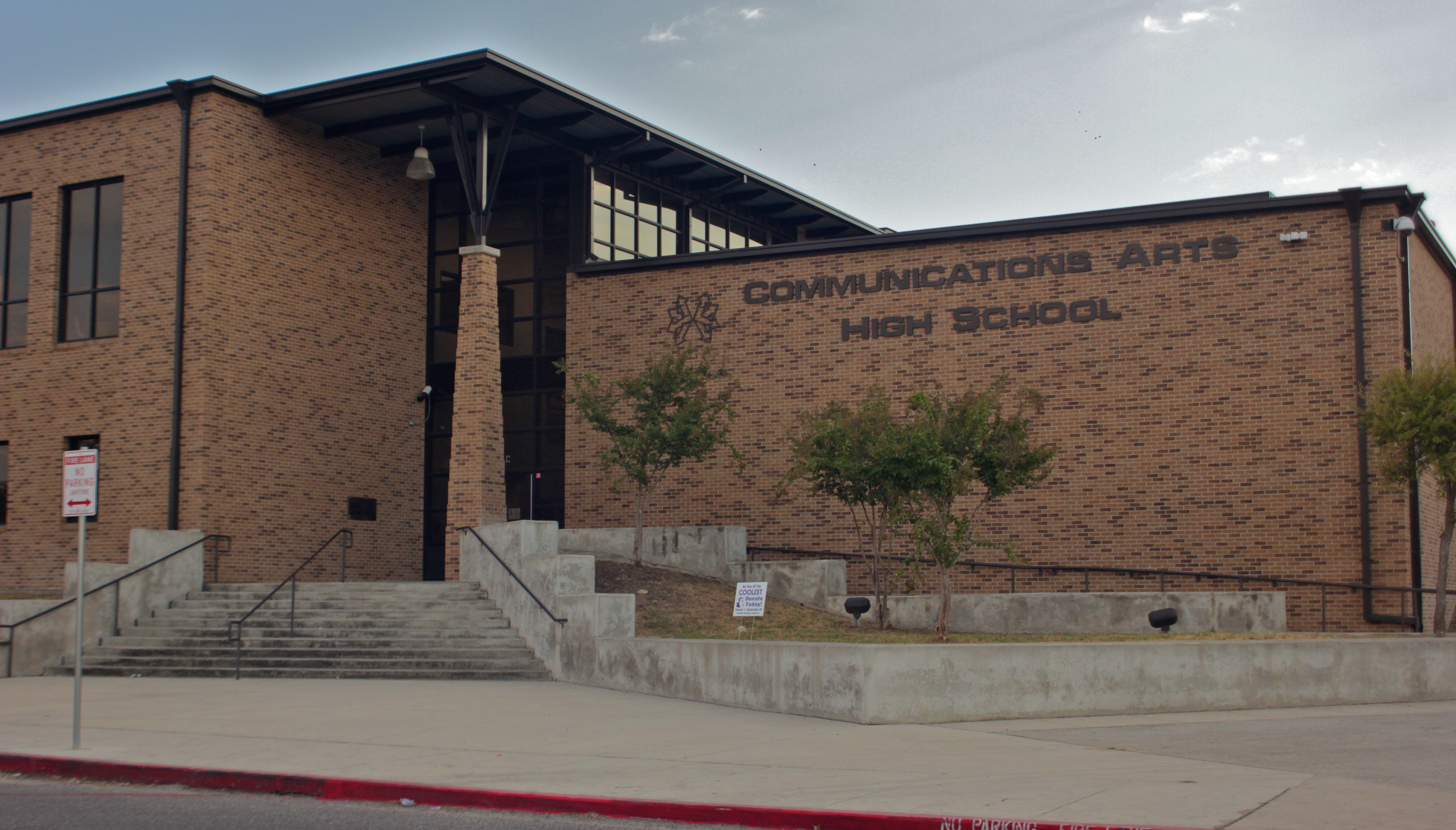

Location
- 11600 FM 471 W San Antonio, Bexar County, Texas 78253; 29.500237°N 98.720151°W

Information
- School type: Public, High School Magnet
- Founded: 1995
- School district: Northside Independent School District
- Superintendent: Brian Woods
- Principal: Lisa Baker
- Grades: 9–12
- Enrollment: 530 (2010)
- Color: Red White
- Mascot: The Arrows, The Raiders
- Yearbook: Unity
- Website: nisd.net/communicationsarts/

Communications Arts High School (commonly Comm Arts or CAHS) is a magnet school in the Northside Independent School District of San Antonio, Texas, United States. The school is consistently rated as one of the top high schools in the nation. Founded in 1995, it has an enrollment of 100–150 students per class, accepting 150 freshmen per year and 20 sophomores per year. The school is a "school within a school" sharing the campus of William Howard Taft High School with an academic focus on teaching multimedia and communications skills.

== Recognition ==
In 2008 and 2009, it was ranked 26th and 17th in Newsweek magazine's America's Top Public High Schools, respectively. In 2010, the school was ranked 19th in the nation by Newsweek. It has consistently placed the highest of any San Antonio high school on the list since its inception in 2006.

The school has been recognized by the Washington Post as one of the top 100 most challenging high schools in the nation (public or private) since 2011, most recently charting at number 57 in 2017.

In 2011, the school was rated "recognized" by the Texas Education Agency.

== Campus ==
Communications Arts resides within the larger Taft High School campus in the C building. The C building was designed by O'Neill, Conrad, Oppelt Architects and built by Eaton Contracting in 2003. Teachers may elect to hold special classroom activities in the school's outdoor classroom, but students not are allowed to have lunch there due to lack of supervision and weather conditions. Students taking Yearbook or Advanced Broadcast Journalism courses have access to a publications lab equipped with iMacs, and all strands have classrooms with iMacs as well.

== Admission ==
Admission to Communications Arts is open to Bexar County students with at least a C average, and in the past, required the submission of an application and the student's choice of an essay or a 5-minute video, though this was changed prior to the 2023-2024 school year. Eligible applicants are entered into a lottery system with selected students notified by email or through the magnet portal notifications. Prior to admitting the class of 2005, the admissions process did not operate as a lottery, and admitted students were selected based on the merits of their application. Each year, the school accepts approximately 130 freshmen. As a public school, no tuition is charged to either in-district or out of district students.

== Curriculum ==
Communications Arts' curriculum focuses especially on communications skills. All students are required to have at least three credits of Spanish or American Sign Language. Students are also required to take Advanced Broadcast Journalism, Audio/Video Production, or Animation courses, with the option of taking other advanced media classes separate from Taft. These courses include OnRamps Arts & Entertainment; Literary Genres: Film, Mythology and/or Science Fiction, all of which are semester/half-year courses; and Yearbook.

Additional emphasis is placed on college preparation. Freshmen and Junior students take the PSAT on campus once a year, and Sophomore students are highly encouraged to take the exam as well. All students take Advanced Placement and Advanced courses, with students being required to take AP Human Geography and Advanced English I their Freshman year and AP World History and Advanced English II their Sophomore year. Students also take AP US History, AP English III and IV as well as other Advanced/AP science and mathematics courses on the Taft campus in their junior and senior years. Students who follow the standard curriculum generally graduate with Distinguished Achievement Diplomas.

Students also participate in traditional electives, including fine arts and athletics, with Taft students.

In total, a Communications Arts student is required to graduate with at least 26 or 27 credits in specific subjects. The tables below provide information based on the strand chosen.

Advanced Broadcast Journalism Example Schedule
Freshman	Sophomore	Junior	Senior
Advanced English I	Advanced English II	AP English III	AP English IV
AP Human Geography	AP World History	AP US History	AP Government/AP Economics*
Algebra I	Algebra II	Geometry	(Senior Math)**
Biology	Chemistry	Physics	(Senior Science)**
Advanced Broadcast Journalism I	Advanced Broadcast Journalism II	Advanced Broadcast Journalism III	Independent Study Journalism
Spanish I OR American Sign Language I	Spanish II OR American Sign Language II	Spanish III OR American Sign Language III	Free Period OR Extra Course
Fine Arts Course**	PE Course**	Health* (Speech Credit earned with the Advanced Broadcast Journalism Strand)	Free Period OR Extra Course

Audio/Video Production Example Schedule
Freshman	Sophomore	Junior	Senior
Advanced English I	Advanced English II	AP English III	AP English IV
AP Human Geography	AP World History	AP US History	AP Government/AP Economics*
Algebra I	Algebra II	Geometry	(Senior Math)**
Biology	Chemistry	Physics	(Senior Science)**
Principles of Arts, Audio/ Visual Technology, and Communication	Digital Communications	Audio/Video Production I	Audio/Video Production II (Block Period)
Spanish I OR American Sign Language I	Spanish II OR American Sign Language II	Spanish III OR American Sign Language III	Audio/Video Production II (Block Period)
Fine Arts Course**	PE Course**	Health/Speech*	Free Period OR Extra Course

Animation Example Schedule
Freshman	Sophomore	Junior	Senior
Advanced English I	Advanced English II	AP English III	AP English IV
AP Human Geography	AP World History	AP US History	AP Government/AP Economics*
Algebra I	Algebra II	Geometry	(Senior Math)**
Biology	Chemistry	Physics	(Senior Science)**
Principles of Arts, Audio/ Visual Technology, and Communication	Digital Media	Animation I	Animation 2 (Block Period)
Spanish I OR American Sign Language I	Spanish II OR American Sign Language II	Spanish III OR American Sign Language III	Animation 2 (Block Period)
Fine Arts Course**	PE Course**	Health/Speech*	Free Period OR Extra Course

*Courses listed are semester/half-year courses

**Courses have multiple options to earn the credit

== Student activities ==
=== Organizations ===
Communications Arts student organizations generally operate independently of their Taft counterparts and include a National Honor Society chapter, Student Council, Environment Club, Photography Club, Creative Writing Club, Spanish National Honor Society, an E-Sports club, Film Club, Coding Club, and Helping Hands. All organizations have faculty sponsors, which assist in any fundraising activities like selling food during school events, or after school. Each class has its own organization as well, responsible for raising funds to prepare for senior year activities. The senior class each year is responsible for hosting Senior Banquet, but some classes may opt for a Senior trip in leu of a banquet.

=== Events ===
The school's small atmosphere and numerous student organizations have fostered many annual events. These include musical events such as Grassroots, a musical event in which students can perform solo or group acts. Additionally, the school hosts two festival style events, Turkeyfest and Earth Day, sponsored by the Student Council and Environment Club, respectively. These events are generally fundraisers for the organizations that sponsor them.

Commstock is an annual flea market type event produced by the school; Commstock allows students to sell handmade items in the comm parking lot. Students pay to rent a table and parking spot and typically sell handmade crafts. Commstock typically takes place on a Friday evening in November or December.

Grassroots is an annual concert held in comm's LGI. It typically takes place late in the second semester. During Grassroots students perform musical or theatrical acts. Students buy tickets to the event beforehand and the tickets contribute to a chosen fundraiser.

=== Publications ===
The school's focus on communications pursuits fosters many student produced publications. These include weekly video announcements and an annual recruitment video, produced by the Advanced Video Technology class. The school produces its own yearbook as well, under the title Unity. Students also publish a Spanish language campus e-paper under the title La Communidad.

== Incidents ==
=== Bats ===
In early 2019, Mexican free-tailed bats infested the building. All classes were held in Taft until they were removed by animal control. One expert was bitten during the operation. Students during that time suggested changing their mascot to the "Comm Bats".
