= Nancy Cole (mathematician) =

American mathematician (1902–1991)

Nancy Cole (October 15, 1902 – July 7, 1991) was an American mathematician who made important and pioneering contributions to Morse theory.

== Early life and education ==
Cole was the daughter of a Boston grocer and the descendant of Mayflower immigrants. As a high school student in Plymouth, Massachusetts, her interest in mathematics was sparked by teacher Lucia Richardson. She studied at Jackson College for Women, the women's sister school of Tufts University, from 1920 to 1922, mentored there by mathematician Edith Bush, before transferring to Vassar College, where she earned a bachelor's degree in 1924. She returned to study at Radcliffe College in 1926, earned a master's degree at Radcliffe in 1929, and completed her Ph.D. in 1934. Her dissertation, The Index Form Associated with an Extremaloid, was supervised by Marston Morse, and she was acknowledged by Morse for her assistance in preparing his 1934 book The Calculus of Variations, which began the study of Morse theory.

== Career and later life ==
Between finishing at Vassar and beginning graduate study at Radcliffe, Cole taught college preparatory courses in Hartford, Connecticut, and while at Radcliffe she worked as an instructor at Vassar in 1927–1928 and at Wells College in 1931–1932 before taking a faculty position at Sweet Briar College in 1933, taking a position previously held by Ethel Moody and working at Sweet Briar with Eugenie Maria Morenus.

During World War II, she moved from Sweet Briar to Kenyon College, where from 1943 to 1944 she taught mathematics for the Army. After working from 1944 to 1947 at the Connecticut College for Women, she became an assistant professor of mathematics at Syracuse University in 1947. She was promoted to associate professor in 1952, and retired as associate professor emeritus in 1971.

She died of a heart attack on July 7, 1991, in Plymouth, Massachusetts.

== Recognition ==
Cole was named a Fellow of the American Association for the Advancement of Science in 1950.
