= Kodali =

Kodali (Telugu: కొడాలి) is a Telugu surname. Notable people with the surname include:

- Geetika Kodali (born 2004), American cricketer
- Kodali Nani (born 1971), Indian politician
- Rambabu Kodali, Indian academic administrator
- Riya Kodali, Indian-American fashion designer and blogger
