= Jackson College for Women =

Coordinate college associated with Tufts University in Massachusetts

The Jackson College for Women, also sometimes known as Jackson College of Tufts University, was established in 1910 as a coordinate college associated with Tufts College, and later Tufts University, and located in Medford and Somerville, Massachusetts. The Jackson College and the Tufts College of Liberal Arts shared the same courses and faculty but, for much of its existence, Jackson College had its own student activities and student government, separate from that of Tufts, and its own dean. It was a prestigious women's college at its peak; in comparison to the Tufts undergraduate schools that men attended, Jackson College was considered harder to get admitted to and to have an academically stronger group of students. Students of this era were very proud of being associated with Jackson and felt identity with, and loyalty to, the Jackson name.

Over time, things changed, and female students felt more of a belonging to Tufts University itself. Jackson College was subsumed into the Tufts University School of Arts and Sciences in stages in 1980, 1999–2000, and 2002.

== Coeducation and origins ==
Tufts College was founded in 1852 by the Universalist Church of America, and while most other such endeavors of the Universalists were coeducational in nature, Tufts admitted male students only. Coeducation in the United States had begun with Oberlin College in 1833 and found the most traction in state universities. Despite the widely publicized views of the likes of Edward Hammond Clarke – who argued that the education of women would come at the expense of their mental and reproductive health – there was considerable pressure on Tufts College to change this policy. This was in the context of similar pushes for collegiate education for women happening in the Boston area, and New England in general, in the years after the Civil War. There were also nearby examples such as Cornell University, which was coeducational from its founding in 1865 and admitted female students soon thereafter. Beginning around 1870, there would be a pronounced increase over the next few decades in the percentage of college students who were women. In 1883, a committee was formed at Tufts to study the question of admitting women; they concluded that doing so would be too expensive. There were also fears among male students that the presence of women in the school would cause social regulations to become more rigid.

The campaign to admit women did not stop and finally, on July 15, 1892, the Tufts Board of Trustees voted "that the College be opened to women in the undergraduate departments on the same terms and conditions as men." Tufts thus became coeducational. In terms of academics, women students did very well. But after a while there was substantial pressure in the reverse direction, as it was felt among administrators that Tufts was failing to attract male students given a perception that the college was becoming more female in nature. (Nearby Boston University faced a similar issue.) In less than two decades, nearly half the students in liberal arts at Tufts were women, and in some years, the matriculating class was well more than half women. As president of Tufts, Frederick W. Hamilton, due to his strong opposition to coeducation, advocated a separate college for women, with a separate faculty and administration.

Jackson College for Women was created by the trustees on April 12, 1910, with Tufts thusly abandoning full coeducation. The new school was named after Cornelia Maria Jackson (1822–1895) a teacher and wife of a businessman, who had bequeathed a sum of money and half her estate to Tufts in furtherance of women's education – as she put it, to help "remove the disabilities of women". The legislature of the Commonwealth of Massachusetts granted charter approval for the creation of Jackson College in that same year, with the motion facing little commentary, and no opposition, within either the Massachusetts House of Representatives or the Massachusetts Senate. An account at the time in the Journal of Education said that under the arrangement, the women of Tufts "are not to be deprived of their privileges ... but granted them under conditions that will be more acceptable to all concerned."

Other coordinate colleges began in similar circumstances: as a means to either avoid, or reverse, full coeducation. The most prominent coordinate instantiations were Radcliffe College for Harvard College, Barnard College for Columbia College, Columbia University, and Pembroke College in Brown University. Others included the Sophie Newcomb College for Tulane University, the Flora Stone Mather College for Women for Western Reserve University, and a Women's College at the University of Rochester. For a while there was also a special Women's Laboratory at the Massachusetts Institute of Technology. As these instances suggest, coordinate colleges were most frequently seen in the eastern United States. Colleges in the western United States, in contrast, tended to adopt co-education. In addition to the coordinate colleges, Massachusetts in particular had a number of stand-alone women's colleges, including three of the "Seven Sisters" – Mount Holyoke College, Smith College, and Wellesley College – as well as Emmanuel College, Pine Manor College, Simmons College, and Wheaton College.

== Early history ==
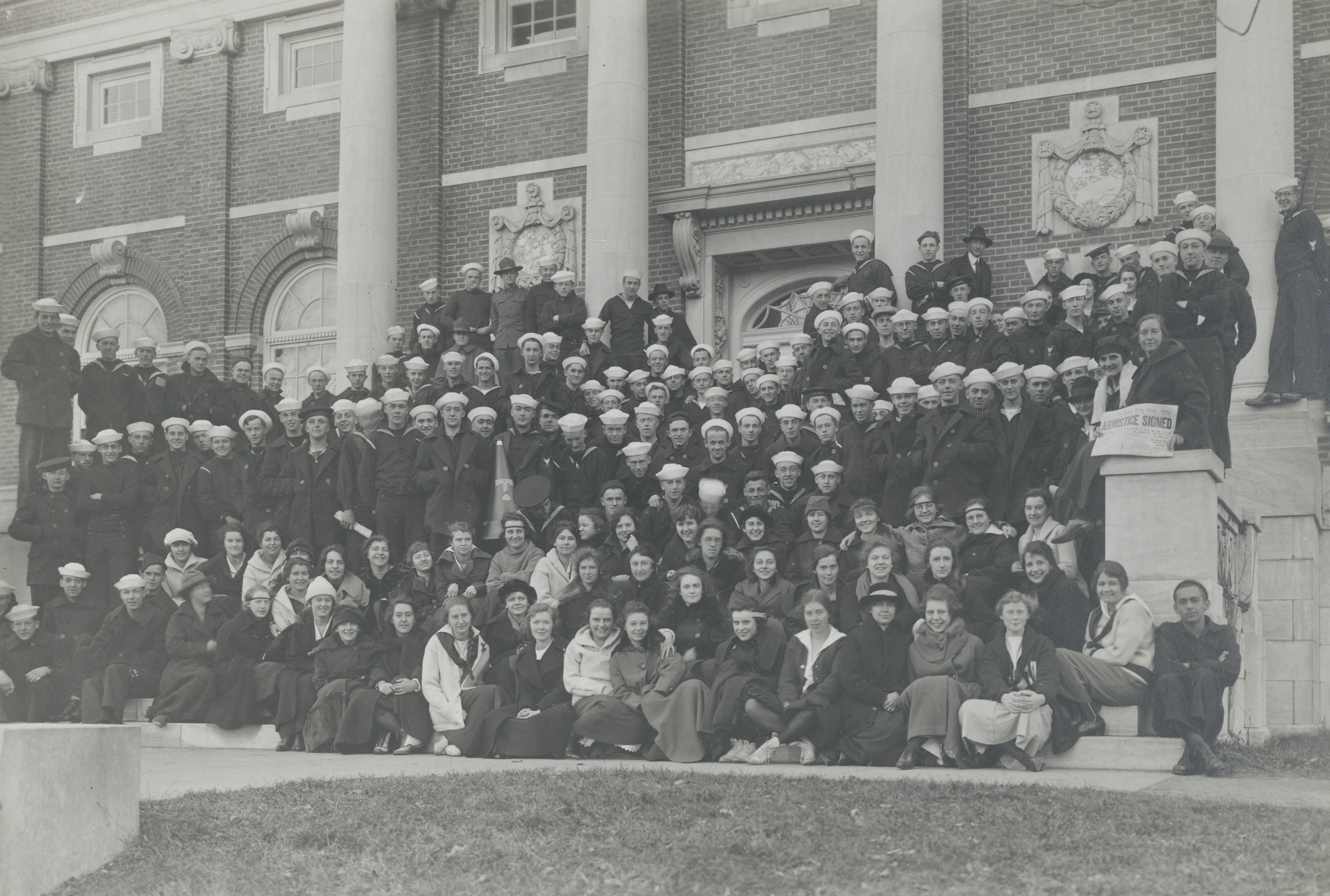
Following the Armistice that ended World War I in 1918, the women of Jackson College celebrated with the men of the Naval Unit on campus

Initially there was an attempt to have full segregation of the Jackson women from the Tufts men, with separate classes for them, albeit taught by the same professors. There were also separate study spaces and chapel services, and there was a goal to have completely separate buildings for them as well.

But Tufts as a whole was always under financial stress. (Indeed, Tufts would long have a limited endowment and support from alumni, leading to it relying heavily on tuition payments.) The complete segregation goal soon proved to be infeasible due to these financial constraints and the unnecessary overlapping that it required, a redundancy that the faculty in particular did not appreciate. The push for it lessened after Hamilton left the Tufts presidency in 1912, and dissipated almost completely within the next couple of years. Full segregation of classes was thus abandoned.

By December 1912, the largest schools at Tufts were the medical and dental schools, but outside of those, enrollments were in the Engineering School, 211; the School of Liberal Arts, 155; Jackson College for Women, 93; and Crane Theological School, 7.

Caroline S. Davies was the first dean of Jackson College. In addition, she taught Greek there and was known as an advocate for women's suffrage in the United States. And Jackson students themselves formed a chapter of the College Equal Suffrage League.

Davies held the deanship until 1925. She was succeeded by Edith Bush, a mathematician who was the first female professor in Tufts' College of Engineering (and was the older sister of the engineer, inventor, and science administrator Vannevar Bush), who held the position until 1952.

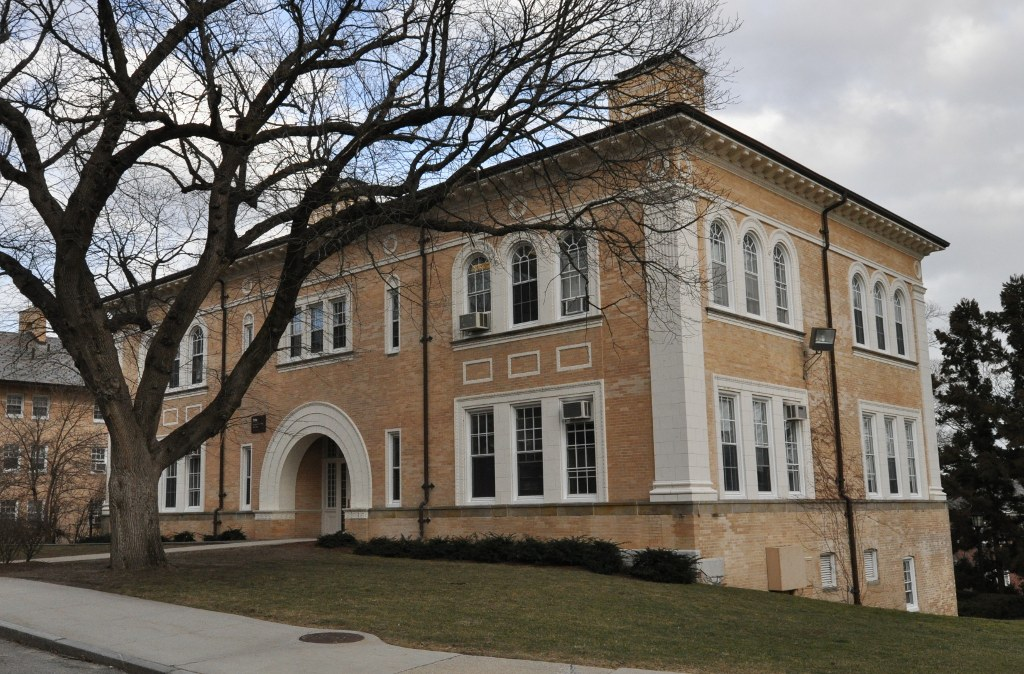
Miner Hall, one of the locations of Jackson College in its initial years (here seen in 2013)

Metcalf Hall, which had opened in 1893 as a women's dormitory, continued to serve in that role after Jackson College was founded. Between 1910 and 1915, both Miner and Paige halls became home to Jackson College, until women were integrated into the rest of Tufts in 1915 and the facilities were returned to the Crane Theological School. The two halls were on top of the Hill that dominates the overall Tufts campus.

In terms of what diplomas read for graduates of Jackson College for Women, for the first three years, from 1911 through 1913, they were given a choice between getting degrees from Tufts College or from Jackson; most chose Tufts. Then for the next three years, from 1914 to 1916, the graduates received degrees from Jackson. However, in 1917, this switched to graduates receiving degrees from Tufts, and remained this way for several decades.

In 1925, Jackson College had a limit of 250 female students, and prospective students were officially required to take the Tufts entrance examinations.

Tufts president John Albert Cousens had a goal of elevating Tufts' core schools, including Jackson College, into highly selective, residential institutions, but the financial pressures of the Great Depression meant that Jackson College struggled to maintain its existing enrollment levels and there were no monies available for new dormitory construction.

== Mid-century history ==
A project to build a new gymnasium for Jackson College was announced in 1945. Completed in 1947 and named Jackson Gymnasium in honor of a conductor on the New York, New Haven and Hartford Railroad unrelated to Cornelia Maria Jackson, it served multiple purposes over the next number of decades.

During both World War I and World War II, Jackson students engaged efforts to show support for American troops overseas and in fund-raising activities such as for war bonds. Economic pressures meant that Jackson women were first allowed to take engineering courses during the first World War, although none graduated with an engineering degree until the second.

Jackson College grew during the 1950s, beginning from a base of around 500 students. Some of the growth was intended to counteract a decline in male enrollments following the immediate post-World War II boom in college education. Hodgdon Hall was built in 1954 as a dormitory for Jackson College; it also contained a dining area that could seat a hundred students. In 1959, a pair of adjacent buildings were opened for Jackson College: Bush Hall, a dormitory, and Dewick Dining Hall. This was part of Tufts' longstanding desire to gain a more selective, residential, non-local student body.

Jackson College for Women perhaps reached its greatest prominence by the mid-1960s. Applications to Jackson College more than doubled between 1959 and 1967, and Jackson College accounted for much of the university's increased enrollments. In 1962, women students petitioned the university to have "Jackson College" added to their diplomas due to the sense of pride they had in belonging to it, and the change was made beginning in 1963. Towards the end of the decade, Jackson College had an enrollment around 1,100 women.

In 1968, construction began on a new dormitory for Jackson students. The project soon became embroiled in protests and demonstrations regarding low number of minorities employed by the various contractors doing the work. Subsequently named Lewis Hall, when the building was opened it became a coeducational dormitory, the first on campus.

== Academics and student life ==
=== Courses and faculty ===
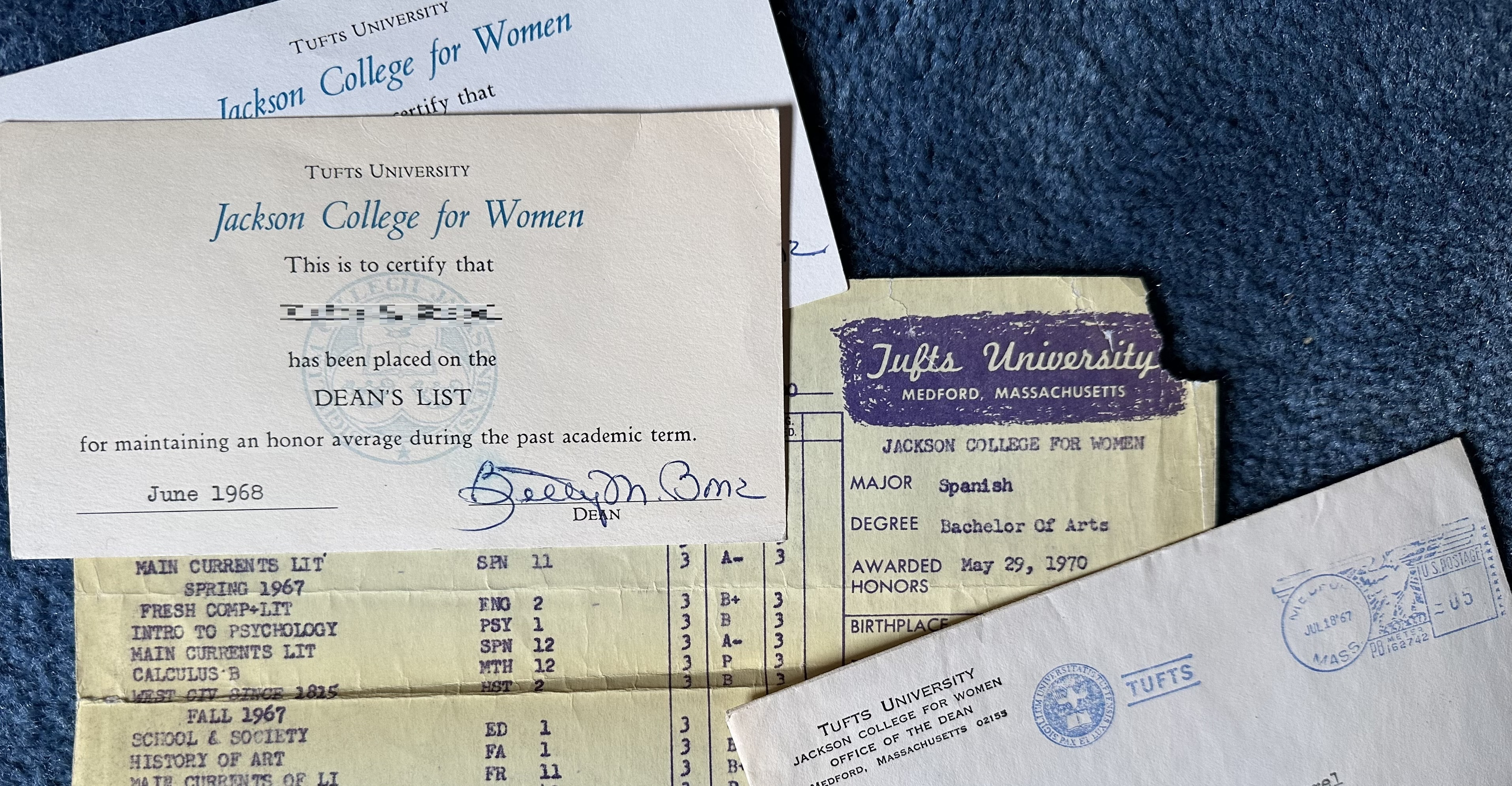
'Jackson College for Women' was prominently displayed on documents of its era

Unlike other schools associated with Tufts, Jackson College always shared the same faculty as the School of Liberal Arts. They also shared the same curriculum and facilities.

In the 1950s, the most popular majors at Jackson were English, biology, history, sociology, and government (referring to political science). By 1968, the distribution of majors was social studies 41 percent, humanities 32 percent, sciences 20 percent, and the arts 7 percent.

Preparation for education was a popular choice and the curriculum featured practice teaching as a choice.

In Tufts histories and class notes, Jackson College students have an initial 'J' before their graduation year, such as 'J49', as compared to 'A' for Liberal Arts, 'E' for Engineering, and so forth. Students of the college were sometimes referred to as Jaxonites.

=== Admissions and demographics ===
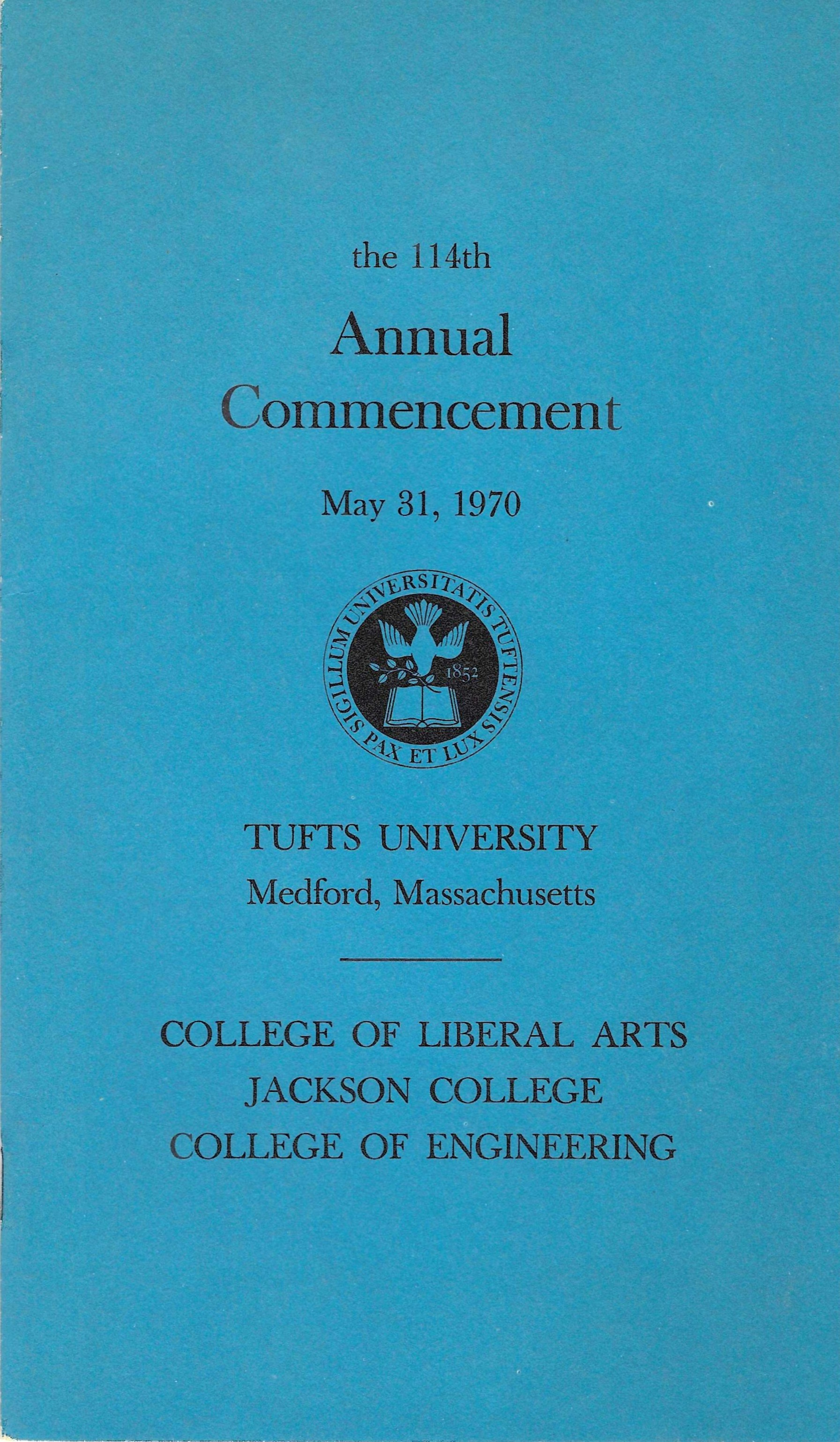
The university commencement program for 1970, which broke out Jackson College separately from the College of Liberal Arts and the College of Engineering

In terms of admission practices, until the early 1970s, Jackson College had a separate admissions office from the rest of Tufts. And in admission terms, Jackson College was considered distinct from Tufts University, such that they had completely separate entries from each other in the 1969 edition of The College Handbook, a thick publication put out by the College Entrance Examination Board.

Jackson College for Women had a reputation for being selective. In 1969, for instance, applicants were required to take the Achievement Test in English Composition, along with two other Achievement Tests of the applicant's choosing. This requirement was something typically only required by more selective colleges, especially the competitive admission schools in the Eastern United States, such as those in the Ivy League.

As a general rule, Jackson College was harder to get into than the Tufts men's Liberal Arts and Engineering schools, and in part because of that, Jackson College women were considered stronger academically than their Tufts male peers. Especially in earlier years, as the Tufts Daily later stated, "being accepted to Jackson meant more to women than acceptance at Tufts did to men." Historically, most incoming Jackson students had graduated in the top quintile of their high school classes. This percentage was as high as 86 percent in 1961, while in 1968 it was 77 percent for students coming from public schools but much less for the minority of students coming from private schools, where the level of student ability tended to be higher to begin with. The large majority of incoming students in 1968 had Scholastic Aptitude Test verbal and math scores in the 600s or 700s. The acceptance rate for Jackson College in 1968 was 25 percent, and was about the same for those coming from public or private schools.

Geographically, Jackson College long took a plurality of its students from the New England region; in fact, by the late 1930s, some 30 percent of the women at Tufts were from the Commonwealth of Massachusetts itself. The Mid-Atlantic region was second in sending students to Jackson, with other areas well behind.

According to long-time Tufts professor and provost Sol Gittleman, for many years typically only four Jewish students were admitted to Jackson each year – with pairs of them being assigned to each other as roommates – a practice that would continue into the 1950s. Tufts historian Russell E. Miller notes, however, that there are no paper records at the university to indicate that any kind of religion-based quota system was ever in effect. In any case, beginning during the 1950s and the university presidency of Nils Yngve Wessell, not only more Jewish students but also more Roman Catholic students were admitted to Jackson and to the university as a whole. In particular, the number of Jewish students at Jackson would rise considerably. By the 1980s, the overall Tufts population was roughly one-third Catholic, one-third Jewish, and one-third Protestant and others.

Jackson, like the rest of Tufts, long had few African American students, a situation that the university as a whole sought to improve beginning in the 1960s.

=== Campus life and social change ===
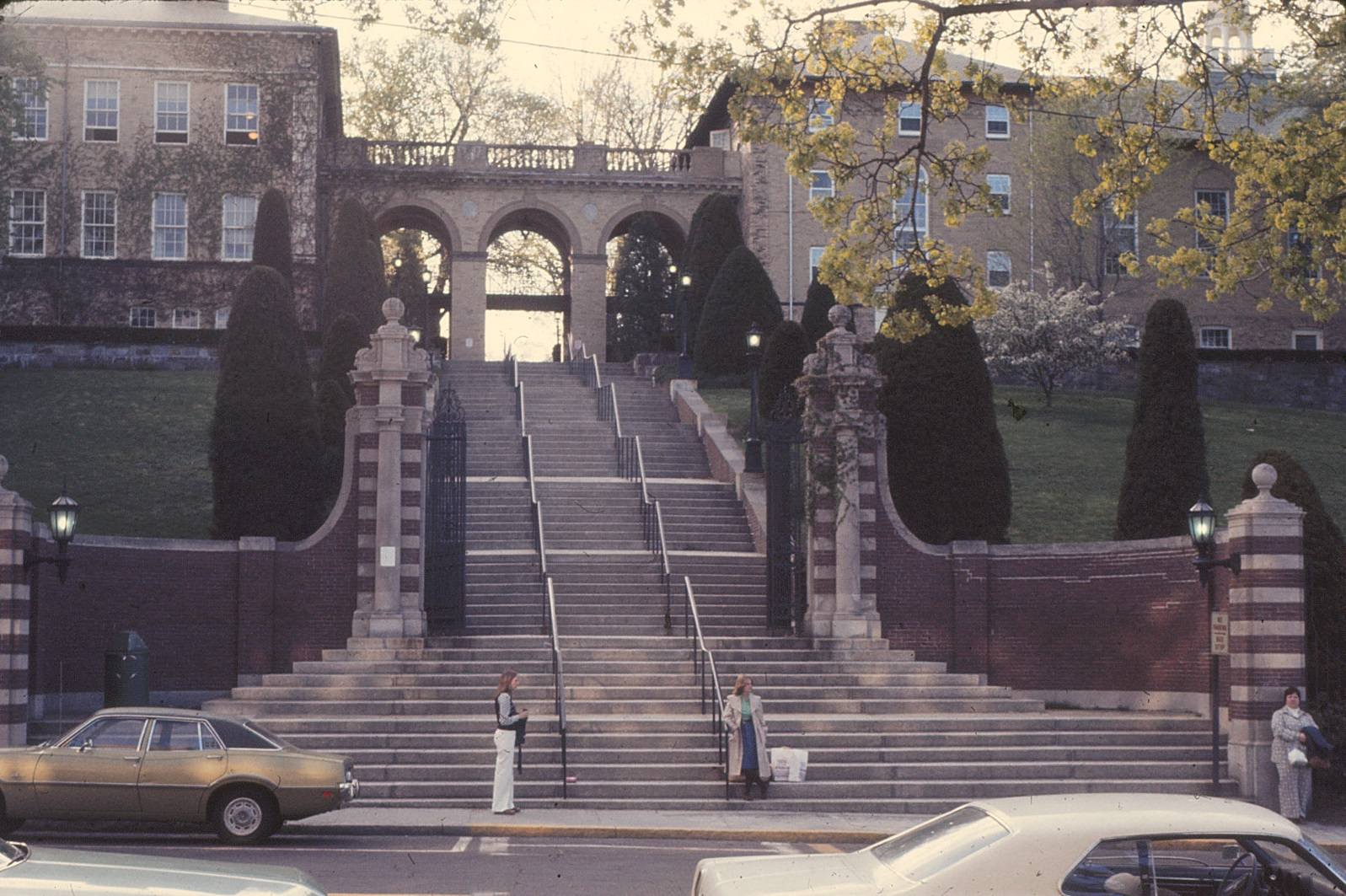
The Tufts Memorial Steps, seen here in 1976, were part of the distinction between the more formal uphill and less formal downhill parts of the campus for Jackson College students. The buildings on either side of the steps are Miner and Paige halls, the original quarters for the college.

The 1930s saw Jackson students facing strict rules in their dormitories, including curfews, specified visiting hours, and the need for chaperones for trips off campus.

In this era, first-year students at Jackson College had to obey various informal, hazing-inspired rules, such as always wearing a freshman pin (later replaced by a bow), obeying orders given by sophomores and upperclassmen, and learning school songs. Violations of these rules would lead to paddling during a "Baby Day". The culmination of the year was one of Jackson's more unusual traditions, the "Baby Party". Sometimes done in connection with a sorority, this was an annual event wherein the first-year women would have to dress up as babies and be quizzed by sophomores. The last Baby Party was held in 1954. Hazing overall began to be criticized during the late 1950s and fell out of practice over the next decade.

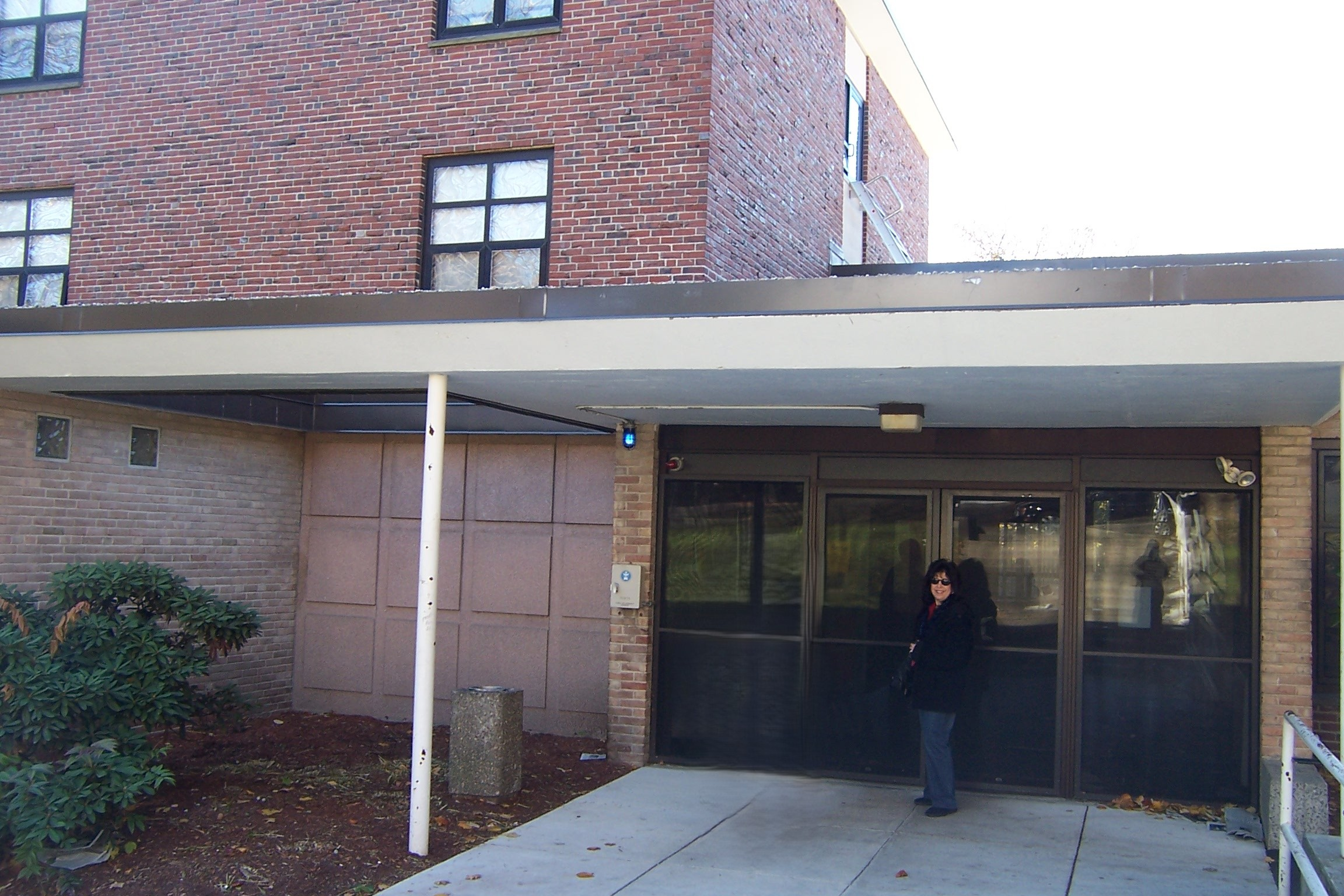
Hodgon Hall was a dormitory for Jackson College students; here in 2007 it is visited by one of its mid-late 1960s alumnae

Into the 1960s, the women in Jackson dormitories lived through a series of in loco parentis rules: there was a curfew time, there was a sign-out sheet, dorms were single-sex, and if women were in men's dormitories, the doors had to be kept open. Dormitories had a telephone on each floor, and students would take turns staffing it to find the recipient of a call and take a message if they were not around.

Dress codes were not just stated but enforced under the deanship of Myra L. Herrick. These codes stipulated that dresses or skirt-and-sweater combinations had to be worn in classrooms and public areas such as dining halls, whilst slacks or jeans were for dormitories. Another framing of this was that when women students were on the Hill, they had to wear skirts; they could only wear pants in the area outside of Professors Row.

This would change, and students who entered Jackson College in the middle of the 1960s but graduated at the end of the decade saw large-scale shifts, with many of the in loco parentis rules being relaxed or dropped. In part this was due to Dean Herrick overreaching, such as banning vending machines in dormitories from stocking Coca-Cola on grounds of dental health, and in part it was due to the societal pressures of the times. Dean Antonia Handler Chayes, who took office in 1968, presided over a wholesale change in the rules regarding women at Jackson, giving them much more autonomy.

Indeed, the attitudes of Jackson College students regarding the subjects of education, work, marriage, and motherhood underwent rapid change during the late 1960s and early 1970s. This included women students dressing much more informally, and less expensively, than previous generations had. These evolving attitudes were studied by the professor of psychology Zella Luria, who was awarded the Jackson College Teaching Award by Tufts University in 1969.

=== Student organizations and activities ===
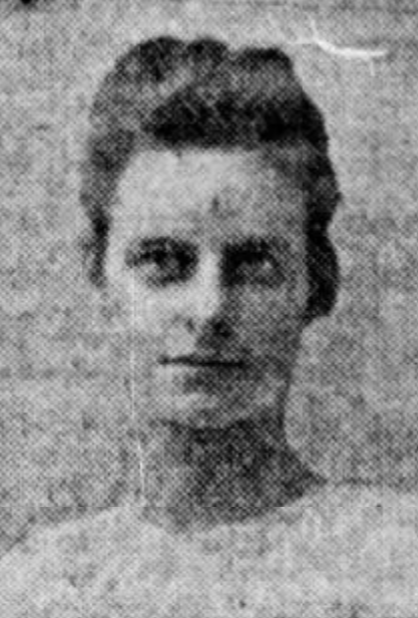
Eleanor Bisbee, theology student and prominent figure at Jackson College

Jackson College had its own student government, as well as its own clubs and other organizations. The college had a Phi Beta Kappa program.

Student groups at Jackson included an a cappella singing group, the Jackson Jills, founded in the early 1960s and Tufts' oldest female group. The group has appeared at campus events in the decades since.

The Tufts undergraduate yearbook, called the Jumbo, began the 1960s with separate sections for Tufts College and Jackson College seniors. However, by 1968, the seniors were merged.

A Women's Center opened in 1972, initially located in the basement in Miller Hall.

Jackson women also participated in many of Tuft's overall traditions, such as placing coins in Jumbo's trunk for luck. Jackson College was more central to campus life than some other women-dominated professional schools under the Tufts University umbrella, such as the Boston School of Occupational Therapy.

Under the acting deanship of Betty M. Bone circa 1967, there were attempts to increase the visibility of Jackson College. Accomplished Jackson alumnae from various occupations held career seminars at the college. Jackson College fielded a team that competed on the College Bowl television show. And an honor called the Jackson College Award of Distinction was created in 1968, meant to represent women that the students would most care to follow the example of in some way. Jackson students voted on the choice. The first award went to the playwright Lillian Hellman; the other nominees included the economist Barbara Ward, the novelist Barbara Tuchman, and the writer and politician Claire Booth Luce. The second award was given in 1970, and the recipient was the civil rights figure Coretta Scott King. It is unclear if there was ever a third award given out.

=== Athletics ===
In 1914 there was a Jackson college tennis team. There was also some competitions in what would be termed track and field and gymnastics.

Around 1940, when the idea of collegiate women competing in sports against each other was frowned upon by athletic and university administrators, Jackson College did field a golf team. One of the participants defended the activity by saying that it allowed them to engage in "intercollegiate competition ... with a few other colleges within a small radius. I believe that it can be controlled so that the evils which have been claimed for it are nil. We have found it to be stimulating, helpful, and fun."

By the late 1960s, Jackson College offered a variety of sports, both intramural and extramural, as well as groups for modern dance and synchronized swimming.

=== Sororities ===
The Lambda chapter of the Alpha Xi Delta sorority was active at Tufts and Jackson College during the 1907–1957 period. It disassociated with its national body in 1956, in protest of "discriminatory policies", following the Sigma Kappa sorority having been suspended by its national body earlier the same year for having allowed as a prospective member an African American student. Also active at Jackson College was the Alpha Omicron Pi sorority. The Chi Omega sorority existed from 1910, the same year as Jackson's founding.

The college also had a Christian Guild.

== Later history and coeducation ==
By the end of the 1970s, there was already less of a sense of Jackson College as a separate entity – it was more common for female students to just think of themselves as attending Tufts.

In 1980 the school was integrated with the College of Liberal Arts but was still recognized in the formal name of the undergraduate arts and sciences division, the College of Liberal Arts and Jackson College. The position as the head of it became the Dean of Liberal Arts and Jackson College. In some senses, this represented the full merger of Jackson College into the rest of the university,

By the mid-1980s, it was becoming increasingly clear that the two colleges were united. The Association of Tufts Alumnae – which had been created for women graduates of Tufts in 1905, before the creation of Jackson – had changed its name in the 1950s to the Jackson College Association of Tufts Alumnae. Then in 1986 it changed its name back to the original formulation, so as to represent other women in Tufts such as those in the College of Engineering or the Boston School of Occupational Therapy. A new publication created in 1993, Issues: Arts, Sciences and Technology at Tufts, mentioned the College of Liberal Arts and Jackson College in a brief introduction of its scope but otherwise had essentially no other references to Jackson.

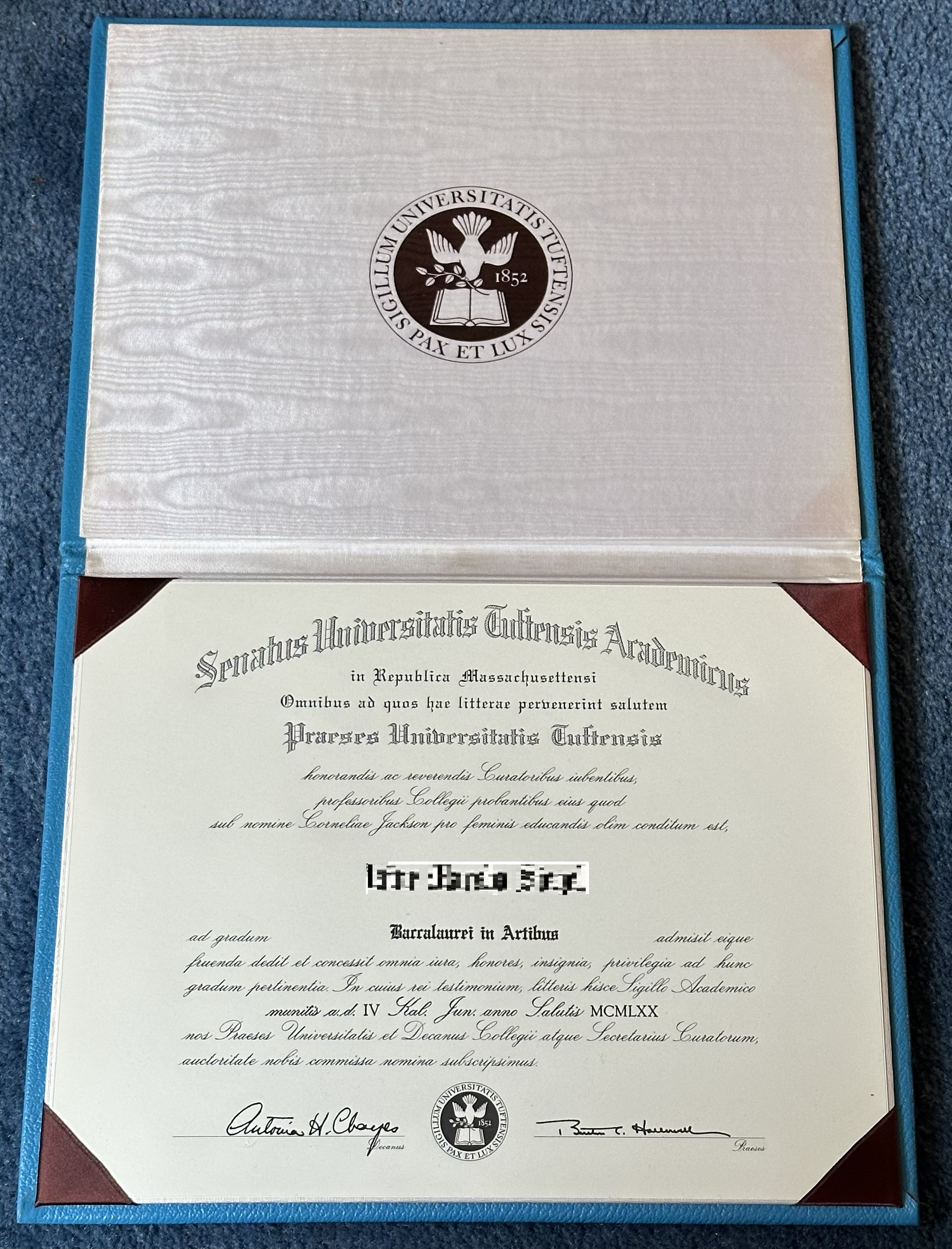
In 1970, the diploma's mention of Jackson was only in Latin: "honorandis ac reverendis Curtatoribus inbentibus, professoribus Collegü probantibus eius quod sub nomine Corneliae Jackson pro feminis educandis olim conditum est, ..." which can be translated "To the honored and revered Trustees who initiated it, and to the professors of the College who approved that which was once established under the name of Cornelia Jackson for the education of women, ..."

In 1999, as part of a large university-wide reorganization, the trustees redesignated the Faculty of Arts and Sciences as the Faculty of Arts, Sciences, & Engineering and formally created a School of Arts and Sciences (encompassing the College of Liberal Arts and Jackson College and the Graduate School of Arts and Sciences). Similarly, the College of Engineering was renamed the School of Engineering, a change that per one account took place in 2000. But even after this, female undergraduates received their degrees from Jackson College for Women while male undergraduates received their degrees from the College of Liberal Arts. This was reflected on their diplomas, albeit completely in Latin.

In 2002, a change was made such that women graduates no longer had Jackson College on their diplomas. The change had been requested by a number of female students, many of whom were unaware of what Jackson College was or why their diplomas showed it. The feeling was that the diplomas of male and female students should look alike. In addition, it was felt that the Tufts name carried more weight in the professional world, as the Jackson name was not as familiar to people as that of the best-known coordinate colleges such as Radcliffe.

However, Jackson College still existed as a legal, fiduciary entity, with a charter to the Commonwealth of Massachusetts; Tufts provost Sol Gittleman said, "It's too big a deal to go to the Commonwealth and change everything."

== Legacy ==
As one alumnus of the Jackson College class of 1966 said at the time of the diploma change in 2002, she and her classmates "were very proud of their identity in Jackson College. What the diploma says is totally up to the people now ... obviously, attitudes have changed."

In 2023, Virginia Drachman, a history professor at Tufts, assessed the legacy of the creation of Jackson College as an alternative at the time to full cooeducation: "I would argue that on the one hand, it was backtracking. And on the other hand, it really benefited women. When women create their own institutions, and they usually create them because they've been excluded from others historically, it grows out of discrimination. But it provides an opportunity for women to come together to create leadership positions to run things the way they want to run them."

== Deans of Jackson College ==
During its years as a separate entity, the school was led by a dean. These were the deans of Jackson College for Women:

- Caroline S. Davies, 1910 – 1925
- Edith Linwood Bush, 1925 – 1952
- Katherine R. Jeffers, 1952 – 1959
- Myra L. Herrick, 1959 – 1966
- Betty M. Bone (acting), 1966 – 1968
- Antonia Handler Chayes, 1968 – 1970
- Adele Smith Simmons, 1970 – 1972
- Nancy S. Milburn, 1972 – 1982

In 1980, the merger of Jackson College with the College of Liberal Arts led to the position being called the Dean of Liberal Arts and Jackson.

== Bibliography ==
- Austin, Brad (2015). Democratic Sports: Men's and Women's College Athletics during the Great Depression. Fayetteville: University of Arkansas Press. doi:10.1353/book39214. ISBN 978-1-61075-563-4.
- R. L. B. (July 7, 1910). "In the Massachusetts Legislature". Journal of Education. 72 (1): 21–22. doi:10.1177/002205741007200128. JSTOR 42875731.
- Chayes, Antonia H.; Kaufman, Christopher L.; Wheeler, Raymond L. (November 1970). "The University's Role in Promoting Minority Group Employment in the Construction Industry". University of Pennsylvania Law Review. 119 (1): 91–161. doi:10.2307/3311400. JSTOR 3311400.
- The College Handbook. New York: College Entrance Examination Board. 1969.
- Freeland, Richard M. (1992). Academia's Golden Age: Universities in Massachusetts, 1945–1970. New York: Oxford University Press.
- Gittleman, Sol (2004). An Entrepreneurial University: The Transformation of Tufts, 1976–2002. Lebanon, New Hampshire: University Press of New England. ISBN 978-1-58465-416-2.
- "Educational Intelligence: College Notes". The Journal of Education. 71 (16 (1776)): 443–447. April 21, 1910. JSTOR 42814494.
- King, Patricia M. (1981). "The Campaign for Higher Education for Women in 19th-Century Boston". Proceedings of the Massachusetts Historical Society. 93: 59–79. JSTOR 25080888.
- Marino, Kelly L. (Winter 2025). "'We Have the Opportunity to Help Shape a Democracy': Maud Wood Park and the League of Women Voter's Post-Suffrage Campus Campaigns". Historical Journal of Massachusetts. 53 (1): 21–56.
- Miller, Russell E. (1966). Light on the Hill: A History of Tufts College 1852–1952. Vol. 1. Boston: Beacon Press.
- Miller, Russell E. (1986). Light on the Hill: A History of Tufts University since 1952. Vol. 2. Cambridge, Massachusetts: MassMarket Books.
- Sauer, Anne; Branco, Jessica; Bennett, John; Crowley, Zachary, eds. (2000). "TEI | Concise Encyclopedia of Tufts History | ID: F1881x54h | Tufts Digital Library". Concise Encyclopedia of Tufts History. Tufts University. hdl:10427/14829.
- Sauer, Anne (2001). Tufts University. The College History Series. Charleston, South Carolina: Arcadia Publishing. ISBN 978-0-7385-0853-5.
- Slocum, W. F. (1914). "Coeducation and Coördinate Education". In McLaughlin, Andrew Cunningham; Hart, Albert Bushnell (eds.). Cyclopedia of American Government. Vol. 1. New York: D. Appleton and Company. pp. 305–307.
- Solomon, Barbara Miller (1985). In the Company of Educated Women: A History of Women and Higher Education in America. New Haven, Connecticut: Yale University Press. ISBN 0-300-03639-6.
