= SAT Subject Test in Physics =

Standardized test in the United States

The SAT Subject Test in Physics, Physics SAT II, or simply the Physics SAT, was a one-hour multiple choice test on physics administered by the College Board in the United States. A high school student generally chose to take the test to fulfill college entrance requirements for the schools at which the student was planning to apply. Until 1994, the SAT Subject Tests were known as Achievement Tests; until January 2005, they were known as SAT IIs; they are still well known by this name.

The material tested on the Physics SAT was supposed to be equivalent to that taught in a junior- or senior-level high school physics class. It required critical thinking and test-taking strategies, at which high school freshmen or sophomores may have been inexperienced. The Physics SAT tested more than what normal state requirements were; therefore, many students prepared for the Physics SAT using a preparatory book or by taking an AP course in physics.

On January 19 2021, the College Board discontinued all SAT Subject tests, including the SAT Subject Test in Physics. This was effective immediately in the United States, and the tests were to be phased out by the following summer for international students. This was done as a response to changes in college admissions due to the impact of the COVID-19 pandemic on education.

== Format ==
The SAT Subject Test in Physics had 75 questions and consisted of two parts: Part A and Part B.

Part A:

- First 12 or 13 questions
- 4 groups of two to four questions each
- The questions within any one group all relate to a single situation.
- Five possible answer choices are given before the question.
- An answer choice can be used once, more than once, or not at all in each group.

Part B:

- Last 62 or 63 questions
- Each question has five possible answer choice with one correct answer.
- Some questions may be in groups of two or three.

== Topics ==
Major Topic	% on Test
Mechanics	36–42
Electricity and Magnetism	18–24
Waves	15–19
Heat, Kinetic Theory and Thermodynamics	6–11
Modern Physics	6–11
Miscellaneous	4–9

== Scoring ==
The test had 75 multiple choice questions that were to be answered in one hour. All questions had five answer choices. Students received 1 point for every correct answer, lost ¼ of a point for each incorrect answer, and received 0 points for questions left blank. This score was then converted to a scaled score of 200–800. The mean score for the 2006–07 test administrations was 643 with a standard deviation of 107. Sample percentile ranks for the 2008 administrations are available from the College Board.

== Preparation ==
The College Board's recommended preparation was a one-year college preparatory course in physics, a one-year course in algebra and trigonometry, and experience in the laboratory.

== Resources ==
Students taking the SAT Subject Test in Physics were prohibited from using any resources during the test, including textbooks, notes, or formula sheets. Although there were mathematics questions including trigonometry, the use of a calculator was not allowed. All scratch work was required to have been done directly in the test booklet.

== See also ==
- SAT
- SAT Subject Tests
- PSAT/NMSQT
