= SAT Subject Test in Spanish =

Standardized test

The SAT Subject Test in Spanish (formerly known as the SAT II) was a standardized test given by the College Board that assessed fluency in Spanish among high school students. It was typically taken after three to four years of studying the language, once the student had reached a significant level of understanding and competence in it. The test also partially emphasized preparation for AP Spanish and/or Spanish as a course in College. Passage selections were drawn from prose fiction, historical works, and newspaper and magazine articles, as well as advertisements, flyers and letters.

On January 19 2021, the College Board discontinued all SAT Subject tests, including the SAT Subject Test in Spanish. This was effective immediately in the United States, and the tests were to be phased out by the following summer for international students. This was done as a response to changes in college admissions due to the impact of the COVID-19 pandemic on education.

The SAT Subject Test is a standardized exam designed to assess students' aptitude and comprehension in three key areas. These areas include vocabulary and structure, paragraph comprehension, and reading comprehension. The exam is one hour in duration and comprises 85 multiple-choice questions, which are distributed evenly among the three topic areas. The test is graded on a scale of 200 to 800 and is administered five times per year.

The exam does not include a listening section. Students seeking to assess their listening skills must take the SAT Subject Test in Spanish with Listening, which is administered once annually.

To achieve success on the SAT Subject Test, students must demonstrate a variety of skills. For instance, they must possess knowledge of words that denote various parts of speech, along with basic expressions that are contextually appropriate. Furthermore, they must be able to identify grammatically correct words and expressions to complete a sentence. A portion of the exam contains vocabulary and structure questions integrated into more extended paragraphs, necessitating a strong comprehension of the context. Finally, students must exhibit an understanding of the main and supporting ideas, themes, style, tone, and spatial and temporal settings of a passage. Demonstration of these skills is crucial to achieving a high score and demonstrating a solid grasp of the exam material.

== Scoring ==
This test was no different from any other SAT Subject Test in language, so all "standard scoring methods" applied, including:

- Each correct answer is worth 1 point
- Each answer left blank neither adds nor deducts points to the score
- Each incorrect answer subtracts 0.25 points away from the final grade

It was possible to get a perfect score on the exam while leaving some answers blank, depending on how well one did on each section.

The mean score on this test was a 653. 18,161 students took the test in 2016.
