= Zella Luria =

American psychologist

- Born: Zella Hurwitz; February 18, 1924; New York City, U.S.
- Died: June 10, 2018 (aged 94); Cambridge, Massachusetts, U.S.
- Education: Brooklyn College
- Spouse: Salvador Luria (m. 1945)
- Children: 1
- Scientific career
- Fields: Psychology
- Workplaces: Tufts University

Zella Luria (née Hurwitz; February 18, 1924 – June 10, 2018) was an American psychologist and feminist known for her work on the development of gender identity and sexuality across the life course. Her work helped to shift the field towards a cognitive approach that emphasized the social construction of gender and the active role of children in such construction.

Luria taught at Tufts University from 1959 to 2002. She co-authored the textbook Psychology of Human Sexuality (1979), later reissued as Human Sexuality (2nd ed. 1987) and was an associate editor of the journal Archives of Sexual Behavior. Luria was a Fellow of the American Psychological Association and the American Psychological Society.

== Family life and education ==
Zella Hurwitz was born on February 18, 1924, in New York City, to Hyman and Dora (Garbarsky) Hurwitz. Her parents were Jewish immigrants from Belarus. Her mother was a factory seamstress who did not read English, and her father was a house painter and a member in a union. Zella entered university at age 16 and received her bachelor's degree in psychology from Brooklyn College in 1944.

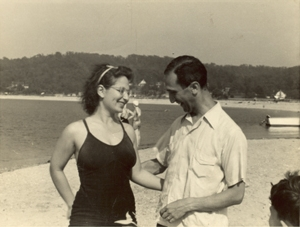
Zella and Salvatore Luria at Cold Spring Harbor.

Hurwitz then attended Indiana University Bloomington as a graduate student in psychology. There she met microbiologist Salvador Luria, a faculty member. They married in 1945, and Zella spent 1945–1946 on leave with her husband at Cold Spring Harbor. In 1951, she received her PhD in experimental psychology with a minor in genetics from Indiana University Bloomington.

== Career ==
Zella Luria became a postdoctoral fellow and worked as an assistant professor at the University of Illinois Urbana-Champaign, where she studied with Hobart Mowrer, Charles E. Osgood, and J. McVicker Hunt. As a clinician, she helped to carry out a blind analysis of the multiple personality case on which the film The Three Faces of Eve was later based. Osgood and Luria were the first to use the semantic differential (SD) measurement technique in clinical personality research, comparing the semantic structures used by Eves' three personalities.

Because rules at the University of Illinois prevented more than one family member from holding professorships, Zella was unable to become a professor there. Salva Luria accepted a position at Massachusetts Institute of Technology in 1958, and Zella Luria joined Tufts University as an assistant professor of psychology. During her career, she also held visiting professorships at the University of Florida at Gainesville, the University of Michigan, and University of California, Los Angeles.

In the course of her 40 year career at Tufts, Luria studied the formation of gender identities and sexuality in children, using methods from anthropology to document how parents treated and spoke about their children, how gender and sexuality were presented in media, and how children interacted with other children. She reported differences in how parents viewed their children, based on their identified gender, as early as the first twenty-four hours after birth. In other studies she examined patterns of development in children, observing that groups of boys and girls showed different patterns of interaction, which changed over time, with oppositional gender strategies of "girls against the boys" appearing in young children. She also reported that girls were focusing on and critiquing themselves and others in terms of appearance, prettiness and ugliness as early as the fourth or fifth grade.

Her work included interviews with people who did not conform to gender and sexual norms, including tomboys, transgender individuals, and sex workers. Guest speakers in her classes included victims of domestic violence and members of the Association of Boston Prostitutes. Luria studied the changing attitudes of Jackson College of Tufts University students in the late 1960s and early 1970s on education, work, marriage, and motherhood. Luria published over 40 refereed journal articles and co-authored the textbook Psychology of Human Sexuality (1979), later reissued as Human Sexuality (2nd ed. 1987). She was an associate editor of the journal Archives of Sexual Behavior

Luria was an active feminist and critic of social inequity, She worked to improve gender balance on the Tufts faculty, and advocated for equal pay and provisions for maternity leave and day care. She worked to support lesbian, gay, bisexual, and transgender rights and to oppose sexual harassment and violence. She was a founding member of the Women's Studies program and a supporter of the Women's Center on campus. She opposed the Vietnam War and voted to ban the ROTC from the Tuft's campus in 1969. She worked with Planned Parenthood and advocated for sex education in schools. She also worked with Physicians for Human Rights and the Center for Constitutional Rights, clinically assessing asylum seekers.

Luria was a member of the American Psychological Association for more than 60 years and an elected Fellow in the APA's Division 35, the Society for the Psychology of Women. She was a charter Fellow of the American Psychological Society (now the Association for Psychological Science), which was founded in 1988. She was the chapter president for the American Association of University Professors, and served as president of the New England Psychological Association in 1971–1972. Luria was awarded the Jackson College Teaching Award by Tufts University in 1969, and the Seymour Simches Award on Teaching and Advising in 1995.

== Selected publications ==
=== Books ===
- Luria, Zella H.; Rose, Mitchel D. (1979). Psychology of human sexuality. New York: Wiley. ISBN 978-0471556350.
- Luria, Zella; Friedman, Susan; Rose, Mitchel D. (1987). Human sexuality. New York: Wiley. ISBN 9780471886532.

=== Papers ===
- Osgood, Charles E.; Luria, Zella (October 1954). "A blind analysis of a case of multiple personality using the semantic differential". The Journal of Abnormal and Social Psychology. 49 (4, Pt.1): 579–591. doi:10.1037/h0054362. ISSN 0096-851X. PMID 13201293.
- Luria, S. E.; Luria, Zella (1970). "The Role of the University: Ivory Tower, Service Station, or Frontier Post? – Digital Collections – National Library of Medicine". Daedalus. Winter: 78. Archived from the original on December 4, 2020.
- Rubin, J.; Provenzano, F.; Luria, Z. (1974). "The eye of the beholder: Parents' views on sex of newborns". American Journal of Orthopsychiatry. 44 (4): 512–19. doi:10.1111/j.1939-0025.1974.tb00905.x. PMID 4844024.
- Luria, Zella; Meade, Robert G. (1984). "Sexuality and the Middle-Aged Woman". Women in Midlife. Springer US. pp. 371–397. doi:10.1007/978-1-4684-7823-5_18. ISBN 978-1-4684-7823-5.
- Thorne, B.; Luria, Z. (1986). "Sexuality and gender in children's daily worlds" (PDF). Social Problems. 33 (3): 176–90. doi:10.2307/800703. JSTOR 800703.
- Luria, Zella; Herzog, Eleanor W. (June 1991). "Sorting Gender out in a Children's Museum". Gender & Society. 5 (2): 224–232. doi:10.1177/089124391005002006. ISSN 0891-2432. S2CID 144219992.
- Luria, Zella; Jacklin, Carol Nagy (July 1, 1993). "Sexuality and Gender". Child and Adolescent Psychiatric Clinics of North America. 2 (3): 543–558. doi:10.1016/S1056-4993(18)30557-1. ISSN 1056-4993.
