= Edith Bush =

American mathematician (1882–1977)

Edith Linwood Bush (September 15, 1882 – November 3, 1977) was an American mathematician. She was the high school mathematics teacher of her younger brother, Vannevar Bush, before becoming dean of the Jackson College for Women at Tufts University and the first woman to teach engineering at Tufts.

== Life ==
Bush was born in Everett, Massachusetts on September 15, 1882, one of three children of Universalist minister R. Perry Bush and his wife, née Emma Linwood Paine. She grew up in Chelsea, Massachusetts, and graduated from Tufts University in 1903 as a member of Chi Omega and Phi Beta Kappa. She was the head mathematics teacher at Chelsea High School from 1906 to 1918, and was the mathematics teacher of her younger brother, Vannevar Bush. She briefly became principal of Provincetown High School before returning to Tufts in 1920, where she became a mathematics instructor.

In 1922, she became an assistant professor at Tufts, the first female faculty member to teach in the School of Engineering. She was named dean of the Jackson College for Women in 1925, and in the same year became a full professor. She held the deanship for more than two decades; as a history of Tufts has written, her time as dean saw "a period of unparalleled stability that saw no significant changes in the makeup or activities of the Jackson student body, its administration, or its relations with the rest of the institution." She retired in 1952, and was succeeded as dean by biologist Katherine Jeffers.

On her retirement she returned to Provincetown, Massachusetts, where she lived in a house built by her grandfather, Captain Lysander N. Paine. She died in Waltham, Massachusetts on November 3, 1977.

== Recognition ==
Tufts University awarded Bush an honorary doctorate in 1942. In 1959, a new student residence at Tufts was named Bush Hall in her honor. It was originally an undergraduate women's dormitory, but by 1991 was occupied only by graduate students. After major renovation in 1995, it again became an undergraduate dormitory.
