= SAT Subject Test in Chemistry =

Standardized test in the United States

The SAT Subject Test in Chemistry was a one-hour multiple choice test given on chemistry by The College Board. A student chose whether to take the test depending upon college entrance requirements for the schools in which the student was planning to apply. Until 1994, the SAT Subject Tests were known as Achievement Tests; until January 2005, they were known as SAT 2s; they are still well known by the latter name. On January 19 2021, the College Board discontinued all SAT Subject tests, including the SAT Subject Test in Chemistry. This was effective immediately in the United States, and the tests were to be phased out by the following summer for international students. This was done as a response to changes in college admissions due to the impact of the COVID-19 pandemic on education.

== Format ==
This test consisted of 85 questions. The first 23 questions numbered 1-23 were 'classification questions'. The next 15 questions, numbered 101-115, were called 'relationship analysis questions'. The SAT Subject Test in Chemistry was currently the only SAT that incorporates the relationship analysis questions. Relationship Analysis Questions required the student to identify the truth value of two statements. If both statements were true, the student would then have to analyze the relationship between the two statements to see if the second statement correctly explained the first statement. The last 47 questions numbered 24-70 were standard multiple choice questions. The metric system of measurement was used, rather than United States customary units. This was widely because students across the world would take SAT Subject Tests, not just Americans. Additionally, many chemists and scientists use the Metric System, considering the entire world uses it as well.

== Scoring ==
The test had 85 multiple choice questions, each consisting of five answer choices, that were to be answered in one hour. Students received 1 point for every correct answer, lost ¼ of a point for each incorrect answer, and received 0 points for questions left blank. This score was then converted to a scaled score of 200-800. The mean score for the 2009 test administrations was 638, standard deviation 113. In 2011, the mean score was 648 with a standard deviation of 110.

== Preparation ==
The College Board's recommended preparation was a one-year college preparatory course in chemistry, a one-year course in algebra, and experience in the laboratory. However, some second-year algebra concepts (including logarithms) were tested on this subject test. Given the timed nature of the test, one of the keys of the mathematics that appeared on the SAT II in Chemistry was not the difficulty, but rather the speed at which it had to have been completed. Furthermore, the oft-quoted prerequisite of lab-experience was sometimes unnecessary for the SAT Subject Test in Chemistry due to the nature of the questions concerning experiments; most laboratory concepts could simply be memorized beforehand. Some lab-based questions used diagrams, and thus it was helpful to know what common glassware looks like and how the different pieces are used.

== Difficulty ==
Like most of the SAT Subject Tests, the Chemistry SAT Test was relatively difficult. It tested a very wide breadth of content and expected students to formulate answers in a very short period of time. Many high school students found themselves picking up extra resource material, like prep books and online aids, to help them prepare for the SAT Chemistry test.

While the test was challenging, there were distinctions between the SAT Chemistry Test and the AP Chemistry exam, which is a more critical-thinking exam that is used not for college admissions but rather for college placement. Still, an AP course in Chemistry is sufficient preparation for the Chemistry SAT.

== Resources ==
The student was not allowed to use notes, textbooks, or a calculator on this test. The only resource a student could use was a periodic table which was provided with the test booklet. This table only provided atomic masses, atomic numbers, and symbols for each element.

== See also ==
- SAT
- SAT Subject Tests
- PSAT/NMSQT
