= SAT Subject Test in Mathematics Level 2 =

Standardized test in the United States

In the U.S., the SAT Subject Test in Mathematics Level 2 (formerly known as Math II or Math IIC, the "C" representing the sanctioned use of a calculator), was a one-hour multiple choice test. The questions covered a broad range of topics. Approximately 10-14% of questions focused on numbers and operations, 48-52% focused on algebra and functions, 28-32% focused on geometry (coordinate, three-dimensional, and trigonometric geometry were covered; plane geometry was not directly tested), and 8-12% focused on data analysis, statistics and probability. Compared to Mathematics 1, Mathematics 2 was more advanced. Whereas the Mathematics 1 test covered Algebra II and basic trigonometry, a pre-calculus class was good preparation for Mathematics 2. On January 19, 2021, the College Board discontinued all SAT Subject tests, including the SAT Subject Test in Mathematics Level 2. This was effective immediately in the United States, and the tests were to be phased out by the following summer for international students. This was done as a response to changes in college admissions due to the impact of the COVID-19 pandemic on education.

== Format ==
The test had 50 multiple choice questions that were to be answered in one hour. All questions had five answer choices. Students received 1 point for every correct answer, lost ¼ of a point for each incorrect answer, and received 0 points for questions left blank.

== Calculator use ==
The College Board stated that a calculator "may be useful or necessary" for about 55-60% of the questions on the test. The College Board also encouraged the use of a graphing calculator over a scientific calculator, saying that the test was "developed with the expectation that most students are using graphing calculators."

For the Mathematics Level Two test, students were not permitted to use calculators that have a QWERTY format keyboard, require an electrical outlet, make noise, use paper tape, have non-traditional methods of input (such as a stylus), or are part of a communication device (such as PDAs, laptops, or cell phones).

== Preparation ==
The College Board suggested as preparation for the test four years of mathematics, including two years of algebra, one year of geometry, and one year of either precalculus or trigonometry.

== Scoring ==
For each of the 50 multiple choice questions, students received 1 point for every correct answer, lost ¼ of a point for each incorrect answer, and received 0 points for questions left blank. This created a raw score, which was then converted into a scaled score. The conversion between these numbers varied depending on the difficulty of a particular test administration. The scaled score was the only score reported to either students or colleges, and ranged from 200 to 800, with 800 being the best possible score. The standard deviation of the test scores in 2006 was 105.

15 percent of the 2012 college-bound seniors taking the test received a perfect score of 800.

== See also ==
- SAT
- SAT Subject Tests
- PSAT/NMSQT
