= Extended matching items =

Extended matching items/questions (EMI or EMQ) are a written examination format similar to multiple choice questions but with one key difference, that they test knowledge in a far more applied, in-depth, sense.

It is often used in medical education and other healthcare subject areas to test diagnostic reasoning.

== Structure ==
EMQ example

EMQ example

The structure has three key elements:

Answer option list
Sources suggest using a minimum of eight answer options to a ratio of five scenarios or vignettes to ensure that the probability of getting the correct answer by chance remains reasonably low. The exact number of answer options should be dictated by the logical number of realistic options. This ensures that the test item has authenticity and validity.
Lead in question
This should be as specific as possible and on reading the lead in question it should be understand exactly what the student needs to do – without needing to look at the answer options. If you need to look at the answers to understand the question, the item has not been well written.
Two or more scenarios or vignettes
There should be at least two vignettes, otherwise this becomes an MCQ. Because the item allows for an in depth test of knowledge each of the scenarios should be related to one another by a theme that summarises the question overall. Each scenario should be roughly similar in structure and content, and each has one 'best' answer from amongst the series of answer options given.

== Research evidence ==
Case and Swanson 1989

Students sitting this test item format have a greater chance of answering incorrectly if they cannot synthesise and apply their knowledge as shown through the work of Susan Case and David Swanson (1989).

Evidence suggests that this format works best when there is a single best answer to each successive scenario or vignette.

== Other variants ==
There are some instances where EMIs do not follow the evidence based format. These other uses of the term have been criticised as they do not apply the key principles of the EMQ as stated above. E.g. a question where two lists are offered, one of terms and one of descriptions is often referred to as an EMI.

Example of an EMI variant

- This organelle stores the genetic information of a eukaryotic cell.
- This organelle synthesises polypeptides using information provided by mRNA.
- This organelle, found in plants, contains chlorophyll.

List of options

1. Chloroplast
2. Mitochondrion
3. Lysosome
4. Nucleus
5. Endoplasmic reticulum
6. Peroxisome
7. Golgi apparatus
8. Ribosome

Answer Key

1. 4
2. 8
3. 1
