= Rambabu Kodali =

Indian mechanical engineer

- Born: Andhra Pradesh, India

Rambabu Kodali is the Vice-Chancellor at Vellore Institute of Technology since Oct 2020. Previously he had served as director of Madanapalli Institute of Technology and Science (Oct 2019 to Sept 2020). He is former Pro-Vice Chancellor of Kalinga Institute of Industrial Technology Odisha, India (Aug. 2017 to Sept 2019) and former Director of the National Institute of Technology Jamshedpur, India. He took this responsibility on 3 August 2012. Prior to this role, he was Shri S.K Birla Chair Professor of Mechanical Engineering and was Head of the Department of Mechanical Engineering and Engineering Technology at the Birla Institute of Technology & Science Pilani.

== Education ==
Professor Rambabu Kodali earned his B.E., MTech in Mechanical Engineering from MANIT Bhopal, and his PhD from the Indian Institute of Technology, Kharagpur in the year 1991.
