= SAT Subject Tests =

Multiple-choice standardized tests

- Cover of booklet describing, and giving sample questions for, each of the tests offered
- Type: Paper-based standardized exam
- Administrator: College Board
- Purpose: Admission to undergraduate programs of universities and colleges
- Year started: c. 1950
- Year terminated: 2021
- Duration: One hour
- Score range: 200 to 800
- Regions: United States
- Languages: English

SAT Subject Tests were a set of multiple-choice standardized tests given by the College Board on individual topics, typically taken to improve a student's credentials for college admissions in the United States. For most of their existence, from their introduction in 1937 until 1994, the SAT Subject Tests were known as Achievement Tests, and until January 2005, they were known as SAT II: Subject Tests. They are still often remembered by these names. Unlike the SAT that the College Board offers, which are intended to measure general aptitude for academic studies, the Achievement Tests were intended to measure the level of knowledge and understanding in a variety of specific subjects. Like the SAT, the scores for an Achievement Test ranged from 200 (lowest) to 800 (highest).

Many colleges used the SAT Subject Tests for admission, course placement, and to advise students about course selection. Achievement tests were generally only required by the most selective of colleges. Some of those colleges named one or more specific Achievement Tests that they required for admission, while others allowed applicants to choose which tests to take. Students typically chose which tests to take depending upon college entrance requirements for the schools to which they planned to apply.

Fewer students took achievement tests compared to the SAT. In 1976, for instance, there were 300,000 taking one or more achievement tests, while 1.4 million took the SAT. Rates of taking the tests varied by geography; in 1974, for instance, a half of students taking the SAT in New England also took one or more achievement tests, while nationwide only a quarter did. The number of achievement tests offered varied over time. Subjects were dropped or added based on educational changes and demand. In the early 1990s, for instance, Asian languages were added so as not to disadvantage Asian-American students, especially on the West Coast.

On January 19, 2021, the College Board discontinued Subject Tests. This was effective immediately in the United States, and the tests were to be phased out by the following summer for international students.

== Tests in 2020 ==
There were 20 different tests in 2020, the last year in which subject tests were offered, 12 of them in foreign languages. Examinees were required to bring an acceptable calculator to take the Mathematics tests (calculators were not permitted on any other test) and a CD player to take the language with listening tests.

Test	Subject	Mean score (2016)	Standard deviation (2016)	Number of students (2016)	Notes
SAT Subject Test in Literature	Literature	599	122	57,761	
SAT Subject Test in United States History	U.S. History	624	115	66,967	Formerly American History and Social Studies
SAT Subject Test in World History	World History	615	109	15,542	Formerly European History and World Cultures
SAT Subject Test in Mathematics Level 1	Mathematics	599	116	66,058	Formerly Math I or IC. Basic algebra and geometry such as monomials, polynomials, and the Pythagorean theorem were assessed in the beginning of the exam before progressing into basic trigonometry, algebraic functions, elementary statistics and a few miscellaneous topics.
SAT Subject Test in Mathematics Level 2	Mathematics	690	101	145,140	Formerly Math II or IIC. Consisted of algebra, geometry, trigonometry, functions, statistics and a few miscellaneous topics. 20% of all test takers reportedly attained the highest score, 800.
SAT Subject Test in Biology E/M	Biology	616 (E) 647 (M)	114 (E) 110 (M)	72,196 in total, 31,965 (E); 40,231 (M)	Students had a choice of taking either an ecological ("E") or molecular ("M") biology oriented test.
SAT Subject Test in Chemistry	Chemistry	668	104	71,173	
SAT Subject Test in Physics	Physics	667	104	56,751	
SAT Subject Test in Chinese with Listening	Chinese	761	66	4,925	
SAT Subject Test in French	French	634	121	6,800	
SAT Subject Test in French with Listening	French	664	113	1,533	
SAT Subject Test in German	German	636	124	621	
SAT Subject Test in German with Listening	German	629	121	479	
SAT Subject Test in Modern Hebrew	Modern Hebrew	614	145	344	
SAT Subject Test in Italian	Italian	677	114	488	
SAT Subject Test in Japanese with Listening	Japanese	704	116	1,317	
SAT Subject Test in Korean with Listening	Korean	764	64	1,891	
SAT Subject Test in Latin	Latin	632	109	2,483	
SAT Subject Test in Spanish with Listening	Spanish	660	108	2,914	

Every test was a one-hour timed test. Historically, the exception to the one-hour time was the writing test, which was divided into a 20-minute essay question and a 40-minute multiple-choice section. The writing test was discontinued in January 2005.

=== Tests discontinued earlier ===
- Writing Subject Test
- English Language Proficiency Test (ELPT)

These were discontinued after January 2005 when the SAT II in Writing was incorporated into the SAT.

== Tests in the 1970s ==
There were 17 different tests for the 1971–1972 school year:

Test	Mean score	Notes
Achievement Test in American History and Social Studies	486	
Achievement Test in Biology	524	
Achievement Test in Chemistry	575	
Achievement Test in English Composition	512	Sometimes had an essay component
Achievement Test in European History and World Cultures	520	
Achievement Test in French	524/539	Offered with listening component on some testing dates
Achievement Test in German	525/534	Offered with listening component on some testing dates
Greek Achievement Test		Classical language (offered by arrangement)
Achievement Test in Hebrew	573	Modern language
Achievement Test in Italian	542	Always offered with listening component
Achievement Test in Latin	520	Classical language
Achievement Test in Literature	523	
Achievement Test in Mathematics Level I	543	For students with three years of college preparatory math
Achievement Test in Mathematics Level II	668	For students with four or more years of modern college preparatory math
Achievement Test in Physics	587	
Achievement Test in Russian	531	Always offered with listening component
Achievement Test in Spanish	513/526	Offered with listening component on some testing dates

== Scoring and admissions ==
Each test was scored on a scale of 200 to 800; however, on some tests, it was impossible to get a 200. For example, if someone got every question wrong on the Mathematics Level 2 test, they could receive a score of 310, depending on the test-specific curve. An exception was the ELPT, which was scored on a scale of 901 to 999. In addition, the foreign language tests that had both reading and listening components gave subscores for each in the 20 to 80 range.

Prior to the first administration of the new SAT Reasoning Test (which included the writing section) in March 2005, some highly selective colleges required applicants to take three SAT Subject Tests, including the writing test and two other tests of the applicant's choosing, in addition to the SAT. However, when writing became a standard component of the SAT Reasoning Test, most selective colleges recommended applicants submit scores for any two SAT Subject Tests. Engineering schools might recommend or require Chemistry or Physics and Math Level 2. No schools required three Subject Tests and Georgetown was the only remaining school to 'strongly recommend' taking three Subject Tests.

The California Institute of Technology, which previously required subject tests, no longer required or considered them as of 2020.

Schools also varied with regard to their SAT Subject Test requirements of students submitting scores for the ACT in place of the SAT: some schools considered the ACT an alternative to both the SAT and some SAT Subject Tests, whereas others accepted the ACT but required SAT Subject Tests as well. Information about a school's specific test requirements could typically be found on its official website.

In October 2002, the College Board decided to drop the "Score Choice" option for exams, due to the fact that it disproportionately benefited wealthier students taking the exam who could afford to take it multiple times. Score Choice meant that scores were not released to colleges until the student approved the score after seeing it. However, the "Score Choice" option was reinstated as of the March 2009 test, allowing test takers to again choose whether or not to send scores.

=== Answer sheet ===
The answer sheet had room for 115 answers; however, no test had more than 95 questions. 1–100 were standard multiple-choice bubbles and 101–115 were for 'relationship analysis questions', which were only used for the chemistry exam. The biology test was the only test to use answers 96–100; questions 1–60 were common to both the E and M tests, in addition, the E used 61–80, and the M used 81–100.

== Discontinuation ==
The subject tests and the optional SAT essay were discontinued on January 19, 2021, for U.S. students and in June 2021 for international students. This was done as a response to changes in college admissions due to the impact of the COVID-19 pandemic on education. The discontinuation was also due to preference for Advanced Placement courses and their respective exams.

== See also ==
- College admissions in the United States
- SAT
- ACT (American College Testing)
