= PSAT/NMSQT =

High school standardized test

Preliminary SAT/National Merit Scholarship Qualifying Test
- Logo since 2017
- Acronym: PSAT/NMSQT
- Type: Computer-based standardized test
- Administrator: College Board, NMSC
- Skills tested: Reading, mathematics
- Duration: 2 hours 14 minutes
- Score range: 160–760 for two sections, adding up to a maximum score of 1520
- Offered: High school juniors, sophomores, and freshmen (only in some schools)

The Preliminary SAT/National Merit Scholarship Qualifying Test (PSAT/NMSQT) is a standardized test administered by the College Board and cosponsored by the National Merit Scholarship Corporation (NMSC) in the United States. In the 2018–2019 school year, 2.27 million high school sophomores and 1.74 million high school juniors took the PSAT.

Scores from the PSAT/NMSQT are used to determine eligibility and qualification for the National Merit Scholarship Program.

== History ==
The PSAT has been administered every fall since 1971. Some PSAT scores obtained before June 1993 are accepted as qualifying evidence for admission to intellectual clubs such as Intertel and American Mensa.

Prior to 1997, the PSAT was composed of only Math and Verbal sections. The Verbal section received a double weighting to allow a full composite score of 240 points. The Writing Skills section, introduced in 1997, was partially derived from the discontinued Test of Standard Written English (TSWE).

The PSAT changed its format and content in Fall 2015. Originally, each of the three sections was scored on a scale of 20 to 80 points, adding up to a maximum composite score of 240 points. This paralleled the SAT, which is graded on a scale of 200 to 800 for each section (the narrower range is to distinguish from which test a score comes and to denote less accuracy). However, unlike the old (2005) SAT, the old PSAT did not include higher-level mathematics (e.g. concepts from Algebra II) or an essay in its writing section (which was added to the SAT in 2005). The number of multiple-choice answers was reduced from five to four, improving the likelihood of making a successful guess, and the quarter-point penalty for wrong answers was eliminated.

Like the SAT, College Board transitioned the PSAT to all digital in Fall 2023.

== Format and scoring ==
Students register for the exam through high schools that are members of the College Board. The test is composed of two sections: 1) Reading and Writing and 2) Math. Each section has two modules. Each Reading and Writing module lasts 32 minutes, and each Math module lasts 35 minutes, for a total of 2 hours and 14 minutes.

The PSAT changed its format and content again in the Fall of 2023, continuing the transition to digital tests. The Reading and Writing Sections are combined into one section score, and the Math section now allows calculators on all sections. The scores for both sections range from 160 to 760, adding up to a maximum score of 1520. A Selection Index Score is calculated by doubling the Reading and Writing section score, adding the Math section score, and dividing the total by ten.

Comparison of Current and Previous PSAT
	Pre-2015 PSAT	2015–2023 PSAT	2023–Current PSAT
Test Sections	Critical Reading; Mathematics; Writing	Evidence-Based Reading and Writing; Mathematics	Reading and Writing; Mathematics
Number of Questions per Section	Critical Reading: 48; Mathematics: 39; Writing: 125	Critical Reading: 47; Writing and Language:44; Mathematics: 47 (17 no calculator + 31 calculator)	Reading and Writing: 54 (2 modules of 27); Mathematics: 44 (2 modules of 22)
Total Number of Questions	125	139	98
Scores per Section	Critical Reading: 20–80; Mathematics: 20–80; Writing: 20–80	Evidence-Based Reading and Writing: 160–760; Mathematics: 160–760	Reading and Writing: 54 (2 modules of 27); Mathematics: 44 (2 modules of 22)
Composite Scores	60–240	320–1520	320–1520
Format	Paper	Paper	Digital

=== Levels of recognition ===
There are three levels of recognition: "Commended", Semi-Finalists, and Finalists. About 34,000 students, which is 3–4% of all PSAT takers, are "commended" and receive Letters of Commendation.

The "commended" cutoff is determined at whichever score yields the 96th percentile nationally. It rose from 202 for the 2006 Program (2004 PSAT) to 203 for the 2007 Program (2005 PSAT). It was 205 for the 2008 Program (2006 PSAT) and 209 for the 2009 Program (2007 PSAT).

Students are confirmed as semifinalists as seniors, one year after taking the PSAT. Afterward, students must complete an application to become finalists that includes grade point average, extracurricular activities, school recommendations, and awards and honors alongside a confirming SAT or ACT score. Approximately 95% of semifinalists qualify as finalists as of 2024.

== Popular culture ==
In recent years, it has become a popular subject of discourse among test-takers on various social media networks. Many of them poke fun at passages or questions in the PSAT that they find strange or amusing. The level of discussion is so significant that in 2013, the hashtag #PSAT reached trending status on Twitter near its administration date. This is in spite of the fact that, since 2012, test participants have been required to copy and sign a statement agreeing to test regulations that include not discussing the test.

Previously, this statement had to be written in cursive, a requirement that drew ire from both students and teachers, as many students found writing the statement in cursive to be unnecessarily difficult. However, in 2015, the requirement to write the statement in cursive was removed.

== See also ==
- SAT
- PLAN (a preliminary ACT test)
