= Harry Burns (activist) =

American civil rights activist

Harry Victory Burns (November 11, 1922 – 2000) was an American civil rights leader from San Antonio, Texas. He was named by his mother for the pre-Veterans Day, which was Victory Day. During the 1940s and 1950s, Burns was the president of the San Antonio NAACP Branch. During the Civil Rights Movement, he worked with Martin Luther King Jr. and Thurgood Marshall. He went on to organize marches throughout the city along with others such as Rev. Claude Black, Charles Hudspeth, G J Sutton, Ethel Minor and others.
