= Realizing the Dream =

Realizing the Dream, Inc. is a 501(c)(3) non-profit organization founded in 2006 by Martin Luther King III to carry on the legacy of his parents, Dr. Martin Luther King Jr. and Mrs. Coretta Scott King. Located in Atlanta, Georgia, the organization carries out initiatives on both the domestic and international level. The mission of Realizing the Dream is "To champion freedom, justice, and equality by working to eliminate poverty, build community and foster peace through nonviolence." Two of Realizing the Dream's main projects are the 50 Communities Network, an effort against American poverty, and the Generation II Global Peace Initiative, a peace-building team composed of sons, daughters and grandchildren of leading 20th century activists.

== Programs ==
According to its website and promotional materials, Realizing the Dream's work consists of five separate programs:

The Poverty Project seeks to redress poverty both in the United States and throughout the world. The domestic aspect of the program is the Poverty in America project, which "is a national call to leadership aimed at fueling local efforts to ignite sustainable private investment in communities carrying the legacy of the King name." The effort is focused on the "50 Communities Network," which is a "coalition of community organizers, organizations, and local leadership with whom Mr. King has visited, toured, and engaged since the inception of Realizing the Dream, Inc." The international component of the effort is currently in development, but Realizing the Dream has begun to establish it through recent visits to India, Kenya, Serbia and Bosnia and Herzegovina.

Generation II Global Peace (Gen II) brings together the second generation of some of the 20th century's most prominent peace icons to address instances of conflict and injustice worldwide. According to Realizing the Dream's website, the program was launched in London, England in July 2007, with the inaugural members being King Abdullah II of Jordan; Christine Chavez-Delgado; Nadim Gemayel; Saad Hariri; Kerry Kennedy; Martin Luther King III; Cheml Peres; Dalia Rabin-Pelossof; Justin Trudeau; and Naomi Tutu.

International Youth Corps is a leadership development program for young people, aged 18–35, who are recruited to join Realizing the Dream on international trips. The Corps has engaged in two separate journeys to date, the first to Israel in March 2008 and the second to Kenya in March 2009.

International Fellows Institute is a virtual academy of scholars focused on international research in pressing global topics regarding redressing poverty, building community and fostering peace.

International Scholars Intern Program provides selected students and recent graduates the opportunity to engage in substantive internships in the United States and throughout the world with scholars who are Realizing the Dream International Fellows.

== Awards and summits ==
In October 2008, Realizing the Dream hosted a national conference in Washington, D.C. entitled the "Summit to Realize the Dream". The event focused on the issues of poverty, civic engagement and violence and was cosponsored by several other national organizations, including the National Urban League, Half in Ten Campaign, Points of Light Institute, ServiceNation, Southern Christian Leadership Conference, Spotlight on Poverty and Opportunity, and YouthBuild USA. Some of the speakers and panelists who participated in the event were Dr. Jeffrey Sachs, Hon. Jack Kemp, Congressman John Lewis, Jim Wallis of Sojourners, former Senator Harris Wofford, Thomas Sander of Harvard University, Alan Khazei of Be the Change, Inc. and Dorothy Stoneman of YouthBuild.

Realizing the Dream has also presented various awards to prominent American and international activists. At the "Realizing the Dream Awards" during President Obama's inauguration weekend in January 2009, the organization honored Congressman John Lewis with the 'Drum Major Award' for his lifetime of work for civil rights and nonviolence; others honored at the same event included Senator Edward Kennedy (D-MA), Reverend Claude Black of San Antonio and democracy-activist Aung San Suu Kyi of Burma. The previous year, Martin Luther King III and Realizing the Dream presented former President Bill Clinton with the 'Realizing the Dream Award' for his continued humanitarian work around the world.

== See also ==
- King Center for Nonviolent Social Change
