= Ethel Minor =

American civil rights activist

- Born: November 26, 1922
- Died: June 25, 2012 (aged 89)
- Resting place: San Antonio, Texas
- Occupation: Political figure

Ethel Minor (November 26, 1922 – June 25, 2012) was an American political figure and civil rights activist.

Minor was raised in Columbus, Texas and returned to San Antonio in 1944 to work at Kelly Air Force Base. During her time as a civilian working on the base, she advocated and fought for equal treatment of employees.

Along with local civil rights leaders such as the Rev. Claude Black, Harry Burns, G J Sutton, Charles Hudspeth and others, Ms. Minor participated in marches and protests throughout Bexar County. She also served as church secretary of Antioch Missionary Baptist Church.

From 1986 to 1996, Ms. Minor was the president of the San Antonio Branch of the NAACP. During her time as president, she would organize the San Antonio Annual Martin Luther King Jr. Day March Celebration. The march has grown to become the largest annual civil rights celebration in the country with over 100,000 participants. After retiring from her role as president in 1997, Minor was approached by her community and asked to re-assume the post. She was again reelected in 2003.
