= List of people from Muskogee, Oklahoma =

A person who lives in or comes from Muskogee, Oklahoma, USA is called an Okie from Muskogee (although many consider the term disparaging). This is a list of well-known people who were born or lived in the city of Muskogee.

== A ==
- Reubin O'Donovan Askew

== B ==
- ZerNona Black
- Dan Boren
- Don Byas

== C ==
- Xernona Clayton
- Tom Coburn
- Gene Conley
- Eddie Crowder

== E ==
- Drew Edmondson
- Ed Edmondson
- J. Howard Edmondson
- James E. Edmondson
- Joseph L. Epps

== F ==
- George Faught

== G ==
- Sandy Garrett

== H ==
- John Tyler Hammons
- E. Summers Hardy
- Charles N. Haskell
- Joan Hill

== J ==
- Dennis Jernigan
- James R. Jones

== K ==
- James Kemp
- L. R. Kershaw
- Barney Kessel
- Leo Kottke

== M ==
- Harold MacDowell
- Roberta McCain
- Stacy McGee
- Jay McShann
- Bill Mercer
- William W. Momyer

== O ==
- Jack Oakie

== R ==
- Joe A. Rector
- Robert Reed
- John N. Reese, Jr.
- Thomas Ryan

== S ==
- Jerry L. Smith
- Berton E. Spivy, Jr.

== T ==
- Robert Thomas
- Jerome Tiger
- Martin E. Trapp

== U ==
- Carrie Underwood

== V ==
- Sarah Vowell

== W ==
- Pat Waak
- Les Walrond
- Robyn Watkins

== See also ==
- Muskogee, Oklahoma
