= Return yards =

Gridiron football statistic

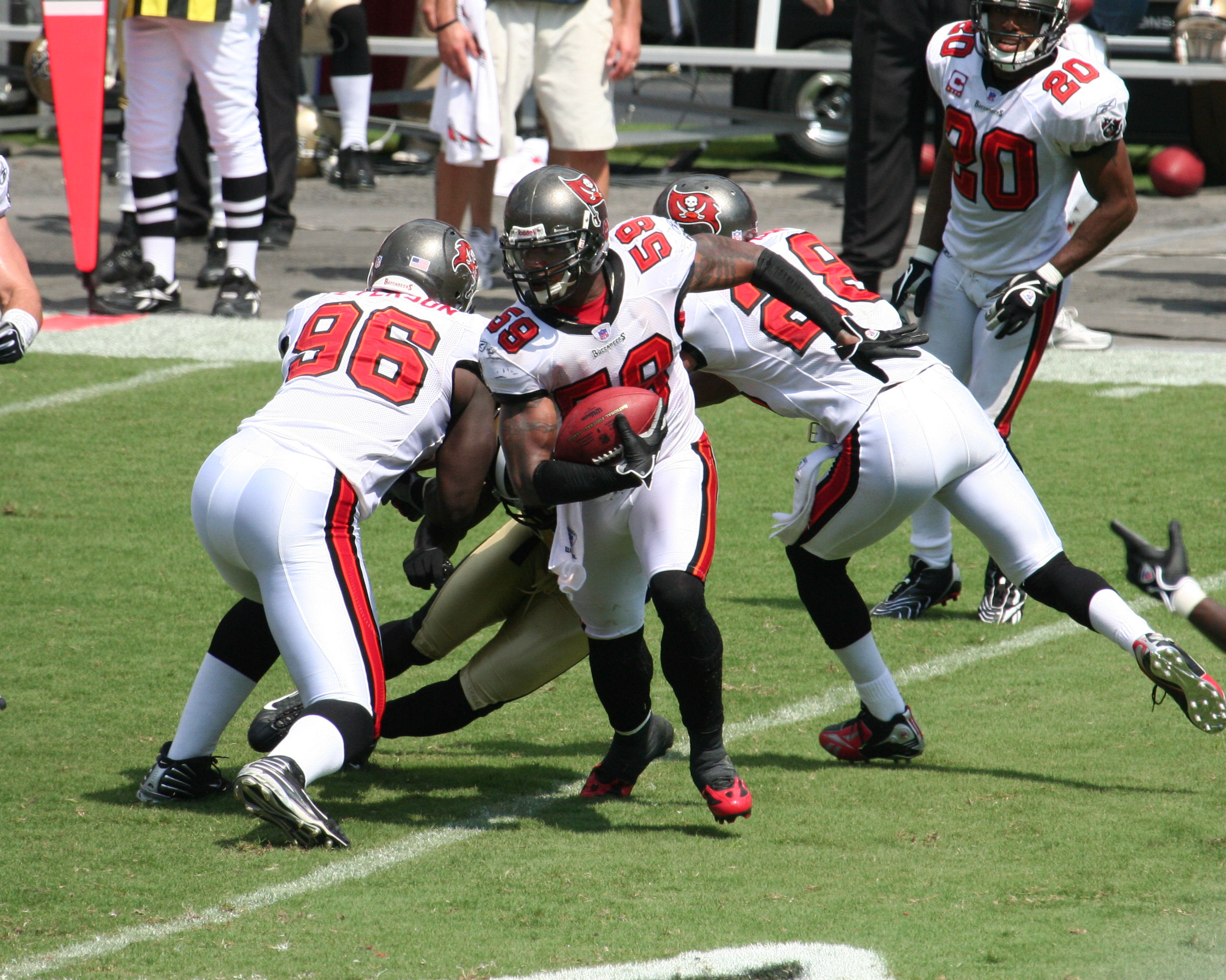
Cato June is shown returning his first regular season interception for the Tampa Bay Buccaneers on September 16, 2007.

Return yards is a gridiron football statistical measure that takes several forms. In American and Canadian football, progress is measured by advancing the football towards the opposing team's goal line. Progress can be made during play by the offensive team by advancing the ball from its point of progress at the start of play known as the line of scrimmage or by the defensive team after taking possession of the football via a change of possession (such as punt, kickoff, interception, punt block, blocked kick or fumble). When the defensive team advances the ball during play after a change in possession, yardage is credited from the point of the change of possession. Return specialists are commonly monitored statistically for their totals and averages. However, other types of return yardage such as interception return yards are also measured because the point on the field where a change in possession occurs is marked.

Kick return yards and punt return yards result from voluntary change in possession and most of the others result from involuntary forms of change in possession known as turnovers. Often kick return and punt return statistics are aggregated. and sometimes they are added to yards from scrimmage to yield all-purpose yards. When kick return yards and punt return yards are aggregated they are known as combined return yards or more formally, combined kick return yards.

== See also ==
- Glossary of American football
