= Ruth Jones McClendon =

American politician

Ruth Elizabeth Jones McClendon (5 October 1943 – 19 December 2017) was an American politician.

McClendon was born in Houston on 5 October 1943, and graduated from Phillis Wheatley High School before attending Texas Southern University as an undergraduate and earning a master's degree from Webster University.

She originally contested the open seat of Lou Nelle Sutton in 1988, but lost District 120 of the Texas House of Representatives to Karyne Jones Conley. Between June 1993 and August 1996, McClendon was a member of the San Antonio City Council from District 2. After Conley resigned her state legislative seat in July 1996, McClendon won a special election and was seated on 12 November 1996, succeeding a fellow Democrat and African-American in office. In all subsequent legislative elections, McClendon won no less than 85% of the vote.

She resigned from the state legislature on 31 January 2016, and died in San Antonio of brain cancer on 19 December 2017.
