= Karyne =

Karyne is a feminine given name of English and French origin, derived from the given name Karen. It used in England, Australia, United States, Canada and other English-speaking countries.

== Notable people ==
Notable people with this given name include:

- Karyne Jones Conley (born 1953), American politician
- Karyne Di Marco (born 1978), Australian female hammer thrower
- Karyne Steben (born 1974), Canadian trapeze artist

== See also ==
- Karyn
- Karen
- Karine
