= Charles Hudspeth =

Charles Hudspeth may refer to:

- Charles Hudspeth (activist) (1918–1999), civil rights leader from San Antonio, Texas
- Charles Hudspeth (convict) (died 1892), American executed convict later proven to be wrongfully convicted of murder
