= Youth On Board =

Youth empowerment program

Youth on Board (YOB) was a nonprofit youth empowerment program based in the Boston, Massachusetts area for more than 20 years. It was a youth-led, adult supported program that operated in more than 5 countries, 27 states, and over 100 schools. It was a project of YouthBuild USA.

== Background ==
YOB was founded by Karen Young after working as a national student organizer with Campus Outreach Opportunity League (COOL). In 1993 Karen met Jenny Sazama and received initial funding from the W.K. Kellogg Foundation. Jenny was brought in as YOB's associate director and later became co-director with Karen. Jenny became the director of Youth on Board when Karen moved on to do other projects in 2010.

YOB is widely known for the contributions to Project 540, a national student engagement program for 100,000 students in more than 100 high schools across the country. With funding from several sources, including the W.K. Kellogg Foundation, and Boston Public Schools, Youth on Board has published numerous important materials. Most notable is 15 Points to Successfully Involving Youth in Decision-Making. Other publications by YOB include Board Service by Young People.

In 2014, YOB was one of eight organizations selected by the Susan Crown Exchange to be part of their research and documentation project on social emotional learning called Preparing Youth to Thrive.

== Local organizing work ==
Boston Student Advisory Council (BSAC)

The Boston Student Advisory Council (BSAC) is a group of student leaders from Boston Public Schools who work on issues that affect young people both inside and outside of school. BSAC is made up entirely of low-income students of color who, as key stakeholders, are at the center of the decisions that affect them the most. Through a partnership with the school district, YOB co-administers this citywide body of student leaders that represent most high schools in the district.

== National work ==
Consulting and Technical Assistance

Youth on Board provided trainings and technical assistance in various areas, including youth/adult partnership, youth leadership development, adultism, and student advisory council establishment.

Support the Youth Voice in Decision-Making Movement

YOB supported youth voice in decision-making on a local and national level through speaking engagements, coalitions, consultations, writing articles, participating in research studies, and writing and selling publications. They were regularly called upon by foundations, think tanks, Federal and State Departments of Education, media outlets, and researchers.
