= Lou Nelle Sutton =

American businesswoman and politician

Lou Nelle Sutton (née Callahan; December 20, 1905 – July 1, 1994) was a businesswoman and former state representative from San Antonio, Texas.

Born Lou Nelle Callahan, she married Garlington "G. J." Sutton in 1958. Together they would raise his daughter Jeffrey Dean Sutton. With the encouragement of her husband's best friend Claude Black, Sutton ran and succeeded her late husband in the Texas House of Representatives She represented her district from 1976 to 1987.

Sutton owned and operated Sutton and Sutton Mortuary and Gates of Heaven Memorial Gardens in San Antonio until her death in July 1994. She is interred next to her husband in that cemetery.

Preceded by G. J. Sutton	Member of the Texas House of Representatives from District 57-E (San Antonio); 1976–1983	Succeeded by Obsolete district
Preceded by Harold M. LaFont	Member of the Texas House of Representatives from District 120 (San Antonio); 1983–1989	Succeeded by Karyne Jones Conley
