= Dorothy Stoneman =

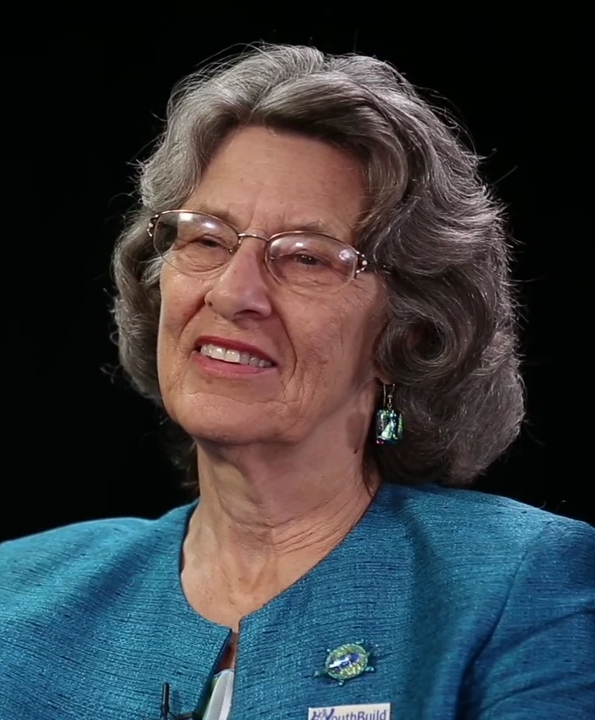
Stoneman in 2014

Dorothy Stoneman (born c. 1942) is the founder and former CEO of YouthBuild USA, Inc. and former chairman of the YouthBuild Coalition, with over 1,000 member organizations in 45 states, Washington, D.C. and the Virgin Islands. She has been widely recognized for her contributions to the civil rights movements, poverty elimination efforts, and the emergence of the youth development field in the United States. Among the numerous awards she has received, Stoneman was awarded a MacArthur "genius" Fellowship (1996), and the Skoll Award for Social Entrepreneurship (2007).

== Early life and education ==
Stoneman was born and raised in Belmont, Massachusetts. She graduated from Belmont High School in 1959. She received her B.A. in history and science from Harvard University in 1963. The following year she moved to New York City and joined the civil rights movement through the Harlem Action Group. Stoneman lived and worked in Harlem for the next 24 years, receiving her M.A. in early childhood education from Bank Street College of Education in 1972. She received an honorary Doctorate of Humane Letters from Bank Street College of Education in 1994.

== Early career ==
Stoneman began her work in Harlem in 1964 by organizing summer preschool programs for children who were entering first grade with no early education. She began her teaching career at PS 92 in Harlem, as a second-grade teacher. In 1965, Stoneman became a Head Start teacher at the East Harlem Block Schools and, in 1969, was promoted by parents who made up the board of directors, to executive director.

== YouthBuild ==
In 1978, Stoneman founded the Youth Action Program, under the aegis of the East Harlem Block Schools, when she organized groups of local teenagers to undertake a variety of community improvement projects of their own design. One of these was a project to rebuild an abandoned building in East Harlem; this became the model for YouthBuild. Stoneman created the Youth Action Program to "mobilize teenagers to become a positive force for change."

In 1984, she led the city-wide expansion of the housing construction program, and in 1988 she began a national replication of the program model that had by then been named YouthBuild. In 1990, she established YouthBuild USA as an independent nonprofit to continue to spread the YouthBuild program nationwide. By 1992, Stoneman was overseeing 20 YouthBuild programs across 11 states.

Stoneman worked with then-Massachusetts Senator John Kerry to develop legislation which would authorize YouthBuild as a federal program. The bill was passed in 1992, signed into law by President George H. W. Bush, and funded within the US Department of Housing and Urban Development. As a result of its ongoing success under Stoneman's leadership, the federal YouthBuild program has received bipartisan support through five administrations, resulting in over 250 YouthBuild programs in the United States, the distribution to local nonprofit and public sponsoring organizations of over $1.4 billion of federal funds and the production of over 28,000 units of affordable housing by over 130,000 YouthBuild students. In 2001, Stoneman oversaw the beginning of YouthBuild's international expansion in South Africa, which spread to 21 counties by 2016.

YouthBuild programs enable young low-income people to “rebuild their communities and their lives, breaking the cycle of poverty with a commitment to work, education, family and community." The YouthBuild program has five core components: Construction, education, personal counseling, leadership development and graduate opportunity. Students spend every other week on a job site, learning the construction trade by building affordable homes for their own communities, while working toward earning a GED or high school diploma. 93 percent of students have left high school without a diploma prior to YouthBuild, and about one-third have been court-involved. The program, provides both housing for low-income residents and gives students the opportunity to gain experience utilizing marketable job skills, while completing their high school education and preparing for college. It addresses in one intervention the key issues facing low-income communities: Education, employment, violence, leadership development, and affordable housing. YouthBuild programs are now funded by the US Department of Labor, which provides funding directly to local community-based organizations through an annual competitive process. YouthBuild USA provides training and technical assistance to these federal grantees under contract with the US Department of Labor, and also leads a national affiliated network of YouthBuild programs that choose to contribute to the YouthBuild movement whether or not they are funded by the federal government in any particular year.

In 2012, Stoneman orchestrated the founding and development of the National Council of Young Leaders, which in 2015 launched a national grassroots movement of low-income young adults called Opportunity Youth United. When Stoneman retired from her role as CEO of YouthBuild USA in 2017 she was succeeded by John Valverde. Stoneman directed her full-time attention to her role as assistant to the director of Opportunity Youth United until Feb. 2023. In 2023 she began a project called YouthCreate under the sponsorship of the Rockefeller Philanthropy Advisors. It is designed to create a national network of non-profits supporting low-income teenagers to create community improvement projects of their own design.

== Honors and awards ==
- 1996, awarded a MacArthur “Genius” Fellowship
- 2000, awarded the Independent Sector's John Gardner Leadership Award
- 2007, awarded the international Skoll Award for Social Entrepreneurship
- 2008, selected by Ashoka as a senior fellow
- 2008, identified by Nonprofit Times as one of the 50 most influential nonprofit leaders
- 2012, received Harvard Call to Service award
- 2012, named a Champion of Change by the White House
- 2013, invited to speak at the 50th anniversary of the March on Washington for Jobs and Freedom
- 2017, received the America's Promise award from America's Promise
- 2017, received the US Green Building Council's Leadership Award

== Boards and councils ==
As of 2023, Stoneman serves as chairperson of the board of the original YouthBuild program in East Harlem; the Youth Action Action Programs and Homes, Inc.; a member of Harvard University's National Advisory Board for Public Service; member of the advisory boards for Opportunity Youth United, and for New Politics; and facilitator of the Beyond Ferguson group in Belmont MA, Bridging Racial and Class Divides.

== See also ==
- Youth On Board
