= Destin Fishing Rodeo =

Fishing Tournament

The Destin Fishing Rodeo is a month-long fishing tournament that has been running continuously in the small fishing village of Destin, Florida since 1948. This year will mark 79 years of the Destin Fishing Rodeo.

== History ==
The rodeo began as a way for the small town to attract visitors during the shoulder or slow season when tourists did not visit the beach town. The first rodeo was held in 1948 and only had a few participants. Early prizes included kitchen appliances, beer, windshield wipers, and land in the area.

The Destin Fishing Rodeo was named a Rodeo in honor of the town's earliest permanent fishing inhabitants. Leonard Destin, the first settler of European descent to arrive in the area, and other fishermen like him used to corral the fish that they caught in pens built in the water just like cattle corralled at a rodeo. The pens were designed to hold fish and keep them alive before live wells were commonplace.

Today, prizes include vacations, fishing gear, and over $100,000 in cash prizes. After the success of the early rodeos, the event was moved to October to extend the tourist season past the warm summer months. The event worked and continues to grow in size every year. New events and attractions are added as the event grows. Categories that include the newest ways to catch fish, such as from paddle boards or kayaks, have been added along with Shark Saturdays for weighing in some of the large sharks caught during the tournament.

== Local Economic Impact ==
"In 2006 an estimated 36,518 anglers from 27 states and 5 countries (13,421 local) participated in the Rodeo." This equated into approximately $5.2 million of revenue for the local community.

== Categories ==
There are junior, teen, ladies, and senior divisions. Prizes are awarded daily, weekly, and overall. Specific species categories vary by year as federal and state fishing regulations change. A Rules Committee meets every year and determines all angler and fish eligibility rules. There are over 75 rules governing the rodeo, but the three main rules are:

General Rodeo Rules

- Anglers must declare division of entry at the time of weigh-in.
- Anglers cannot win multiple awards for a single fish (excluding bonus and jackpot awards).
- The Destin Fishing Rodeo Rules Committee governs all activities related to angler and fish eligibility,

Weigh-Ins

The Destin Fishing Rodeo hosts daily weigh-ins from 11am CST to 7pm CST behind AJ's Seafood & Oyster Bar on the Destin Harbor. The tournament leaderboard is displayed right next to the weigh-in dock. All categories are displayed on the leaderboard and updated daily. For viewers, there is also a small grandstand underneath the leaderboard.

== See also ==
- Tropical Smoothie Cafe
