= Taj Matthews =

American journalist

Taj Matthews (born March 24, 1976, in San Antonio, Texas) is an American journalist, entrepreneur, author of Grandpa was a Preacher: A Letter to my Grandson. The book is the autobiography of his grandfather civil rights icon Rev. Claude Black Jr., who describes life as a minister, civil rights leader and politician. After nearly 20 years, Matthews returned to his hometown of San Antonio, Texas, from Jacksonville, Florida. He currently serves as Executive Director of the Claude & ZerNona Black Developmental Leadership Foundation
