= Will June =

United States Air Force veteran

Wilbert June is a United States Air Force veteran who has become notable for bowling consecutive perfect games in sanctioned league play at the age of 75. He is the grandfather of Cato June.

== Bowling career ==
June established the United States Bowling Congress (USBC) record as the oldest player to bowl consecutive 300-games on August 31, 2010, at the age of 75. He bowled a total of 32 consecutive strikes including the second and third of his Tuesday Young At Heart Senior bowling League games at the Brunswick Moreno Valley Bowl in Moreno Valley, California. These were the first two perfect games of his 35-year bowling career. The final eight strikes of his streak came on September 1, 2010, during the following day when he made strikes in his first eight frames in his Wednesday West Coast Funtime League game. The 16-pound (7.3 kg) bowling ball that he uses was not custom drilled. June received a 300 ring and certificate on November 16, 2010. At the time of his feat he had a 210 league average in his Monday night league. Will is regarded as the first to achieve back-to-back perfect games at the Brunswick Moreno Valley Bowl. As late as December 2010 the accomplishment was described as one accomplished by one of the oldest athletes to have achieved it. However, a national Bowling magazine noted it was a USBC record in May 2011.

== Personal life ==
His wife is Sayan and they raised four children. One of his grandsons is National Football League Pro Bowler and Super Bowl XLI champion linebacker Cato June.

June is a 20-year United States Air Force veteran, who served in North Africa and California. After retiring at age 40, he began bowling regularly, although he had once played at age 30 and had a 200 in his first game.
