= Destin, Florida =

- City
- City of Destin
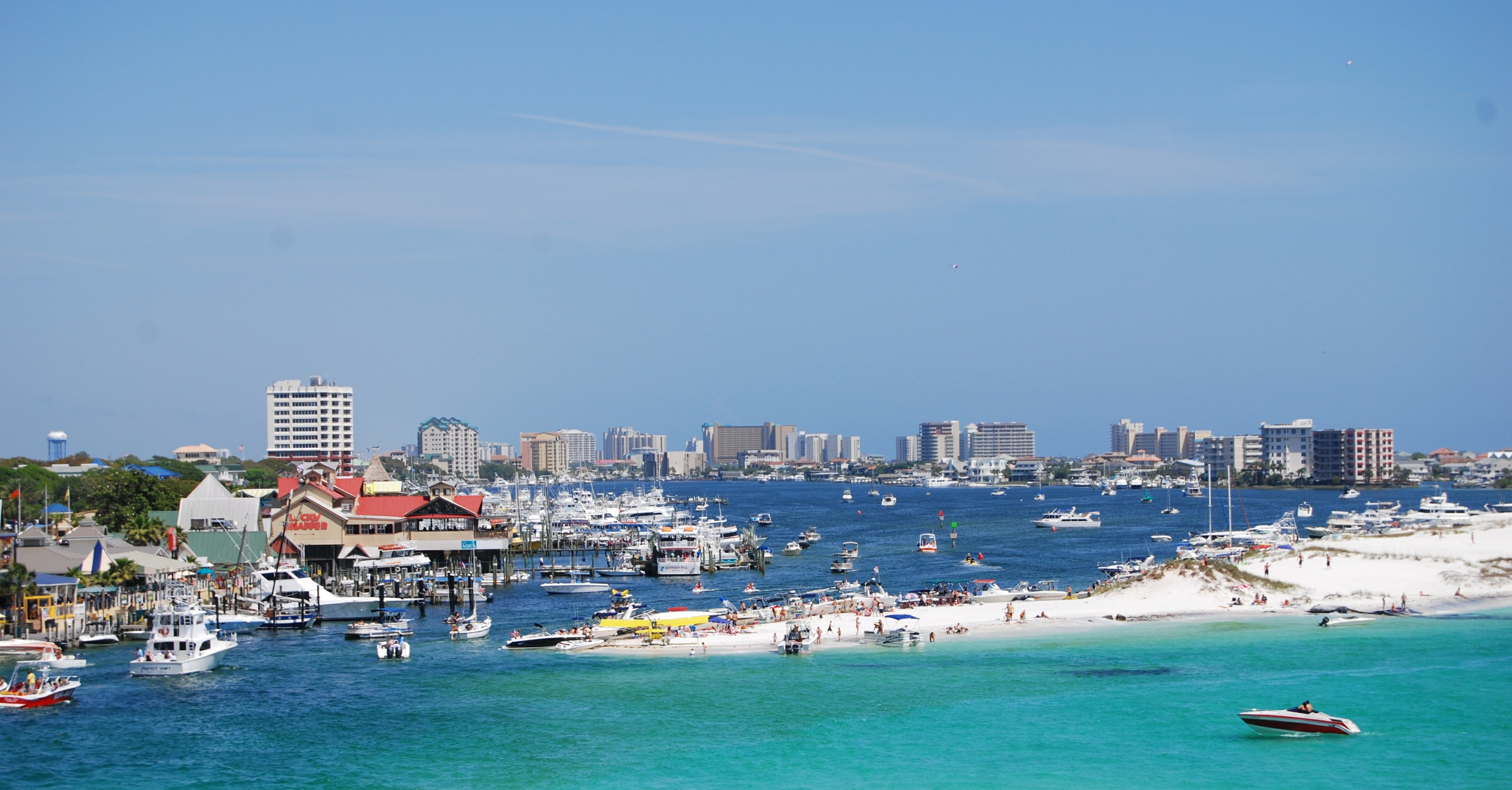
- View of Destin from the Destin Harbor

- Seal
- Nickname: "World's Luckiest Fishing Village"
- Location in Okaloosa County and the state of Florida
- Interactive map of Destin, Florida
- Coordinates: 30°23′22″N 86°29′01″W
- Country: United States
- State: Florida
- County: Okaloosa
- Incorporated: 1984

Government
  - Type: Council–manager

Area
  - Total: 7.66 sq mi (19.83 km^{2})
  - Land: 7.49 sq mi (19.41 km^{2})
  - Water: 0.16 sq mi (0.42 km^{2})
- Elevation: 20 ft (6.1 m)

Population (2020)
  - Total: 13,931
  - Density: 1,859.1/sq mi (717.82/km^{2})
- Time zone: UTC-6 (CST)
  - Summer (DST): UTC-5 (CDT)
- ZIP codes: 32540-32541
- Area code: 850
- FIPS code: 12-17325
- GNIS feature ID: 2404223
- Website: www.cityofdestin.com

Destin is a city in Okaloosa County, Florida, United States. It is a principal city of the Crestview–Fort Walton Beach–Destin, Florida metropolitan statistical area. Its population was 13,931 at the 2020 census, up from 12,305 at the 2010 census.

Destin is on Florida's Emerald Coast and known for its white beaches and emerald green waters. Originally a small fishing village, it is now a popular tourist destination. According to the Florida Department of Environmental Protection, over 80% of the Emerald Coast's 4.5 million visitors each year visit Destin. The city calls itself "the World's Luckiest Fishing Village" and claims to have Florida's largest fishing vessel fleet.

The city is on a peninsula separating the Gulf of Mexico from Choctawhatchee Bay. The peninsula was originally a barrier island, but hurricanes and sea-level changes gradually connected it to the mainland. In the 1940s, it technically became an island again with the completion of the Choctawhatchee-West Bay Canal.

== History ==
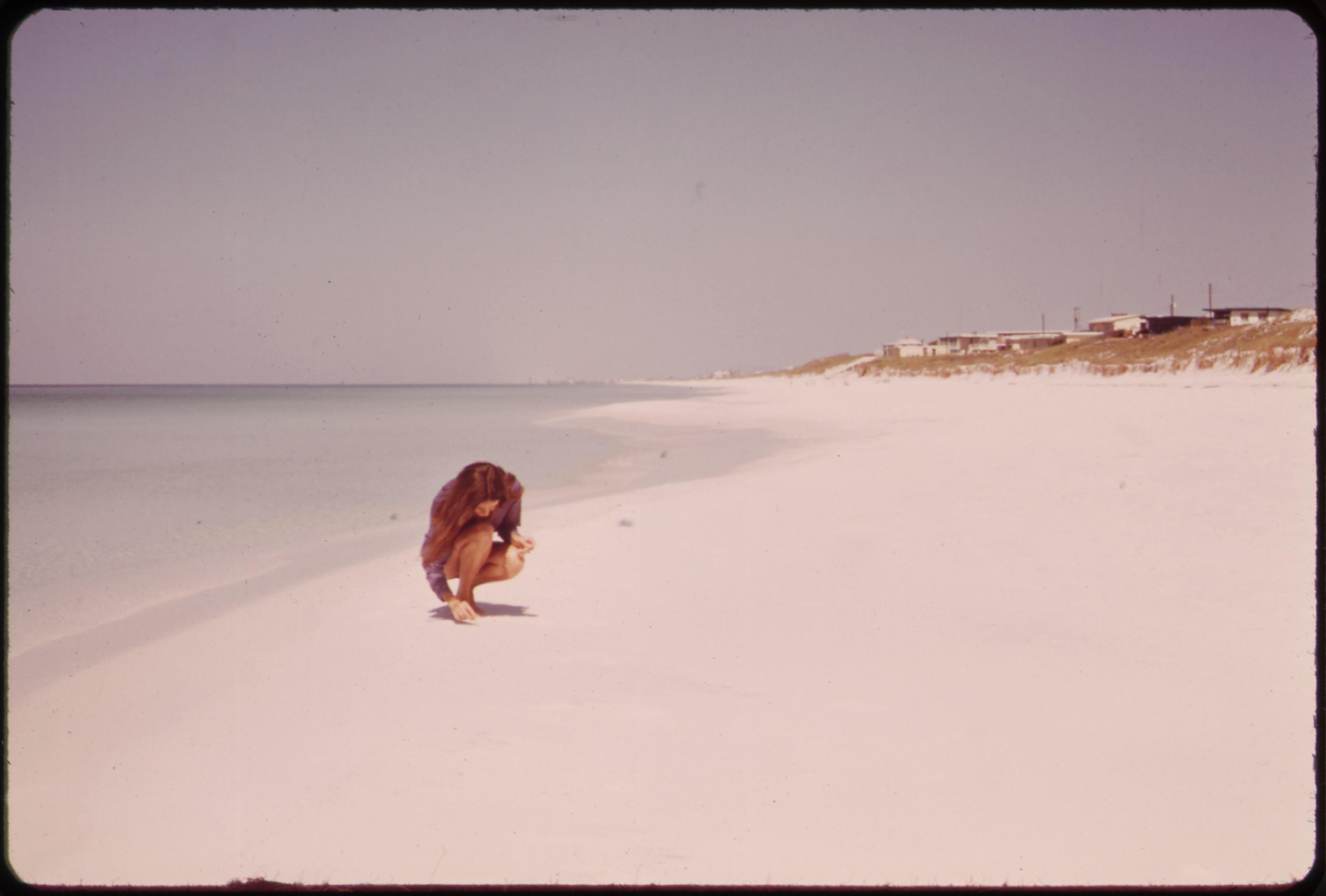
Beach at Destin, 1973

Destin is named after Leonard Destin, a New London, Connecticut, fishing captain who settled in the area between 1845 and 1850. He built a New England colonial home at the location of the Moreno Point military reservation. Destin and his descendants fished the area for decades.

Condominiums were first built in Destin during the 1970s, and Destin incorporated as a municipality in 1984. The city has experienced rapid growth since the 1980s.

On October, 9, 2026, Hurricane Isaias made landfall in Destin city limits as a weakening Category 2 Hurricane.

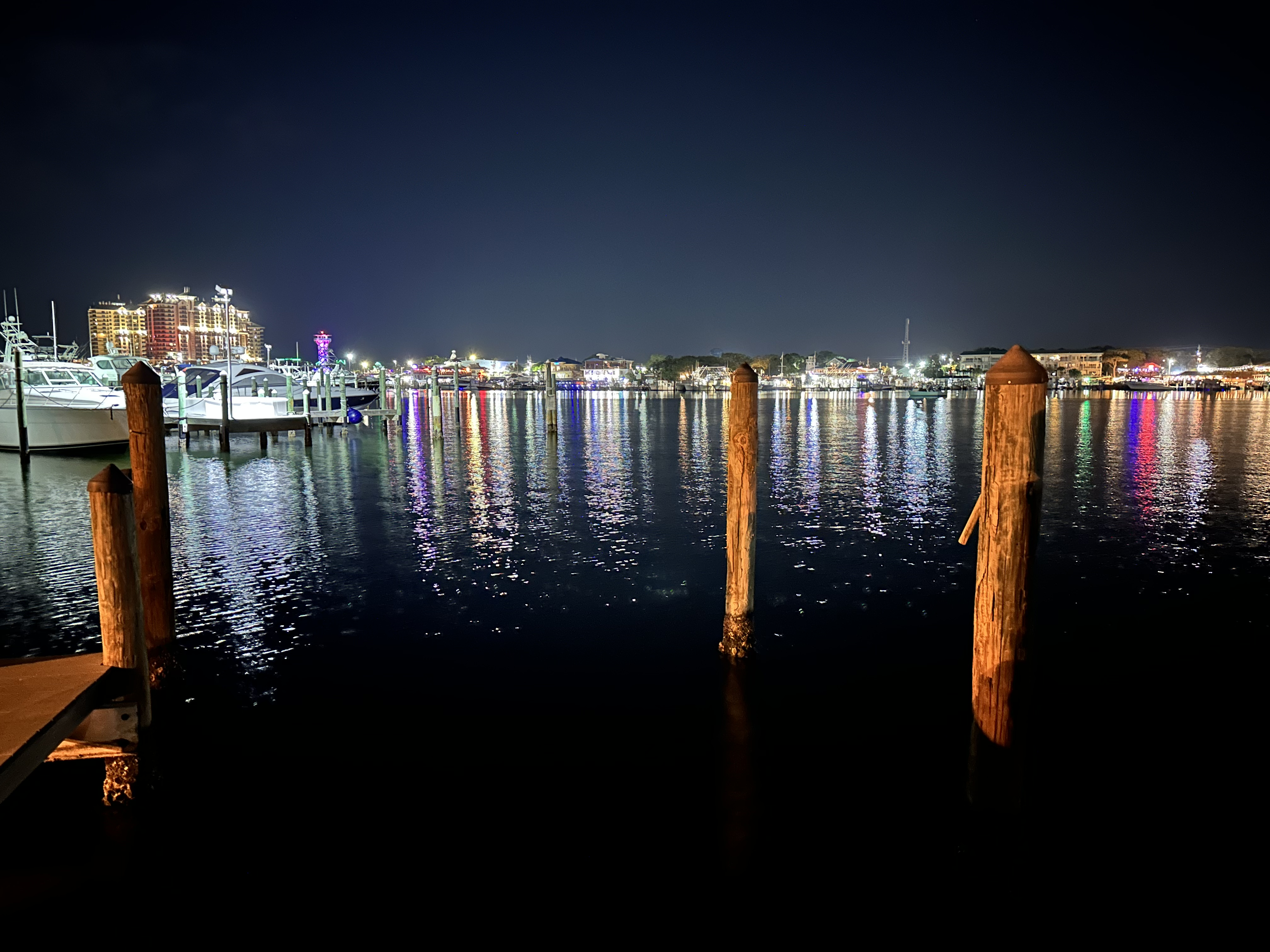
Destin Harbor at Night

== Geography ==
Destin is on a peninsula separating the Gulf of Mexico from Choctawhatchee Bay. The peninsula was originally an island, but hurricanes and sea-level changes gradually connected the island to the mainland.

Destin is near several other cities in the region. Fort Walton Beach is to the west, at the inlet of Santa Rosa Sound into Choctawhatchee Bay. North of Destin, across the bay, is Niceville, with the Mid-Bay Bridge linking the two by road. US 98 is the main route through the city, running from west to east. US 98 leads east 56 mi (90 km) to Panama City and west 48 mi (77 km) to Pensacola.

At the western tip of the peninsula is East Pass (also known as Destin Pass), separating it from Santa Rosa Island to the west. East Pass is Choctawhatchee Bay's only outlet into the Gulf of Mexico. Many sources say the pass was dug by hand, with an inrush of water widening it within hours. The early pass appears (at Destin Harbor's eastern end) in early maps and surveys by Spanish, French, and English surveyors, such as Thomas Jefferys's 1775 map The Coast of West Florida and Louisiana. Frequent dredging is required to keep East Pass navigable.

"Crab Island" was originally two islands made of sand that the U.S. Army Corps of Engineers dredged up from the East Pass. The islands were large enough to support sea grasses, small shrubs, and nesting seabirds. They has been reduced to a sandbar that appears only when the tide is out. It has become a popular anchorage in the area. The entrance to Destin Harbor, a lagoon between the beaches and the main body of the western part of the peninsula, is just north of the East Pass jetty. The lagoon is formed by a sand spit named Holiday Isle; many condominiums have been built along the harbor since the 1970s. Norriego Point protects the harbor and was doubled in size in to protect against coastal erosion.

According to the United States Census Bureau, the city has an area of 8.2 square miles (21 km^{2}), of which 0.6 square miles (1.6 km^{2}) (7.95%) is covered by water.

=== Climate ===
Climate data for Destin, Florida (Destin–Fort Walton Beach Airport), 1991–2020 normals, extremes 1996–present
Month	Jan	Feb	Mar	Apr	May	Jun	Jul	Aug	Sep	Oct	Nov	Dec	Year
Record high °F (°C)	89 (32)	81 (27)	86 (30)	89 (32)	98 (37)	102 (39)	101 (38)	104 (40)	100 (38)	93 (34)	91 (33)	85 (29)	104 (40)
Mean maximum °F (°C)	74.1 (23.4)	74.3 (23.5)	79.6 (26.4)	83.3 (28.5)	91.1 (32.8)	94.5 (34.7)	95.2 (35.1)	95.2 (35.1)	93.5 (34.2)	88.7 (31.5)	81.1 (27.3)	77.2 (25.1)	97.3 (36.3)
Mean daily maximum °F (°C)	63.1 (17.3)	65.8 (18.8)	70.7 (21.5)	76.2 (24.6)	83.5 (28.6)	88.9 (31.6)	90.9 (32.7)	90.6 (32.6)	88.5 (31.4)	80.9 (27.2)	72.1 (22.3)	65.6 (18.7)	78.1 (25.6)
Daily mean °F (°C)	54.2 (12.3)	56.9 (13.8)	62.2 (16.8)	68.1 (20.1)	75.8 (24.3)	81.5 (27.5)	83.6 (28.7)	83.2 (28.4)	80.5 (26.9)	72.1 (22.3)	62.6 (17.0)	56.6 (13.7)	69.8 (21.0)
Mean daily minimum °F (°C)	45.3 (7.4)	47.9 (8.8)	53.6 (12.0)	60.1 (15.6)	68.0 (20.0)	74.1 (23.4)	76.2 (24.6)	75.8 (24.3)	72.4 (22.4)	63.2 (17.3)	53.0 (11.7)	47.5 (8.6)	61.4 (16.3)
Mean minimum °F (°C)	28.6 (−1.9)	33.2 (0.7)	38.8 (3.8)	49.5 (9.7)	57.9 (14.4)	69.3 (20.7)	72.2 (22.3)	72.5 (22.5)	64.5 (18.1)	49.0 (9.4)	38.7 (3.7)	35.0 (1.7)	27.1 (−2.7)
Record low °F (°C)	20 (−7)	22 (−6)	30 (−1)	41 (5)	49 (9)	62 (17)	66 (19)	66 (19)	55 (13)	42 (6)	30 (−1)	22 (−6)	20 (−7)
Average precipitation inches (mm)	4.52 (115)	4.96 (126)	4.70 (119)	4.55 (116)	3.22 (82)	4.70 (119)	5.77 (147)	6.08 (154)	5.18 (132)	2.82 (72)	4.13 (105)	4.72 (120)	55.35 (1,406)
Average precipitation days (≥ 0.01 in)	10.0	9.4	8.7	7.9	6.4	9.7	11.2	12.4	8.2	6.1	8.9	10.6	109.5
Source: NOAA (mean maxima and minima 2006–2020)

=== Environmental issues ===
A 2013 study identified Destin as one of Florida's cities most at risk of inundation. A 2019 report by the Florida Department of Environmental Protection listed sections of the beach as "critically eroded".

Destin received $11 million from the Deepwater Horizon oil spill settlement. It was used to address coastal erosion on Norriego Point, which protects the harbor. Otherwise, the city has not developed a plan to address sea-level rise and coastal erosion.

== Demographics ==
Historical population
Census	Pop.	Note	%±
1990	8,080		—
2000	11,119		37.6%
2010	12,305		10.7%
2020	13,931		13.2%
U.S. Decennial Census

=== Racial and ethnic composition ===
Destin racial composition (Hispanics excluded from racial categories) (NH = Non-Hispanic)
Race	Pop 2010	Pop 2020	% 2010	% 2020
White (NH)	10,645	10,930	86.51%	78.46%
Black or African American (NH)	180	337	1.46%	2.42%
Native American or Alaska Native (NH)	31	46	0.25%	0.33%
Asian (NH)	248	320	2.02%	2.30%
Pacific Islander or Native Hawaiian (NH)	13	10	0.11%	0.07%
Some other race (NH)	81	117	0.66%	0.84%
Two or more races/Multiracial (NH)	311	921	2.53%	6.61%
Hispanic or Latino (any race)	796	1,250	6.47%	8.97%
Total	12,305	13,931		

=== 2020 census ===
As of the 2020 census, Destin had a population of 13,931. The median age was 43.3 years; 17.9% of residents were under 18 and 19.7% were 65 or older. For every 100 females, there were 102.0 males, and for every 100 females 18 and over, there were 101.1 males 18 and over.

All of the residents lived in urban areas, while none lived in rural areas.

Of the 6,111 households in Destin, 24.0% had children under 18 living in them, 48.0% were married-couple households, 21.2% were households with a male householder and no spouse or partner present, and 23.4% were households with a female householder and no spouse or partner present. About 29.4% of all households were made up of individuals, and 10.6% had someone living alone who was 65 or older. There were 3,576 families residing in the city.

The city had 13,726 housing units, of which 55.5% were vacant. The homeowner vacancy rate was 2.9% and the rental vacancy rate was 43.6%.

=== 2010 census ===
As of the 2010 United States census, 12,305 people, 5,148 households, and 3,452 families lived in the city.

=== 2000 census ===
As of the census of 2000, 11,455 people, 4,437 households, and 3,135 families were residing in the city. The population density was 1,477.1 inhabitants per square mile (570.3/km^{2}). The 10,599 housing units had an average density of 1,408.0 per square mile (543.6/km^{2}). The racial makeup of the city was 96.21% White, 0.37% African American, 0.40% Native American, 1.03% Asian, 0.08% Pacific Islander, 0.37% from other races, and 1.54% from two or more races. Hispanics or Latinos of any race were 2.66% of the population.

In 2000, 24.8% of households had children under 18 living with them, 53.0% were married couples living together, 8.0% had a female householder with no husband present, and 35.7% were not families. About 27.4% of all households were made up of individuals, and 8.5% had someone living alone who was 65 or older. The average household size was 2.26, and the average family size was 2.72.

In 2000, the median age was 42 years. For every 100 females, there were 101.8 males. For every 100 females 18 and over, there were 100.4 males.

In 2000, the median income for a household in the city was $53,042 and for a family was $60,498. Males had a median income of $42,218 versus $26,146 for females. The per capita income for the city was $32,048. About 3.0% of families and 5.5% of the population were below the poverty line, including 6.2% of those under 18 and 2.0% of those 65 or over.

== Arts and culture ==
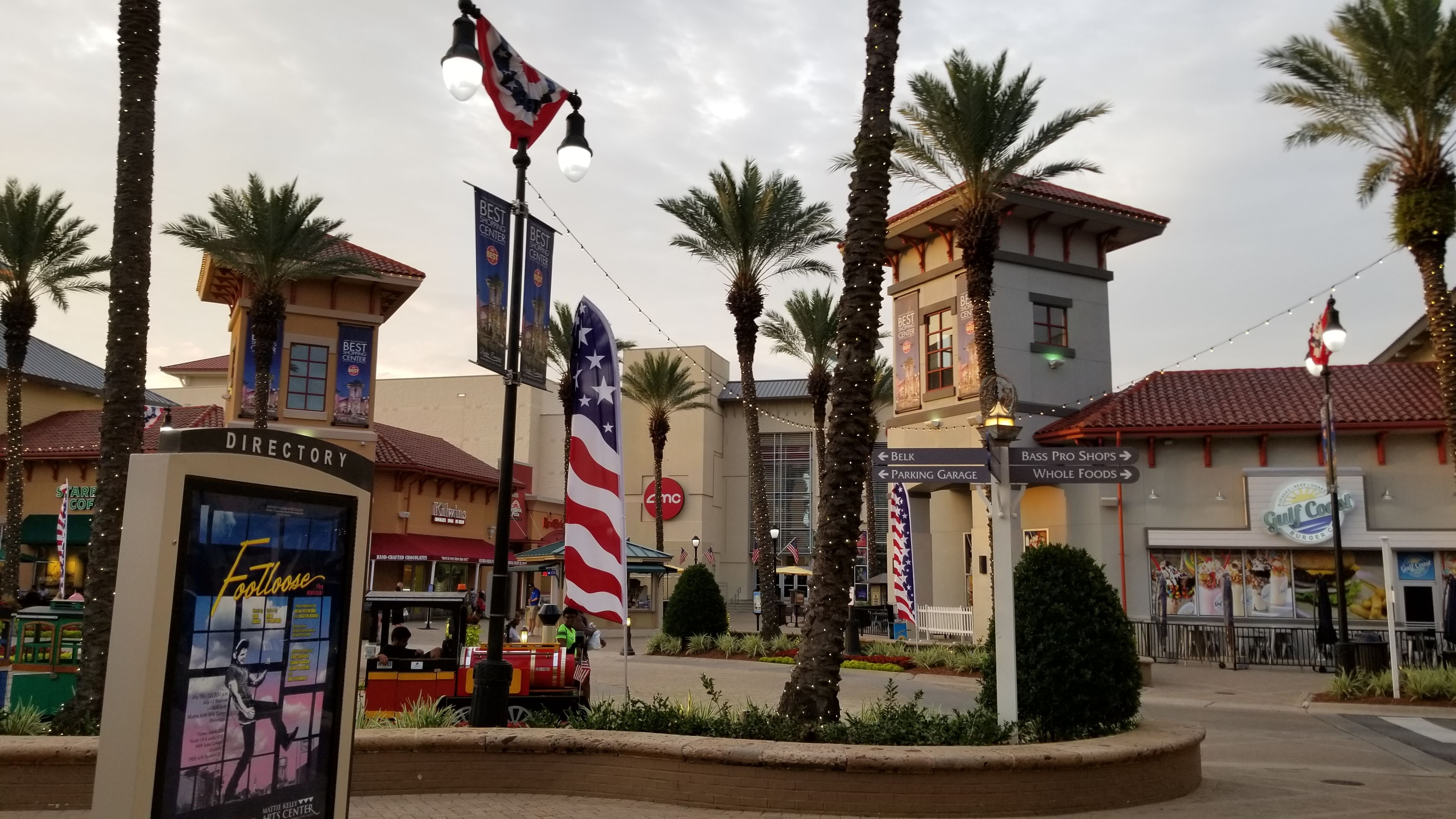
Destin Commons Shopping center

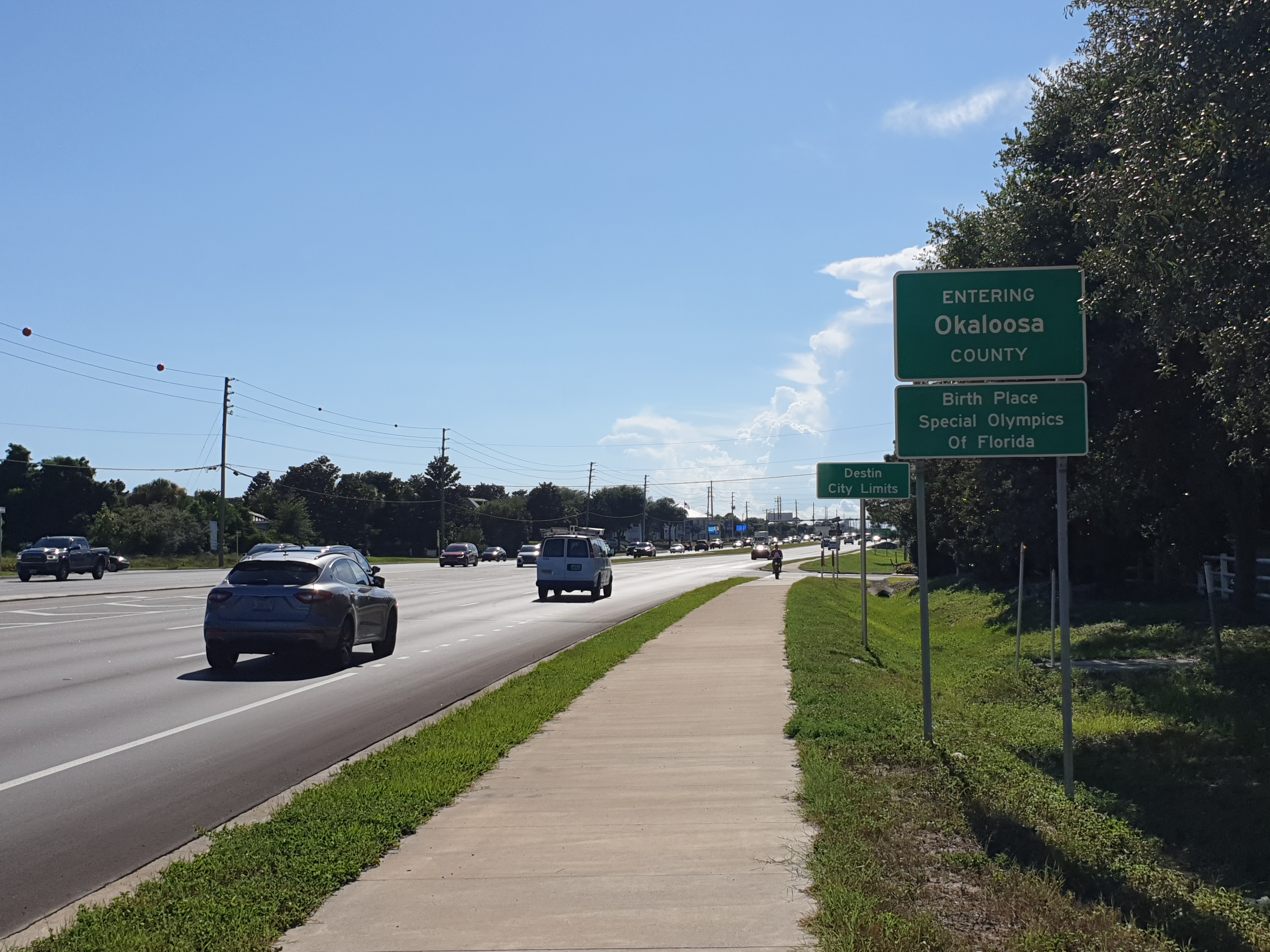
Several road signs at Destin city limits

=== Tourism ===
The white beaches and emerald waters of the Destin area draw many tourists. Florida's Department of Environmental Protection estimates that more than 80% of the Emerald Coast's 4.5 million yearly visitors travel to the region to visit Destin. Visitors can charter fishing vessels from the harbor, and 12 beach access points are in the city. Among the access points is Henderson Beach State Recreation Area. A portion of the Gulf Islands National Seashore, the Okaloosa Day Use Area, is just across East Pass on Santa Rosa Island.

The sand on Destin's beaches is some of the whitest in the world. The sand comes from the Appalachian Mountains, and is made of finely ground quartz crystal, giving the appearance of sugar. Residue flows down the Apalachicola River and is deposited into the Gulf of Mexico. Because of the currents, the sand drifts west along the Gulf Coast and settles from east of Panama City to the Alabama coast.

Several events take place throughout the year as well. For October, the annual Destin Fishing Rodeo draws anglers to Destin each year since 1948. Also, the Destin Seafood Festival is when fresh seafood and local artists meet for one weekend every October.

In addition to an assortment of hotels and motels, many high-rise condominiums are located in Destin. The first condominiums in Destin were built in the 1970s, and construction continues today. Visitors play a large part in Destin's economy – the city's population of around 12,000 increases to 40,000 during the tourist season.

Real estate in Destin is comprised in large part by privately owned vacation rentals, consisting of condominiums, beach homes, townhomes, resorts, studios, cottages, and a few bungalows. Most vacation properties are found on the south side of US Hwy 98 near the Gulf, while most locals live on the northern side of US Hwy 98 by the Choctawhatchee Bay.

Destin's surroundings include other popular tourist destinations. Sandestin, located to the east in Walton County, is a popular golf and beach resort. Further east along the coast are the master-planned community of Seaside, filming location of the 1998 movie The Truman Show; Grayton Beach, Florida; and Rosemary Beach, Florida. To the west are Navarre Beach and Pensacola Beach, and the Civil War fortification Fort Pickens is located at the western end of Santa Rosa Island. Many celebrities own homes in the area.

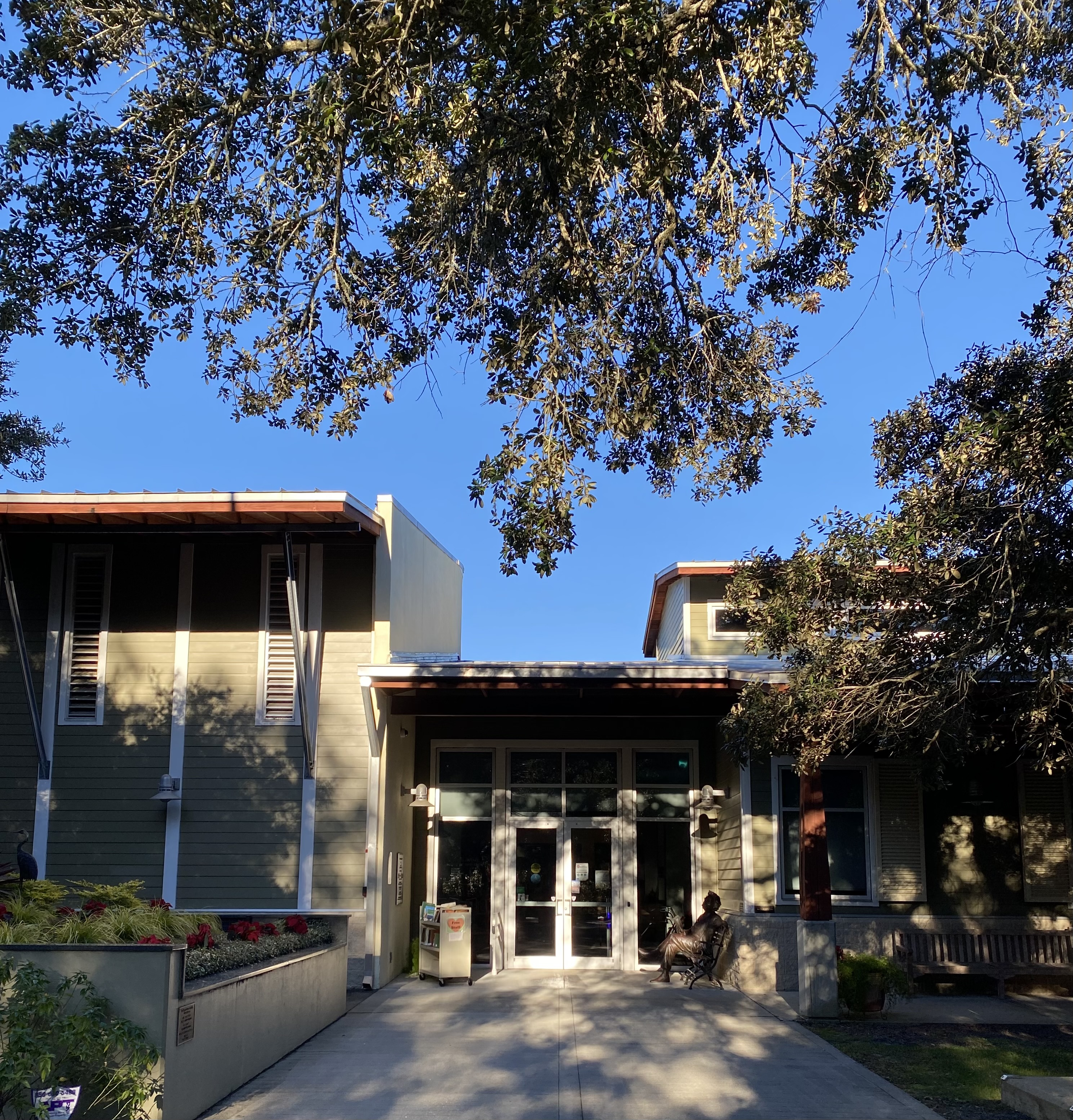
Destin Library

=== Libraries ===
Destin Library was founded in 1940. It is part of the Okaloosa County Public Library Cooperative.

== Government ==
Presidential election results in Destin
Year	Democratic	Republican	Others
2020	25.0% 2,327	73.3% 6,813	1.6% 151
2016	20.2% 1,674	74.8% 6,195	5.0% 417

The city has a council–manager form of government that consists of a mayor, seven-member city council, city clerk, city manager, and a city attorney.

== Education ==
Okaloosa County School District operates public schools, including:

- Destin Elementary School
- Destin Middle School
- Destin High School (which is a public charter school)

== Notable people ==
- Emeril Lagasse, celebrity chef
- Joe A. Rector, artist
