= Turnover (gridiron football) =

Type of loss of possession in gridiron football

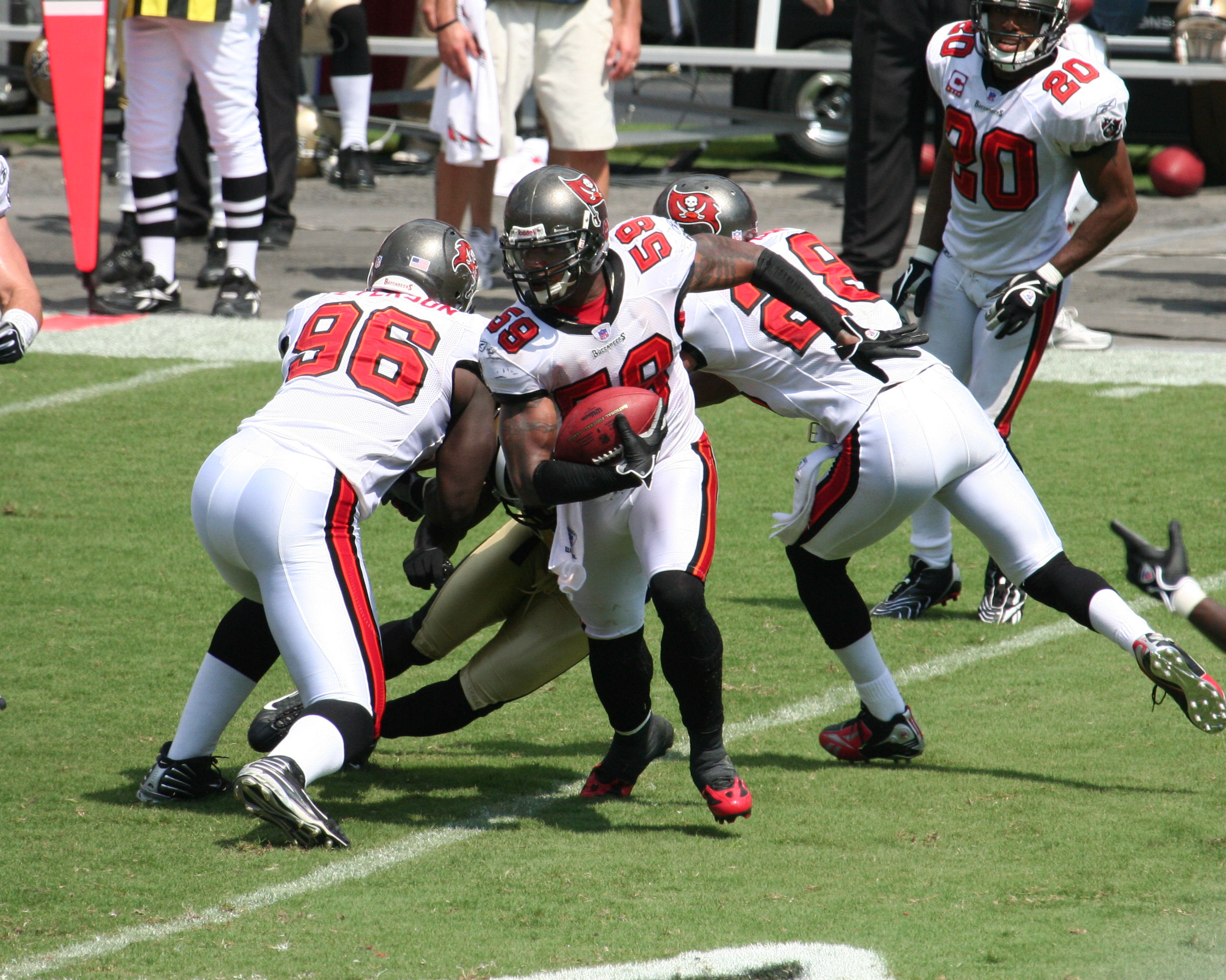
Cato June is shown returning his first regular season interception for the Tampa Bay Buccaneers on September 16, 2007.

In gridiron football, a turnover occurs when the team with the ball loses possession of the ball without kicking or punting it, which is then gained by the other team. In American football, the two events that are officially classified as "turnovers" are fumbles (accidental loss of a live ball after a player has possession) and interceptions (passes intended for a member of the passing team, but caught by a member of the defending team).

In addition, the term "turnover" is often used to refer to a turnover on downs, when a team attempts to gain a first down, touchdown or field goal on a fourth down play (known as a fourth down conversion), but is unsuccessful. When this occurs, the opposing team automatically gains possession at the spot to which the ball was advanced at the end of the play, unless a penalty has occurred (every defensive penalty, if accepted, results either in an automatic first down or a replay of down). In this event, the team that has lost possession is not permitted an opportunity to advance the ball any further.

A play that results in a turnover is rare in gridiron football as only less than 3% of passes in the NFL result in interceptions and less than 1% of run plays in the NFL end in a fumble recovered by the defense. It can have a major effect on the outcome of the game, though, ending an offense's momentum, as it ends their drive without a score and often results in the other team having better field position compared to a punt or a kickoff return following a score. One multiseason analysis of NFL games by Harvard University in 2014 found that teams with a positive turnover differential of one in a game ultimately won 69.6% of the time. Whereas a team with a positive turnover differential of two in a game won 83.7% of the time and a team with a positive turnover differential of three in a game won 90.7% of the time.

== NFL football ==
National Football League game statistics recording turnovers only include lost fumbles and intercepted passes; turnovers on downs are not included (e.g., a team whose only turnovers are turnovers on downs is credited with having "no turnovers").

== Canadian football ==
In Canadian football, turnovers generally occur in a similar manner to American football, except that a turnover on downs will occur after three downs instead of four. In addition, Canadian Football League statistics record turnovers on downs on an equal basis to turnovers caused by fumbles and interceptions.

== In other sports ==
In rugby union a turnover can occur after any tackle, however in rugby league a turnover will only happen after a team is tackled with the ball on the 6th tackle.
