= Enolia McMillan =

First female head of NAACP (1904–2006)

Enolia McMillian
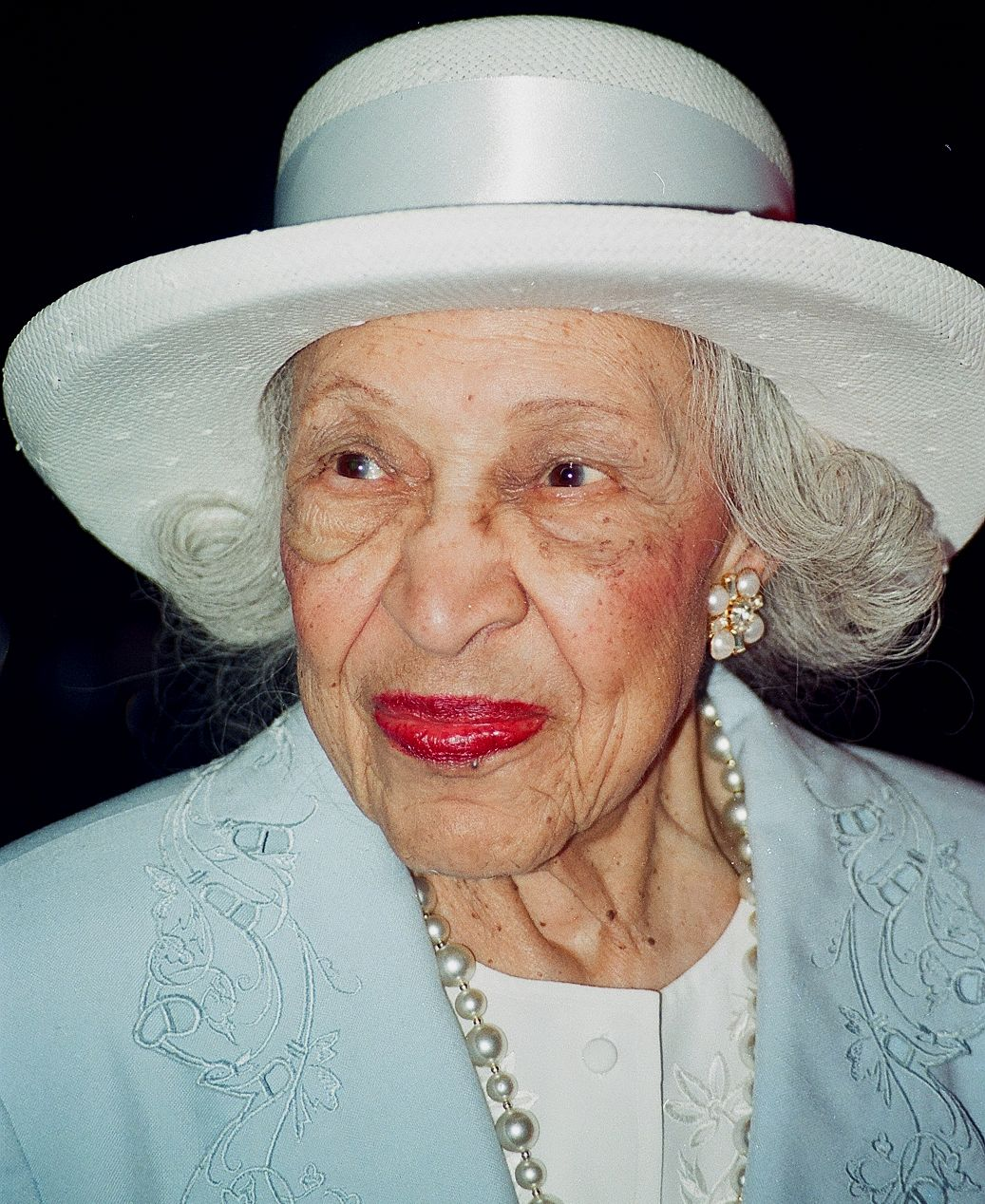

President of the NAACP
- In office 1984–1990
- Preceded by: James Kemp
- Succeeded by: Hazel Dukes

Personal details
- Born: Enolia Virginia Pettigen; October 20, 1904 Willow Grove, Pennsylvania, U.S.
- Died: October 24, 2006 (aged 102) Stevenson, Maryland, U.S.
- Spouse: Betha McMillan (m. 1935; died 1984)
- Children: 1
- Education: Howard University (BA); Columbia University (MEd)

Enolia Pettigen McMillan (October 20, 1904 – October 24, 2006) was an American educator, civil rights activist, and community leader. She was the first female national president of the NAACP.

== Early life ==
Born Enolia Virginia Pettigen in Willow Grove, Pennsylvania, she was the daughter of Elizabeth Fortune Pettigen and John Pettigen, the latter a former slave. When she was eight years old, the family moved to Maryland in search of improved educational opportunities. Enolia Pettigen attended Frederick Douglass High School in Baltimore, Maryland and later Howard University in Washington, D.C., with the help of a scholarship from Alpha Kappa Alpha. She graduated with a Bachelor of Arts in education in 1926.

McMillan earned a master's degree in 1933 from Columbia University. During her masters education, she began to question the Maryland public education system and used the topic for her master's thesis entitled Some Factors Affecting Secondary Education for Negroes in Maryland Counties (Excluding Baltimore). The thesis attacked Maryland's racist segregated school system in the 1930s. She found that the system provided unequal school terms, salary scales and curricula.

== Career ==
McMillan became a teacher in 1927 in Caroline County, Maryland teaching at Denton High School. In 1928, she became a principal in Charles County. She became president of the Maryland State Colored Teachers' Association and regional vice-president of the National Association of Colored Teachers. After the 1954 Brown v. Board of Education ruling outlawing segregated public schools, she was one of the first black teachers at a white school.

She retired from teaching in 1968. In 1969, she defeated Juanita Mitchell to become president of the Baltimore branch of the NAACP. During her presidency, the National Office was threatened with bankruptcy in 1976 due to legal proceedings against it in connection with a 1966 boycott of white merchants in Port Gibson, Mississippi. She launched a fundraising drive to help defray expenses, and her efforts resulted in the Baltimore branch raising the largest local contribution of $150,000.

In 1984, she became the first woman to be elected national president of the NAACP, and she held the position until 1990. The role at the time was largely ceremonial, but McMillan had considerable influence on the organization's policies and operations. Along with former NAACP Executive Director Benjamin Hooks, she is credited with organizing the organization's move from New York to Baltimore in 1986.

McMilllan was an outspoken critic of the Reagan Administration, which she felt harmed the NAACP's advocacy efforts in housing, education, employment and business. During her tenure, she also helped black businesses to receive federal contracts, and, in 1985, led a protest in Washington against South Africa's apartheid system.

In 1941, she was photographed among delegates at the first state convention of the Maryland NAACP. In 1975, she was named the first female chair of the board of regents at Morgan State University.

== Personal life ==
On December 26, 1935, Enolia Pettigen married Betha D. McMillan. They had a son, Betha McMillan Jr., in 1940. She died October 24, 2006, in Stevenson, Maryland from heart failure just four days after celebrating her 102nd birthday. She is buried at King Memorial Park in Baltimore.

== Awards and honors ==
- She was inducted into the Maryland Women's Hall of Fame in 1990.
- She was awarded an Honorary Degree in Public Service from The University of Maryland, Baltimore County in 1991.
- In 2000, the street near the NAACP's Baltimore branch was renamed Enolia P. McMillan Way.

== Sources ==
- Frances N. Beckles. "Enolia Pettigen McMillan" in 20 Black Women: A Profile of Contemporary Black Maryland Women. Baltimore, MD: Gateway Press, 1978. OCLC 3869066 pp. 92–99
- Adam Bernstein. "Enolia McMillan; First Woman to Lead NAACP". The Washington Post, October 26, 2006 p. B7
- "Enolia Pettigen McMillan" in Notable Black American Women, Gale Research, 1992. ISBN 978-0-7876-6494-7
- Nicole Fuller and Kelly Brewington. "'Matriarch of NAACP' dies at 102". The Baltimore Sun, October 25, 2006 p. 1A, 9A
- Carolyn B. Stegman. "Enolia Pettigen McMillan" in Women of Achievement in Maryland History. Forestville, MD, 2002. p. 37-38.
