= Cato June =

American football player and coach (born 1979)

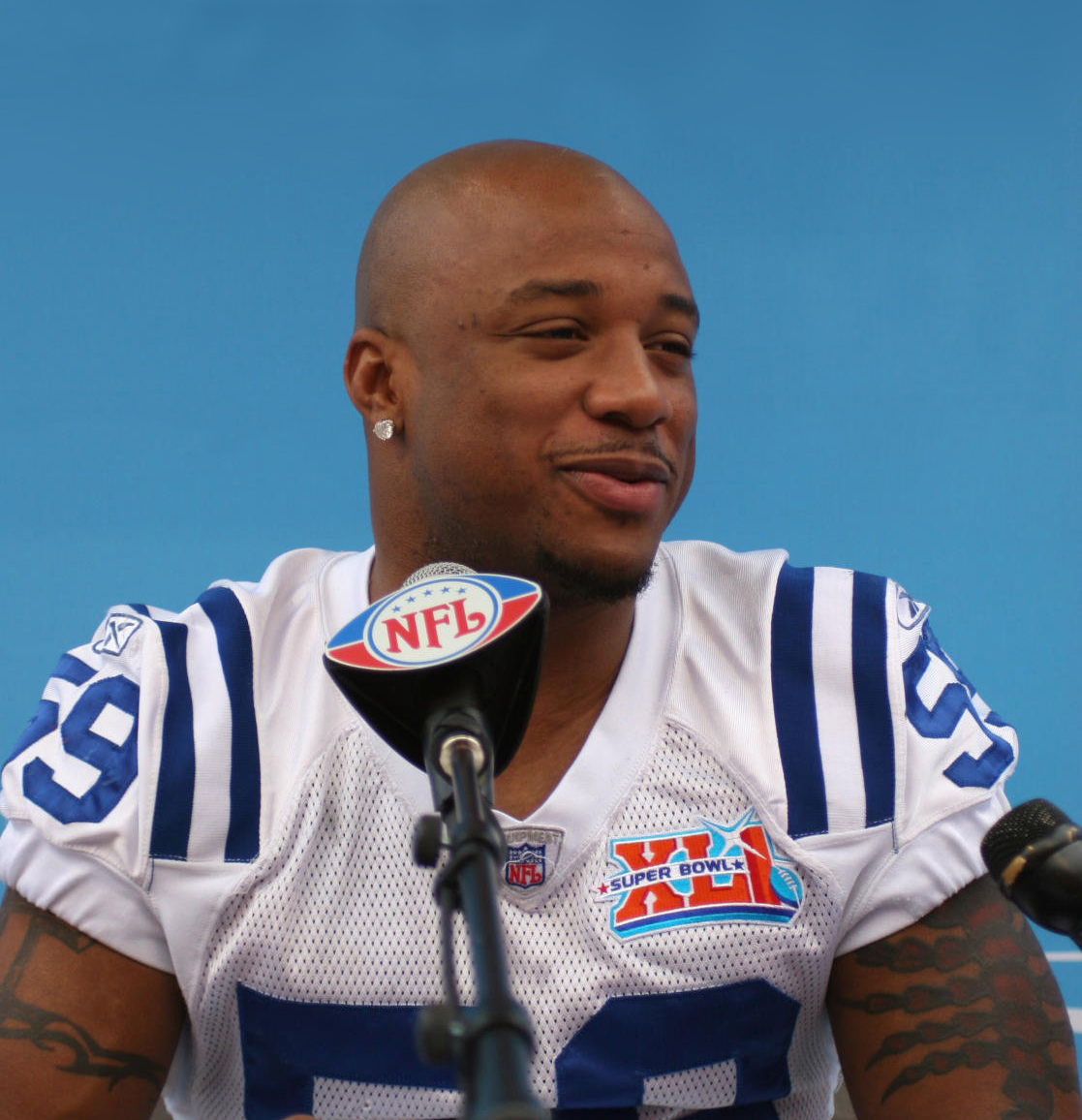
- June in 2007

Indianapolis Colts
- Title: Assistant linebackers coach

Personal information
- Born: November 18, 1979 (age 47); Riverside, California, U.S.
- Listed height: 6 ft 0 in (1.83 m)
- Listed weight: 229 lb (104 kg)

Career information
- Position: Linebacker (No. 59)
- High school: Anacostia (Washington, D.C.)
- College: Michigan
- NFL draft: 2003: 6th round, 198th overall pick

Career history

Playing
- Indianapolis Colts (2003–2006); Tampa Bay Buccaneers (2007–2008); Houston Texans (2009)*; Chicago Bears (2009); Omaha Nighthawks (2010)
- * Offseason or practice squad member only

Coaching
- Anacostia HS (2011) Defensive coordinator; Anacostia HS (2012–2014) Head coach; Charles Herbert Flowers HS (2015) Head coach; Howard (2016) Running backs coach; Howard (2017–2018) Safeties coach; Howard (2019) Linebackers coach; UMass (2020) Outside linebackers coach; Bowling Green (2021) Outside linebackers coach; Indianapolis Colts (2022–present) Assistant linebackers coach

Awards and highlights
- Super Bowl champion (XLI); Second-team All-Pro (2005); Pro Bowl (2005)

Career NFL statistics
- Total tackles: 499
- Sacks: 1.0
- Forced fumbles: 3
- Fumble recoveries: 3
- Interceptions: 12
- Defensive touchdowns: 2
- Stats at Pro Football Reference

Cato Nnamdi June (born November 18, 1979) is an American football coach and former player who is an assistant linebackers coach for the Indianapolis Colts of the National Football League (NFL). He played as a linebacker in the NFL after being selected by the Colts in the sixth round of the 2003 NFL draft. A 2006 Pro Bowl choice, June was a member of the Super Bowl XLI champion Colts. During the Super Bowl championship season, June was the Colts' leading tackler. In addition to his tenure with the Colts, he played in the NFL for the Tampa Bay Buccaneers. Before becoming a professional, he played college football for the Michigan Wolverines and was an outstanding athlete in high school football, basketball, track and field and baseball at Anacostia High School in Washington, D.C. As a senior, he was widely regarded to be the best high school football player in the District of Columbia.

He led Anacostia to the District of Columbia Interscholastic Athletic Association (DCIAA) football championship title as a sophomore and in two subsequent championship games. He was city champion in the triple jump as a junior. As a senior, he earned all-league recognition in basketball and earned numerous honors in football, including District of Columbia Player of the year awards from Gatorade, USA Today and The Washington Post as well as a Parade All-American. He was also co-class president, salutatorian and a member of the National Honor Society.

He was widely recruited for his all-around abilities as an athlete, scholar and leader. He attracted dozens of scholarship offers but chose the University of Michigan. He was a member of the defending national champions' recruiting class, which was considered to be the best in the country. He became a starter towards the end of his redshirt freshman year, but missed the entire next season due to injury. He returned as a fourth-year junior starter. He continued starting as a safety until an injury slowed him down late in his fifth-year senior season. Despite senior season injuries, he was named as an honorable mention All-Big Ten Conference player and was chosen to play in the Senior Bowl.

June spent a year on special teams before becoming a starter during the 2004 NFL season. During the 2005 NFL season, he began the year with a record-setting rate of interceptions for a linebacker to help his team start out 13–0 and head to the 2005–06 NFL playoffs. He was a Pro Bowler that year and finished seventh in the NFL in tackles the next as the Colts won Super Bowl XLI. After four seasons with the Colts, he signed with the Buccaneers where he became the first person to displace 11-time Pro Bowler Derrick Brooks from the lineup. After two seasons with the Buccaneers, he signed with the Houston Texans but broke his forearm during 2009 training camp and was released before the regular season. He signed with the Bears in the middle of the season only to be released after 2 weeks. Since retiring from the NFL, he has become a football coach at his high school alma mater.

== Early life ==
June was raised in the Great Plains of Oklahoma. As a high school freshman, June attended Muskogee High School in Muskogee, Oklahoma, where he was a veritable "Okie from Muskogee". According to The Washington Post, he envisioned himself eventually playing football for either Oklahoma or Oklahoma State. His high school football team had a large following with regular attendance of 8,000. When June was a sophomore, he and Marjani Dele, his mother, moved to the northwest section of Washington, D.C., in 1995. Following the move, she enrolled him in a summer college prep program, where he met Troy Stewart, son of Anacostia head coach Willie Stewart. Troy, an assistant coach at Anacostia, and his father recruited June to Anacostia High School. That season, he played cornerback, wide receiver, and kickoff returner. On Thanksgiving Day, Anacostia won the DCIAA championship game, known as the Turkey Bowl, by a 40–31 score over Dunbar High School. In the game, June intercepted a pass late in the first half and returned it 92 yards for a touchdown to enable his team to take an 8–7 lead. That season, he earned a selection to The Washington Post's 1995 All-Met Football team as a defensive back. The following spring, he played shortstop and pitcher for the school baseball team.

Prior to winning the city championship, Anacostia had played football on a barren field that was described by The Washington Post as "rugged prairie known by players across the city as the 'dust bowl'". In 1996, Mayor of Washington, D.C., Marion Barry, helped the team acquire new topsoil and 500 rolls of Brute Bermuda sod worth about $60,000 ($123,170 today). As a junior, June, who wore #1, rushed for 90 yards and scored two touchdowns in the DCIAA semi-final game. In the championship game, June fumbled on the 1-yard line in the fourth quarter, leaving the door open for Cardozo Senior High School to score a touchdown in the waning seconds to secure a victory. During his junior year, he was part of the basketball team that successfully defended the Washington D.C. city high school basketball championship.

As a senior, he was a preseason USA Today honorable mention All-American and preseason SuperPrep All-American as a 6-foot-1-inch (1.85 m), 190-pound (86 kg) defensive back. During the season, the football team would deal with the adversity of a D.C. school crisis, the slaying of a player and the death of an assistant coach. That season, he switched from defensive back to linebacker at times. By mid-season, he was being mentioned across the country as the nation's best player. As a senior, he rushed for 121 yards and scored two touchdowns in the DCIAA semi-final game. Prior to the championship game, no one had caught a touchdown against him and he had not fumbled the football. During the championship game, June scored the touchdown that gave Anacostia its only lead at 8–6. However, Howard D. Woodson High School and senior quarterback Byron Leftwich avenged its only regular season loss (which came 28–20 at the hands of Anacostia) by a 26–22 margin.

At the end of the season, he was a 1997 All-Met selection by The Washington Post and described as both the top DCIAA defensive back and as a running back who scored 18 two-point conversions and returned three kickoffs for touchdowns. He was selected as The Washington Post All-Met Defensive Player of the Year and USA Today District of Columbia Player of the Year and Second-team All-USA. During the season, he did not yield a touchdown all season and collecting five interceptions (two for touchdowns), 84 solo tackles, 39 assists in addition to his offensive statistics, which included 889 yards and 12 touchdowns. He was named the only Parade All-American from Metropolitan Washington, and he was selected as a Gatorade player of the year for the District of Columbia. June was also honored by The Pigskin Club of Washington, D.C. June played under coach Willie Stewart who coached Anacostia to seven consecutive appearances in the DCIAA championship game, including three in which June participated and the 1995 victory in which June was MVP.

As a senior, he was a member of the National Honor Society, co-class president and a candidate to be valedictorian with a 3.8 grade point average. In addition to football, he played on the baseball, basketball and track and field teams. In track, he ran the 100 meters in 10.5 seconds and 200 meters in 21.6 seconds. He was city champion in the triple jump as a junior. He was a starting small forward on the three-time DCIAA championship basketball team. He received second-team All-conference honors his senior year. By the eve of the DCIAA Championship game held on Thanksgiving Day (November 27, 1997), he had 35 scholarship offers. Before his senior season his dream school for its combination of athletics and academics was the University of North Carolina. He was recruited by top football programs such as Syracuse, and Miami and his early list of top five programs was Michigan, Ohio State, Florida, North Carolina and Penn State. Later, he replaced Penn State with Miami on his five school visitation list. He visited Ohio State in mid-December as they prepared for the 1998 Sugar Bowl. He visited Florida in mid-January 1998. June's final decision was a choice between Florida and Michigan and he chose Michigan on January 13, 1998, although there were reports that he had signed with Notre Dame.

He was part of the nation's number one recruiting class for the undefeated defending national champion Wolverines. The team recruited numerous top 50-rated players on both offense: Justin Fargas, Marquise Walker, David Terrell and Drew Henson, and defense: Victor Hobson, Dave Armstrong, June, Bennie Joppru, and Larry Foote. The All-Met Offensive Player of the Year, Walter Cross, was also a member of this recruiting class. The class included a total of six Parade All-Americans: Fargas, Henson, Walker, Terrell, June and Hayden Epstein. Before matriculating to Michigan he participated in the July 1998 D.C. Coaches Association All-Star game as well as the Baltimore-Washington Beltway Classic. As a high schooler with aspirations of making a mark in the NFL and who kept a Deion Sanders poster in his bedroom, he left his mark by writing "Big Time 1" on things whenever the opportunity arose. June graduated as salutatorian.

== College career ==
June played college football at the University of Michigan, where he switched from cornerback to play safety and wear the #2 jersey that had previously been worn by 1997 Heisman Trophy winner, Charles Woodson. As a defensive back at Michigan, June's head coach, Lloyd Carr, was the former coach for the position. He redshirted as a freshman during the 1998 season for the 1998 Wolverines. During his 1999 season as a redshirt freshmen for the 1999 Wolverines, he intercepted a pass in his second game, which he returned for 29 yards to the 16-yard line. That season, he played all twelve games and started the final four games at free safety. As the season progressed, he became involved in several big plays. He recovered a fumble on October 23 against Illinois. In the following game against Indiana on October 30, he blocked a punt and recovered the football, which led to a touchdown on the following play. He earned his first start on November 6 against Northwestern and sacked the quarterback to take the Wildcats out of field goal range. On November 13 against Penn State, he forced a fumble near midfield, which led to a Michigan scoring drive. Although he had earned a starting position, his pass defense coverage had not yet earned respect. In his best performance of the season, before a record-setting crowd of 111,575 at Michigan Stadium, he recorded a team-high 10 (7 solo) of his 27 tackles in a 24–17 victory in the rivalry game against Ohio State on November 20, 1999. June also recovered a fumble to set up a scoring drive for the final Michigan touchdown. The season ended in an overtime victory against Alabama in the 2000 Orange Bowl.

During the summer before his 2000 season as a redshirt sophomore for the 2000 Wolverines when he was expected to challenge for the starting strong safety position, he suffered a season-ending anterior cruciate ligament injury in his right knee that required reconstructive surgery. He spent the season in rehabilitation with two other teammates who had knee injuries and was unable to run for six months. His absence at the safety position caused Fargas to switch from running back to safety that season. Before returning to football, he was involved in a public altercation in spring 2001. During the altercation, a Michigan teammate was identified as having punched someone in the face, and June was charged with failing to obey an officer's order for refusing to leave the scene.

The 2001 Michigan Wolverines football team lost several key offensive components from the previous season when Anthony Thomas and David Terrell joined the Chicago Bears of the NFL and Drew Henson was drafted by the New York Yankees of Major League Baseball. The 2001 team lost a total of nine starters for the 2001 season but returned eight defensive starters, and June was a welcome addition to a lineup. In the second game of the season, June was called for a questionable roughing the passer penalty against Washington that allowed the Huskies to score a field goal to reduce the Wolverines' lead to 23–12 in the fourth quarter. A few weeks later, he had a career-high two sacks in a 45–20 victory against Illinois on September 29. The following week, on October 6, he had an interception in a shutout of Penn State. June had been starting at free safety, but the Penn State game marked his first start at strong safety because of an injury to Julius Curry. On October 13, he led the team in tackles with seven, including a sack, against Purdue in a game that left the team as the only Big Ten team with an undefeated conference record. In the next game, his fourth quarter interception led to a comeback victory against Iowa to stay unbeaten in conference. In the following game on November 3 against Michigan State, Michigan's conference record fell to 4–1 as June left the game with another injury to his right knee. June started all but one game and finished the season fourth on the team in tackles.

In his senior season for the 2002 Wolverines, one of June's notable performances was his individual effort to stop a bootleg play against Notre Dame on September 14, which forced a change of possession to give Michigan the ball with just over two minutes remaining. On September 28 against Illinois, he had a sack and made a notable lead block on the interception return of a fellow defensive back. In the October 12 victory over Penn State, he made a key defensive play that almost resulted in an interception as part of an overtime goal line stand to hold Penn State to a field goal. In the 23–21 victory over Purdue on October 19, he recovered the final onside kick by Purdue. A collision on October 26 in a game with Iowa halted play for ten minutes while June received medical attention after leaving the game on a stretcher. At the time, he had movement in his extremities. He was hospitalized after the incident, but was released from the hospital the following morning. June was sidelined for the Michigan – Michigan State Paul Bunyan Trophy game against Michigan State on November 2, but participated in two plays during the subsequent Michigan–Minnesota Little Brown Jug game against Minnesota on November 9. June was healthy in time for the 2003 Outback Bowl against Florida, where he recorded a season-high nine tackles. Over the course of the season, June had 36 tackles, 17 assists, four tackles for loss, and two sacks. He had 102 career tackles and 36 career assists, 10 tackles for loss, and six sacks.

June was selected as an honorable mention All-Big Ten performer by both the coaches and the media, despite his late season injury. He was also selected to play in the 2003 Senior Bowl along with Hobson, B.J. Askew, and Joppru. At the 2003 NFL Scouting Combine, June ran the slowest 40-yard dash (4.68 seconds) of all the free safeties. June was one of six Wolverines drafted in the 2003 NFL draft and the first Michigan safety drafted since Corwin Brown in the 1993 NFL draft.

== Professional career ==
Pre-draft measurables
| Height | Weight | Arm length | Hand span | 40-yard dash | 10-yard split | 20-yard split | Vertical jump | Broad jump |
|---|---|---|---|---|---|---|---|---|
| 6 ft 0 1/8 in (1.83 m) | 218 lb (99 kg) | 31 in (0.79 m) | 9 1/4 in (0.23 m) | 4.60 s | 1.63 s | 2.70 s | 35.0 in (0.89 m) | 9 ft 5 in (2.87 m) |
All values from NFL Combine

=== Indianapolis Colts ===
On April 27, June was selected by the Indianapolis Colts in the sixth round (25th pick) of the 2003 NFL draft with the expectation that he would play weak side linebacker. Colts coach Tony Dungy had had previous success converting college safeties into linebackers. Colts President Bill Polian made the decision to draft him and have him converted. June agreed to a three-year contract on July 23 with the Colts just before the voluntary rookie camp in advance of the full training camp. During the 2003 NFL season, June was one of only two 2003 Colts draft choices not to make a significant contribution. He sat out the first five games and played mostly on special teams the rest of the season. Nonetheless, June, who wore #59 for the Colts, was on the roster for the 2003–04 NFL playoffs.

After losing to the New England Patriots in the American Football Conference Championship Game and losing Marcus Washington who joined the Washington Redskins, the Colts shuffled their linebacker lineup and June was listed as a starter when the Colts arrived at mini-camp. At the 2004 Colts training camp, June competed with Keyon Whiteside for the starting weakside linebacker position. By the end of training camp, June was the starter, and 2004 rookie Gilbert Gardner was the backup. June made his debut as a starter in the opening game against the 2004 Super Bowl champion New England Patriots. That season, the Colts used a 4-3 defense with a fourth linebacker on passing downs. In week 5, June had a team-high ten tackles and his first interception in a 35–14 victory over the Oakland Raiders. In week 15, June returned an interception 71 yards to the four-yard-line where he stepped out of bounds with 59 seconds remaining in the game at the RCA Dome, the Colts' home stadium. This prompted the fans to chant for Peyton Manning to enter the game to attempt to tie Dan Marino's single-season touchdown pass record. Since the Colts led the game 20–10 and had clinched the AFC South division, Manning took a knee instead. Coach Dungy's scheme is designed so that the weakside linebacker is supposed to make the most tackles, and June was the Colts' leading tackler by a wide margin that season. June started every game that season.

June's 2004 season had been described as average, and he was considered likely to lose his starting assignment in a battle with Gardner and Kendyll Pope in 2005. Pope was suspended for the season for violating the league's substance abuse policy. June beat Gardner for the starting position, although some speculate that he won the job due to Gardner's injury at the end of training camp. June recorded an interception that he ran back for a touchdown in the first game of the season against the Baltimore Ravens on Sunday Night Football. On October 9, he recorded two interceptions and ran back one for a touchdown to help Indianapolis reach a 5–0 record with a 28–3 victory over the San Francisco 49ers. The following week on Monday Night Football, June recorded two more interceptions, one of which changed the momentum of the game because quarterback Marc Bulger was injured trying to chase June. Both interceptions led to touchdowns as the Colts beat the St. Louis Rams 17–0. After six games, June was the NFL leader in interceptions, but he was diagnosed with a sports hernia. June's fast start prompted talk of him breaking the all-time NFL linebacker single-season interception record of eight and being the first linebacker to lead the league since 1959. In a game that was considered a bad performance by the Colts despite its victorious result, June had a season-high fourteen tackles to help the Colts raise their record to 9–0 in a 31–17 victory over the Houston Texans. June sat out the December 11 game against the Jacksonville Jaguars, which resulted in the Colts raising their record to 13–0, clinching their third straight AFC South title, a first-round bye and home-field advantage throughout the playoffs. There was great speculation about whether June and other injured players would rest up for the 2005–06 NFL playoffs or whether the team would attempt to post the first perfect 16–0 regular season. June was able to play, but the Colts lost their next game on December 18 to fall to 13–1. After being named to the 2006 Pro Bowl during the following week, June was listed as inactive for the 15th game of the season and did not travel with the team to Seattle. He also sat out the final game of the season. After the conclusion of the regular season, June was selected as a first time Pro Bowl starter at linebacker. In the opening round of the playoffs, the Colts forced a fumble by Jerome Bettis that was nearly run back for a winning touchdown in the final minute of play, but Ben Roethlisberger made a game-saving tackle on Nick Harper for the Pittsburgh Steelers's 21–18 victory. Gary Brackett forced the fumble, although at least one source credited June with the tackle. June also had an interception and four solo tackles in the loss. June was named second-team All-Pro at outside linebacker. Despite missing three games due to injury, June finished third on the team with 109 tackles and led the team with 5 interceptions. He was also the team's nominee for the Ed Block Courage Award in 2005.

June had two surgeries to repair his hernia in February 2006. He would have become an unrestricted free agent on March 3, 2006, but the Colts made him a $1.55 million tender offer on March 2. On April 24, June signed a $1.57 million one-year contract despite his interest in a long-term deal. June was arrested on June 13 for failing to appear in court on a driving while suspended charge in Boone County, Indiana. The arrest was described as the result of a miscommunication. When the 2006 Colts started training camp, June's health caused the team to limit him to one practice session per day. June was sidelined during the final preseason game. In week 5 of the season, June recorded 9 tackles as the Colts improved to 5–0 prior to their bye week, and he followed it up with 15 tackles as they moved to 6–0. June forced a fumble in the seventh game, and he intercepted two Tom Brady passes as the team improved to 8–0 in a 27–20 road victory over the New England Patriots. June led the team with nine tackles as they moved to 9–0. Although June accepted responsibility for missed tackles after the team fell to 10–3, he was ranked fifth in the NFL in tackles made. June recorded an interception as the 12–4 Colts finished the regular season with a 27–22 victory over the Miami Dolphins, and he finished the season ranked seventh in the NFL and first on the team in tackles made. During the 2006–07 NFL playoffs, he helped the Colts win Super Bowl XLI. June started every game for the Colts during the season and the playoffs. When the free agent signing period began on March 2, June and several unrestricted free agents were left unsigned.

=== Tampa Bay Buccaneers ===
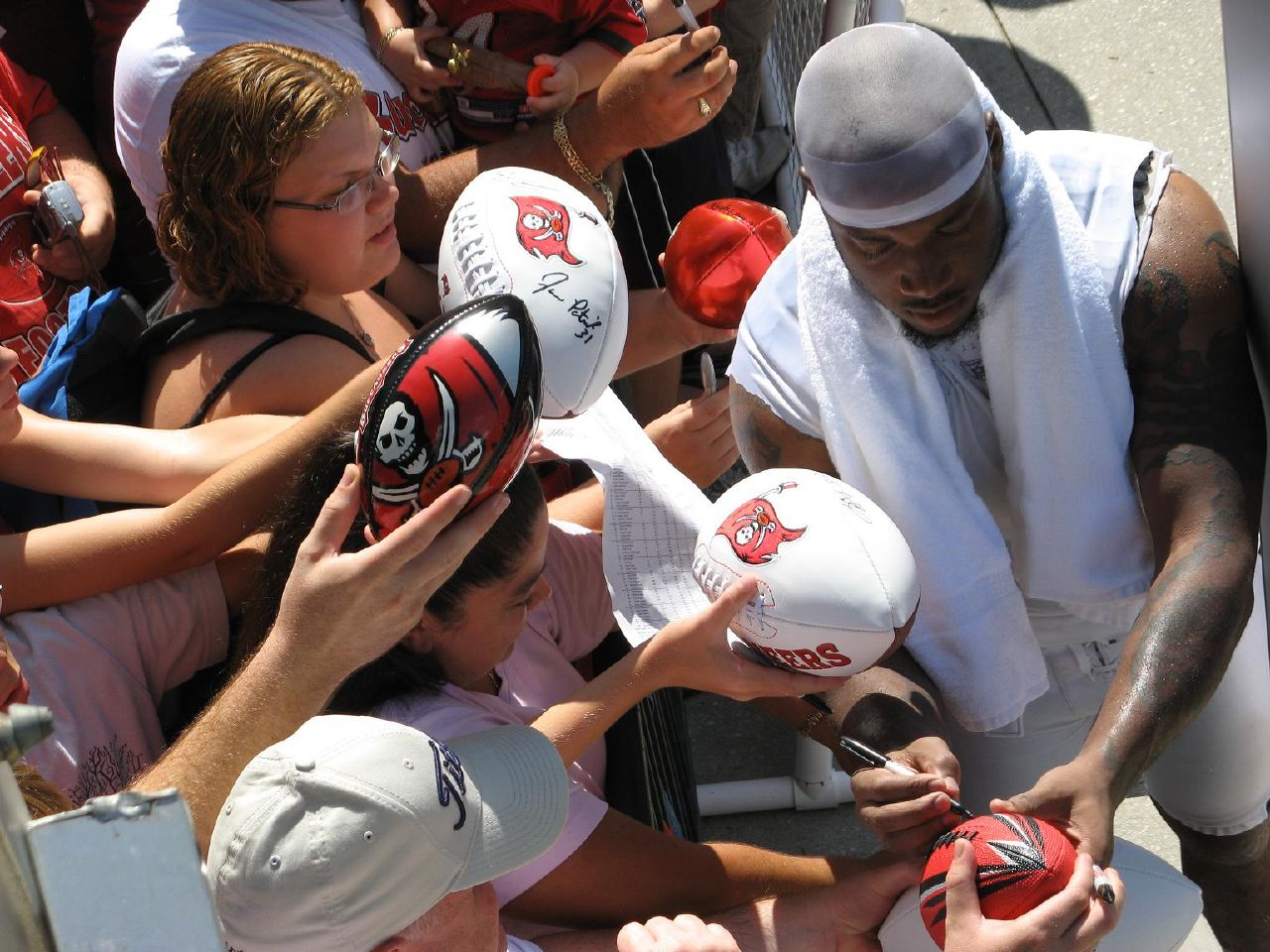
June signs autographs at Tampa Bay Buccaneers 2007 training camp.

June was considered to be a fast linebacker and a specialized talent with a better likelihood of success in a defensive scheme that was built around speed rather than size. On March 17, 2007, he signed with the Tampa Bay Buccaneers, who used the defensive scheme designed by Dungy. The New York Giants and Colts were also interested in signing June. The contract was believed to be a three-year, $12 million agreement, but some later reports claim it was a four-year, $17 million contract.

In Tampa, June joined a defense that had been among the top 10 in the league for a decade until the 2006 Buccaneers faltered with a 4–12 record. In 2006, they fell from 1st to 17th in team defense. When June arrived it was fairly clear that Derrick Brooks would not be changing from his weakside linebacker position and that June would be moving to strongside linebacker. When he became a Buccaneer, he stood out for his dedication and enthusiasm. For example, when the Colts had their Super Bowl ring ceremony, June flew to Indianapolis and back without missing any Buccaneers practice time. As strongside linebacker he beat out Ryan Nece as the 2007 Buccaneers starter, although he was considered the heir apparent to 13-year veteran and 10-time Pro Bowler Brooks at the weakside position. June again wore the #59 as a Buccaneer. Because of his weakside linebacker and safety experience, June was expected to remain in the game during passing situations unlike most strongside linebackers. June also expected defenses to run at him because at 6 feet (1.8 m), 227 pounds (103 kg) he was small for an NFL strongside linebacker and one of the smallest linebackers in the NFL.

June recorded an interception and touchdown return in the Buccaneers' third preseason game against the Miami Dolphins. In his first game as a Buccaneer, he did not play on many passing downs, which caused something of a controversy in the press after the opening 20–6 loss to the Seattle Seahawks. In the second game, on some passing downs June played in place of Brooks, who had never sat on the sidelines previously. Brooks, whose speed may have been slowed by father time, avoided the media after the game, but June and other teammates defended him. The press was much more amenable to having June play more and claimed that the defense was back up to its prior level of excellence with the change. Over the course of the 2007 season June and Brooks divided time at linebacker during nickel defense coverage.

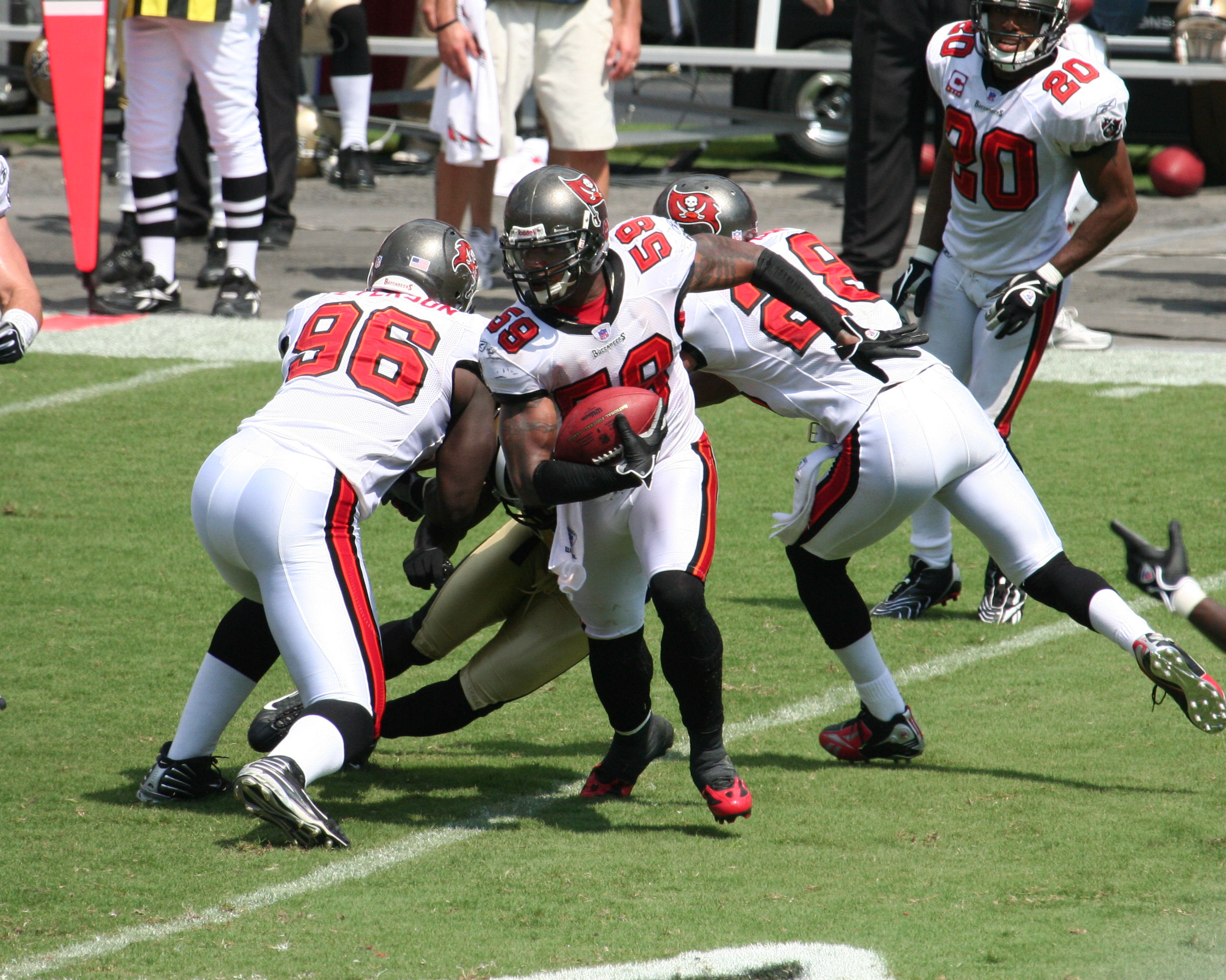
June's first regular season interception for the Tampa Bay Buccaneers came on September 16, 2007.

June made his first interception during his second game as a Buccaneer. It led to a touchdown scoring drive during a 31–14 victory against the New Orleans Saints. In his third game, June made a key tackle for a 3-yard loss, which resulted in a subsequent missed field goal by the St. Louis Rams. After the fourth week the Bucs were 3–1 with the NFL's fifth-rated defense and June was the team's third-leading tackler as they headed into a week five showdown against June's previous team, the 4–0 Indianapolis Colts. The Colts gained 400 yards on June and the Buccaneers in a 33–14 defeat on October 7. After the sixth week the Bucs were 4–2 and June was eighth in the NFL and second on his team in assists. After June had a team-high nine tackles and a forced fumble to lead them to a 6–4 record with a 31–7 victory over the Atlanta Falcons, he was arrested for driving under the influence (DUI) in Hillsborough County, Florida, which had the most DUI cases of any county in Florida. June was one of several Bucs to be charged with DUI that season, and charges were eventually dropped. In the Atlanta game, which gave the Bucs an undefeated 3–0 division record, June was involved in a controversial fumble–lateral play, which NFL officials said the referees ruled incorrectly on. Subsequently, the Bucs raised their record to 9–5 and clinched the NFC South Division. June and other star players were rested for large parts of the final two games, which the Bucs lost. Nonetheless, June was still injured in the final game of the season, and he was listed as inactive for the Bucs' 2007–08 NFL playoffs matchup with the New York Giants, which the team lost. June finished his first season with the Bucs with 69 tackles and one interception. June was part of a defense that finished the season ranked second in the league.

June had offseason foot surgery in February 2008. During the opening game of the season, Brooks suffered a hamstring injury and removed himself from the game in the third quarter, which fueled speculation during the following week that he would miss the first start of his fourteen-year career and that June would start on the weakside. Brooks, however, made his 194th-consecutive start the following week. In a story not published until four weeks later, Minnesota Vikings running back Adrian Peterson claims that June attempted to injure him in a November 16 game. June made his first interception of the season and second as a Buccaneer on a Drew Brees pass that was tipped by Ronde Barber in the twelfth game of the season as Tampa earned its fourth consecutive victory to improve its record to 9–3 on November 30 against the New Orleans Saints. After the Buccaneers lost their final four games to miss the playoffs, the Buccaneers replaced Jon Gruden and Bruce Allen with Raheem Morris and Mark Dominik as head coach and general manager. The team subsequently released five veteran players in a move that was said to be unrelated to the salary cap. June was released by the Buccaneers on February 25, 2009, along with Derrick Brooks, Ike Hilliard, Warrick Dunn and Joey Galloway. The transaction avoided a $2 million roster bonus for June.

=== Houston Texans ===
June was signed by the Houston Texans on April 4, 2009, to a one-year contract worth $1.5 million. He was expected to compete with Xavier Adibi and Zac Diles for the weakside linebacker position. However, on August 20, June broke his forearm during morning practice, had surgery to insert a plate that afternoon and was expected to miss 6–8 weeks. June had previously missed some training camp time due to a knee injury. On August 28, June was placed on season-ending injured reserve due to his injured forearm. He was released with an injury settlement on September 3, making him a free agent.

=== Chicago Bears ===
June signed with the Chicago Bears on December 1, 2009 June was signed as a replacement for Lance Briggs who had a knee injury. He played on special teams on December 6, against the St. Louis Rams, but was inactive the following week against the Green Bay Packers. He was waived on December 14 and replaced on the 53-man roster by practice squad member James Marten when Briggs returned to good health.

=== Omaha Nighthawks ===
June was signed by the Omaha Nighthawks of the United Football League on September 8, 2010. In June 2011, the Nighthawks dropped several players with NFL experience, including June.

=== NFL statistics ===
| Year | Team | GP | COMB | TOTAL | AST | SACK | FF | FR | FR YDS | INT | IR YDS | AVG IR | LNG | TD | PD |
|---|---|---|---|---|---|---|---|---|---|---|---|---|---|---|---|
| 2003 | IND | 11 | 8 | 6 | 2 | 0.0 | 0 | 0 | 0 | 0 | 0 | 0 | 0 | 0 | 0 |
| 2004 | IND | 16 | 110 | 84 | 26 | 0.0 | 0 | 2 | 0 | 2 | 71 | 36 | 71 | 0 | 8 |
| 2005 | IND | 13 | 102 | 68 | 34 | 0.0 | 0 | 0 | 0 | 5 | 115 | 23 | 36 | 2 | 6 |
| 2006 | IND | 16 | 143 | 97 | 46 | 1.0 | 2 | 1 | 0 | 3 | 14 | 5 | 8 | 0 | 4 |
| 2007 | TB | 16 | 69 | 48 | 21 | 0.0 | 1 | 0 | 0 | 1 | 0 | 0 | 0 | 0 | 4 |
| 2008 | TB | 16 | 67 | 49 | 18 | 0.0 | 0 | 0 | 0 | 1 | 1 | 1 | 1 | 0 | 2 |
| Career | | 88 | 499 | 352 | 147 | 1.0 | 3 | 3 | 0 | 12 | 201 | 17 | 71 | 2 | 24 |

== Coaching career ==
=== Early coaching career ===
June served as the Anacostia defensive coordinator for the 2011 season and took over as head coach of a team that had gone 1–17 over the prior to season as head coach for the 2012 season. In July 2014, the Detroit Lions announced that June would join their staff as one of four Bill Walsh Minority Fellowship Interns, but June coached Anacostia to a 4–8 record in 2014. In three seasons at Anacostia, June compiled a 12–23 record before accepting a position as head coach at Charles Herbert Flowers High School in Prince George's County for the 2015 season.

=== Howard ===
In April 2016, June became the running backs coach and assistant recruiting coordinator at Howard University for Howard Bison football.

=== UMass ===
On March 4, 2020, June was hired as the outside linebacker coach for the Massachusetts Minutemen.

=== Bowling Green ===
In 2021 he served as the outside linebackers coach for Bowling Green.

=== Indianapolis Colts ===
In 2022 he became the assistant linebackers coach for the Colts under Jeff Saturday.

== Personal life ==
The name Cato is of Nigerian origin and goes back for generations in his family. His great-great-grandfather, Cato, was a runaway slave and the name had been passed along through eight previous generations. According to one source the name means "wise and cautious".

June's mother, Marjani, is a minister who spent nine months helping in New Orleans, Louisiana in the aftermath of Hurricane Katrina. She disapproves of June's tattoos. One of his tattoos reads "Big Time" for his high school and college nickname. He got his first tattoo of his college number 2 after he turned 18 while playing for Michigan.

75-year-old Will June, his grandfather, became the oldest player to bowl consecutive perfect games on August 31, 2010.

In college, June and Hobson were roommates. They were known for having sessions of Madden NFL 2003 for PlayStation 2 in an apartment known as "The Stadium", where competition among football team members often occurred. At Tampa, he had two-time defending Madden Bowl champion Alex Smith as a teammate and June, who is known as a vocal player, voiced an interest in playing him. As a professional, June became an avid fantasy football owner, and he eventually started playing in a league only for NFL players. He was the champion of the 2008 NFL Players league. June enjoys workouts that consist of boxing.

During the 2005 season, June and Gary Brackett visited the three most successful Marion County, Indiana Vectren C5 food drive elementary schools. As part of a United Service Organizations event for Veterans Day 2008, June, Smith, Phillip Buchanon, and Aqib Talib played video games with United States military personnel. During Super Bowl XLIII week in Tampa, June hosted a celebrity benefit for the June Family Foundation, which offers career insights to disadvantaged youths.

June's son, Cato June Jr., signed with the Sam Houston Bearkats football team.
