= Mount Zion First Baptist Church =

Church in San Antonio, Texas, USA

Coordinates: 29.413506°N 98.473439°W

Mt. Zion First Baptist Church is an historic African American church located at 333 Martin Luther King Drive in San Antonio, Texas.

Founded in 1871 by former slaves, the church has provided ministerial services to thousands and played a major role in the civil rights movement of the city.

In 1949, the Rev. Claude Black Jr. became pastor and led the church to national prominence in the National Baptist Convention. Pastor Black, who would become a civil rights icon and city councilman would invite figures controversial at the time to speak from his pulpit. Some of those would include Thurgood Marshall, Adam Clayton Powell Jr, Azie Taylor Morton, Percy Sutton, Barbara Jordan and others. The church created the city's first black owned credit union as well as Project Free, a program dedicated to assisting the poor and elderly. The church was burned by arson in 1974, but rebuilt the following year.

== See also ==
History of African Americans in San Antonio
