= Karyne Jones Conley =

American politician (born 1953)

Karyne Denise Jones Conley (born 14 August 1953) is an American former politician.

Karyne Denise Jones was born in San Antonio on 14 August 1953. She attended Clark University, graduating in 1975, before completing a master's degree in public administration from Northern Illinois University in 1977. She later earned a second master's degree from Harvard University in 1995. Jones was married to Jim Conley, with whom she raised four children.

Karyne Jones Conley worked for Andrew Young throughout Young's tenure as a member of the United States House of Representatives and ambassador to the United Nations. She then taught at San Antonio College and served two terms on San Antonio's East Central School Board. The retirement of Lou Nelle Sutton left an open seat in District 120 of the Texas House of Representatives. Although Sutton and Henry Cisneros, among other Democrats, supported the campaign of Ruth Jones McClendon, Conley won the 1988 election. Conley took office on 10 January 1989, maintaining Democratic and African American control over that seat until her resignation on 8 July 1996.
