= ZerNona Black =

American academic

- Born: February 7, 1906; Muskogee, Oklahoma
- Died: January 24, 2005 (aged 98); San Antonio, Texas

ZerNona Stewart Black (1906–2005) was the wife of civil rights leader, the Rev. Claude Black.

She was an instructor at Langston University in Oklahoma and at St. Philip's College in San Antonio.

In 1943, she accepted a three-month transfer to the San Antonio YWCA-USO for Black Military, a group formed to help morale for African American service members and their families.

During the 1950s and 1960s, Black served alongside her husband in the Civil Rights Movement. Black had also founded several senior citizen daycare centers such as Health Incorporated, which earned her recognition from the nation's capital.

== Family ==
In 1946, ZerNona Stewart married Claude Black; they had two children, six grandchildren and nine greatgrandchildren.

== Death ==
In January 2005, Black died peacefully in her sleep, aged 98, two weeks short of her 59th wedding anniversary. She is interred in Meadowlawn Memorial Park in San Antonio, Texas.

== Legacy ==
The city of San Antonio has created The Rev. Claude and ZerNona Black Scholarship Endowment Fund.

== Trivia ==
- Per the Woodson Family Tree, she was a descendant of President Thomas Jefferson and his slave Sally Hemings.
- She was a member of Alpha Kappa Alpha, a noted African-American women's sorority.
