= James Kemp (NAACP) =

Former president of NAACP (1912–1983)

President of the NAACP
- In office 1982–1983
- Preceded by: William Montague Cobb
- Succeeded by: Enolia McMillan

Personal details
- Born: James Horace Kemp; August 18, 1912 Muskogee, Oklahoma, U.S.
- Died: December 5, 1983 (aged 71) Chicago, Illinois, U.S.

James Horace Kemp (18 August 1912 in Muskogee – 5 December 1983 in Chicago) was an American labor organizer and elected president of the NAACP. He was married to Maida Springer Kemp, a labor organizer and historian. He served on the executive board of the Chicago Federation of Labor. He was also a board member of the Regional Transportation Authority.

In 1969, Kemp was elected to the Illinois Constitutional Convention as a delegate from the 22nd legislative district, which covered Bronzeville and adjacent neighborhoods.

== Legacy ==
- METX 105, an EMD F40PH locomotive owned by Metra is named after James Kemp (because he was on the board of directors of the Regional Transit Authority, which oversees Metra). It entered service with Metra in 1977 and was the sixth F40PH to be delivered into their fleet. It currently serves the BNSF Line out of Chicago Union Station.
