= Joe A. Rector =

Joe A. Rector Sr.
- Born: Joe Allen Rector Sr. August 12, 1935; Muskogee, Oklahoma, U.S.
- Died: August 19, 2012 (aged 77); Destin, Florida, U.S.
- Occupations: Painter, illustrator, educator, weightlifter
- Known for: Western and Native American figurative art

Joe Allen Rector Sr. (August 12, 1935 – August 19, 2012) was an American painter, illustrator, educator, and competitive weightlifter from Muskogee, Oklahoma. He was known for Western and Native American-themed figurative artwork distributed through regional galleries, commercial illustration, and print reproduction networks in Oklahoma and surrounding states. He is documented in regional obituary records and biographical compilations of Oklahoma cultural figures.

== Early life and education ==
Rector was born in Muskogee, Oklahoma, where he spent most of his life. He graduated from Muskogee Central High School in 1953.

He later attended Northeastern State University and completed additional teacher certification coursework at Oklahoma State University.

He began drawing at an early age, initially copying comic book imagery before developing a focus on commercial illustration and Western figurative art.

== Teaching career ==
Rector worked as an educator in Muskogee, Oklahoma, including teaching positions at Alice Robertson Junior High School and Indian Capital Area Vocational-Technical School.

His teaching contributed to vocational and arts education programs in the Muskogee public school system.

== Athletic career ==
Rector was a competitive weightlifter and is reported in biographical sources to have achieved state, national, and world records in his division.

His athletic background influenced his artistic emphasis on anatomy, strength, and figurative realism.

== Artistic career and exhibitions ==
Rector developed a career as a Western and figurative artist whose work depicted Native American figures, frontier life, and historical Western themes. His artwork circulated through gallery exhibitions, mall-based display venues, and commercial print reproduction networks.

He was included in Movers and Shakers: Step Into a Place Where Dreams Are Realized by Victoria Lee, a regional biographical compilation documenting notable individuals in Oklahoma cultural and civic life, and is credited with illustrating the cover artwork for the publication.

He also produced commercial illustration work for regional publications, including cover artwork for a Tulsa wrestling program titled State Championships: Kids Wrestling Championships (February 17–18, 1995), featuring his work Ultimate Challenge as cover art.

He is also listed on the State of Oklahoma’s official “Famous Oklahomans” compilation of notable individuals from the state.

== Oral Roberts University – Journey Through the Bible context ==
In 1986, The Oklahoman reported on the Journey Through the Bible multimedia exhibition at Oral Roberts University in Tulsa, a large-scale immersive installation depicting biblical narratives including Creation-themed environments and staged biblical scenes.

Rector is credited in a later regional religious publication with contributing artwork titled Adam – The Creation of Man, associated with ORU-related Journey Through the Bible materials and presentation elements.

Secondary sources associate his work with creation-themed visual materials used in ORU-related publications; however, no publicly archived ORU exhibit credit list confirming his formal role has been located.

== Community involvement and charitable work ==
Rector participated in community-oriented artistic and fundraising efforts in Muskogee. His artwork was used in local charitable initiatives, including fundraising distributions of signed prints such as Sharing for Ark of Faith, "Up from the Ashes" for West Junior High fire recovery efforts,"The Centennial" celebrating Muskogee's First 100 Years and contributing other works of art supporting civic and community organizations. (Further independent citation needed.)

== Artistic distribution and regional presence ==
Rector’s artwork was exhibited and distributed through regional galleries and commercial venues in Oklahoma and surrounding states, including Muskogee and Tulsa exhibition spaces and retail display environments.

His work also circulated through commercial print reproduction networks and was collected privately across multiple regions of the United States.

== Personal life ==
Rector married Marilyn Rector in 1964, and the marriage ended in 1978. In 1979 he married Deborah L. Rector, and the couple remained married until his death in 2012.

He was the father of multiple children, including Joe A. Rector Jr., Terri Rector, Leslie E. Rector, Roy Q. Rector, Letitia Williams, and William Alex Rector, as well as adopted sons Michael L. Rector and Elijah Rector.

Following his death, his artistic estate has been managed by family members responsible for preservation and distribution of his remaining works.

== Death ==
Rector died on August 19, 2012, in Destin, Florida.
