= G. J. Sutton =

American politician

Garlington Jerome “G. J.” Sutton (June 22, 1909 – June 22, 1976) was the first black official elected from San Antonio, Texas, United States.

== Early life and marriage ==
G.J. Sutton was the eighth of fifteen children. His parents Samuel and Lillian were both educators with his father being one of the first blacks in Bexar County. He also served as principal of three high schools. All of his siblings graduated from college. His brothers included Percy Sutton (owner of Apollo Theater in New York City, attorney for Nation of Islam leader Malcolm X, and Manhattan Borough President) and Oliver Sutton (a judge on the New York Supreme Court).

Sutton attended Wiley College in Marshall, Texas, but earned his Bachelor of Science degree from Wilberforce University in 1932. He later gain a degree in mortuary science from Cincinnati College.

He married Ms. Jeffrey Plummer and had one daughter who they named Jeffrey Dean Sutton. He later married Lou Nelle Callahan in 1958 with whom he remained with until his death. GJ is survived by his daughter Jeffrey Dean Sutton who married Army Lt. Col. Stonell B. Greene and had three daughters: Jerilan Denise Greene, Janiece Birnell Greene and Jeffrey Lynette Greene.

== Business ==
In 1938, Sutton joined his brother to operate Sutton and Sutton Mortuary. The mortuary is still in business today. He also founded Gates of Heaven Memorial Gardens Cemetery in San Antonio. He is buried alongside his wife at that cemetery in the family plot.

== Politics ==
Sutton served as a delegate to the 1960 Democratic National Convention. When the Texas House of Representatives redrew their districts in 1972, Sutton became the first black official elected in San Antonio. He served in that capacity until his death on his birthday in 1976. He was a founding member of the Texas Legislative Black Caucus, established in 1973. With the encouragement of his best friend Claude Black, his wife Lou Nelle Sutton ran and succeeded her husband in the Texas House of Representatives.

There is a Federal building named in his honor, which is located in San Antonio. It is in the outskirts of downtown at 321 N. Center St. It has become an office building for Health and Human Service Commission (HHSC).

Preceded by Obsolete district	Member of the Texas House of Representatives from District 57 (San Antonio); 1973–1976	Succeeded by Lou Nelle Sutton
