= Charles Hudspeth (activist) =

American civil rights activist

Charles Hudspeth (1918–1999) was a civil rights leader from San Antonio, Texas.

== History ==
Hudspeth was the president of the San Antonio Branch of the NAACP during the 1950s and 1960. He was considered to be one of the best NAACP presidents in the state. During his tenure, he organized several demonstrations at local businesses throughout the community. One march at a local grocery store Handy Andy resulting in a white man pulling a gun on Hudspeth and threatening to kill him.

While remaining active in his community after the civil rights movement, Hudspeth devoted more of his time to his family and church. For more than 20 years, he served as chairmen of the trustee board at the historic San Antonio church Mt Zion First Baptist Church.

Charles Hudspeth died in 1999 following a lengthy battle with cancer. He was buried alongside his wife of nearly 60 years, Mary Louise at Meadowlawn Memorial Park. All three of their children Louis, Gregory and Armeania (Mimi) became noted professionals. Their son Gregory is now Dean at St. Phillips College in San Antonio. Mimi presently serves as the Campus Instructional Coordinator for the San Antonio Independent School District.
