= YouthBuild Global =

American non-profit organization

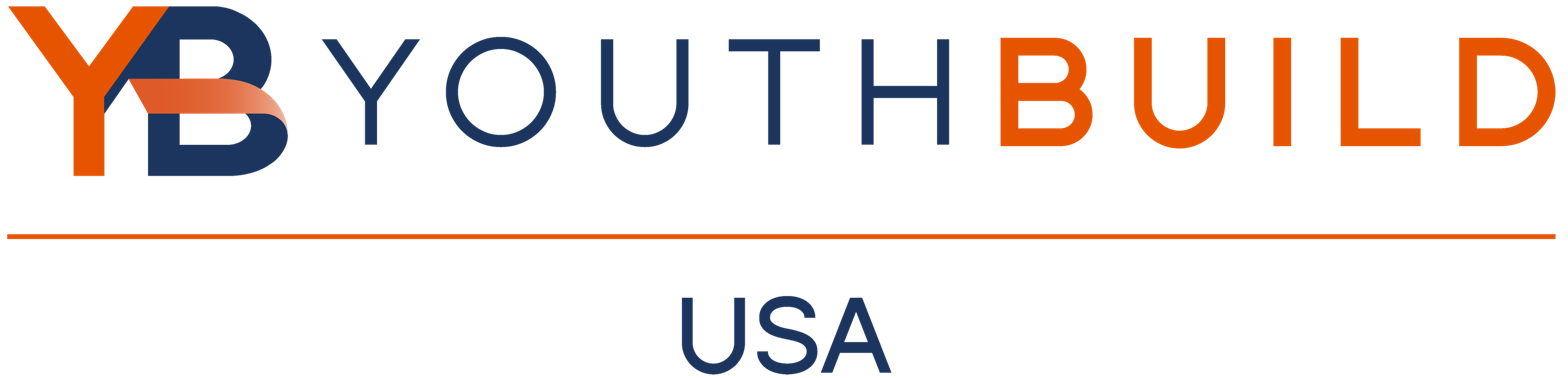
- Type: Non-profit organization
- Headquarters: Roxbury, Massachusetts
- CEO: John Valverde
- Key people: Dorothy Stoneman, John Valverde
- Website: youthbuild.org

YouthBuild Global is a non-profit organization that serves as headquarters for a network of more than 320 local YouthBuild programs around the world. These programs provide education, job training and leadership development to opportunity youth — young people between the ages 16 and 24 who are out of school or out of work. The headquarters are in Roxbury, Massachusetts.

The YouthBuild program has five components: construction, education, counseling, leadership, and graduate opportunity. Students spend every other week on a job site, learning the construction trade by building homes for their own communities. This creates housing for low-income people, and also gives the students marketable job skills. The alternate weeks are spent on education in the YouthBuild classroom, with the goal of attaining a GED or completing their high school diploma. Many YouthBuild students come directly from the streets or from difficult life situations, so counseling is available to help them deal with anger management, family responsibilities, and other adjustment / life direction issues. Leadership is taught explicitly in YouthBuild programs, based on the philosophy that young people are not a burden, but rather a resource to be tapped. This, combined with ensuring opportunity and placement for graduates, means that many YouthBuild graduates go on to college, work in the non-profit sector, serve on committees, or even run in local politics.

Funding for YouthBuild previously came primarily from the Department of Housing and Urban Development, but has transitioned to the Department of Labor. Other funding sources for programs are widely varied, but include other government agencies, private foundations, corporations, and individual donors.

Founded and directed by Dorothy Stoneman and John Bell, one of the main purposes of YouthBuild is to build affordable housing for low-income families. Since 1994, more than 19,000 homes have been built by 92,000 YouthBuild students.
