= Claude Black (minister) =

American civil rights activist

Claude William Black Jr. (November 28, 1916 – March 13, 2009) was an American Baptist minister and political figure. Black was born in San Antonio, Texas, which was segregated at the time. Black's parents are Claude Sr., who served as the Vice President of the Brotherhood of Sleeping Car Porters, and Cora Black, who was a housewife.

== Biography ==
=== Ministry ===
While attending Morehouse College in Atlanta, Black initially aspired to be a doctor, but was led to the ministry. He then attended Andover Newton Theological School.

Black served as pastor of Mt. Zion First Baptist Church in San Antonio for 1949–98 and as pastor emeritus since. Previously, he had served as pastor of Calvary Baptist Church in Haverhill, Massachusetts (1941–43) and St. Matthew Baptist Church in Corpus Christi, Texas (1946–49).

Black founded several community groups as well as the city's first black credit union. He also served as chairmen of the Social Actions Committee with the National Baptist Convention and president of the Baptist Minister's Union of San Antonio. He worked through the community as a pastor of the community.

=== Civil rights activism ===
Black was known throughout the South for his activism in the Civil Rights Movement. Throughout the late 1950s and 1960s, he along with State Representative G. J. Sutton and Harry Burns led and organized marches throughout the state. He challenged former Texas Governor Price Daniel, former San Antonio Mayor Walter McAllister and the establishment for their unfair treatment of minorities in the city. While addressing a city council meeting in 1952, he was ignored and called a ------ on the open microphone. He became an associate of such leaders as A. Philip Randolph, Martin Luther King Jr., Thurgood Marshall, Adam Clayton Powell Jr., James Farmer, Ella Baker and others. As a local ally to President Lyndon B. Johnson, Black was present for the White House Conference on Civil Rights in 1966. He endured many threats to himself, his family and even his church. In 1974, a drive-by shooting occurred at his home and his church burned, with no suspects being charged. Black supported the efforts of San Antonio branch of the Student Nonviolent Coordinating Committee (SNCC), after a massive demonstration against police brutality in downtown San Antonio and an armed attack on the SNCC office. He allowed use of the church for meetings of the San Antonio Committee to Free Angela Davis, SNCC-Panther meetings, and allowed members of the SNCC-Panthers opportunities to raise funds at the church on Sunday. Rev. Black co-authored a city council resolution against the sale of the South African Krugerrand Gold Coin, in December 1976, before Nelson Mandela was released from prison.

He served four terms of the San Antonio City Council, 1973–78, and became the city's first black Mayor Pro Tem.

== Legacy ==
Black was married to ZerNona Black (1912–2005) for a total of 59 years. He was predeceased by his adopted daughter Joyce (1952–1992), son Stewart (1931–1994) and three grandchildren.

San Antonio has a street, shopping plaza, and community center named in honor of Black. The city of San Antonio created the Rev. Claude and ZerNona Black Scholarship Endowment Fund. Black also served on the Advisory Council of Wayland Baptist University's San Antonio campus; the campus named its award given to the outstanding student earning the Master of Christian Ministry degree in his honor. On November 30, 2006, Black was honored with an extravagant 90th Birthday gala, which was hosted by both the city of San Antonio. Guest included Martin Luther King III, Fred Shuttlesworth, Henry Cisneros, Percy Sutton and Phil Hardberger.

Black's autobiography Grandpa was a Preacher: A Letter to my Grandson was published in 2006. It was co-written with his grandson Taj Matthews.

The MLK Realizing the Dream Foundation honored Rev. Black in Washington during Inauguration Week along with Congressman Ted Kennedy, Congressman John Lewis and activist, humanitarian Aung San Suu Kyi. Black was present at some of King's civil rights speeches, including his famous I Have a Dream speech.

The Claude and ZerNona Black Papers are housed at Trinity University Coates Library in San Antonio, Texas.

== Death ==
Black died on March 13, 2009, in San Antonio, Texas, following a lengthy illness.

== See also ==
- List of civil rights leaders
