= List of highways in San Antonio =

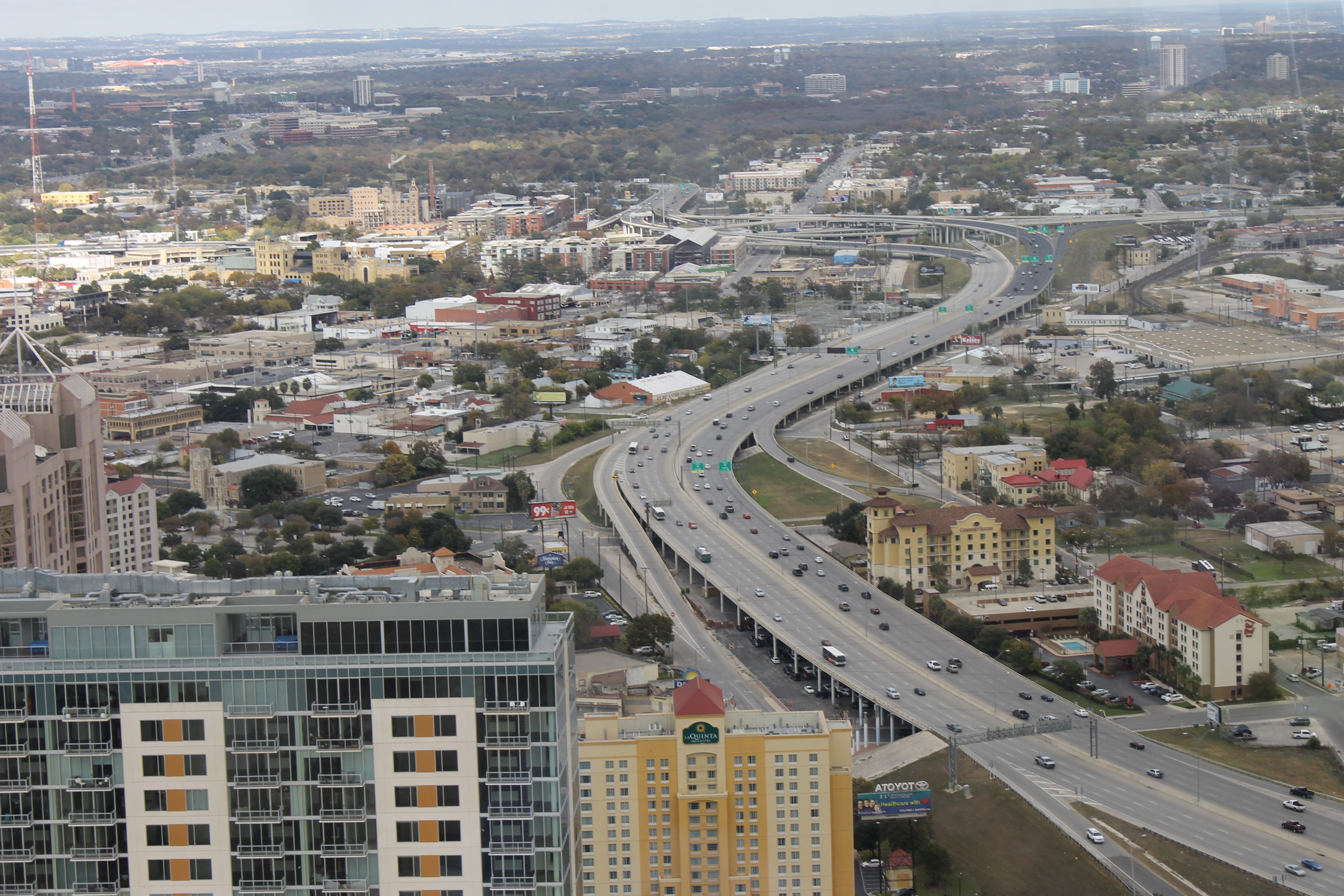
Interstate 37 from the top of the Tower of the Americas in San Antonio, Texas

This is a list of highways in San Antonio in the U.S. state of Texas, consisting of Interstates, U.S. highways, state highways, state highway loops and spurs maintained by the Texas Department of Transportation (TxDOT) in the San Antonio metropolitan area, consisting of Bexar County and its seven surrounding counties. They range from multi-lane freeways that provide high-volume corridors to 2-lane roads. In addition to the four Interstates, which must be freeways per the Interstate Highway standards, US 90, US 281, SH 151, and the northern part of Loop 1604 are also freeways in San Antonio. There are also a couple instances where other highways run concurrently with the aforementioned freeways; US 87 and SH 16 run concurrently with I-10 and I-410 respectively.

San Antonio's freeway system is built in resemblance of a hub and spoke system, with Downtown San Antonio at the center. I-10, I-35, and I-37 combine to form a nine-mile Central Loop around Downtown. I-410 and Loop 1604 are the other two urban loops around the city. Connecting all three loops are the city's radial freeways—for example, I-10 West (towards El Paso) serves the northwest side of the city. A large portion of trade between Mexico and the United States passes through the San Antonio area's interstate highway system.

== Interstates ==
Highway	Location	Length	Description	Date established	Notes
I-10 (Note: Has a portion outside the metropolitan area, mileage and date established are only for portions within the metropolitan area.)	Bexar, Guadalupe and Kendall Counties	108 mi (174 km)	Known as the Robert F. McDermott Freeway on the northwest side from Loop 1604 to I-35 (northwest corner of Downtown), this section was formerly called the Northwest Expressway. Concurrency with US 87 starting in Comfort, TX. Some landmarks along this section include the Dominion, Six Flags Fiesta Texas, University of Texas at San Antonio campus, USAA, South Texas Medical Center, and Crossroads Mall. Also has a double-decked section for three miles between Fredericksburg Rd. and Downtown San Antonio. Covers the western border of Downtown in concurrency with I-35. Covers the southern border of Downtown in concurrency with US 90. Known as the Jose Lopez Freeway from I-35 (Downtown) to I-410 on the east side. Goes to El Paso to the northwest and to Houston to the east, acting as a hurricane evacuation route coming west.	1959	
I-35	Atascosa, Bexar, Comal, Guadalupe and Medina Counties	79 mi (127 km)	Known as the Pan Am Expressway from I-410 on the southside to Loop 1604 on the northside. This is the only radial freeway in San Antonio that does not have a name change. Serves the northeast and southwest sides of the city. Covers the northern and western borders of Downtown San Antonio. Has double-decked sections and a concurrency with I-10/US 87 through Downtown. Concurrency with I-410 on the Windcrest-San Antonio city line. Some landmarks along this route include South Park Mall, University of Texas at San Antonio Downtown Campus, Market Square, Splashtown, Fort Sam Houston, and AT&T Center. Goes to Laredo to the southwest and to Austin, Waco, and Dallas–Fort Worth to the northeast.	1959	
I-37	Atascosa and Bexar Counties	59 mi (95 km)	Known as the Lucian Adams Freeway from I-410 to I-10 (southeast corner of Downtown). Covers the eastern border of Downtown in concurrency with US 281, where it is known as the William J. Bordelon Freeway. Some landmarks include Brooks City Base, several missions (San Juan Capistrano, San Jose, and Concepcion), Paseo del Rio (Riverwalk), Alamo, Alamodome, Tower of the Americas, Institute of Texan Cultures, Historic Sunset Station, and San Antonio Museum of Art. Goes to Corpus Christi to the southeast, and is used as a hurricane evacuation route coming north.	1959	
I-410	Bexar County	49.488 mi (79.643 km)	A loop route of I-10 around San Antonio. It is identified as Connally Loop in honor of former Texas governor John B. Connally At the northern end of I-410 is Uptown San Antonio. Northern arc from US-90 to I-35 covers heavily urbanized areas. Landmarks in the Northern half include Southwest Research Institute, Ingram Park Mall, Crossroads Mall, North Star Mall, San Antonio International Airport, and Fort Sam Houston. Briefly covers northeastern part of San Antonio in concurrency with I-35. Southern arc from I-35 to US-90 is more rural. Landmarks in the Southern half include the Brooks City Base, Mission San Juan Capistrano, Mission Espada, Palo Alto College, and Texas A&M University—San Antonio. The freeway is suitable for hazardous cargo transportation through the area.	1959	

== U.S. highways ==
Highway	Location	Length	Description	Date established	Notes
US 87	Bexar, Kendall and Wilson Counties	109 mi (175 km)	US 87 is concurrent with I-10 for most of its travel through San Antonio. From I-10 to the highway's exit from the city, it is known as Roland Avenue (briefly) and then as Rigsby Avenue. Goes to Victoria to the east-southeast.	1935	
US 90	Bexar, Guadalupe and Medina Counties	109 mi (175 km)	Known as the Cleto Rodriguez Freeway on the west side of the city, from Loop 1604 to I-10/35, at the southwest corner of Downtown. After this, the highway is concurrent with I-10 to Seguin. On the west side, some landmarks include Lackland Air Force Base and Kelly U.S.A. (formerly Kelly Air Force Base). Goes to Castroville, Uvalde, and Del Rio to the west, a few of many towns.	1927	
US 181	Bexar and Wilson Counties		Intersects with I-37 south of the city and runs southeast from there. Follows a similar route as I-37 to Corpus Christi. Is used as a hurricane evacuation route.	1927	
US 281	Atascosa, Bexar and Comal Counties		Known as the Walter W. McAllister Freeway from I-35 (northeast corner of Downtown) to Spur 537. Also known as San Pedro Avenue from Spur 537 to Sonterra Boulevard. Concurrency with I-37 in Downtown, lasting until I-410, where it heads west in a brief concurrency. It heads south afterwards, out of the city. Known for its beautiful setting as it winds around San Antonio landmarks such as Brackenridge Park, Trinity University, Alamo Stadium, Sunken Gardens Amphitheatre, University of the Incarnate Word, Olmos Basin Park, San Antonio International Airport, Broadway, Historic Pearl Brewery, and Stone Oak. Goes through the Texas Hill Country to nearby Bulverde, Spring Branch, Canyon Lake and Johnson City in the north and to Pleasanton, another concurrency with I-37, Three Rivers, and ultimately the Rio Grande Valley to the south. Construction of a limited-access freeway north of Loop 1604 is underway, planned to be fully completed sometime in the mid-2020s.	1935	

== State highways ==
Highway	Location	Length	Description	Date established	Notes
SH 16	Atascosa, Bandera, Bexar and Medina Counties		SH 16 is known as Palo Alto Road from the Bexar-Atascosa County Line to I-410. SH 16 shares an overlap with I-410 for about 20 miles. It is known locally as Bandera Road from I-410 to the Bexar-Medina County Line. The highway visits Leon Valley and Helotes before entering the Hill Country. It is locally known as Palo Alto Road south from I-410 to the Bexar-Atascosa County Line.	1926	
SH 130	Bexar, and Guadalupe Counties		SH 130 is concurrent with I-410 at its southern terminus at I-35, and eventually US 281. It joins the I-10/US 90 concurrency on the east side of the city, and runs concurrent with I-10 until Exit 614, about 4 miles east of Seguin, where it becomes a limited access freeway. Heading towards Austin, it has the highest speed limit of any limited access tollway in the United States at 85 mph. It can be considered a bypass of the entire I-35 corridor, running from Southern San Antonio to Georgetown.	2011 (San Antonio Designation)	
SH 151	Bexar County	10.667 mi (17.167 km)	Known as the Raymond E. Stotzer Jr. Freeway, SH 151 is a state highway that runs from Loop 1604 to US 90 in San Antonio. SH 151 is a limited access freeway for its entire length, however at Loop 1604 heading West a traffic light controls the junction to turn onto Loop 1604 South. The routing of the freeway was first conceived in 1983 and construction was conducted in phases through the 1980s and 1990s until completion in 2004. The freeway provides access to the western part of San Antonio, the Sea World theme park, Chase, and the future site of a Microsoft data center. In 2017, an interchange between Loop 1604 and East SH 151 was completed, providing non-stop flow to the latter, and pushing back the western terminus to the connecting Alamo Ranch Parkway.	1984	
SH 211	Bexar and Medina Counties	11.184 mi (17.999 km)	Known as Texas Research Parkway, there is a gap in the highway between FM 471 and FM 1957. This was originally going to be the outer loop for San Antonio, replacing Loop 1604 and I-410. Its northernmost terminus is with SH 16 near the Bexar-Medina County Line, and its southernmost terminus is with US 90 about 4 miles outside of Loop 1604	1986	
SH 218	Bexar County	3.985 mi (6.413 km)	Known as Pat Booker Road its entire length. Serves as a connector road from I-35 to FM 78 at Randolph Air Force Base.	1936	

== State highway loops and spurs ==
Highway	Location	Length	Description	Date established	Notes
Loop 13	Bexar County	21.684 mi (34.897 km)	A partial loop route around the city of San Antonio. Prior to I-410, Loop 13 served as the primary loop for the city. Loop 13 follows Military Drive from US 90 through the south side of the city. It then follows W.W. White road after it turns to the north through the east side of San Antonio before ending at I-410. The road is still a major arterial for the city, providing access to Lackland Air Force Base, Kelly USA, and Brooks City-Base.		
Spur 53	Bexar County	1.576 mi (2.536 km)	Known as UTSA Boulevard. Serves as a connector route from the southern entrance of the University of Texas at San Antonio to I-10. It was planned to be expanded, but plans were cancelled in 2014 as its designation was removed, and control of the road was returned to the City of San Antonio in 2019	1980	
Spur 66	Bexar County	1.5 miles (2.4 km)	Known as Lone Star Pass. Connects Watson Road to SH 16. Its designation was removed in 2014, and control returned to the City of San Antonio in 2019.	2003	
Loop 106	Bexar County	1.760 mi (2.832 km)	An old alignment of US 87 through Sayers.	1981	
Loop 107	Bexar County	1.335 mi (2.148 km)	An old alignment of US 87 through Lone Oak.	1981	
Spur 117	Bexar County	0.546 mi (0.879 km)	A short spur route that connects I-410 and Loop 13 in San Antonio. The spur follows W.W. White Road from I-410 on the southeast side of San Antonio towards the northwest ending at Loop 13.	1980	
Spur 122	Bexar County	5.664 mi (9.115 km)	A spur route that follows a former route of US 181 in San Antonio. Spur 122 follows Presa Street from US 181 near the city limits on the southeast side of San Antonio towards the northwest ending at Loop 13 just east of the San Antonio River. The spur provides access to Mission San Francisco de la Espada and other parks along the banks of the San Antonio River.	1964	
Loop 345	Bexar County	8.238 mi (13.258 km)	Also known to the locals as Fredericksburg Road, it is a loop route that follows a former route of US 87 in San Antonio and Balcones Heights. Loop 345 follows the northern section of Fredericksburg Road, from I-410 near Balcones Heights towards the northwest, ending at a point on I-10 near the USAA headquarters. The road is still a major arterial for the city, providing access to USAA as well as to the South Texas Medical Center. Designation of Loop 345 originally started northwest of Downtown, at another point along I-10, however control of the section inside I-410 was returned to the City of San Antonio in 2014, and the remaining designation was renamed as Spur 345.	1962	
Loop 353	Bexar County	7.875 mi (12.674 km)	A loop route that follows a former route of US 81 in San Antonio. Loop 353 follows New Laredo Highway from I-35 on the southwest side of San Antonio towards the northeast and follows Nogalitos Street before ending at another point on I-35 just southwest of Downtown San Antonio. The road is still a major arterial for the city, providing access to Kelly USA.	1961	
Loop 368	Bexar County	8.115 mi (13.060 km)	A loop route that follows a former route of US 81 in San Antonio. Loop 368 follows Broadway Street from I-35 northeast of Downtown San Antonio towards the northeast and follows Austin Highway before ending near the interchange of I-35 and I-410 in Fratt. The road is still a major arterial for the city, providing access to Brackenridge Park, the San Antonio Zoo and the University of the Incarnate Word, all of which are in the city's Brackenridge Park District.	1962	
Spur 371	Bexar County	1.778 mi (2.861 km)	A limited-access spur route in San Antonio. Spur 371 follows General Hudnell Drive from the former Kelly Air Force Base to US 90 southwest of Downtown San Antonio. The highway provides access to the Kelly USA industrial park.	1962	
Spur 421	Bexar County	6.013 mi (9.677 km)	A connector route from I-410/SH 16 to I-10. Known as Bandera Road and Culebra Road.	1965	
Spur 422	Bexar County	1.66 mi (2.67 km)	Connector road for SH 16. Runs from I-410 to I-35 on the southside. Although it is not a limited access freeway, it is known as the Poteet-Jourdanton Freeway.	1965	
Spur 536	Bexar County	7.035 mi (11.322 km)	An old alignment of US 281. Runs from I-410 on the southside to I-10/35 in Downtown. Known as Roosevelt Avenue and Alamo Street.	1978	
Spur 537	Bexar County	1.548 mi (2.491 km)	An old alignment of US 281 on the northside, near the San Antonio Int'l Airport. It runs from I-410 to US 281 and is currently known as San Pedro Avenue. Control was returned to the City of San Antonio in 2014.	1978	
PA 1502	Bexar County	9.7 mi (15.611 km)	A project that was only completed by 2015, Wurzbach Parkway connects the northeast and northwest sides of San Antonio. The route passes the San Antonio Int'l Airport, Morgan's Wonderland, and McAllister Park.	2015	
Loop 1604	Bexar County	94.387 mi (151.901 km)	The current outer loop for San Antonio. Mainly known as the Charles W. Anderson Loop. Also known as Rockport Road, MacDonia-Somerset Road, Addicks-Kenuper Road, and St. Hedwig Road. Prior to August 2016, the northern section between Braun Road and FM 78 is a limited access freeway. In August 2016 however, a portion of 1604, between Braun Road and SH 151 was rebuilt as a limited access freeway, to ease traffic flow and conditions of the surrounding areas, with plans to extend limited access to U.S. 90. This extension of the limited access freeway to U.S. 90 was completed in early 2020.	1977	

== Gallery ==
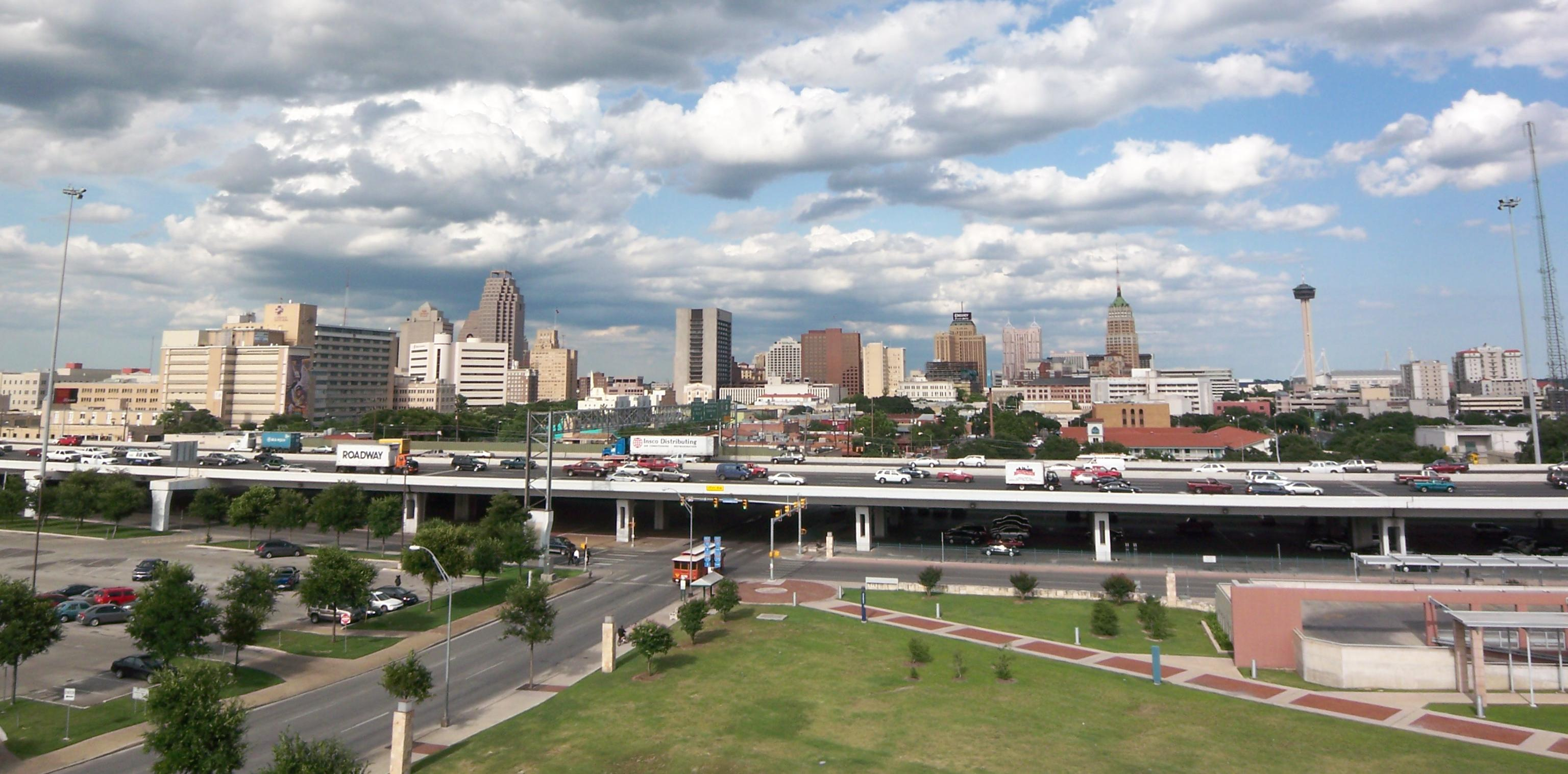
I-10 and I-35 running concurrently on the western end of Downtown San Antonio

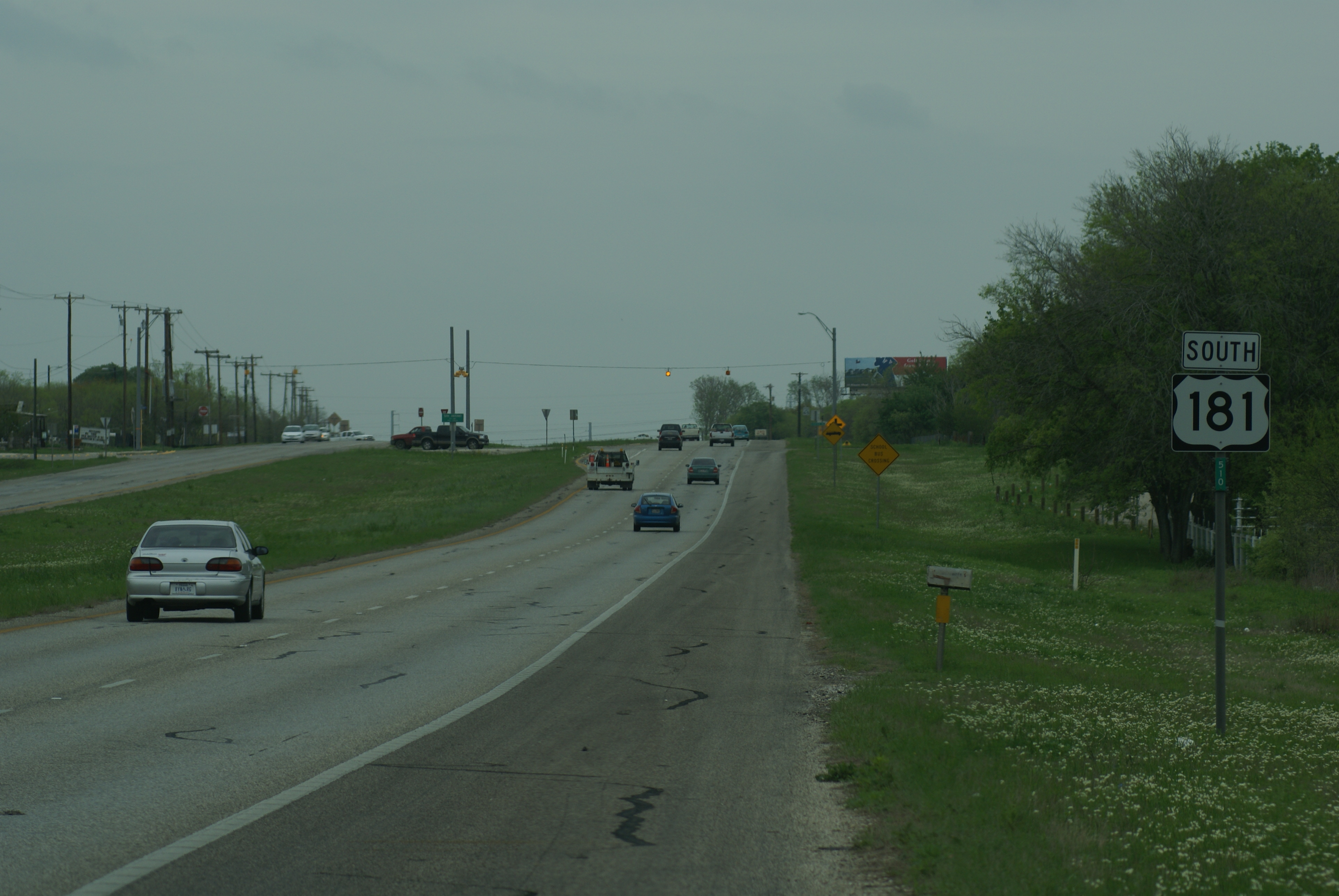
US 181 near its northern terminus southeast of San Antonio

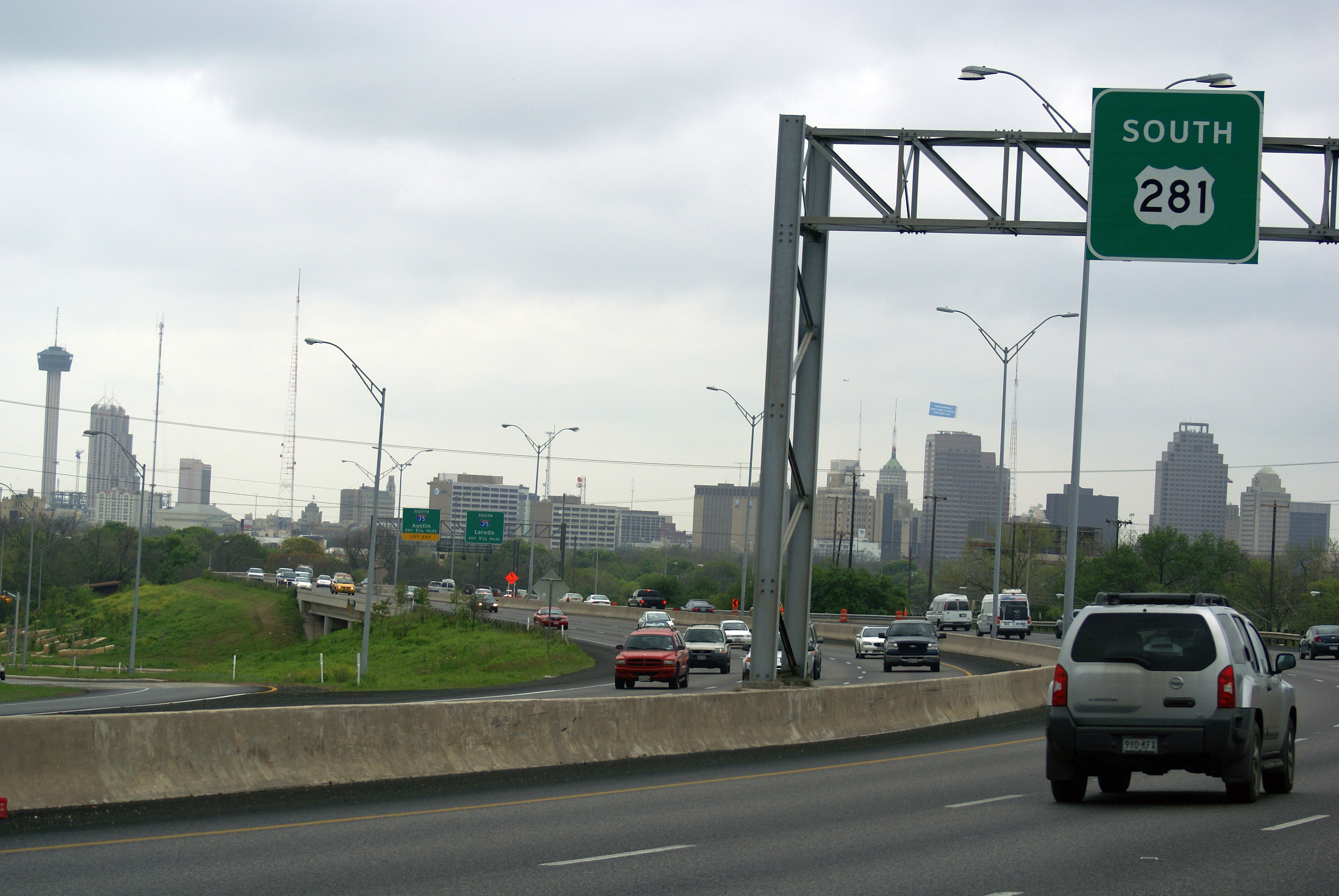
US 281 heading south towards Downtown San Antonio

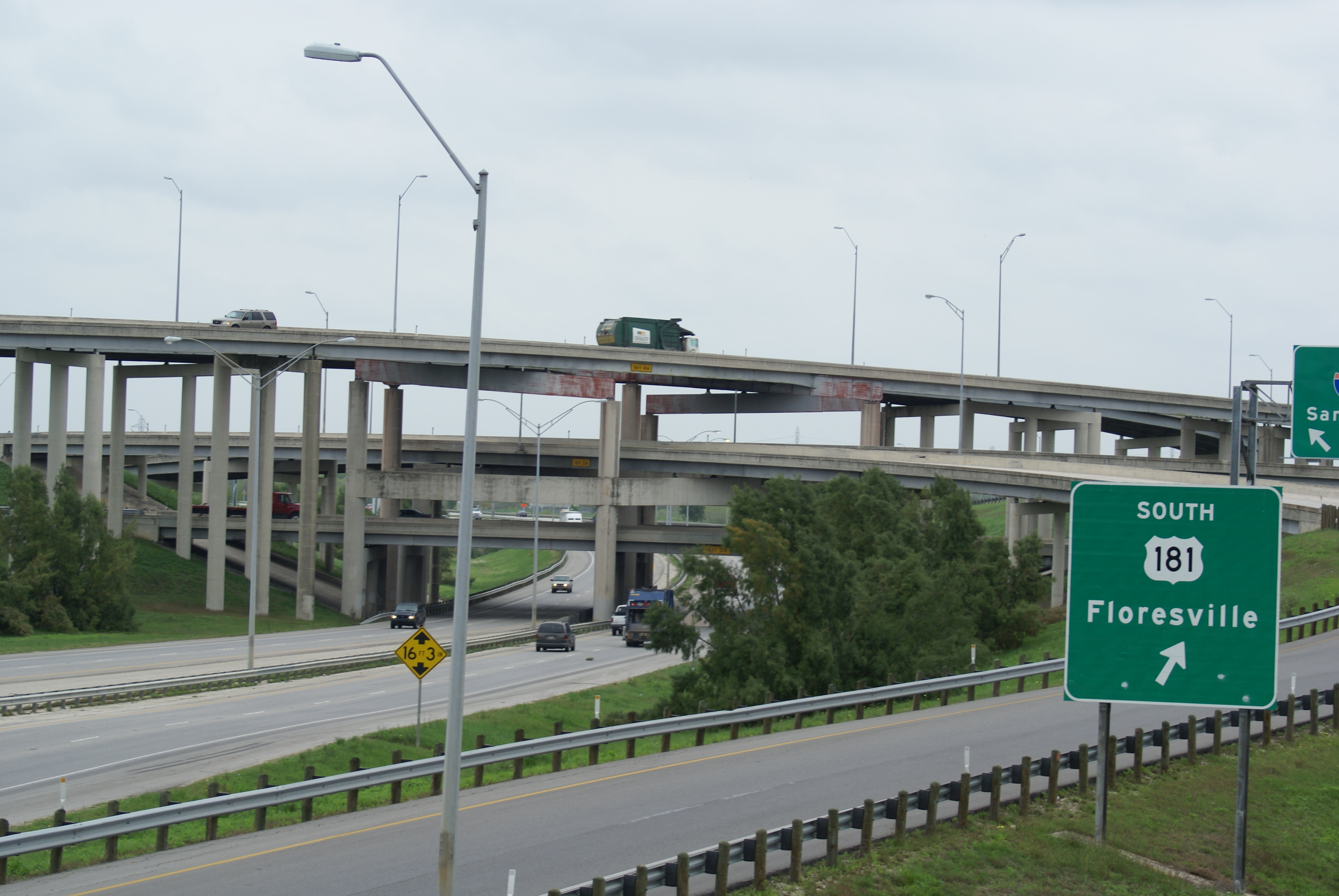
I-410's interchange with I-37 on the southeast side of San Antonio

== See also ==
- List of state highways in Texas
