= Texas State Highway Spur 536 =

State highway in Texas

State Highway Spur 536

Route information
- Maintained by TxDOT
- Length: 7.035 mi (11.322 km)
- Existed: 1978–present

Major junctions
- South end: I-410 / US 281
- Loop 13; I-10 / US 87 / US 90
- North end: I-10 / I-35 / US 87

Location
- Country: United States
- State: Texas
- Counties: Bexar

Highway system
- Highways in Texas; Interstate; US; State; Former; Toll; Loops; Spurs; FM/RM; Park; Rec
← Spur 535	→ Spur 537

State Highway Spur 536 (Spur 536) is a state highway spur in San Antonio, Texas.

== Route description ==
Spur 536 begins at the intersection of US 281 and Loop 410; northbound US 281 follows Loop 410 to the east, while Spur 536 continues north along Roosevelt Avenue through the mission district of San Antonio. The route passes the west side of Stinson Municipal Airport before crossing Loop 13 (Military Drive). Spur 536 turns northwest onto Steves Avenue (crossing under I-10), then north onto Probandt Avenue through Southtown. It then turns west along Alamo Street before ending at I-10/35.

== History ==
Spur 536 was designated on February 23, 1978, along with Spur 537, due to the rerouting of US 281 along the Interstate 37 freeway through central and south San Antonio. Spur 536 was proposed for decommissioning in 2014 as part of TxDOT's San Antonio turnback proposal, which would have turned back over 129 miles of roads to the city of San Antonio, but the city of San Antonio rejected that proposal.

== Major intersections ==
The entire route is in San Antonio, Bexar County.

mi	km	Destinations	Notes
0.0	0.0	I-410 (Connally Loop) / US 281 north / SH 130	Southern terminus, continues as US 281 south – Pleasanton
0.9	1.4	South Flores Street	
2.3	3.7	Loop 13 – Lackland AFB, Brooks City-Base	
2.8	4.5	Mission Road	
3.5	5.6	Southcross Boulevard	
3.7	6.0	Bridge over San Antonio River	
4.9	7.9	Steves Avenue east	Route continues along Steves Avenue west
5.2	8.4	Mission Road	
5.3	8.5	Bridge over San Antonio River	
5.6	9.0	Probandt Street south / to I-10 / US 87 / US 90 – Houston	Route continues along Probandt Street north
6.3	10.1	South Alamo Street east	Route continues along South Alamo Street west
7.0	11.3	I-10 / I-35 / US 87 – El Paso, Austin	Northern terminus, continues as Frio Street
1.000 mi = 1.609 km; 1.000 km = 0.621 mi

== See also ==
- List of highways in San Antonio, Texas
- List of state highway spurs in Texas
