= I37 =

I37 or I-37 may refer to:

- Astrodomi Observatory, Tigre, Buenos Aires Province, Argentina
- Interstate 37, a highway in Texas, United States
- Japanese submarine I-37
