= Texas State Highway Loop 353 =

State highway in Texas

State Highway Loop 353
- Loop 353 highlighted in red

Route information
- Maintained by TxDOT
- Length: 7.875 mi (12.674 km)
- Existed: 1961–present

Major junctions
- South end: I-35 in San Antonio
- US 90 in San Antonio
- North end: I-10 / I-35 in San Antonio

Location
- Country: United States
- State: Texas
- Counties: Bexar

Highway system
- Highways in Texas; Interstate; US; State; Former; Toll; Loops; Spurs; FM/RM; Park; Rec
← Loop 352	→ Loop 354

Loop 353 is a 7.875-mile-long (12.674 km) loop route in the U.S. state of Texas that follows a former route of U.S. Route 81 (US 81) in southwestern San Antonio, while Loop 368 continues the route through northeast San Antonio. Loop 353 follows New Laredo Highway from Interstate 35 (I-35) on the southwest side of San Antonio towards the northeast and follows Nogalitos Street before ending at another point on I-35 just southwest of Downtown San Antonio. The road is still a major arterial for the city, providing access to Kelly USA.

== History ==
Loop 353 follows the original routing of US 81 on the southwest side of San Antonio. US 81 was first designated along this stretch in 1927 and is the basis of the naming of the road Laredo Highway due to US 81 passing through Laredo southwest of San Antonio. On September 19, 1961, when US 81 was rerouted onto the freeway to the east, the old segment was designated as Loop 353, but signed as Business US 81, until its decommissioning, which then became Loop 353 only, plus renaming the street New Laredo Highway. Loop 353 was proposed for decommissioning as part of TxDOT's San Antonio turnback proposal, which would have turned back over 129 miles of roadway to the city of San Antonio, but the city rejected that proposal.

== Route description ==
Loop 353 begins on the southwest side of San Antonio at I-35 just northeast of I-410 interchange. The loop heads northeast along New Laredo Highway, roughly paralleling the interstate for its entire routing. The road continues towards the northeast, intersecting Loop 13 (Military Drive). The highway is the southeast boundary and provides access to Kelly USA, the former Kelly Air Force Base. At an intersection with Zarzamora Street, the street name changes to Nogalitos Street. The highway continues to the northeast and has a junction with US 90 just prior to its northern terminus at I-10 and I-35.

== Junction list ==
The entire route is in San Antonio, Bexar County.

mi	km	Destinations	Notes
0.0	0.0	I-35 south	I-35 exit 145B
3.6	5.8	Loop 13 (Southwest Military Drive)	
7.4	11.9	US 90 west – Del Rio	Interchange
7.8	12.6	I-10 / I-35	I-35 exit 154A
1.000 mi = 1.609 km; 1.000 km = 0.621 mi
