= Texas State Highway Loop 13 =

State highway in Texas

State Highway Loop 13

Route information
- Maintained by TxDOT
- Length: 21.684 mi (34.897 km)
- Existed: Before 1939–present

Major junctions
- CCW end: US 90
- I-35; I-37 / US 281; US 87; I-10 / US 90
- CW end: I-410

Location
- Country: United States
- State: Texas
- Counties: Bexar

Highway system
- Highways in Texas; Interstate; US; State; Former; Toll; Loops; Spurs; FM/RM; Park; Rec
← SH 13	→ FM 13

Loop 13 is a 21.684-mile (34.897 km) partial loop route around the city of San Antonio in the U.S. state of Texas. Prior to I-410, Loop 13 served as the primary loop for the city. Part of the road was eventually turned into part of I-410. It follows Military Drive from US 90 through the south side of the city. It then follows W.W. White Road after it turns to the north through the east side of San Antonio before ending at I-410. The road is still a major arterial for the city, providing access to Lackland Air Force Base, Kelly USA, and Brooks City-Base.

== History ==
On January 18, 1937, The Military Loop from SH 2 to SH 16 in San Antonio was created. On May 24, 1938, the loop extended north to SH 3. On December 1, 1938, it was extended north to SH 2 again. On December 21, 1938, it was extended west to the rail overpass near Kelly Field. Loop 13 originally ran from the rail overpass near Kelly Field east through the south side of San Antonio, then turning towards the north to US 81 on the northeast side of the city on September 25, 1939. Prior to I-410, Loop 13 served as the primary loop for the city. On May 9, 1940, the loop had its western end extended to 0.186 miles west of the rail overpass. On November 24, 1941, the loop had its western end extended northward to a junction with US 90 on the west side of the city. On June 14, 1947, a 2.7 miles (4.3 km) extension on its eastern end, brought the loop back to the west to Military Road. On July 15, 1949, it was extended further from Military Road to US 281. The loop saw its final extension on June 25, 1952, an extension that completed the loop around the city. In the 1960s, the loop began to see its demise at the onset of the Interstate Highway System as it began to be replaced by I-410. On October 5, 1960, the section from US 90 on the west side of the city north to I-10 was transferred to I-410 and the section from I-10 eastward to US 81 along the city's northside was renumbered as Loop 410 to keep the numbering of I-410 intact despite this section not meeting Interstate standards at the time. On October 28, 1966, the section from I-35, formerly US 81, south to Seale Road became I-410, with the section from Seale Road south to US 90 was removed from the state highway system. But on January 24, 1978, this segment would later be readded to the highway bringing Loop 13 to its current alignment. Loop 13 was proposed for decommissioning in 2014 as part of TxDOT's San Antonio turnback proposal, which would have turned back over 129 miles of roads to the city of San Antonio, but the city of San Antonio rejected that proposal.

== Route description ==
Loop 13 begins on the west side of San Antonio at US 90 north of Lackland Air Force Base. The loop heads south along Military Drive, between two sections of Lackland, before turning towards the southeast. It turns towards the east at the intersection with FM 2536 at Old Pearsall Road, just before a crossing over Leon Creek and a Union Pacific rail yard. An intersection with Loop 353 (New Laredo Highway), which was the routing of US 81 when it still passed through town, provides access to Kelly USA. Loop 13 passes under I-35 as it heads east through the south side of the city. It intersects Spur 536 at Roosevelt Avenue, which provides access to Stinson Airport and Mission San Jose. The loop crosses over the San Antonio River just before a junction with Spur 122 at Presa Street. As it nears I-37, it passes nearby Brooks City-Base. At Spur 117, Loop 13 turns towards the north and begins following W.W. White Road. It intersects US 87 at Rigsby Avenue as it passes through the east side of San Antonio. It intersects FM 1346 at Houston Street and I-10 before ending at I-410 east of Fort Sam Houston.

== Junction list ==
The entire route is in San Antonio, Bexar County.

mi	km	Destinations	Notes
0.0	0.0	US 90 (Cleto Rodriguez Freeway) – Hondo, San Antonio	
3.7	6.0	FM 2536 west (Old Pearsall Road)	
5.6	9.0	Loop 353 (New Laredo Highway)	
7.6	12.2	I-35	I-35 exit 150B.
10.4	16.7	Spur 536 (Roosevelt Avenue) – Pleasanton	
11.6	18.7	Spur 122 south (Presa Street)	
13.6	21.9	I-37 / US 281	I-37 exit 135.
15.1	24.3	Spur 117 (W.W. White Road)	
17.8	28.6	US 87 (Rigsby Avenue) – San Antonio, La Vernia	
19.5	31.4	FM 1346 (Houston Street)	
20.0	32.2	I-10 / US 90 – San Antonio, Houston	I-10 exit 580.
21.1– 21.7	34.0– 34.9	I-35 / I-410 / FM 78	Interchange; I-410 south exit 31B.
1.000 mi = 1.609 km; 1.000 km = 0.621 mi
