= List of state highway spurs in Texas (500–9999) =

- Texas State Highway Spur marker

Highway names
- Interstates: Interstate Highway X (IH-X, I-X)
- US Highways: U.S. Highway X (US X)
- State: State Highway X (SH X)
- Loops: Loop X
- Spurs: Spur X
- Farm or Ranch to Market Roads: Farm to Market Road X (FM X); Ranch-to-Market Road X (RM X)
- Park Roads: Park Road X (PR X)

System links
- Highways in Texas; Interstate; US; State; Former; Toll; Loops; Spurs; FM/RM; Park; Rec

State highway spurs in Texas are owned and maintained by the Texas Department of Transportation (TxDOT).

== Spur 501 ==
State Highway Spur 501
- Location: Harris County
- Length: 1.480 mi (2.382 km)
- Existed: December 7, 1971–present

Spur 501 is located in Harris County. It runs from Bus. SH 146-D to South Shady Lane in La Porte.

Spur 501 was designated on December 7, 1971, from Loop 410 (now Bus. SH 146) at Avenue J to a point 2.5 miles (4.0 km) south along an old routing of SH 146. On July 28, 1977, a 1.1-mile (1.8 km) section from Loop 410 at Avenue J to Spur 498 was transferred to Loop 410 (later Bus. SH 146).

== Spur 502 ==
State Highway Spur 502
- Location: Gregg County
- Length: 7.319 mi (11.779 km)
- Existed: January 31, 1972–present

Spur 502 is located in Gregg County. It runs from US 80 in Longview north to US 259 near Judson. It is known as Judson Road for most of its length, except for the southernmost quarter mile, where it is known as High Street. Spur 502 was designated on January 31, 1972, on its current route.

Junction list

The entire route is in Gregg County.

Location	mi	km	Destinations	Notes
Longview			US 80 (Marshall Ave) – White Oak, Hallsville	
Longview			Loop 281 (Tomlinson Pkwy)	
Longview			Spur 63 south (McCann Rd)	
Judson			FM 1844	
			US 259 – Ore City, Longview	
1.000 mi = 1.609 km; 1.000 km = 0.621 mi

== Spur 503 ==
State Highway Spur 503
- Location: Grayson County
- Length: 3.556 mi (5.723 km)
- Existed: March 1, 1972–present

Spur 503 is located in Grayson County. It runs from US 75 to US 69.

Spur 503 was designated on March 1, 1972, from then-proposed US 75 south of Denison east 1.5 miles (2.4 km) to then-present US 75 (later Bus. US 75, now SH 91) along an old routing of US 75. On December 22, 1994, the road was extended to US 69, replacing a portion of Bus. US 75.

== Spur 504 ==
State Highway Spur 504
- Location: Deaf Smith County
- Existed: April 3, 1972–June 21, 1990

Spur 504 was located in Deaf Smith County. It was designated on April 3, 1972, from the New Mexico state line at Glenrio, east and north 0.61 miles (0.98 km) to I-40, along a portion of an old alignment of US 66. Spur 504 was cancelled on June 21, 1990, and transferred to Bus. I-40.

== Spur 510 ==
State Highway Spur 510
- Location: Clay County
- Length: 1.696 mi (2.729 km)
- Existed: August 31, 1972–present

Spur 510 is located in Clay County. It runs from US 82 to US 287 in Henrietta.

Spur 510 was designated on August 31, 1972, on the current route, which is a former routing of US 287.

== Spur 511 ==
State Highway Spur 511
- Location: Montague County
- Length: 1.087 mi (1.749 km)
- Existed: December 11, 1972–present

Spur 511 is located in Montague County. It runs from an intersection with SH 101 (formerly SH 114) and FM 1749 in Sunset south to US 81/US 287. It is a former routing of US 81/US 287.

Spur 511 was designated on December 11, 1972, on its current route.

== Spur 514 ==
State Highway Spur 514
- Location: Smith County
- Length: 1.500 mi (2.414 km)
- Existed: December 10, 1973–present

Spur 514 is located in Smith County. It runs from US 69 northwest of Tyler to Loop 323.

Spur 514 was designated on December 10, 1973, on the current route.

== Spur 515 ==
State Highway Spur 515
- Location: Grimes County
- Length: 0.834 mi (1,342 m)
- Existed: February 28, 1973–present

Spur 515 is located in Grimes County. It runs from Bus. SH 6 (former Loop 508) to SH 6/SH 105.

Spur 515 was designated on February 28, 1973, on the current route as a replacement of a section of SH 105.

== Spur 527 ==
State Highway Spur 527
- Location: Harris County
- Length: 0.863 mi (1,389 m)
- Existed: July 30, 1976–present

Spur 527 is located in Harris County. It runs from I-69/US 59 to Elgin Street. The route is unsigned.

Spur 527 was designated on July 30, 1976, on the current route, which was once the original routing of US 59 into Downtown Houston.

== Spur 529 ==
State Highway Spur 529
- Location: Fort Bend County
- Length: 2.860 mi (4.603 km)
- Existed: August 23, 1976–present

Spur 529 is located in Fort Bend County. It runs from I-69/US 59 to US 90 Alt./SH 36.

Spur 529 was designated on August 30, 1976, on the current route.

== Spur 535 ==
State Highway Spur 535
- Location: Kerr County
- Length: 1.200 mi (1.931 km)
- Existed: May 23, 1977–present

Spur 535 is located in Kerr County. It runs from SH 27, 2.3 miles (3.7 km) southeast of Kerrville, to a point 1.2 miles (1.9 km) northeast.

Spur 535 was designated on May 23, 1977, from SH 27, 1.4 miles (2.3 km) south of Kerrville, southeast 1.3 miles (2.1 km) to Kerrville Airport. On September 26, 1979, Spur 535 was relocated to its current location due to construction at the airport.

== Spur 536 ==
State Highway Spur 536
- Location: Bexar County
- Length: 7.038 mi (11.327 km)
- Existed: February 23, 1978–present

Spur 536 is located in Bexar County. It runs from I-10/I-35/US 87 to I-410/US 281.

Spur 536 was designated on February 23, 1978, on the current route along an old routing of US 281, which was rerouted onto I-37. Spur 536 was proposed for decommissioning in 2014 as part of a TxDOT turnback program, but the program was rejected.

== Spur 537 ==
State Highway Spur 537
- Location: Bexar County
- Existed: February 23, 1978–December 18, 2014

Spur 537 was located in San Antonio. It began at an intersection with I-410 and San Pedro Avenue in Uptown San Antonio, near North Star Mall. It followed San Pedro Avenue northbound until its terminus at the US 281 freeway, just west of the runways of San Antonio International Airport.

Spur 537 was designated on February 23, 1978, along with Spur 536, after US 281 was rerouted along the McAllister Freeway through the north side of San Antonio. The Spur 537 designation, along with those of several other routes in Bexar County, was cancelled on December 18, 2014; control was returned to the city of San Antonio as part of TxDOT's San Antonio turnback program, which gave 21.8 miles (35.1 km) of roads to the city. The cancellation occurred when the project along the road was completed.

== Spur 542 ==
State Highway Spur 542
- Location: Karnes County
- Existed: April 20, 1982–June 21, 1990

Spur 542 was located in Karnes County. It was designated on April 20, 1982, from Spur 259 (now Bus. US 181) east 1.2 miles (1.9 km) to SH 72 east of Kenedy along an old routing of SH 72. On June 21, 1990, Spur 542 was cancelled and transferred to Bus. SH 72.

== Spur 544 ==
State Highway Spur 544
- Location: Nueces County
- Length: 6.679 mi (10.749 km)
- Existed: June 18, 1996–present

Spur 544 is located in Nueces County. It runs from SH 44 to I-37 in Corpus Christi.

Spur 544 was designated on June 18, 1996, on the current route as a replacement of Bus. SH 44.

== Spur 548 ==
State Highway Spur 548
- Location: Harris County
- Length: 1.506 mi (2.424 km)
- Existed: September 26, 1984–present

Spur 548 is located in Harris County. It runs from IH 610 near Hardy Street to Crosstimbers Road. The route is an unsigned portion of the Hardy Toll Road.

Spur 548 was designated on September 26, 1984, on the current route.

== Spur 553 ==
State Highway Spur 553
- Location: Denton County
- Existed: May 25, 1986–November 18, 1999

Spur 553 was designated on May 25, 1986, from I-35E at Spine Road in Lewisville, west 2.5 miles (4.0 km) to Denton Tap Road. On May 31, 1995, the road was extended to SH 121 in Coppell and to SH 121/FM 2281 in Lewisville, forming a continuous route between Coppell and Lewisville. Spur 553 was cancelled on November 18, 1999, and became a portion of SH 121 when it was rerouted.

== Spur 557 ==
State Highway Spur 557
- Location: Kaufman County
- Length: 4.369 mi (7.031 km)
- Existed: August 18, 1987–present

Spur 557 is located in Kaufman County. It runs from I-20 south of Terrell to US 80.

Spur 557 was designated on August 18, 1987, on the current route along an old routing of I-20.

== Spur 559 ==
State Highway Spur 559
- Location: Dallas County
- Existed: January 28, 1987–June 25, 1991

Spur 559 was designated on January 28, 1987, from I-345 southeast 1.4 miles (2.3 km) to I-45 along an old routing of US 75. On June 25, 1991, Spur 559 was cancelled and returned to the city of Dallas. The route is now the Good-Latimer Expressway.

== Spur 563 ==
State Highway Spur 563
- Location: Ellis County
- Existed: January 28, 1987–June 21, 1990

Spur 563 was located in Ellis County. It was the former alignment of US 75 through Ennis. It is now Business I-45.

== Spur 565 ==
State Highway Spur 565
- Location: Navarro County
- Existed: January 28, 1987–June 21, 1990

Spur 565 was located in Corsicana. It is now Bus. US 287.

== Spur 572 ==
State Highway Spur 572
- Location: Panola County
- Length: 1.321 mi (2.126 km)
- Existed: October 28, 1987–present

Spur 572 is located in Panola County. It runs from Bus. US 59 to US 79/SH 149 in Carthage.

Spur 572 was designated on October 28, 1987, as a replacement for SH 149, which was rerouted along Loop 436 west of Carthage.

== Spur 575 ==
State Highway Spur 575
- Location: Garza County
- Length: 0.335 mi (539 m)
- Existed: December 21, 1988–present

Spur 575 is located in Garza County. It runs from US 84 and East 15th Street in Post to FM 651.

Spur 575 was designated on December 21, 1988, on the current route.

== Spur 576 ==
State Highway Spur 576
- Location: Upton County
- Length: 1.030 mi (1.658 km)
- Existed: August 30, 1988–present

Spur 576 is located in Upton County. It runs from US 67 in Rankin to SH 349.

Spur 576 was designated on August 30, 1988, on the current route.

== Spur 579 ==
State Highway Spur 579
- Location: Hill County
- Length: 1.524 mi (2.453 km)
- Existed: March 26, 1991–present

Spur 579 is located in Hill County. It runs from I-35 northeast of Hillsboro to SH 81.

Spur 579 was designated on March 26, 1991, on the current route.

== Spur 580 ==
State Highway Spur 580
- Location: Tarrant County
- Length: 5.395 mi (8.682 km)
- Existed: August 28, 1991–present

Spur 580 is located in Tarrant County. It runs from US 377 to I-30 in Fort Worth.

Spur 580 was designated on August 28, 1991, on the current route along an old routing of US 80.

== Spur 581 ==
State Highway Spur 581
- Location: Frio County
- Length: 7.829 mi (12.600 km)
- Existed: March 26, 1991–present

Spur 581 is located in Frio County. It begins at I-35/FM 1583 in Derby. The highway runs to the north, paralleling both I-35 and a line of the Missouri Pacific Railroad, crossing the rail line north of Derby near County Road 3410. South of County Road 3201, Spur 581 passes by McKinley Field before entering Pearsall. Just north of the Pearsall city limits, the highway intersects FM 1582. Spur 581 runs north through town on Oak Street before ending at an intersection with Business I-35/FM 140 near the town square.

Spur 581 was designated on March 26, 1991, along the current route. Its mileage was transferred from US 81 when that highway was decommissioned south of Fort Worth.

== Spur 588 ==
State Highway Spur 588
- Location: Ector and Midland counties
- Length: 2.212 mi (3.560 km)
- Existed: April 26, 1989–present

Spur 588 is located in Ector and Midland counties. It runs from SH 191 to I-20 Business.

Spur 588 was designated on April 26, 1989, on the current route.

== Spur 589 ==
State Highway Spur 589
- Location: Live Oak County
- Existed: March 28, 1989–June 21, 1990

Spur 589 was designated om March 28, 1989, from US 281 to US 59 in George West along an old routing of US 59. On June 21, 1990, Spur 589 was cancelled and transferred to Bus. US 59.

== Spur 591 ==
State Highway Spur 591
- Location: Potter County
- Length: 1.506 mi (2.424 km)
- Existed: October 27, 1989–present

Spur 591 is located in Potter County. It runs from Loop 335 to Folsom Road in Amarillo.

Spur 591 was designated on October 27, 1989, on the current route.

== Spur 594 ==
State Highway Spur 594
- Location: Bowie County
- Length: 0.527 mi (848 m)
- Existed: January 26, 2006–present

Spur 594 is located in Bowie County. It runs from I-30, 1.4 miles (2.3 km) west of FM 560, to US 82 and serves the Red River Army Depot.

Spur 594 was designated on January 26, 2006, on the current route.

== Spur 600 ==
State Highway Spur 600
- Location: Hidalgo County
- Length: 1.506 mi (2.424 km)
- Existed: April 27, 1995–present

Spur 600 is located in Hidalgo County. It runs from US 281 and US 281 Spur in Pharr south to the Pharr Texas Port of Entry at the Pharr–Reynosa International Bridge.

Spur 600 was designated on April 27, 1995, on the current route.

== Spur 601 ==
State Highway Spur 601
- Location: El Paso County
- Length: 7.500 mi (12.070 km)
- Existed: August 24, 2006–present

Spur 601 is located in El Paso County. It runs from US 54 to Loop 375.

Spur 601 was designated on August 24, 2006, on the current route.

== Spur 729 ==
State Highway Spur 729
- Location: King County
- Length: 0.200 mi (322 m)
- Existed: July 26, 2007–present

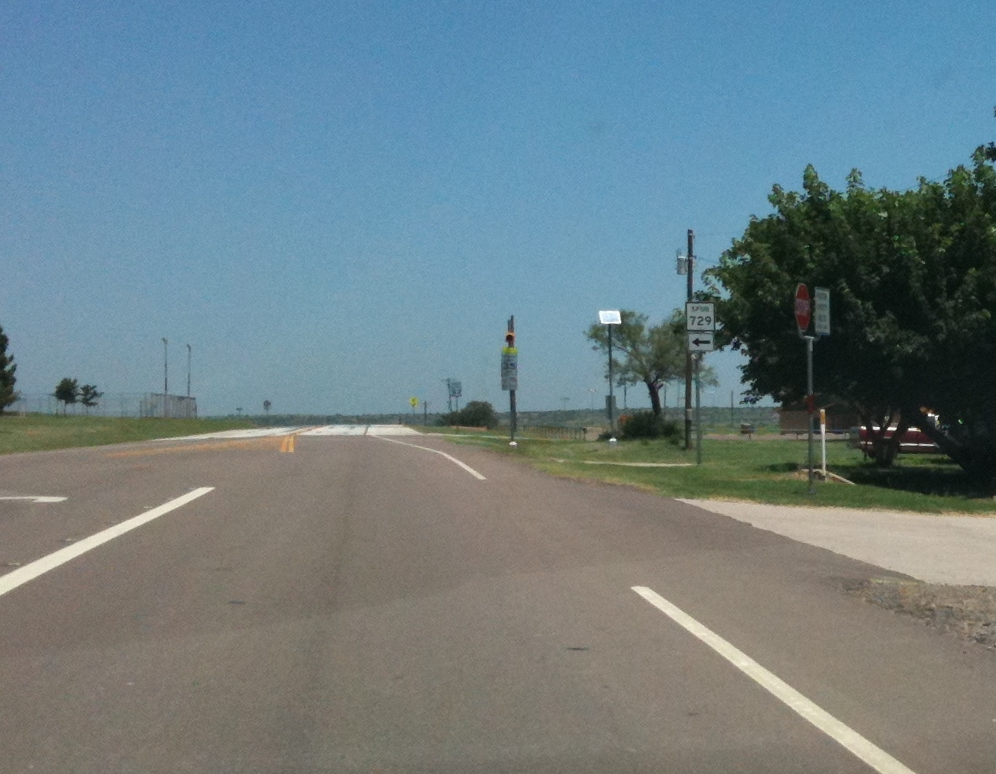
Eastern terminus of Spur 729 as viewed from northbound US 83

Spur 729 is located in Guthrie in King County. Its eastern terminus is at an at-grade intersection with US 83 near the buildings of the Guthrie Common School District. The short route travels to the west along 6th Street, ending at a barricaded dead end.

Spur 729 was designated on July 26, 2007, after TxDOT rerouted US 82/SH 114 around Guthrie. Originally, US 82 entered Guthrie from the west and was duplexed with US 83 southbound for approximately 1 mile (1.6 km) before the two routes separated past the South Wichita River bridge. The concurrency was eliminated with the construction of the US 82 bypass to the west of Guthrie and the upgrading of the southern intersection of the two highways to an interchange. Spur 729 is a section of the former US 82 into Guthrie, while the remaining portion of the former route was deleted from the state highway system.

Previously, the roadway extended beyond the current western terminus and functioned as a ramp to westbound US 82; this ramp was eventually obliterated, as originally proposed by TxDOT to AASHTO, though its footprint is still visible past the barricades and fencing.

== Spur 1966 ==
State Highway Spur 1966
- Location: El Paso County
- Length: 0.300 mi (483 m)
- Existed: March 29, 2012–present

Spur 1966 is located in El Paso County. It runs from US 85 to Schuster Avenue.

Spur 1966 was designated on February 23, 2012 as Spur 73, but because the number was already in use, it was changed to Spur 1966 on March 29, 2012. The number was chosen to honor the NCAA championship won by the 1965–66 Texas Western Miners men's basketball team as the road passes the university (now known as University of Texas at El Paso).
