= Farm to Market Road 2696 =

Road in Texas, United States

Farm to Market Road 2696
- Blanco Road

Route information
- Maintained by TxDOT
- Length: 16.028 mi (25.795 km)
- Existed: 1961–present

Major junctions
- South end: I-410 in San Antonio
- Loop 1604
- North end: San Antonio city limits

Location
- Country: United States
- State: Texas
- Counties: Bexar

Highway system
- Highways in Texas; Interstate; US; State; Former; Toll; Loops; Spurs; FM/RM; Park; Rec
← FM 2695	→ FM 2697

Farm to Market Road 2696 (FM 2696) is a 16-mile (26 km) farm to market road in Bexar County, Texas. It is known in Greater San Antonio as Blanco Road, a major north–south thoroughfare.

== Route description ==
FM 2696 begins at Interstate 410 at the western fringe of Uptown San Antonio, just east of Castle Hills. The route travels north through north central San Antonio, crossing Wurzbach Parkway and Loop 1604. It then runs along the eastern edge of the Camp Bullis Military Training Reservation. The FM 2696 designation ends at the San Antonio city limit south of the Comal County line. Blanco Road itself continues under Comal County maintenance to an intersection with SH 46 in Bulverde.

== History ==
FM 2696 was designated on March 22, 1961, from Loop 410 (now Interstate 410) northward 8.6 miles (13.8 km) to the Camp Bullis Entrance. FM 2696 was extended north three times: by 3.2 miles (5.1 km) on September 29, 1977, 1.9 miles (3.1 km) on October 21, 1981, and 2.1 miles (3.4 km) to near the Comal County line on October 26, 1983. The segment between I-410 and Loop 1604 was officially changed to Urban Road 2696 (UR 2696) on June 27, 1995. The designation reverted to FM 2696 with the elimination of the Urban Road system on November 15, 2018.

On December 18, 2014, the northernmost 6.2 miles (10.0 km) of the route, from the San Antonio city limit near Calico Landing to the Comal County line, was removed from the state highway system and returned to Bexar County. A previous turnback proposal would have decommissioned the entirety of FM 2696, but it was rejected by San Antonio city officials. The city instead passed a different proposal, which also resulted in the turnback of many other highways, on the day that FM 2696 was truncated.

As part of the Loop 1604 reconstruction project in northern San Antonio which began in 2021, the connection between FM 2696 and Loop 1604 is being converted to a diverging diamond interchange.

== Major intersections ==
The entire route is in San Antonio, Bexar County.

mi	km	Destinations	Notes
0.00	0.00	I-410 (Connally Loop)	Southern terminus; I-410 east exit 19, west exit 20A; road continues as Blanco Road
2.8	4.5	PA 1502 (Wurzbach Parkway)	
6.6	10.6	Loop 1604 (Anderson Loop)	
10.2	16.4	Blanco Road north	Continuation beyond San Antonio city limits
1.000 mi = 1.609 km; 1.000 km = 0.621 mi
