= Texas State Highway Spur 122 =

State highway in Texas

State Highway Spur 122
- Spur 122 highlighted in red

Route information
- Maintained by TxDOT
- Length: 5.664 mi (9.115 km)
- Existed: 1964–present

Major junctions
- South end: US 181 in San Antonio
- I-37 in San Antonio; I-410 / US 281 in San Antonio
- North end: Loop 13 in San Antonio

Location
- Country: United States
- State: Texas
- Counties: Bexar

Highway system
- Highways in Texas; Interstate; US; State; Former; Toll; Loops; Spurs; FM/RM; Park; Rec
← Loop 121	→ Loop 123

Spur 122 is a 5.664-mile (9.115 km) spur route in the U.S. state of Texas that follows a former route of U.S. Highway 181 (US 181) in San Antonio. Spur 122 follows Presa Street from US 181 near the city limits on the southeast side of San Antonio towards the northwest ending at Loop 13 just east of the San Antonio River. The spur provides access to Mission San Francisco de la Espada and other parks along the banks of the San Antonio River.

== History ==
An earlier Route, also named Spur 122, was designated on July 1, 1941, from U.S. Highway 60 to SH 86 in Bovina. On January 14, 1952, Spur 122 was cancelled and transferred to FM 1731. Spur 122 was reused on June 4, 1964, from I-37 to US 181. On January 29, 1974, this became part of US 181, and the old route of US 181 became new Spur 122. Spur 122 follows the original routing of U.S. Highway 181 on the southeast side of San Antonio. US 181 was first designated along this stretch in 1927. In 1974, when US 181 was shortened to Interstate 37 (I-37), the old segment was redesignated as Spur 122. Spur 122 was proposed for decommissioning in 2014 as part of TxDOT's San Antonio turnback proposal, which would have turned back over 129 miles of roads to the city of San Antonio, but the city of San Antonio rejected that proposal.

== Route description ==
Spur 122 begins near the city limits on the southeast side of San Antonio at US 181. The spur heads northwest along Presa Street passing under I-37. The road continues towards the northwest passing over I-410 before turning towards the north to parallel the San Antonio River to its west. This portion of the San Antonio River has several parks along its banks to include the Acequia Park, Espada Park and the Mission San Francisco de la Espada. The highway also passes near the western boundary of Brooks City-Base, a former U.S. Air Force installation. The spur ends at an intersection with Loop 13 (Military Drive).

== Junction list ==
The entire route is in San Antonio, Bexar County.

mi	km	Destinations	Notes
		US 181 to I-37 north	Southern terminus; access to I-37 north via US 181 north
		I-37 south	I-37 exit 132 (northbound only); no northbound entrance
		I-410 / US 281 / SH 130	I-410 exit 42
		Loop 13 (Military Drive)	Northern Terminus, continues as South Presa Street
1.000 mi = 1.609 km; 1.000 km = 0.621 mi: Incomplete access
