= Wurzbach Parkway =

US Texan road

Wurzbach Parkway
- Principal Arterial State System 1502
- Wurzbach Parkway highlighted in red

Route information
- Maintained by TxDOT
- Length: 9.8 mi (15.8 km)

Major junctions
- West end: Lockhill–Selma Road in San Antonio
- FM 1535 in San Antonio; FM 2696 in San Antonio; US 281 in San Antonio; FM 2252 in San Antonio
- East end: O'Connor Road in San Antonio

Location
- Country: United States
- State: Texas
- Counties: Bexar

Highway system
- Highways in Texas; Interstate; US; State; Former; Toll; Loops; Spurs; FM/RM; Park; Rec

Wurzbach Parkway is a part freeway and part major arterial road (classified as a "super-arterial") in San Antonio, Texas, built to provide relief on Interstate 410 (Loop 410) and Loop 1604 on the city's north side. The highway's western third was built as an expressway with six at-grade intersections and the remainder as a freeway. The opening in September 2015 of an interchange with U.S. Highway 281 (US 281) completed primary construction of the parkway. The highway is maintained by the Texas Department of Transportation, and was developed and maintained under the now-defunct Principal Arterial State System (PASS) program, under which it was designated as PA 1502. The parkway includes an interchange with US 281, and drivers can access I-10 and I-35 via local roads that extend the parkway.

Wurzbach Parkway is an extension of Wurzbach Road, which was named for William Wurzbach, who owned a large ranch around what is now I‑10 and Wurzbach Road. A road he built through his property to Fredericksburg Road was eventually deeded to the county, which then named it after him.

== Route description ==
The west portion of the parkway is a limited-access surface road that connects Lockhill–Selma Road to West Avenue, crossing Blanco Road (FM 2696) with an interchange, and Military Highway (Farm to Market Road 1535, FM 1535) at-grade. Wurzbach Road continues southwest from Lockhill-Selma Road, crossing I-10 at exit 561. The area between West Avenue and Wetmore Road includes an interchange with US 281. From Wetmore Road, on the northeast side of the San Antonio International Airport, the parkway continues east beyond Thousand Oaks Drive. At the east end are several at-grade intersections before the parkway ends at O'Connor Road and Crosswinds Way; O'Connor Road leads southeast to I-35 at exit 169.

== History ==
Planners conceived the parkway in the mid-1980s as the East–West Parkway, an extension of the existing Wurzbach Road, to relieve traffic on I-410. The road, estimated to cost $90 million, was approved by the Texas Transportation Commission in 1988, to be built by the state but funded in part by the City of San Antonio. Construction began in mid-1994 on the section between Wetmore Road and Nacogdoches Road and opened in July 1996. The eastern portion of the roadway opened on August 26, 1999, allowing traffic to bypass I-410. The west section was opened on July 24, 2002; its fourth section opened on December 23, 2013. In September 2015, the central stretch of the parkway opened to traffic, effectively completing the project after 21 years.

The Alamo Regional Mobility Authority (RMA) conducted a supplemental environmental assessment on the entire corridor from Lockhill–Selma Road to I-35, emphasizing the segment that had not been constructed. The EA supplemented the EA completed several years prior to initial construction. The Alamo RMA considered three alternatives for the interchange with US 281. The first alternative was a Wurzbach Parkway bridge over US 281 with no direct connection between the two highways, but with access via the highway's two frontage roads (this option was chosen). The second option would have included an elevated roundabout interchange to provide direct access between the highways. The final alternative would have involved main lane to main lane connector ramps from Wurzbach Parkway to US 281 and loop ramps for access from US 281 to Wurzbach Parkway.

According to the San Antonio Express-News, the Texas Transportation Commission reviewed the parkway expansion on November 19, 2009. The project was funded by proceeds from Proposition 12 bonds approved by voters in 2007, a package which was voted on by commissioners. Clay Smith, TxDOT's San Antonio District planning engineer, said the Wurzbach Parkway project would get $126 million under the bond-financing plan, enough for TxDOT to finish the three final segments left on the parkway. The expansion construction was completed in two phases: the first from Blanco Road to West Avenue and from Jones Maltsberger Road to Wetmore; the second between West Avenue and Jones Maltsberger.

The parkway has no ramps that connect directly to I-35 to the east (only allowing drivers to use O'Connor Road that leads to the parkway), and there are no plans for Wurzbach Parkway to extend to I-10 to the west (only allowing drivers to use the Wurzbach Road exit to connect to the parkway).

A project completed in 2022 reworked the parkway's intersections at NW Military Highway and Lockhill-Selma Road to ease congestion at the NW Military intersection. Initial proposals would have built a Single Point Urban Interchange (SPUI) at Military with an underpass for Wurzbach, but neighborhood opposition to that plan scuttled it, resulting in the revised plan that made improvements to the at-grade intersection.

== Major junctions ==
The entire route is in San Antonio, Bexar County.

mi	km	Destinations	Notes
0.00	0.00	Lockhill-Selma Road	Western terminus; road continues southwest as Wurzbach Road
0.5	0.80	FM 1535 (Northwest Military Highway)	
1.5	2.4	FM 2696 (Blanco Road)	West end of limited-access segment
2.1	3.4	Vista del Norte Drive	No eastbound access to/from Visita del Norte Drive north, no westbound exit to Vista del Norte Drive south
2.7	4.3	West Avenue	
3.2	5.1	US 281	
4.5	7.2	Jones-Maltsberger Road	East end of limited-access segment
5.7	9.2	Starcrest Drive	Interchange; access to Skyplace FBO at San Antonio International Airport
6.8	10.9	Wetmore Road	West end of limited-access segment
7.8	12.6	Nacogdoches Road	Eastbound entrance ramp has direct access to/from Perrin Central Boulevard
8.6	13.8	FM 2252 (Perrin-Beitel Road)	
9.2	14.8	Tool Yard – Heroes Stadium	Right-in/right-out interchange
9.5	15.3	Thousand Oaks Drive	
10.4	16.7	Turnaround	East end of limited access segment; eastbound exit and westbound entrance
11.3	18.2	O'Connor Road / Crosswinds Way	Eastern terminus; road continues south as O'Connor Rd.
1.000 mi = 1.609 km; 1.000 km = 0.621 mi: Incomplete access
