= Judson, Texas =

Unincorporated community in Texas, US

Coordinates: 32°34′58″N 94°45′13″W

Judson is an unincorporated community in Gregg County, Texas, United States. According to the Handbook of Texas, the community had an estimated population of 650 in 2000. It is part of the Longview, Texas Metropolitan Statistical Area.

Judson is located along Spur 502 (Judson Rd) in northern Gregg County, several miles north of Longview.

Judson has a post office with the ZIP code 75660. Public education in the community is provided by the Longview Independent School District.

== Climate ==
The climate in this area is characterized by hot, humid summers and generally mild to cool winters. According to the Köppen Climate Classification system, Judson has a humid subtropical climate, abbreviated "Cfa" on climate maps.
