= Texas State Highway Loop 368 =

State highway loop in Bexar County, Texas, United States

State Highway Loop 368
- Loop 368 highlighted in red

Route information
- Maintained by TxDOT
- Length: 8.115 mi (13.060 km)
- Existed: 1962–present

Major junctions
- South end: I-35 in San Antonio
- North end: I-410 in Fratt

Location
- Country: United States
- State: Texas
- Counties: Bexar

Highway system
- Highways in Texas; Interstate; US; State; Former; Toll; Loops; Spurs; FM/RM; Park; Rec
← Loop 367	→ Loop 369

Loop 368 is a state highway loop in the U.S. state of Texas that follows a former route of US 81 in San Antonio. 8.115 miles (13.060 km) in length, the route is a major arterial in the city, providing access to Brackenridge Park, the San Antonio Zoo, and the University of the Incarnate Word.

== Route description ==
Loop 368 begins northeast of Downtown San Antonio at I-35 near that route's interchange with I-37 and US 281. It heads northeast along Broadway through Midtown San Antonio, and through the cities of Alamo Heights and Terrell Hills. At an intersection with Austin Highway, Loop 368 turns onto that roadway. The highway continues to the northeast to its northern terminus at the interchange of I-35 and I-410.

== History ==
Loop 368 follows the original routing of US 81 on the northeast side of San Antonio. US 81 was first designated along this stretch in 1927 and is the basis of the name Austin Highway, as US 81 was the primary route from San Antonio to Austin at the time. On August 1, 1962, when US 81 was rerouted onto the freeway to the east, the old segment was designated as Loop 368, but signed as Business U.S. 81. The route was signed as Loop 368 after US 81 was decommissioned south of Fort Worth in 1991.

On December 18, 2014, the section from Burr Road in Alamo Heights to I-35 was planned to be removed from the state highway system as part of TxDOT's San Antonio turnback program, which gave 21.8 miles (35.1 km) of roads to the city. The original proposal would have turned back over 129 miles (208 km) to the city, and would have also decommissioned the section of Loop 368 from the McNay Art Museum entrance northeast of New Braunfels Avenue to I-35, but the city rejected that proposal. The turnback of the Burr Road to I-35 section was to have occurred upon the issuance of the project acceptance letter for the improvements along that section. However, on January 27, 2022, TxDOT announced that it would retain jurisdiction over that portion of Loop 368, noting that the city did not provide the required acceptance letter for the project.

Under the leadership of mayor Ron Nirenberg, the city of San Antonio tried to add Protected bike lanes and narrowing the existing lanes on Broadway along with lowering the speed limits, but the Texas Department of Transportation did not allow that. Nirenberg accused the state DoT of "1950s thinking" and having a "religious fascination" with highway expansion.

== Junction list ==
The entire route is in San Antonio, Bexar County.

mi	km	Destinations	Notes
0.0	0.0	I-35 / Newell Avenue, Casa Blanca Street	Southern terminus; 1-35 north exit 158, south exit 158C
5.1	8.2	Harry Wurzbach Road	Interchange
8.1	13.0	I-410 / I-35 south / Fratt Road	Northern terminus; I-410 west exit 26, east exit 26A
1.000 mi = 1.609 km; 1.000 km = 0.621 mi

== See also ==
- List of state highway loops in Texas
