= Astrodomi Observatory =

Observatory in Buenos Aires Province, Argentina

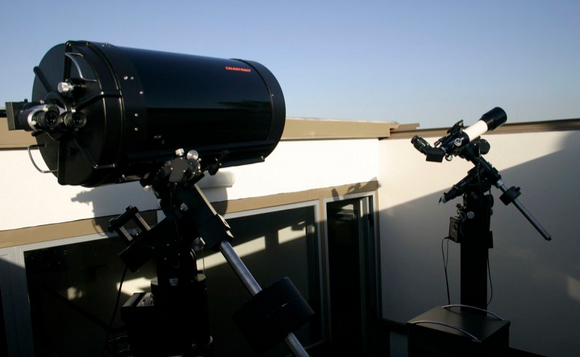
- Observatory code: I37
- Location: Buenos Aires Province
- Coordinates: 34°26′24″S 58°38′50″W

Astrodomi observatory is an astronomical observatory located in Tigre, Buenos Aires Province, Argentina. It has observatory code I37.

== See also ==
- List of astronomical observatories
- Lists of telescopes
