= Interstate 410 =

Interstate Highway in Texas, United States

Interstate 410
- Connally Loop
- I-410 highlighted in red

Route information
- Auxiliary route of I-10
- Maintained by TxDOT
- Length: 49.488 mi (79.643 km)
- Existed: 1959–present
- NHS: Entire route

Major junctions
- Beltway around San Antonio
- I-10 in San Antonio; US 87 in San Antonio; US 90 in San Antonio; US 281 in San Antonio; I-35 in San Antonio; I-37 in San Antonio; SH 151 in San Antonio

Location
- Country: United States
- State: Texas
- County: Bexar

Highway system
- Interstate Highway System; Main; Auxiliary; Suffixed; Business; Future; Highways in Texas; Interstate; US; State; Former; Toll; Loops; Spurs; FM/RM; Park; Rec
← I-345	→ I-610

Interstate 410 (I-410 (Note: Some sources use "IH-410", as "IH" is an abbreviation used by the Texas Department of Transportation (TxDOT) for Interstate Highways.)), colloquially Loop 410, is an auxiliary route of I-10 around San Antonio, Texas. It is identified as the Connally Loop in honor of former Texas Governor John Connally.

== Route description ==
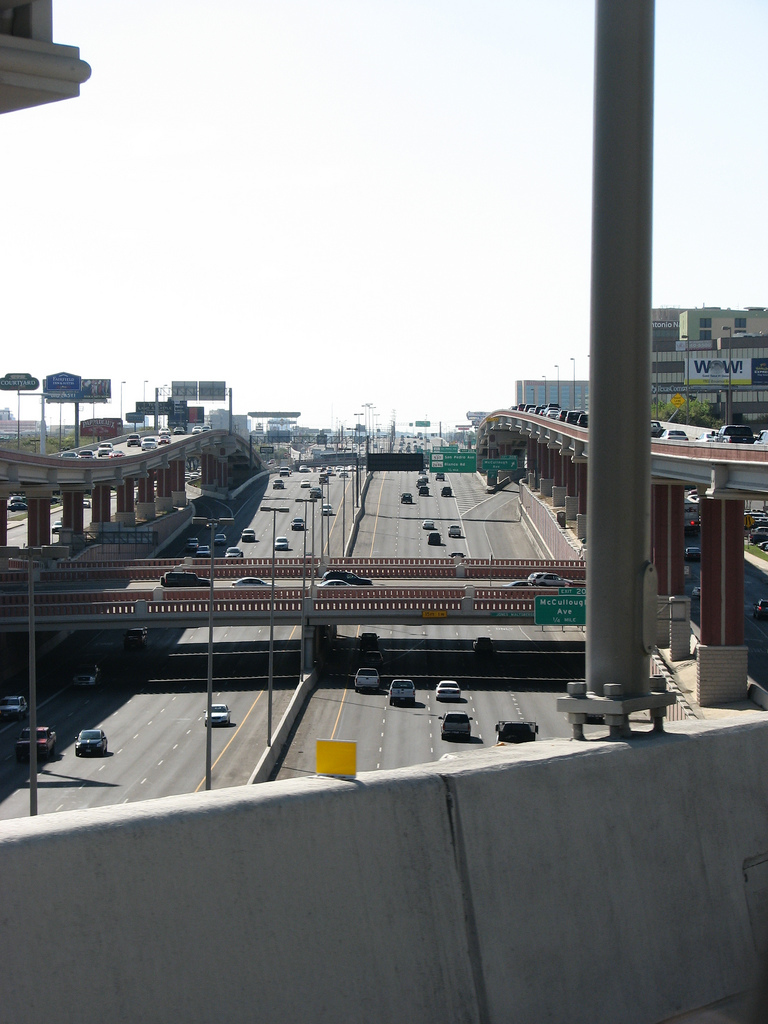
I-410 near the I-410/US 281 interchange in uptown San Antonio

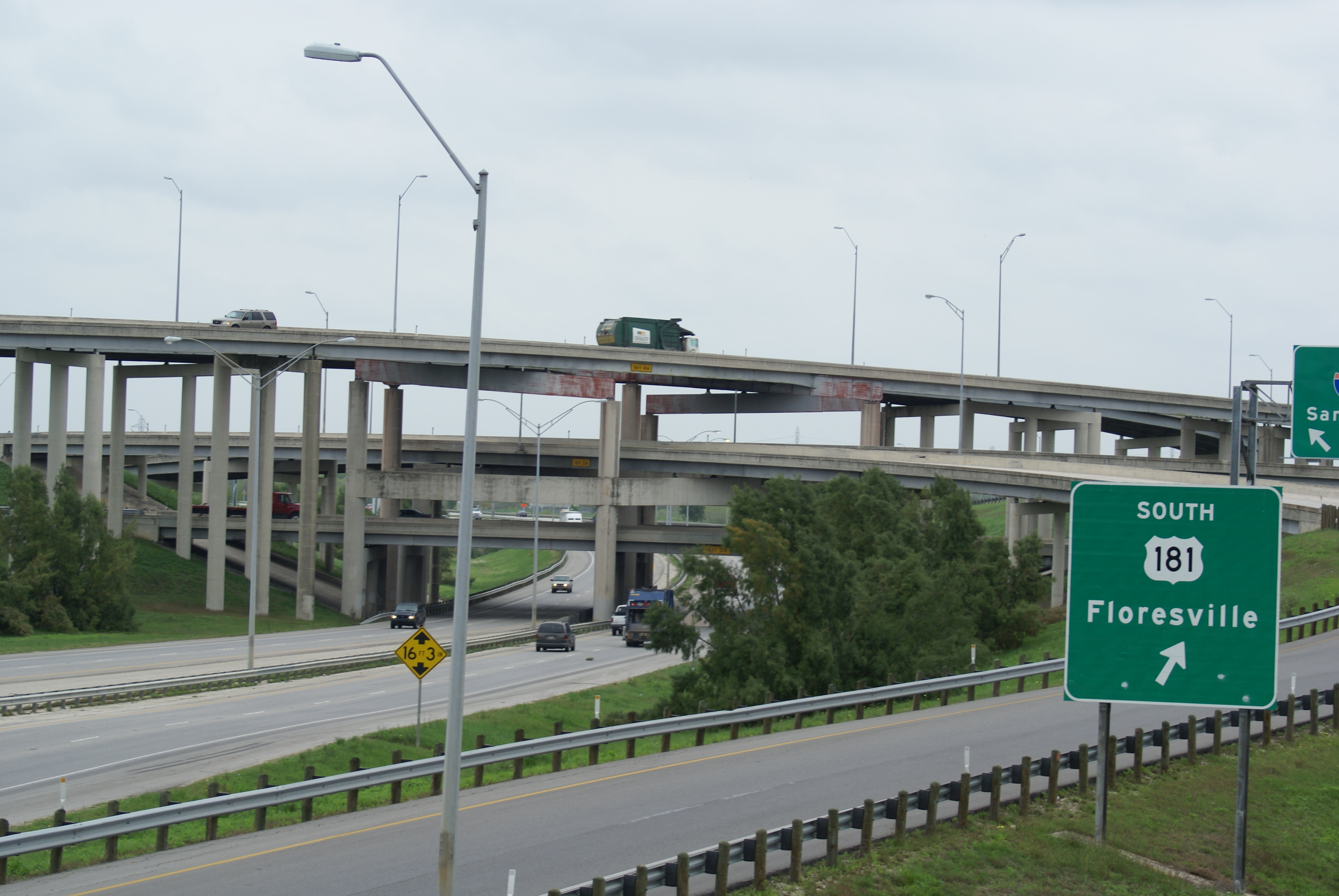
I-410's interchange with I-37 on the southeast side of San Antonio

I-410 circumnavigates the city of San Antonio, officially beginning and ending at the junction with I-35 on the southwest side of the loop. There are vast differences between the northern arc and southern arc of the loop. The northern arc serves the heavily urbanized portions of San Antonio and is currently being widened to as many as five lanes in each direction. The southern arc resembles more of a rural Interstate as it transverses, for the most part, undeveloped portions of San Antonio as a four-lane Interstate. I-410 intersects I-10 twice, I-35 twice, I-37 once, as well as U.S. Highway 90 (US 90), US 281, and State Highway 151 (SH 151), all freeways in Greater San Antonio with the exception of Loop 1604, which forms a secondary loop around the city, and Wurzbach Parkway, which is located about two miles (3.2 km) outside the loop on the north side. I-410 serves San Antonio International Airport, Lackland Air Force Base, Fort Sam Houston, the South Texas Medical Center, Southwest Research Institute, and Toyota Motor Manufacturing Texas.

== History ==
Like most cities in Texas, San Antonio was served by a loop around the city long before the arrival of the Interstate Highway System. Loop 13, although not a freeway, served in this role up until the 1950s, when many of San Antonio's freeways were constructed. The northern half of Loop 13 followed the current path of I-410 while the southern half still exists on the south side of San Antonio. Much of the freeway was proposed during the mid-1950s with construction beginning on the northwest portion of the loop near I-10. On October 15, 1960, Loop 13 from I-10 to I-35 was redesignated as Loop 410 for continuity purposes. By 1961, the freeway had been completed from I-35 on the southwest side to just east of US 281 near the airport, where it continued once to the east as a four-lane highway to I-35. By 1964, the southern arc had been extended eastward from I-35 to Roosevelt Avenue and was under construction from Roosevelt Avenue to I-35 on the east side of the city. By 1967, the eastern arc had been completed to Interstate Highway standards, and the remaining portion from US 281 to I-35 on the city's north side had been completely built to Interstate Highway standards but still carried the Loop 410 designation until July 31, 1969, when it officially became I-410.

Due to the city growing primarily to the north, I-410 required widening along this stretch. It was expanded to six lanes in the late 1970s and early 1980s from Ingram Road to I-35 north. It was further expanded to six lanes from Ingram Road to Valley Hi Road in 1987. An additional westbound lane was added from I-10 west to Babcock Road in 1996.

I-410 was widened from the late 1990s through early 2010s along its entire northern arc from Culebra Road to Austin Highway, with five lanes each way and interchange reconstructions at I-10 and San Pedro Avenue, and an entire new interchange at US 281, officially called the "San Antonio Web".

== Exit list ==
Exit numbers correspond to mileage from the south junction with I-35. The entire route is in Bexar County.

Location	mi	km	Exit	Destinations	Notes
San Antonio	0.75	1.21	1	Frontage Road	
San Antonio	1.88	3.03	2	FM 2536 (Old Pearsall Road)	
San Antonio	3.47	5.58	3A	Ray Ellison Boulevard	Signed as exit 3 northbound
San Antonio	4.23	6.81	3B	Medina Base Road	Northbound exit is via exit 3
San Antonio	4.93	7.93	4	Valley Hi Drive – Lackland AFB	
San Antonio	6.18	9.95	6	US 90 (Cleto Rodriguez Freeway) – San Antonio, Del Rio	
San Antonio	7.61	12.25	7	Marbach Road	
San Antonio	8.80	14.16	9A	SH 151 (Stotzer Freeway) – SeaWorld	Signed as exit 9 northbound
San Antonio	9.51	15.30	9B	West Military Drive	Southbound exit and northbound entrance
San Antonio	10.41	16.75	10	Culebra Road	Former FM 3487
San Antonio	11.53	18.56	11	Ingram Road	
San Antonio	12.84	20.66	12	Exchange Parkway	Southbound exit and entrance
San Antonio	13.16	21.18	13A	SH 16 north / Spur 421 (Bandera Road) – Leon Valley, San Antonio	North end of SH 16 concurrency; signed as exits 13A and 13B (north) westbound; signed as exit 13 eastbound
San Antonio	13.62	21.92	13B	Evers Road	Eastbound exit is via exit 13; westbound exit and eastbound entrance; westbound is via exit 14A
San Antonio	14.30	23.01	14A	Summit Parkway	Westbound exit and entrance
San Antonio	14.80	23.82	14B	Callaghan Road	Signed as exit 14 eastbound
San Antonio	15.21	24.48	14C	Babcock Road	Eastbound exit is via exit 14, access to South Texas Medical Center
San Antonio	16.08	25.88	15	Loop 345 (Fredericksburg Road) – Balcones Heights	Access to South Texas Medical Center and Methodist Texan Hospital
San Antonio	16.69	26.86	16	I-10 / US 87 (McDermott Freeway) – San Antonio, El Paso	I-10 exit 564; 5-level stack interchange
San Antonio	17.19	27.66	17A	Cherry Ridge Drive	Eastbound exit and westbound entrance, westbound exit is via exit 17
San Antonio	17.82	28.68	17B	Vance Jackson Road	Signed as exit 17 westbound
Castle Hills	18.37– 18.50	29.56– 29.77	18	Jackson-Keller Road, West Avenue	
Castle Hills	18.92	30.45	19A	Honeysuckle Lane	Eastbound exit is via exit 18
Castle Hills	19.34	31.12	19B	FM 1535 (Military Highway) – Castle Hills	Signed as exit 19 eastbound
Castle Hills	19.70	31.70	19	FM 2696 (Blanco Road)	Westbound exit is via exit 20A
San Antonio	20.15	32.43	20A	Spur 537 north (San Pedro Avenue)	Signed as exit 20 eastbound
San Antonio	20.60	33.15	20B	McCullough Avenue	Eastbound exit is via exit 20
San Antonio	21.31	34.30	21A	US 281 (McAlister Freeway) – Johnson City, Downtown	"San Antonio Web", fully opened June 9, 2008
San Antonio	21.49– 21.96	34.58– 35.34	21	Airport Boulevard, Wetmore Road – Int'l Airport	Signed as exit 21B eastbound
San Antonio	22.27	35.84	22	Broadway Street	No eastbound entrance
San Antonio	23.02	37.05	23	Nacogdoches Road	No westbound entrance, westbound exit is via exit 24
San Antonio	23.83	38.35	24	Harry Wurzbach Road – Fort Sam Houston	
San Antonio	24.78	39.88	25A	Starcrest Drive	Signed as exit 25 eastbound, access to Northeast Baptist Hospital
San Antonio	25.49	41.02	25B	FM 2252 (Perrin-Beitel Road)	Eastbound exit is via exit 25
San Antonio	25.98	41.81	26A	Loop 368 south – Alamo Heights	Signed as exit 26 westbound; Loop 368 was formerly US 81 Business
San Antonio	26.50	42.65	26B	Interchange Parkway, Perrin Creek Drive	Eastbound exit and westbound entrance
San Antonio	26.60	42.81	27	I-35 north (Pan Am Expressway) – Austin	North end of I-35 concurrency; signed as exit 166 northbound; freeway assumes I-35's exit numbers
San Antonio	26.70	42.97	166A	Randolph Boulevard – Windcrest	Northbound exit and westbound entrance
San Antonio	27.22	43.81	165	FM 1976 (Walzem Road)	
San Antonio	28.19	45.37	164B	Eisenhauer Road	
San Antonio	29.82	47.99	163	I-35 south (Pan Am Expressway) – Downtown	South end of I-35 concurrency; southbound exit and northbound entrance
San Antonio	29.07	46.78	30	Rittiman Road, Space Center Drive	Northbound exit and entrance
San Antonio	30.71	49.42	30	Binz-Engleman Road	Southbound exit and northbound entrance
San Antonio	30.77	49.52	31A	FM 78 – Kirby	Signed as exit 32 northbound
San Antonio	31.35	50.45	31	I-35 south (Pan Am Expressway) / Binz-Engleman Road – San Antonio	Northbound left exit and southbound entrance
San Antonio	31.58	50.82	31B	Loop 13 (W.W. White Road)	No northbound exit
San Antonio	32.35	52.06	32	Dietrich Road	Southbound exit only
San Antonio	32.79	52.77	33	I-10 (Lopez Freeway) / US 90 / SH 130 north – Downtown San Antonio, Seguin, Texas Houston	North end of SH 130 concurrency; I-10 exit 581; cloverleaf, to be replaced by 5-level stack interchange
San Antonio	33.66	54.17	34	FM 1346 (East Houston Street)	
San Antonio	35.39	56.95	35	US 87 (Rigsby Avenue) – Victoria, La Vernia	
San Antonio	37.22	59.90	37	Southcross Boulevard/New Sulphur Springs Road, Sinclair Road	
San Antonio	38.54	62.02	39	Spur 117 (W.W. White Road)	
San Antonio	40.54	65.24	41	I-37 / US 281 north (Adams Freeway) – San Antonio, Corpus Christi	East end of US 281 concurrency; I-37 exit 133, access to Mission Trail Baptist Hospital
San Antonio	41.29	66.45	42	Spur 122 (South Presa Street) / Southton Road	
San Antonio	43.21	69.54	43	Espada Road – San Antonio Missions National Historical Park	Westbound exit is via exit 44
San Antonio	44.37	71.41	44	US 281 south / Spur 536 (Roosevelt Avenue) – Pleasanton	West end of US 281 concurrency
San Antonio	45.94	73.93	46	Moursund Boulevard	
San Antonio	47.22	75.99	47	University Way – Texas A&M University–San Antonio	Eastbound exit and eastbound entrance
San Antonio	47.69	76.75	48	Zarzamora Street	
San Antonio	48.92	78.73	49	SH 16 south (Palo Alto Road) / Spur 422 (Poteet-Jourdanton Freeway) – Poteet	East end of SH 16 concurrency
San Antonio	51.32	82.59	51	FM 2790 (Somerset Road)	
San Antonio	52.30 0.00	84.17 0.00	53	I-35 (Pan Am Expressway) – San Antonio, Laredo	South end of SH 130 concurrency; I-35 exit 145A
1.000 mi = 1.609 km; 1.000 km = 0.621 mi: Concurrency terminus; Incomplete access
