= Interstate 37 =

Interstate Highway in South Texas

Interstate 37
- I-37 highlighted in red

Route information
- Maintained by TxDOT
- Length: 143.00 mi (230.14 km)
- Existed: October 16, 1959–present
- NHS: Entire route

Major junctions
- South end: Mesquite Street in Corpus Christi
- US 181 / SH 35 / SH 286 in Corpus Christi; I-69E / US 77 in Corpus Christi; Future I-69W / Future I-69C / US 59 near George West; US 281 near Three Rivers; US 181 in San Antonio; I-410 / US 281 / SH 130 in San Antonio; I-10 / US 87 / US 90 in San Antonio
- North end: I-35 / US 281 in San Antonio

Location
- Country: United States
- State: Texas
- Counties: Nueces, San Patricio, Live Oak, Atascosa, Bexar

Highway system
- Interstate Highway System; Main; Auxiliary; Suffixed; Business; Future; Highways in Texas; Interstate; US; State; Former; Toll; Loops; Spurs; FM/RM; Park; Rec
← SH 36	→ SH 37

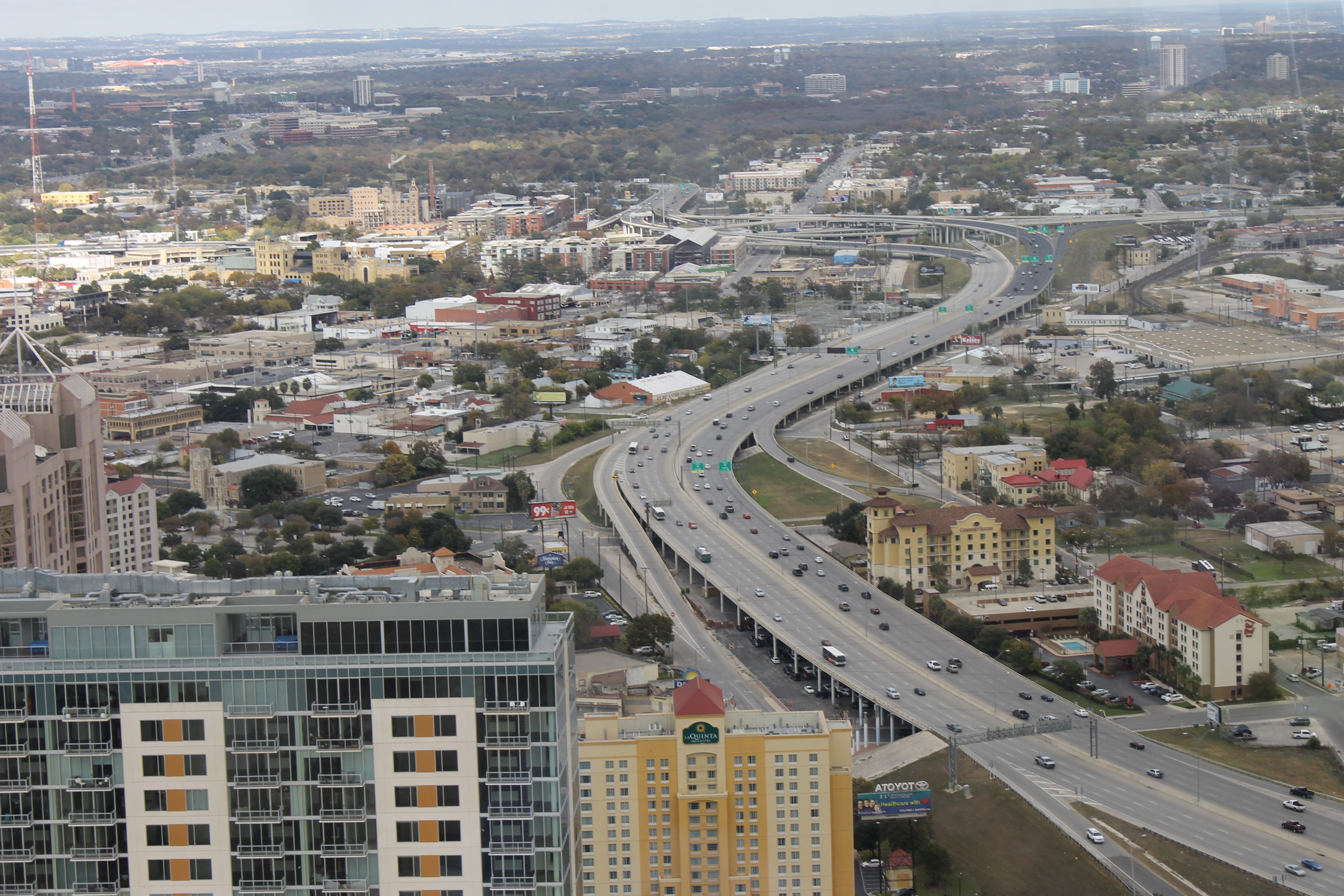
I-37 from the top of the Tower of the Americas in San Antonio

Interstate 37 (I-37 (Note: Some sources use "IH-37", as "IH" is an abbreviation used by TxDOT for Interstate Highways.)) is a 143-mile (230 km) Interstate Highway located within the southern portion of the US state of Texas. The highway was first designated in 1959 as a route between Corpus Christi and San Antonio. Construction in the urban areas of Corpus Christi and San Antonio began in the 1960s, and the segments of the Interstate Highway in rural areas were completed by the 1980s. Prior to I-37, the route between Corpus Christi and San Antonio was served by a combination of State Highway 9 (SH 9) from Corpus Christi to Three Rivers and US Highway 281 (US 281) from Three Rivers to San Antonio. As a result of the construction of I-37, SH 9 was removed from the State Highway System (the designation would be reinstated to another highway in 2014).

The highway begins in Corpus Christi at Mesquite Street prior to its junction with US 181, SH 35 and SH 286, then heads north to San Antonio, where it ends at I-35. Beyond I-35, the freeway continues as US 281 to northern San Antonio as a major freeway. In Corpus Christi, the highway provides access to the downtown area, the Port of Corpus Christi, and Corpus Christi International Airport. In San Antonio, it provides access to Downtown San Antonio, Brooks City-Base, the Alamodome, the Tower of the Americas, the San Antonio River Walk, the Alamo, and, by extension via US 281, San Antonio International Airport. The route provides an important connection between I-35 and the Texas Gulf Coast as well as one of the few limited-access hurricane evacuation routes away from the southern Texas coast.

== Route description ==
I-37 starts near the Gulf Coast in Corpus Christi and heads northwest toward San Antonio. It links South Texas to the northern parts of the state via I-69E, US 77, and US 281. The highway functions as one of the few freeway hurricane evacuation routes for the southern Texas coast. It roughly parallels US 181, which both begins and ends at I-37, and US 281.

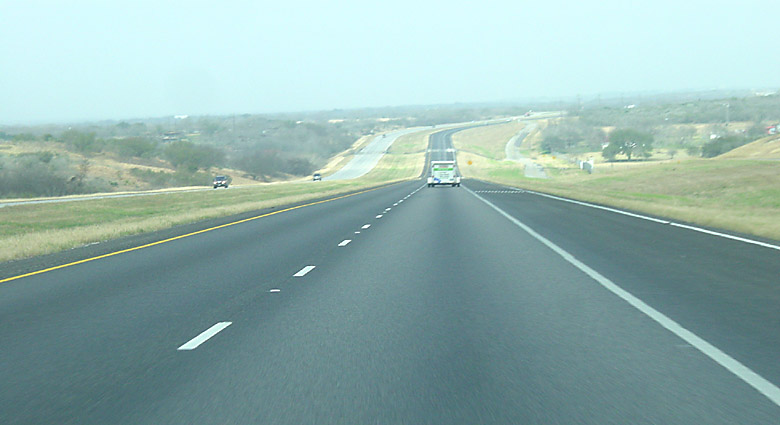
A rural segment of I-37 between Corpus Christi and San Antonio

Unofficially, I-37 begins at an intersection with Shoreline Boulevard on the edge of Corpus Christi Bay. It then heads west as a surface street for three blocks where it becomes entrance and exit ramps which connect to the freeway. I-37 begins officially at the gore point for these ramps, which was part of an interchange complex that formerly represented the former southern ends of US 181 and SH 35 prior to the 2025 closure of the original Corpus Christi Harbor Bridge.

I-37 then heads west from downtown Corpus Christi and intersects two freeway interchanges. At exit 1C, SH 286 (the Crosstown Expressway) goes south of I-37 and a realigned US 181/SH 35 (connecting to the new Harbor Bridge Project) goes north of I-37. Next, at exit 4A, I-37 intersects SH 358 (Padre Island Drive), which provides access to SH 44. The highway turns toward the northwest after the SH 358 interchange roughly parallel to the south of the Nueces River. Just prior to leaving the Corpus Christi city limits, it intersects and has a short concurrency with US 77 (future I-69E). US 77 (future I-69E) merges with I-37 as a freeway from the south at exit 14A northbound and exit 14 southbound; the two continue to the north and split after crossing the Nueces River. The Interstate continues to the northwest as US 77 (future I-69E) continues to the northeast at exit 17.

I-37 transitions to a rural setting once outside of the Corpus Christi city limits on its way to Mathis and Lake Corpus Christi. It continues on to the northwest and intersects US 59 (future I-69W) east of George West at exit 56. It begins paralleling US 281 to the east before the two intersect at exit 72 and have a concurrency north of Three Rivers near Choke Canyon Reservoir. Alternate US 281 (Alt. US 281) splits off from I-37 near Sunniland at exit 76 and parallels I-37 before rejoining north of Campbellton at exit 92 southbound. The two routes remain concurrent until US 281 splits off at exit 104 northbound to head to Pleasanton, while I-37 bypasses the city to the east. After US 281 leaves toward the northwest, I-37 turns to the north toward San Antonio.

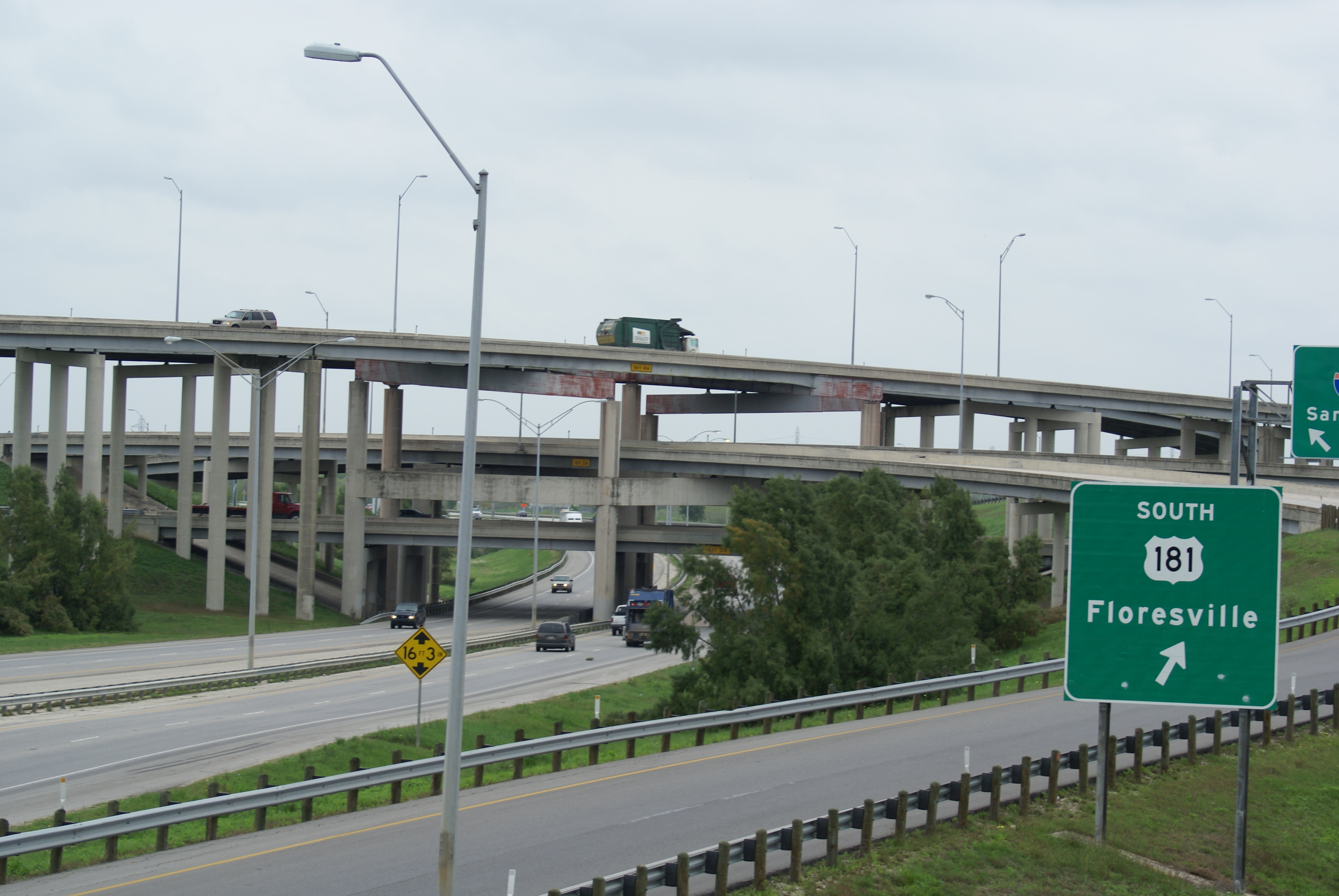
I-37 and I-410 interchange on the southeast side of San Antonio

As I-37 enters the San Antonio city limits, it intersects the northern terminus of US 181 at exit 132 southbound (this is according to the Texas Department of Transportation, or TxDOT; the American Association of State Highway and Transportation Officials, or AASHTO, extends US 181 northward to the northern terminus of I-37). Continuing to the north, it intersects I-410, the inner loop around San Antonio, at exit 133 at a stack interchange. At this junction, the Interstate once again runs concurrently with US 281 which had been concurrent with I-410. Heading north through the south side of San Antonio, I-37 provides access to Brooks City-Base (formerly Brooks Air Force Base). After exit 135, a cloverleaf interchange at Loop 13, the freeway turns toward the northwest. The highway intersects I-10, which is concurrent with US 90 and US 87, at exit 139 at a stack interchange on the southeastern corner of Downtown San Antonio. After the interchange, it once again heads north on the east side of downtown. It passes near the Alamodome, Tower of the Americas, San Antonio River Walk, and Alamo. I-37 ends at the northeastern corner of downtown at exits 142A and 142B at a junction with I-35. US 281 continues to the north as a freeway and provides access to San Antonio International Airport and later far north central Texas.

From I-410 to I-10 in San Antonio, I-37 is designated the Lucian Adams Freeway, after the World War II veteran. Adams is a native of Port Arthur and received the Medal of Honor for his service in France, along with the Bronze Star Medal and Purple Heart, for his gallantry during the Battle of Monte Cassino. From I-10 to its northern terminus at I-35, it is designated the Staff Sergeant William J. Bordelon Freeway. Bordelon was the first San Antonio native to receive the Medal of Honor after being killed in action during WWII.

== History ==
Prior to I-37, the routing between Corpus Christi and San Antonio was covered by SH 9 from Corpus Christi to Three Rivers and US 281 from Three Rivers to San Antonio. Beginning in 1971, sections of SH 9 were officially removed from the State Highway System as I-37 was completed. No sections of US 281 were removed from the State Highway System as a result of the construction of I-37, but the two do share the same alignment at two different points between San Antonio and Three Rivers. Also, US 281 was rerouted onto I-37 in San Antonio in 1978.

I-37 was first designated in 1959 to provide a route between San Antonio and Corpus Christi, and construction began in the 1960s. The $11-million (equivalent to $74 million in 2025) project to construct the interchange with I-10 was at the time the largest single contract in the history of the state highway commission. The route was completed by the 1980s. The first sections of the freeway completed were in Corpus Christi. The freeway was completed from its southern terminus to 1.2 miles (1.9 km) to the west at the Port Avenue overpass to include the SH 286 interchange in 1963. In 1964, the freeway was extended another 1.1 miles (1.8 km) westward with the completion of the overpasses at Nueces Bay and Buddy Lawrence boulevards. By 1965, the freeway had been extended west 1.4 miles (2.3 km) to Navigation Boulevard. In 1966, the interchange at SH 358 was complete, as were the mainlanes to Corn Products Road, one mile (1.6 km) west of the SH 358 interchange. By 1968, the freeway had been completed an additional 8.1 miles (13.0 km) further west to Callicoatte Road. The southbound I-37 bridge over the Nueces River was built in 1933 for US 77 (future I-69E) when it was first routed through Corpus Christi. The northbound bridge was built in 1958 with the expansion of US 77 (future I-69E) to four lanes.

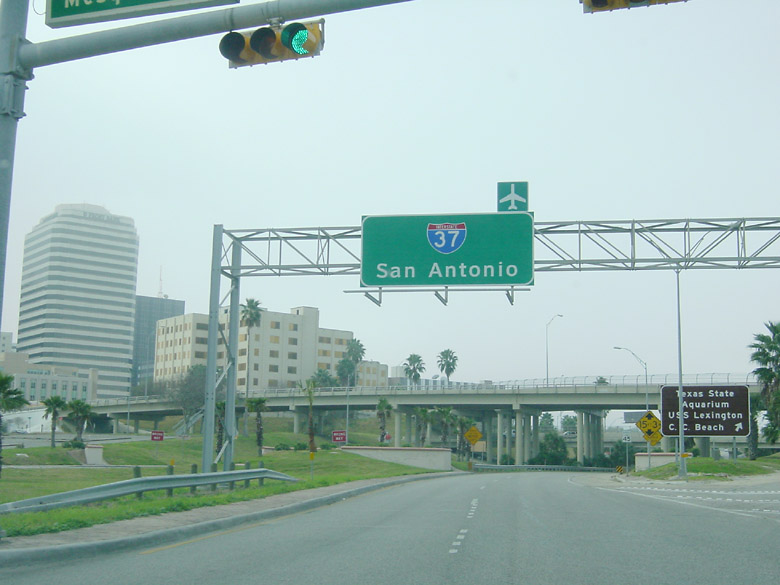
The southern terminus of I-37 in Corpus Christi

Construction in San Antonio also began in the 1960s and was completed in 1972. The first sections were completed in 1967 to include the portion just south of I-410 at the US 181 interchange. The section from Steves Avenue north to Florida Street to include the I-10 interchange was also complete in 1967. In 1968, the section south of I-410 was extended south to Loop 1604. In 1969, the two sections were connected with the completion of overpasses at Goliad Road, Pecan Valley Drive, Fair Avenue, and Hackberry Street as well as the completion of the interchanges at I-410 and Loop 13. The last sections left were on the eastside of downtown. The downtown overpasses at Durango Boulevard, Commerce Street, and the overpass stretching from Houston Street to Jones Avenue were all completed in 1972. The last portion completed in San Antonio was the stack interchange at I-35 (also known as the San Antonio "Downtown Mixer"), near the Pearl Brewery. With the completion of the interchange in 1972, the city had a complete freeway loop in conjunction with I-10 and I-35 around the central business district of the city. At the time construction began in July 1969, the I-35 interchange was the largest highway construction project in state history at $11 million (equivalent to $74 million in 2025).

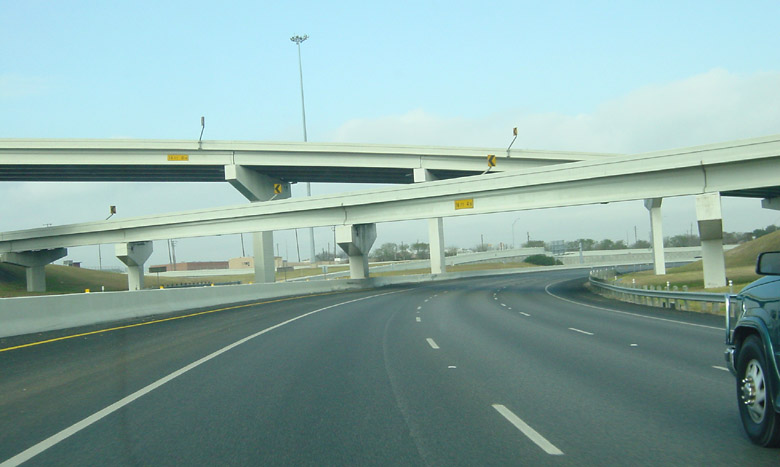
The interchange between I-37 and I-69E/US 77

The rural sections of the freeway were completed later than those in the urban areas. Construction of the highway in Corpus Christi and Nueces County continued north over the Nueces River into San Patrico County. The interchange at US 77 (future I-69E) was completed in 1969. The road that was already in existence along this stretch, SH 9, would be utilized as a frontage road as many of the bridges along this stretch were from when SH 9 was built in the 1930s. The mainlanes were extended northward to SH 234 in 1969. By 1970, the freeway had been extended as far north as SH 188. In 1971, I-37 reached Farm to Market Road 888 (FM 888) and service to the city of Mathis. During the mid-1970s, the southern section and northern section were both being extended. The southern section was extended northward in Live Oak County to US 59 (future I-69W) in 1975 and FM 799 in 1976. The northern section saw completion in Atascosa County to FM 541 in 1975 and FM 1099 in 1976. By the early 1980s, the freeway was nearly complete. In 1980, the interchange at US 281 southeast of Pleasanton was complete. With the completion of the interchange at SH 72 and other bridges in the Pleasanton area in 1981, I-37 was complete.

== Exit list ==
County	Location	mi	km	Exit	Destinations	Notes
Nueces	Corpus Christi	0.00	0.00		Mesquite Street	At-grade intersection
Nueces	Corpus Christi	0.44	0.71	1A	Buffalo Street	Southbound exit and northbound entrance
Nueces	Corpus Christi	1.10	1.77	1B	Port Avenue, Nueces Bay Boulevard, Lawrence Drive	Northbound exit and southbound entrance
Nueces	Corpus Christi	0.99– 1.33	1.59– 2.14	1C	SH 286 south (Crosstown Expressway)	Access to Spohn Memorial Hospital
Nueces	Corpus Christi	0.99– 1.33	1.59– 2.14	1C	US 181 north / SH 35 north – Portland	Southbound opened in June 2025; northbound opened in September 2025
Nueces	Corpus Christi	1.46	2.35	1D	Port Avenue, Staples Street	Southbound exit and northbound entrance
Nueces	Corpus Christi	2.12– 2.54	3.41– 4.09	1E	Lawrence Drive, Nueces Bay Boulevard	
Nueces	Corpus Christi	3.27	5.26	2	Up River Road	
Nueces	Corpus Christi	3.92	6.31	3A	Navigation Boulevard	
Nueces	Corpus Christi	4.45	7.16	3B	McBride Lane, Lantana Street	Northbound exit and southbound entrance
Nueces	Corpus Christi	4.78	7.69	4A	SH 358 east / SH 44 west – NAS Corpus Christi, Padre Island, Airport	
Nueces	Corpus Christi	4.96	7.98	4B	Lantana Street, McBride Lane	Southbound exit and northbound entrance
Nueces	Corpus Christi	5.82	9.37	5	Corn Products Road / Valero Way	
Nueces	Corpus Christi	7.01	11.28	6	Southern Minerals Road	
Nueces	Corpus Christi	8.31– 8.55	13.37– 13.76	7	Tuloso Road, Suntide Road	
Nueces	Corpus Christi	10.15	16.33	9	FM 2292 (Rand Morgan Road) / Up River Road	
Nueces	Corpus Christi	11.23	18.07	10	Carbon Plant Road/Joe Fulton Int'l Trade Corridor	Southbound exit leads to Carbon Plant Road
Nueces	Corpus Christi	11.34	18.25	10A	Joe Fulton Int'l Trade Corridor	Southbound exit; northbound exit is part of exit 10
Nueces	Corpus Christi	11.95	19.23	11A	FM 3386 (McKinzie Road)	
Nueces	Corpus Christi	12.59	20.26	11B	FM 24 (Violet Road) / Hart Road	
Nueces	Corpus Christi	13.89	22.35	13A	FM 1694 (Callicoatte Road) / Leopard Street	
Nueces	Corpus Christi	14.66	23.59	13B	Sharpsburg Road	Northbound exit and southbound entrance
Nueces	Corpus Christi	15.22	24.49	14A	I-69E south / US 77 south – Kingsville, Robstown, Brownsville	South end of US 77 overlap; current northern end of I-69E, signed as exit 14 southbound; access to Corpus Christi Medical Center-Northwest
Nueces	Corpus Christi	15.47	24.90	14B	Red Bird Lane	Northbound exit and southbound entrance
Nueces	Corpus Christi	15.96	25.69	15	Sharpsburg Road, Red Bird Lane	Southbound exit and northbound entrance
Nueces	Corpus Christi	17.01	27.37	16	Labonte Park	
San Patricio		18.04	29.03	17	Future I-69E north / US 77 north – Victoria, Sinton	North end of US 77 overlap
San Patricio		20.46	32.93	20A	Picnic Area	
San Patricio		21.47	34.55	20B	Cooper Road	
San Patricio	Edroy	23.42– 23.94	37.69– 38.53	22	SH 234 / FM 796 – Edroy, Odem	
San Patricio		31.75	51.10	31	SH 188 – Sinton, Rockport	
San Patricio	Mathis	35.21	56.67	34	Spur 459 – Mathis, Alice	
San Patricio	Mathis	36.83	59.27	36	SH 359 – Skidmore, Mathis	
Live Oak		41.05	66.06	40	FM 888	
Live Oak		47.88	77.06	47	FM 534 / FM 3024 – Swinney Switch	
Live Oak		51.87	83.48	51	Hailey Ranch Road	
Live Oak		57.17	92.01	56	Future I-69W / US 59 – George West, Beeville	
Live Oak		60.41	97.22	59	FM 799	
Live Oak		66.43	106.91	65	FM 1358 – Oakville	
Live Oak		69.88	112.46	69	SH 72 – Three Rivers, Kenedy	
Live Oak		73.55	118.37	72	US 281 south – Three Rivers, Alice	South end of US 281 overlap
Live Oak		77.40	124.56	76	US 281 Alt. / FM 2049 – Whitsett	
Live Oak		84.19	135.49	83	FM 99 – Whitsett, Karnes City	
Atascosa		89.52	144.07	88	FM 1099 – Campbellton	
Atascosa		93.31	150.17	92	US 281 Alt. – Campbellton, Whitsett	Southbound exit and northbound entrance
Atascosa		99.09	159.47	98	FM 541 – McCoy, Poth	
Atascosa		104.85	168.74	103	US 281 north – Pleasanton	North end of US 281 overlap; northbound exit and southbound entrance
Atascosa		105.32	169.50	104	Spur 199 (Leal Road)	No southbound entrance
Atascosa		107.34	172.75	106	Coughran Road	
Atascosa		110.73	178.20	109	SH 97 – Pleasanton, Floresville	
Atascosa		114.73	184.64	113	FM 3006	
Atascosa		118.48	190.68	117	FM 536	
Bexar		120.97	194.68	120	Hardy Road	
Bexar		123.64	198.98	122	Priest Road/Mathis Road	
Bexar		126.40	203.42	125	Loop 1604 (Anderson Loop) – Elmendorf	
Bexar		127.55	205.27	127	San Antonio River Turnaround	Northbound exit and southbound entrance
Bexar	San Antonio	131.04	210.89	130	Southton Road, Donop Road	
Bexar	San Antonio	132.88	213.85	132	Spur 122	Northbound exit and southbound entrance
Bexar	San Antonio	133.60	215.01	132	US 181 south – Floresville	Southbound exit and northbound entrance
Bexar	San Antonio	134.70	216.78	133	I-410 (Connally Loop) / SH 130 / US 281 south	South end of US 281 overlap; I-410 exit 41
Bexar	San Antonio	136.47	219.63	135	Loop 13 (Military Drive) – Brooks City-Base	Access to Stinson Municipal Airport and Mission Trail Baptist Hospital
Bexar	San Antonio	137.62	221.48	136	Pecan Valley Drive	
Bexar	San Antonio	138.34	222.64	137	Hot Wells Boulevard	
Bexar	San Antonio	138.98– 139.14	223.67– 223.92	138	New Braunfels Avenue, Southcross Boulevard	Signed as exits 138A (east) and 138B (west) southbound
Bexar	San Antonio	139.84	225.05	138C	Fair Avenue, Hackberry Street	
Bexar	San Antonio	140.77	226.55	139	I-10 (Jose Lopez Freeway) / US 87 / US 90 – El Paso, Houston, Victoria, Del Rio	I-10 exit 575A
Bexar	San Antonio	141.53– 141.61	227.77– 227.90	140A	Florida Street, Carolina Street	
Bexar	San Antonio	142.13	228.74	140B	Cesar Chavez Boulevard – Alamodome	
Bexar	San Antonio	142.69	229.64	141A	Commerce Street – Downtown San Antonio	Signed as exit 141 northbound
Bexar	San Antonio	142.90	229.98	141B	Houston Street – The Alamo	Southbound exit and northbound entrance
Bexar	San Antonio	143.23	230.51	141C	McCullough Avenue, Nolan Street	Southbound exit and northbound entrance
Bexar	San Antonio	143.91	231.60	142	I-35 (Pan Am Expressway) – Austin, Laredo US 281 north (McAllister Freeway) – Johnson City, San Antonio International Airport	Signed as exits 142A (north) and 142B (south); I-35 exit 158; northern terminus; roadway continues beyond I-35 as US 281
1.000 mi = 1.609 km; 1.000 km = 0.621 mi: Concurrency terminus; Incomplete access
