= San Antonio International Airport =

Airport in Texas, United States

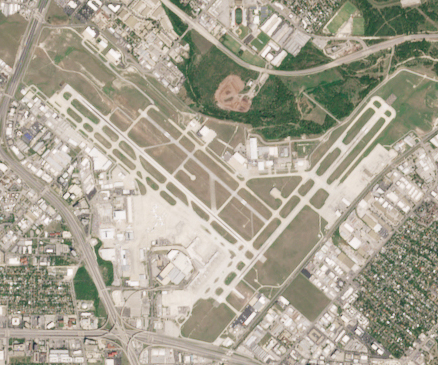
- Satellite view in 2020
- IATA: SAT; ICAO: KSAT; FAA LID: SAT

Summary
- Airport type: Public
- Owner: City of San Antonio
- Operator: San Antonio Aviation Department
- Serves: Greater San Antonio
- Location: San Antonio, Texas, U.S.
- Elevation AMSL: 809 ft (247 m)
- Coordinates: 29°31′36″N 098°28′19″W
- Website: sanantonio.gov/SAT

Maps
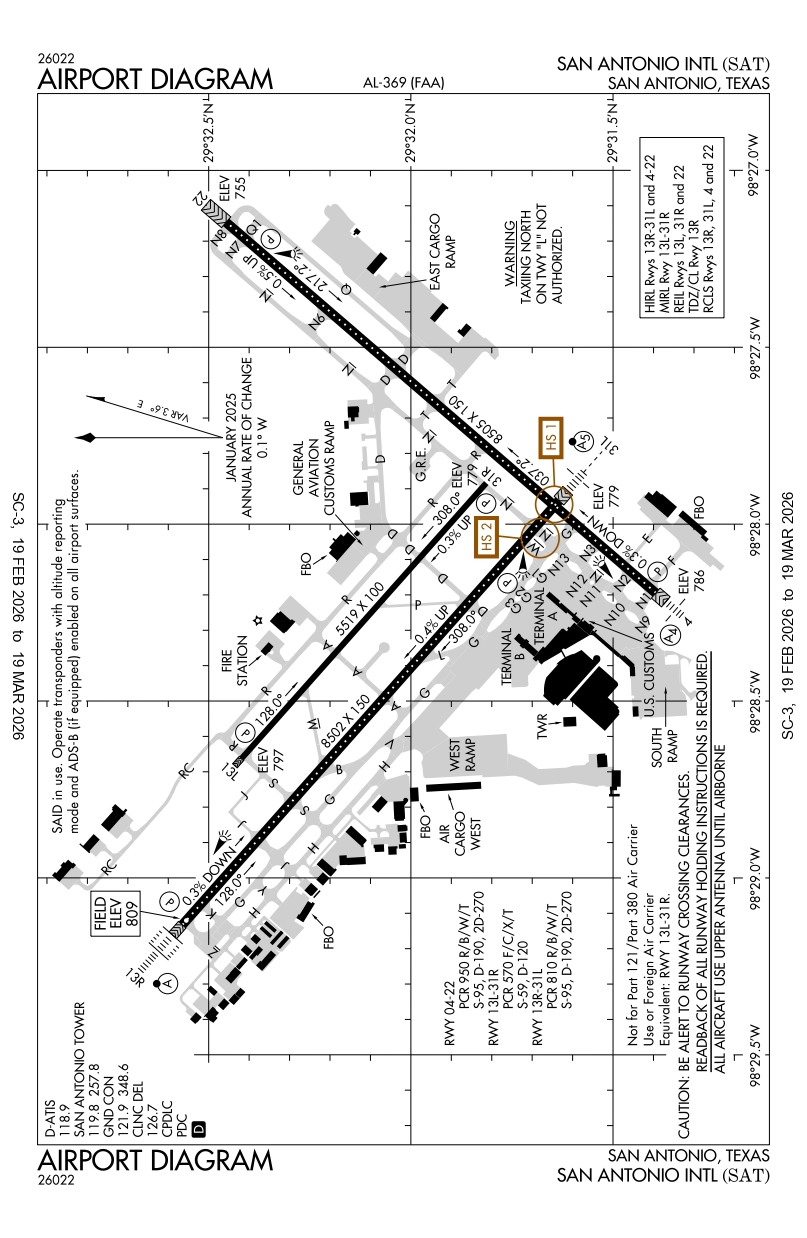
- FAA airport diagram
- Interactive map of San Antonio International Airport

Runways
Direction	Length		Surface
Direction	ft	m	Surface
04/22	8,505	2,592	Concrete
13L/31R	5,519	1,682	Asphalt
13R/31L	8,502	2,591	Concrete

Statistics (2025)
- Total passengers: 10,740,694 ▼3.2%
- Total cargo (lbs.): 274,847,470
- Source: Federal Aviation Administration

San Antonio International Airport (IATA: SAT, ICAO: KSAT, FAA LID: SAT) is an international airport in San Antonio, Texas, United States. It is in Uptown Central San Antonio, about 8 miles (13 km) north of Downtown. It has three runways and covers 2,305 acres (933 ha). Its elevation is 809 feet (247 m) above sea level. SAT averages 260 daily departures and arrivals at its 27 gates, which serve 14 airlines flying non-stop to 45 destinations in the US and Mexico. The airport is the 43rd busiest airport in the United States by passenger traffic.

== History ==
=== Beginnings ===
San Antonio International Airport was founded in 1941 when the City of San Antonio purchased 1,200 acres (490 ha) of undeveloped land that was then north of the city limits (now part of the city's Uptown District) for a project to be called "San Antonio Municipal Airport." World War II wartime needs meant the airport was not fully finished until after the war.

A large portion of the northeast section of the airport was pressed into federal government service. This area was known as Alamo Field and was used by the United States Army Air Forces as a training base. The 77th Reconnaissance Group, equipped with various aircraft (P-39, P-40, A-20, B-25, O-47, O-52, and L-5) trained reconnaissance personnel who later served overseas. One squadron (113th) flew antisubmarine patrols over the Gulf of Mexico.

The first airline to serve the airport was Braniff Airlines in 1943, followed by American Airlines the following year. In 1944 the airports name was changed from San Antonio Municipal Airport to the current name of San Antonio International Airport. At the end of World War II the Alamo Field portion of the airport was no longer needed by the military and was turned over to the City of San Antonio for civil use. Terminal 2 was built in 1951–53, along with the FAA control tower and a baggage claim area. For HemisFair '68, a new satellite concourse was built, containing eight jet bridge gates and passenger waiting areas. In June 1971, the airport was one of three original destinations along with Dallas and Houston for new startup Southwest Airlines.

=== Expansion for a growing city ===
In 1975 the city adopted its first Airport Master Plan with plans for a new 1,300 space parking garage and a new 360,000 sq ft (33,000 m^{2}) Terminal (formerly called Terminal 1, now called Terminal A). Once the new terminal was completed in 1984 it brought the airport's capacity up from eight gates to 27 gates. In 1986 a new 221-foot (67 m) FAA air traffic control tower was built at a new location.

In 1994 a second Airport Master Plan was developed that would take the airport into the 21st century. This plan included major updates for the airport: more parking spaces in a 3,000 space parking garage to be completed by 2007, improved airport access and an improved concession program. Two new terminals were planned to replace Terminal 2, to increase the airports gate count to 35. San Antonio boarded over 3.5 million passengers in 1999. Since 1966, the airport has boarded more than 80 million people.

=== Recent history ===
From February to September 2006, the airport was a focus city for United Airlines (the airline called it a "hublet") with flights to 12 cities in conjunction with partner Trans States Airlines. Trans States Airlines redeployed its aircraft elsewhere, eliminating service to seven cities.

Mexicana celebrated 50 years serving the airport in September 2007, but suspended service to San Antonio in August 2010 when the airline went bankrupt and suspended operations. From April 2007 to September 2008 ExpressJet operated a focus city under its own branded operations at the airport. Many of the cities served were ones previously operated during the United Airlines focus city the previous year. All service ended when ExpressJet folded its branded operations.

On November 9, 2010, the original Terminal 2 closed, and Terminal B opened. Terminal 1 was then renamed Terminal A. The removal of fixtures in the old Terminal 2 began in January 2011. Final demolition of Terminal 2 was in May 2011. In 2013, the SAT Customs and Border Protection became a Global Entry enrollment center.

In June 2015, officials announced that the three-story short-term parking garage, which was over 30 years old, would be closed and demolished to make way for a new seven-story parking garage and Consolidated Rental Car Center. Work began in early 2017 on the 1.8 million square feet facility, which was planned to house up to 14 rental car brands and short-term public parking. The public parking portion was completed in April 2017, and the rental car portion opened in January 2018. The airport received its first nonstop flight to Europe in May 2024, with German airline Condor launching seasonal service to Frankfurt. The flight was pulled a few months later.

== Expansion ==
Beginning in 2023 with a scheduled completion in 2028, the airport will complete a new terminal, renovate the existing Terminal A, and upgrade the airfield and roadways to accommodate the projected growth and needs of passengers.

The new Terminal C will feature up to 17 domestic and international gates, with six of the gates able to accommodate wide-body aircraft. The new terminal will be about the same size as the current two terminals combined, providing ample room for new concession space, club lounges, and a modern federal inspection station for expanded international air service. It will also contain a central passenger screening area for all terminals.

Terminal A will be renovated with state-of-the-art systems and a wider concourse. New roadways will improve traffic flow and remove congestion.

=== Current projects ===
Construction began October 2023 on a Ground Load Facility expected to be completed by early 2025. The facility will be connected to the current Terminal A. It will contain three ground load gate positions, along with retail and food options. The facility is geared towards ultra low-cost airlines such as Frontier Airlines.

== Facilities ==
=== Terminals ===
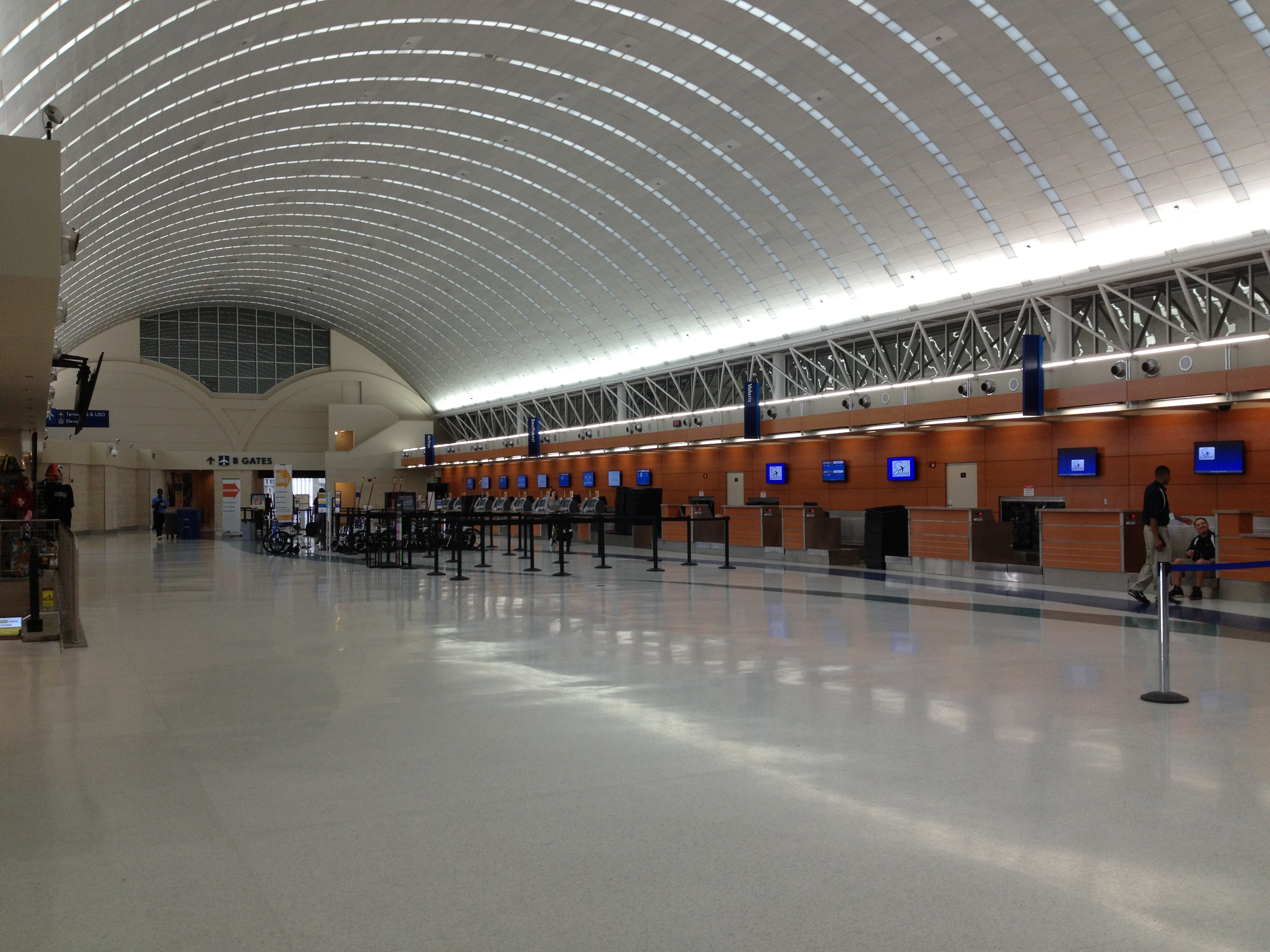
Terminal A ticket counters

San Antonio International Airport has two terminals with an overall 27 jet bridge gates. The original one-level terminal (formerly Terminal 2) opened in 1953 with ground-loading holding areas and was expanded twice, once in 1959 with new east and west wings, and again in 1968 with an eight-gate satellite concourse, which was built to handle visitors to HemisFair '68. Terminal 2 closed on November 9, 2010, as the new Terminal B opened, and Terminal 2 began to be demolished in March 2011, with completion in January 2012. A second terminal (now Terminal A) opened in 1984 with a 16-gate concourse. The U.S. Customs and Border Protection facility is located in Terminal A.

Terminal A is the larger of the two concourses, with 17 gates in total. All international carriers operate out of Terminal A. On June 18, 2014, a $35.6 million renovation was completed for this terminal, with the most visible improvements to passengers being new terrazzo floors, updated food courts, and new signage. On October 15, 2014, all gates in Terminal A were renumbered in sequential order. 12 of the current 14 airlines serving the airport operate from Terminal A, including the Airport's largest airline by passengers and routes served, Southwest Airlines.

Terminal B opened in November 2010, containing eight gates. Corgan Associates, Inc. and 3D/International designed the new terminal. American and Continental were the two original airlines at Terminal B. United, at the time located in Terminal A, moved into Terminal B on August 1, 2012, during the merger with Continental. A United Club is located between gates B3 and B5. The USO is located on the arrivals level of Terminal B next to baggage claim. In 2022 construction began to add two more gates to Terminal B in order to better accommodate increasing passenger numbers. Construction was completed in January 2023, bringing the total gates for Terminal B to ten.

== Airlines and destinations ==
=== Passenger ===
Airlines	Destinations
Aeroméxico	Mexico City–Benito Juárez
Air Canada	Seasonal: Toronto–Pearson
Alaska Airlines	Seattle/Tacoma
American Airlines	Charlotte, Chicago–O'Hare, Dallas/Fort Worth, Miami, Phoenix–Sky Harbor, Washington–National; Seasonal: Philadelphia
American Eagle	Chicago–O'Hare, Los Angeles; Seasonal: Dallas/Fort Worth, Miami, Phoenix–Sky Harbor
Breeze Airways	Memphis, Raleigh/Durham; Seasonal: Pensacola
Delta Air Lines	Atlanta, Boston, Detroit, Los Angeles, Minneapolis/St. Paul, New York–JFK, Salt Lake City
Frontier Airlines	Denver, Las Vegas, Orlando, Phoenix–Sky Harbor
Southwest Airlines	Atlanta, Baltimore, Chicago–Midway, Dallas–Love, Denver, El Paso, Houston–Hobby, Kansas City, Las Vegas, Los Angeles, Nashville, New Orleans, Orlando, Phoenix–Sky Harbor, San Diego, St. Louis, Tampa; Seasonal: Albuquerque, Cancún, Colorado Springs, Fort Lauderdale
United Airlines	Chicago–O'Hare, Denver, Houston–Intercontinental, Newark, San Francisco, Washington–Dulles
United Express	Denver, Houston–Intercontinental, San Francisco; Seasonal: Chicago–O'Hare, Washington–Dulles
Viva	León/Del Bajío, Mexico City–Benito Juárez, Monterrey, Querétaro; Seasonal: Torreón/Gómez Palacio
Volaris	Guadalajara, Mexico City–Benito Juárez, Querétaro, San Luis Potosí

== Statistics ==
=== Top destinations ===
Busiest domestic routes from SAT(January 2025 – December 2025)
Rank	City	Passengers	Carriers
1	Dallas/Fort Worth, Texas	515,750	American
2	(Georgia (U.S. state)) Atlanta, Georgia	430,300	Delta, Southwest
3	Denver, Colorado	374,060	Frontier, Southwest, United
4	Las Vegas, Nevada	301,140	Frontier, Southwest
5	Phoenix–Sky Harbor, Arizona	290,110	American, Southwest, Frontier
6	Houston–Intercontinental, Texas	285,010	United
7	Dallas–Love, Texas	275,890	Southwest
8	Los Angeles, California	214,910	American, Delta, Southwest
9	Charlotte, North Carolina	195,000	American
10	Chicago–O'Hare, Illinois	185,150	American, United

Largest airlines at SAT (June 2024 – May 2025)
Rank	Airline	Passengers	Share
1	Southwest Airlines	3,601,000	37.03%
2	American Airlines	1,953,000	20.08%
3	Delta Air Lines	1,566,000	16.10%
4	United Airlines	1,332,000	13.70%
5	Frontier Airlines	320,000	4.98%
-	Other	783,000	8.11%

=== Annual traffic ===
Annual passenger and cargo traffic at SAT 2010–Present
Year	Passengers	Total Cargo (lbs.)	Year	Passengers	Total Cargo (lbs.)
2010	8,034,720	272,951,743	2020	4,028,564	264,724,416
2011	8,171,824	264,655,349‡	2021	7,464,662	277,508,342
2012	8,243,221	258,339,048	2022	9,462,449	268,167,283
2013	8,252,330	231,784,536	2023	10,676,570	241,710,500
2014	8,369,746‡	233,333,939	2024	11,094,278	237,581,587
2015	8,507,459	232,687,687	2025	10,740,694	274,847,470
2016	8,618,139‡	238,056,389‡	2026		
2017	9,063,542	250,691,696	2027		
2018	10,044,411	272,517,382‡	2028		
2019	10,363,040	277,579,134	2029		

‡ = Revised data.

== Ground transportation ==
The airport has a 1.8 million square foot consolidated rental car facility that was completed in January 2018. The facility is reached via a sky bridge from the mezzanine level of Terminal B.

The airport is located near the intersection of Interstate 410 and U.S. 281 in Uptown Central San Antonio. U.S. 281 provides quick drives (under 15 minutes in normal traffic) to Downtown and northern San Antonio. Interstate 410, a loop, makes the rest of the city easily accessible.

VIA Metropolitan Transit provides weekday express bus service from the airport directly to Downtown and a park & ride facility in Stone Oak on Route 7; Route 5 provides local bus service and transfers to other routes at the North Star Transit Center.

== Other facilities ==
ST Engineering maintains a large presence at the airport knows as SAA (San Antonio Aerospace) employing around 1,000 staff. The facilities were previously owned by Dee Howard Aircraft Maintenance and were purchased during the company's bankruptcy in 2002. The facility provides heavy maintenance and other services for numerous passenger and cargo airlines along with aircraft leasing operations. The most recent addition being a passenger to cargo conversion line for Airbus A320 series family.

== Accidents and incidents ==
- On January 31, 1967, a Saturn Airways DC-6 was operating on a cargo flight to Kelly AFB. The crew decided to divert to San Antonio International Airport and commenced the approach. The airplane descended 1,100 feet (340 m) below the glide slope, flew through trees and collided with a cliff. All three occupants were killed.
- On October 29, 2012, Interjet Flight 2953, scheduled to Mexico City International Airport, made an emergency landing at San Antonio after suffering engine sputtering problems that were caused by a bird strike. No injuries or fatalities were reported.
- On November 15, 2019, a Cessna 525 Citation arriving from San Jose International Airport collided with a parked Cessna 560 Citation during taxi to a service center. No injuries were reported.
- On December 1, 2019, a Piper PA-24 Comanche en route to Boerne from Sugar Land crashed in a neighborhood while attempting an emergency landing at the airport. While there were no injuries on the ground, the three occupants of the aircraft were killed.
- On June 23, 2023, a ground crew worker employed by Unifi died by suicide after he was ingested into the left engine of an Airbus A319 operating as Delta Air Lines Flight 1111 taxiing to the gate.

== See also ==
- Texas World War II Army Airfields
- Stinson Municipal Airport
