= Brooks City-Base =

Human settlement in San Antonio, Texas, US

Brooks is a mixed-use development that was founded on the former Brooks Air Force Base when the United States Air Force closed the facility in 2002.

Following the 1995 BRAC, when Brooks AFB was removed from the Base Realignment and Closure list, city, state, military, and community planners began several years of hard work to develop a plan to privatize approved the gradual transition in ownership of Brooks AFB from the Air Force to the Brooks Development Authority. This transition came into full effect on July 22, 2002, when the Brooks Development Authority assumed control of the newly named Brooks City-Base. In 2005, Brooks City-Base was once again placed on the BRAC list. Air Force operations ceased on September 15, 2011. In 2017, "City Base" was dropped from the development name, to better communicate that the area is no longer an active base and is open to all visitors.

The Brooks Development Authority has demonstrated economic development success with projects including a 62-acre (250,000 m2) retail development, approximately 256,000 square feet (23,800 m2) of research and distribution facilities for DPT Laboratories, the South Texas Center for Emerging Infectious Diseases (an infectious disease research institute coordinated with the University of Texas at San Antonio), an international pharmaceutical company, and a $25.5 million City/County emergency operations center which opened in the fall of 2007. The 311th Air Base Group inactivated on September 1, 2011, and the remaining few USAF personnel had shuttered the base for good by the 15th of that month.

In the spring of 2006, construction of Brooks Academy of Science and Engineering, a STEM charter school, started on 8 acres of land in the southeast part of Brooks. Classes had already started in August 2006 at a temporary location on South Presa Street (in the far west part of Brooks), and then students were relocated to the current location of Brooks Academy (on the north side of Lyster Road) in March 2007.

In August 2011, Texas A&M University opened a satellite campus at 2601 Louis Bauer Drive (in the west part of Brooks), and uses this building for the College of Business and the Department of Counseling and Leadership.

In 2012, the $90 million Mission Trail Baptist Hospital opened at 3327 Research Plaza.

On August 8, 2016, the University of the Incarnate Word opened a School of Osteopathic Medicine on 16 acres in the northwest part of Brooks (at 100 Kennedy Circle), in buildings which were once the Air Force School of Aerospace Medicine. Classes will begin in August 2017.
