= Palo Pinto Creek =

Coordinates: 32°38′36″N 98°6′12″W

Location
- Country: United States

Physical characteristics
- Source
  - location: Texas

Palo Pinto Creek is a river in Eastland, Stephens, and Palo Pinto counties, Texas, United States. It is a tributary of the Brazos River.

The creek rises near the city of Ranger and flows northeast then east past Strawn and Mingus. It turns northeast again and is impounded in Lake Palo Pinto, then turns to the east and joins the Brazos north of New Salem, about 50 miles (80 km) west of Fort Worth.

== See also ==
- List of rivers of Texas
- Palo Pinto, Texas
