= Palo Pinto =

Palo Pinto may refer to various locations:

- Palo Pinto, Missouri
- Palo Pinto County, Texas - a county in northern Texas state.
- Palo Pinto, Texas - county seat of and city in Palo Pinto County, Texas.
- Palo Pinto Independent School District - public school district for the Palo Pinto area.
