= Texas State Highway 16 =

State highway in Texas, United States

State Highway 16

Route information
- Maintained by TxDOT
- Length: 541.823 mi (871.980 km)
- Existed: by 1926–present

Major junctions
- South end: Future I-2 / US 83 in Zapata
- Future I-69W / US 59 in Freer; I-410 in San Antonio; I-35 in San Antonio; US 90 in San Antonio; I-10 in Kerrville; US 87 / US 290 in Fredericksburg; US 190 in San Saba; US 84 / US 183 in Goldthwaite; US 67 / US 377 in Comanche; I-20 near Strawn
- North end: US 281 south of Wichita Falls

Location
- Country: United States
- State: Texas

Highway system
- Highways in Texas; Interstate; US; State; Former; Toll; Loops; Spurs; FM/RM; Park; Rec
← PR 15	→ Spur 16
← SH 345	SH 346	→ SH 347

State Highway 16 (SH 16) is a 541.823-mile (871.980 km) south–north state highway in Texas, United States. that runs from Zapata on the boundary with Mexico to U.S. Highway 281 24 miles (39 km) south of Wichita Falls. It is the longest state highway in Texas, but is only the ninth-longest of any highway classification in the state.

== Route description ==
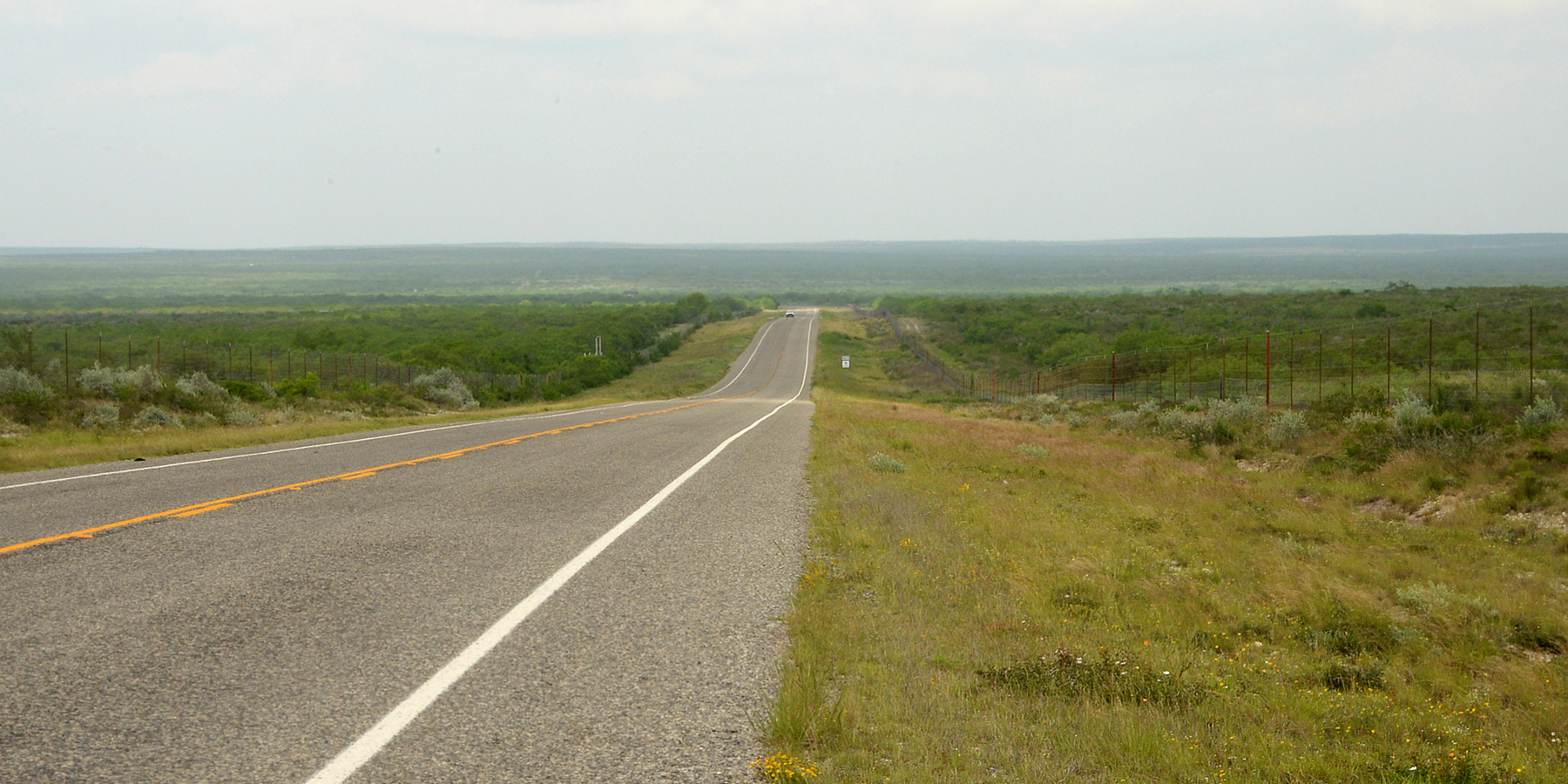
SH 16 in Duval County, April 2016

SH 16 begins at an intersection at US 83 in Zapata. The route continues through south Texas ranchlands, then to the north through San Antonio's far south side. The routes enters San Antonio from the southeast, and goes around the west side of the city concurrent with Interstate 410. The route veers to the northwest as it passes through Bandera, Kerrville, and Fredericksburg, and then reaches the Texas Hill Country. After passing through the cities of Comanche and Llano, it continues north through ranchland and farms. Its next intersection is with I-20 south of the town of Strawn. It continues to the northwest, wrapping around the northern and eastern sides of Possum Kingdom Lake. It reaches an intersection with US 380 in the town of Graham. In North Texas, the highway reaches its northern terminus between Antelope and Windthorst, almost 542 miles from its starting point.

== History ==
SH 16 was one of the original 25 state highways proposed on June 21, 1917, overlaid on top of the Fort Worth-Oklahoma Highway. From 1917, the routing mostly followed present-day Interstate 35W from Fort Worth to Denton. It continued on, routed along present-day Interstate 35 from Fort Worth through to Oklahoma. A spur, SH 16A, went from Denton to Dallas. On March 18, 1919, the route and SH 16A were cancelled, as both routes became part of SH 40.

SH 16 was then reassigned to the future route of U.S. Highway 181 (which was routed over it in 1926) from San Antonio to Corpus Christi on August 21, 1923. SH 16 then went west on SH 44 to Robstown, south on U.S. Highway 77, and west on SH 285. This route replaced portions of SH 9 and SH 12. On January 20, 1930, SH 16 Spur was created in Sinton. SH 16 was extended on January 19, 1932, following SH 9 to Brady, replaced SH 107 to Santa Anna, following SH 7, SH 4, SH 30, and SH 18 to Sagerton, then replaced SH 51 to the Oklahoma state line. On February 10, 1937, the southern section of SH 16 was rerouted northwest and northeast to Fredericksburg, replacing part of SH 81.

On September 26, 1939, the section from Brady to Santa Anna was promptly reassigned to U.S. Highway 183. The section from San Antonio to Corpus Christi, which was cosigned with US 181, was cancelled. The section from Corpus Christi to Robstown was transferred to rerouted SH 44, south of Robstown to rerouted SH 96 (now US 77), and from there to Falfurrias became an extension of SH 285. The section from Sagerton to the Oklahoma state line was renumbered as SH 283 (this section was originally planned to stay as SH 16, while the section from San Antonio to Fredericksburg was planned to become an extension of SH 81, instead). The sections cosigned with other state highways had their codesignation of SH 16 removed. SH 16 was rerouted north to south of Graham, replacing SH 81 and part of SH 120, and rerouted south to US 281 south of San Antonio, replacing part of SH 9 (this was originally proposed as SH 287). SH 16 Spur was renumbered Spur 72.

On August 31, 1965, the road was significantly extended via its current routing to Zapata, replacing State Highway 346 from San Antonio to Jourdanton, and also replaced portions of SH 173 and FM 496. On November 16, 1965, it was rerouted over Interstate 410 in San Antonio. On January 31, 1969, SH 16 was extended north to US 281, replacing portions of SH 254 and FM 61.

The section of SH 16 from Loop 1604 to Eckhert Road (former FM 1517) was proposed for decommissioning in 2014 as part of TxDOT's San Antonio turnback proposal, which would have turned back over 129 miles of roads to the city of San Antonio. SH 16 would have been rerouted over Loop 1604, and Spur 421 and Spur 422 would have been extended over old SH 16. However, the city rejected the proposal.

== Future ==
The section of SH 16 between Loop 1604 and Triana Parkway in Helotes is in the process of being upgraded into a superstreet. The main focus of the project includes reconstructing the intersections at Loop 1604 and FM 1560 / Circle A Trail. Construction at the Loop 1604 intersection was projected to be finished sometime in 2019.

== Major intersections ==
County	Location	mi	km	Destinations	Notes
Zapata	Zapata	0.0	0.0	Future I-2 / US 83 west / FM 496 – Rio Grande City, Laredo	Southern terminus
Jim Hogg		26.0	41.8	FM 649 north – Mirando City	South end of FM 649 overlap
Jim Hogg	Randado	28.5	45.9	FM 649 south – Rio Grande City	North end of FM 649 overlap
Jim Hogg	South Fork Estates	49.0	78.9	FM 3073 west	
Jim Hogg	Hebbronville	51.1	82.2	SH 285 east – Falfurrias	
Jim Hogg	Hebbronville	51.5	82.9	SH 359 east (Galbraith Street) – San Diego	South end of SH 359 overlap
Jim Hogg	Hebbronville	51.9	83.5	SH 359 west (Viggie Street) – Laredo	North end of SH 359 overlap
Duval		70.3	113.1	FM 2295 east / FM 310 – Benavides	
Duval		88.3	142.1	SH 339 south – Benavides	
Duval	Freer	92.0	148.1	Future I-69W / US 59 / SH 44 – Laredo, San Diego, George West	U.S. 59 is the future Interstate 69W
Duval		101.4	163.2	FM 2359 east to US 59 (Future I-69W)	
McMullen		109.8	176.7	FM 624 – Cotulla, Orange Grove	
McMullen		117.2	188.6	FM 1962 east	
McMullen	Tilden	133.0	214.0	SH 72 east – Three Rivers, Choke Canyon State Park	South end of SH 72 overlap
McMullen		133.7	215.2	SH 72 west – Fowlerton	North end of SH 72 overlap
McMullen		135.8	218.5	FM 3445 east – James E. Daughtrey Wildlife Management Area	
McMullen		144.3	232.2	FM 791 east – Campbellton	
Atascosa		153.7	247.4	FM 3387 east	
Atascosa		155.8	250.7	FM 140 – Charlotte, Christine	
Atascosa	Jourdanton	163.9	263.8	FM 1332 west	
Atascosa	Jourdanton	164.8	265.2	SH 97 – Charlotte, Pleasanton	
Atascosa		166.2	267.5	Spur 162 west to SH 97	
Atascosa		166.4	267.8	SH 173 north – Devine	
Atascosa		168.1	270.5	FM 3350 east – Pleasanton, Pleasanton Municipal Airport	
Atascosa	Poteet	172.8	278.1	Loop 282 north – Poteet	
Atascosa	Poteet	174.3	280.5	Loop 282 south / FM 476 east – Poteet	South end of FM 476 overlap
Atascosa	Poteet	174.4	280.7	FM 476 west – Rossville	North end of FM 476 overlap
Bexar	San Antonio	187.3	301.4	Loop 1604 (Anderson Loop) – Somerset, Elmendorf	interchange
Bexar	San Antonio	190.1	305.9	Watson Road / Lone Star Pass - Toyota Plant	former Spur 66 east
Bexar	San Antonio	193.7	311.7	I-410 east / SH 130 north / Spur 422 north (Palo Alto Road) – Palo Alto College	South end of I-410 / SH 130 overlap; SH 16 south follows exit 49
Bexar	San Antonio	see I-410			
Bexar	San Antonio	209.7	337.5	I-410 north / Spur 421 south (Bandera Road) / Evers Road – San Antonio	Interchange; north end of I-410 overlap; SH 16 north follows exit 13
Bexar	Leon Valley	210.7	339.1	Wurzbach Road	
Bexar	Leon Valley	211.8	340.9	Spur 471 west (Grissom Road)	former FM 471 south
Bexar	San Antonio	212.8	342.5	Eckhert Road	former FM 1517 east
Bexar	San Antonio	216.8	348.9	Loop 1604 (Anderson Loop) to I-10 / FM 471 – University of Texas at San Antonio	interchange
Bexar	Helotes	217.8	350.5	FM 1560 north (Hausman Road)	South end of FM 1560 overlap
Bexar	Helotes	218.3	351.3	FM 1560 south	North end of FM 1560 overlap
Bexar		226.9	365.2	SH 211 south to FM 471	
Medina		228.9	368.4	PR 37 west – Medina Lake	
Bandera		236.5	380.6	SH 46 east – Boerne	
Bandera	Pipe Creek	239.4	385.3	FM 1283 south to PR 37 – Medina Lake	
Bandera	Bandera	248.4	399.8	SH 173 south – Hondo, Hill Country State Natural Area	South end of SH 173 overlap
Bandera	Bandera	248.9	400.6	SH 173 north – truck route to Kerrville	North end of SH 173 overlap
Bandera		251.2	404.3	FM 470 west – Tarpley, Utopia	
Bandera		259.5	417.6	RM 2828 east to SH 173 – Kerrville	
Bandera	Medina	262.1	421.8	RM 337 west – Vander Pool	
Bandera		265.5	427.3	FM 2107 west	
Kerr		277.5	446.6	FM 1273 west (Upper Turtle Creek Road)	
Kerr		278.7	448.5	FM 2771 east (Lower Turtle Creek Road / truck route) to SH 173	
Kerr	Kerrville	284.6	458.0	SH 173 south to Loop 534 – truck route to Bandera, Kerrville-Schreiner Regional Park	
Kerr	Kerrville	285.4	459.3	Loop 98 west (Thompson Drive South)	Access to Peterson Regional Medical Center
Kerr	Kerrville	285.7	459.8	SH 27 (Main Street) – Ingram, Schreiner University, Center Point	
Kerr	Kerrville	286.5	461.1	FM 1341 east (Golf Avenue)	
Kerr	Kerrville	287.7	463.0	Loop 534 (Veterans Highway) to SH 173 – Kerrville-Schreiner Regional Park, Airport	
Kerr	Kerrville	288.1	463.7	I-10 – Junction, San Antonio	I-10 exit 508
Gillespie	Fredericksburg	307.9	495.5	FM 2093 west	
Gillespie	Fredericksburg	310.1	499.1	US 87 north / US 290 west (Main Street) – Mason, Junction	South end of US 87 / US 290 overlap
Gillespie	Fredericksburg	310.2	499.2	US 87 south / US 290 east (Main Street) – San Antonio, Austin	North end of US 87 / US 290 overlap
Gillespie	Eckert	323.3	520.3	RM 1323 east – Willow City	
Llano		333.2	536.2	RM 965 south – Enchanted Rock State Natural Area	
Llano	Llano	346.9	558.3	RM 2323 south – Prairie Mountain	
Llano	Llano	347.0	558.4	SH 71 east – Austin	South end of SH 71 overlap
Llano	Llano	347.9	559.9	RM 152 west (Main Street) – Castell	
Llano	Llano	348.5	560.9	SH 29 / SH 71 west (Young Street) – Mason, Brady, Burnet	North end of SH 71 overlap
San Saba	Cherokee	365.1	587.6	RM 501 east – Bend	South end of RM 501 overlap
San Saba	Cherokee	365.2	587.7	RM 501 west – Pontotoc	North end of RM 501 overlap
San Saba	San Saba	380.8	612.8	US 190 – Brady, Lampasas	
San Saba		382.0	614.8	FM 1480 east – Pecan Grove	
San Saba		382.8	616.1	FM 500 west – Regency Bridge	
Mills		400.6	644.7	FM 3023	
Mills	Goldthwaite	402.1	647.1	US 183 south – Lampasas, Austin	south end of US 183 overlap
Mills	Goldthwaite	402.4	647.6	Loop 15 east to US 84 east / FM 572 – Waco	
Mills	Goldthwaite	402.8	648.2	FM 574 west	
Mills		403.9	650.0	US 84 east – Evant, Gatesville, Waco	south end of US 84 overlap
Mills	Durenville	405.1	651.9	US 84 west / US 183 north – Brownwood	north end of US 84 / US 183 overlap
Mills		418.1	672.9	FM 218 west – Zephyr	south end of FM 218 overlap
Mills	Priddy	419.6	675.3	FM 218 east – Pottsville, Hamilton	north end of FM 218 overlap
Comanche		425.9	685.4	FM 1476 north – Newburg	
Comanche		433.6	697.8	FM 3200 south	
Comanche	Comanche	435.6	701.0	FM 590 south – Zephyr	
Comanche	Comanche	436.3	702.2	US 67 / US 377 / SH 36	
Comanche	Comanche	436.9	703.1	FM 2247 north (West Wrights Avenue)	
Comanche	Comanche	437.8	704.6	FM 3381 east	
Comanche		441.6	710.7	FM 2861 east	
Comanche	Downing	445.8	717.4	FM 2318 east	south end of FM 2318 overlap
Comanche	Downing	446.2	718.1	FM 2318 west	north end of FM 2318 overlap
Comanche	De Leon	451.8	727.1	FM 587 west (West Sipe Springs Road)	
Comanche	De Leon	452.8	728.7	SH 6 east (East Navarro Street) – Dublin	south end of SH 6 overlap
Comanche	De Leon	453.5	729.8	SH 6 west – Gorman	north end of SH 6 overlap
Comanche		454.2	731.0	FM 2921 west	
Comanche		460.2	740.6	FM 2156 east – Victor	
Eastland	Desdemona	464.4	747.4	FM 8 – Gorman, Eastland, Stephenville	
Eastland		480.6	773.5	I-20 – Abilene, Fort Worth	I-20 exit 361
Palo Pinto	Strawn	484.2	779.2	FM 2372 west / Davidson Cemetery Road	
Palo Pinto	Strawn	484.5	779.7	SH 108 south – Mingus	
Palo Pinto		485.4	781.2	FM 207 west – Necessity	
Palo Pinto	Metcalf Gap	496.3	798.7	US 180 east – Palo Pinto, Mineral Wells	south end of US 180 overlap
Palo Pinto	Brad	501.1	806.4	US 180 west – Breckenridge, Possum Kingdom State Park	north end of US 180 overlap
Palo Pinto		512.4	824.6	FM 2353 north – Possum Kingdom Lake, Camp Constantin, Camp Grady Spruce, B.R.A. Lake Office	
Palo Pinto		514.7	828.3	PR 36 west – Possum Kingdom Lake, Camp Constantin	
Palo Pinto		516.6	831.4	SH 254 east – Graford	
Palo Pinto		518.5	834.4	FM 2353 south – Possum Kingdom Lake, B.R.A. Lake Office	
Palo Pinto		523.2	842.0	Loop 533 north	
Palo Pinto		523.4	842.3	SH 337 south – Graford, Mineral Wells	
Palo Pinto		524.3	843.8	Loop 533 south	
Young		526.3	847.0	FM 1191 north	
Young	Graham	535.8	862.3	FM 1287 south – Ivan	
Young	Graham	538.7	867.0	US 380 east / SH 67 south – Fort Belknap	south end of US 380 overlap
Young	Graham	538.8	867.1	US 380 west – Throckmorton	north end of US 380 overlap
Young	Graham	539.8	868.7	FM 2652 north	
Young	Graham	540.1	869.2	FM 3491 south	
Young		544.4	876.1	FM 2075 east	
Young	Loving	550.8	886.4	SH 114 – Olney, Jacksboro	
Young	Markley	558.6	899.0	FM 1769 south	
Archer		567.5	913.3	US 281 – Wichita Falls, Jacksboro	Northern terminus
1.000 mi = 1.609 km; 1.000 km = 0.621 mi

== See also ==
- List of state highways in Texas
