= Texas State Highway 193 =

State highway in Texas

State Highway 193
- SH 193, highlighted in red

Route information
- Maintained by TxDOT
- Length: 6.48 mi (10.43 km)
- Existed: by 1933–present

Major junctions
- West end: SH 108 at Mingus
- East end: I-20 near Gordon

Location
- Country: United States
- State: Texas

Highway system
- Highways in Texas; Interstate; US; State; Former; Toll; Loops; Spurs; FM/RM; Park; Rec
← SH 192	→ SH 194

State Highway 193 (SH 193) is a short state highway that runs from Mingus east through Gordon to Interstate 20. This route was originally designated by 1933.

== Route description ==
SH 193 begins at an intersection with SH 108 in Mingus, Palo Pinto County, heading east on a two-lane undivided road. The road passes a few homes and leaves Mingus, running to the south of a Union Pacific railroad line as it heads through areas of fields. The highway heads into wooded areas and turns northeast, becoming West Cedar Street. SH 193 curves east and enters Gordon, passing homes while continuing to the south of the railroad tracks. In the center of town, the road crosses FM 919 and becomes East Cedar Street. The highway leaves Gordon and turns southeast away from the Union Pacific line, passing through wooded areas with a few fields. SH 193 continues southeast to its eastern terminus at an interchange with I-20.

== History ==
SH 193 was created on February 8, 1933 to run from Mingus east through Gordon to an intersection with US 80 (now I-20).

== Major intersections ==
The entire route is in Palo Pinto County.

Location	mi	km	Destinations	Notes
Mingus	0.000	0.000	SH 108 (Patrick Street)	
Gordon			FM 919	
Gordon	6.477	10.424	I-20	I-20 exit 373
1.000 mi = 1.609 km; 1.000 km = 0.621 mi
