= Hampton, Texas =

- City
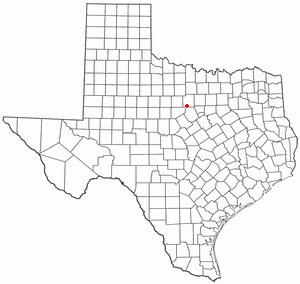
- Location of Hampton, Texas
- Coordinates: 32°32′39″N 98°21′58″W
- Country: United States
- State: Texas
- County: Palo Pinto

Area
  - Total: 0.19 sq mi (0.5 km^{2})
  - Land: 0.19 sq mi (0.5 km^{2})
  - Water: 0 sq mi (0.0 km^{2})
- Elevation: 968 ft (295 m)

Population (1875)
  - Total: 150
  - Density: 0/sq mi (0/km^{2})
- Time zone: UTC-6 (Central (CST))
  - Summer (DST): UTC-5 (CDT)
- Area code: 254

Hampton was a town in Palo Pinto County, Texas, United States. The town was moved south one mile to a nearby railroad and renamed Gordon in 1881.

== Geography ==
Hampton was located at 32°34′03″N 98°21′51″W (32.56747, -98.98.36420).

== History ==
The town of Hampton was settled around the year 1864, one mile north of present-day Gordon, Texas. Hampton was a wood-structured town on the frontier. A post office opened its doors in 1879, with Robert Rogan appointed as postmaster. Mr. Rogan and a Mr. Cotney were early town businessmen. Jess Neblet was the first merchant selling groceries and dry goods in town. On the religious scene, the First Baptist Church of Hampton was organized 1879, with the Methodist Church following a few months later.

Just as Hampton was beginning to thrive, the Texas and Pacific Railway started making its way through southern Palo Pinto County. The new railroad was part of the largest single expansion of the Texas and Pacific system, linking Fort Worth to Sierra Blanca; and it occurred between 1880 and 1881. The track did not go through Hampton proper but was located about a mile south of town. Town leaders met and decided that it would be best for the community to move closer to the railroad and take advantage of what it had to offer. Town leaders included the likes of Albert Lusk, Ben Foster, Jess Neblet, Jim Moore, John Moore, Tod Wood, Alf Beckham, Jasper Odan, Jeff Cowden, and Dock Abels.

By late 1881 Hampton was full-swing in the process of relocation to the railroad town of Gordon. Records indicate that the First Baptist Church relocated to Gordon in late 1881 and the Methodist Church made the move in early 1882. The Hampton post office was one of the last official re-locations when it was moved to Gordon, re-opening there on October 17, 1883.

== Education ==
The area in which Hampton was located is served by the Gordon Independent School District.
