= Texas State Highway 108 =

State highway in Texas

State Highway 108
- SH 108, highlighted in red

Route information
- Maintained by TxDOT
- Length: 33.21 mi (53.45 km)
- Existed: 1926–present

Major junctions
- South end: US 281 at Stephenville
- US 377 at Stephenville; US 67 at Stephenville; I-20 near Gordon
- North end: SH 16 at Strawn

Location
- Country: United States
- State: Texas

Highway system
- Highways in Texas; Interstate; US; State; Former; Toll; Loops; Spurs; FM/RM; Park; Rec
← SH 107	→ SH 109

State Highway 108 (SH 108) is a state highway that runs from Strawn to Stephenville.

== Route description ==
SH 108 begins at an intersection with SH 16 in downtown Strawn, and travels east out of town on Housley Street. The highway turns south in Mingus, where it intersects SH 193. South of Mingus, the highway intersects and briefly travels east with Interstate 20. The route then departs to the southeast, where it reaches Stephenville. The route intersects U.S. Routes 67 and 377 in Stephenville, before reaching its southern terminus at U.S. Route 281 just south of Stephenville.

== Route history ==
A highway was originally designated on March 16, 1925 from Thurber to Lampasas, but it did not take effect until conditions were met. On June 22, 1925, a branch to Chalk Mountain was added. SH 108 was originally designated on July 13, 1925, from Lampasas to San Antonio, with one section replacing a section of SH 46. On March 8, 1926, SH 108 was extended north to Strawn, with a branch to Chalk Mountain added. On June 24, 1931, the section south of Strawn was redesignated as the new state-length SH 66, and the rest was cancelled in exchange of mileage. On July 22, 1932, the section of SH 108 from Stephenville to Strawn was restored. SH 108 has followed the same routing since that time.

State Highway 108A was a spur routing of SH 108 that led from Lampasas east to Rosebud. The route was designated on March 16, 1925, and numbered on March 8, 1926. On March 19, 1930, the route had been renumbered as SH 53 (now US 190).

== Major intersections ==
County	Location	mi	km	Destinations	Notes
Erath		0.00	0.00	US 281 – Hico, Stephenville	
Erath	Stephenville			US 67 / US 377 (W South Loop) – Bluff Dale, Dublin	
Erath	Stephenville			Bus. US 377	
Palo Pinto	Gordon			I-20 east – Weatherford, Fort Worth	Eastern end of I-20 concurrency Diamond interchange with frontage roads; exit 370 on I-20
Erath				I-20 west – Ranger, Abilene	Western end of I-20 concurrency Diamond interchange with frontage roads; exit 367 on I-20
Palo Pinto	Mingus			SH 193 east – Gordon	Western terminus of SH 193
Palo Pinto	Strawn			SH 16 – Graham, De Leon	
1.000 mi = 1.609 km; 1.000 km = 0.621 mi: Concurrency terminus
