= Culebra Road =

Culebra Road is a street in Bexar County, Texas, near San Antonio. It is signed as part of three separate state highways:

- Texas State Highway Spur 421
- Farm to Market Road 471
- Farm to Market Road 3487
