= Brazos, Texas =

Unincorporated community in Texas, US

Coordinates: 32°39′41″N 98°07′28″W

Brazos is an unincorporated community and census designated place (CDP) in southeastern Palo Pinto County, Texas, United States. As of the 2020 census, Brazos had a population of 112. The community is on the Brazos River approximately seven miles south of Mineral Wells.

== Education ==
Public education in the community is provided by the Santo Independent School District.

== Demographics ==
Historical population
Census	Pop.	Note	%±
2020	112		—
U.S. Decennial Census; 1850–1900 1910; 1920 1930 1940; 1950 1960 1970; 1980 1990 2000; 2010 2020

Brazos first appeared as a census designated place in the 2020 U.S. census.

=== 2020 Census ===
Brazos CDP, Texas – Racial and ethnic composition Note: the US Census treats Hispanic/Latino as an ethnic category. This table excludes Latinos from the racial categories and assigns them to a separate category. Hispanics/Latinos may be of any race.
Race / Ethnicity (NH = Non-Hispanic)	Pop 2020	% 2020
White alone (NH)	90	80.36%
Black or African American alone (NH)	0	0.00%
Native American or Alaska Native alone (NH)	0	0.00%
Asian alone (NH)	0	0.00%
Native Hawaiian or Pacific Islander alone (NH)	0	0.00%
Other race alone (NH)	0	0.00%
Mixed race or Multiracial (NH)	3	2.68%
Hispanic or Latino (any race)	19	16.96%
Total	112	100.00%
