= Santo, Texas =

Santo
- Unincorporated community Census designated place
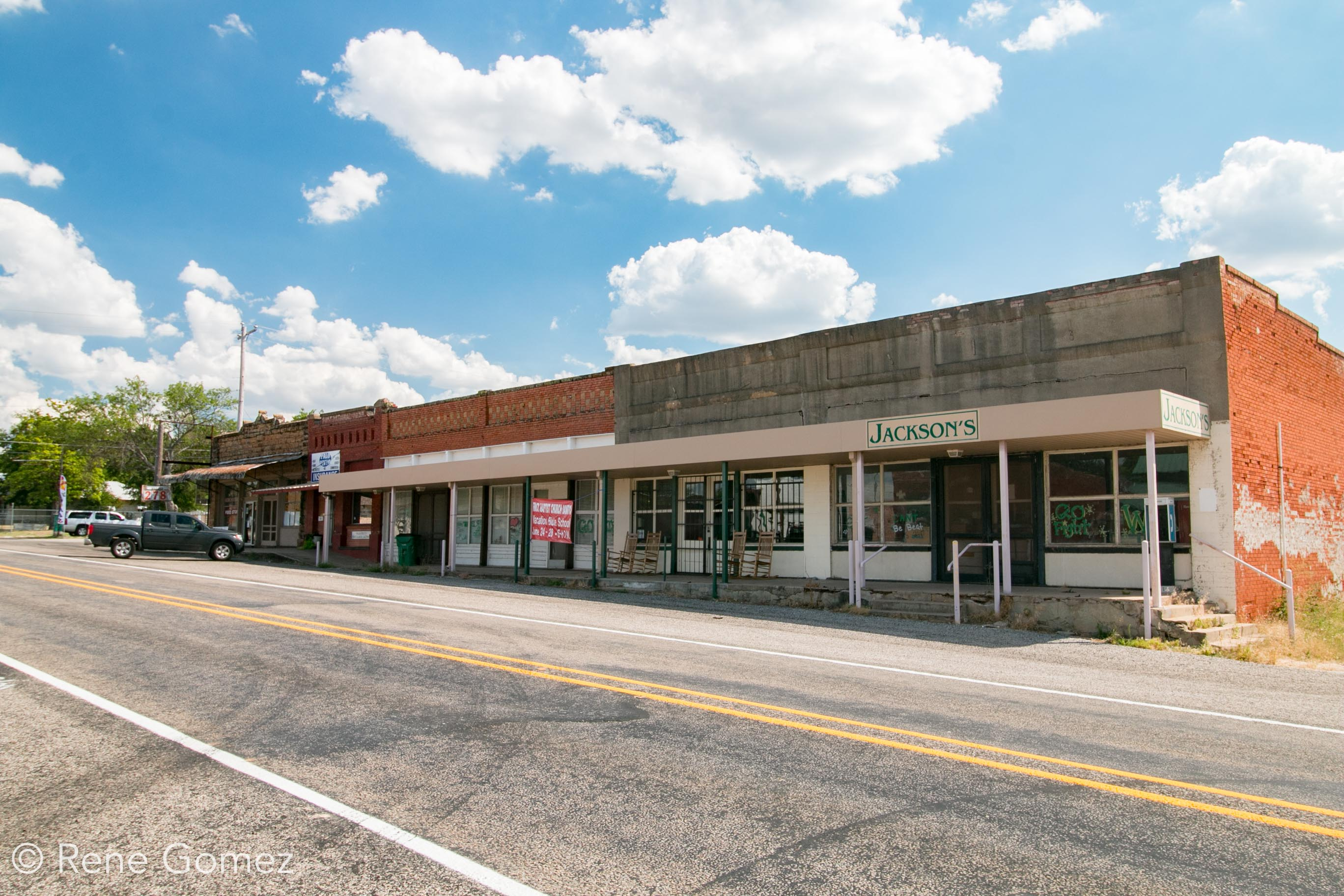

- Location within the state of Texas Santo (the United States)
- Coordinates: 32°36′20″N 98°12′50″W
- Country: United States
- State: Texas
- County: Palo Pinto

Area
  - Total: 1.20 sq mi (3.12 km^{2})
- Elevation: 817 ft (249 m)

Population (2008)
  - Total: 315
  - Density: 261/sq mi (101/km^{2})
- Time zone: UTC-6 (Central (CST))
  - Summer (DST): UTC-5 (CDT)
- ZIP codes: 76472
- Area code: 940
- GNIS feature ID: 2805830

Santo is an unincorporated community and census designated place (CDP) in Palo Pinto County, Texas, United States. It lies on Farm to Market Road 4, 14 miles south of Palo Pinto, and as of the 2020 census had a population of 347.

== Education ==
The Santo Independent School District serves area students.

== Demographics ==
Historical population
Census	Pop.	Note	%±
2020	347		—
U.S. Decennial Census; 1850–1900 1910; 1920 1930 1940; 1950 1960 1970; 1980 1990 2000; 2010 2020

Santo first appeared as a census designated place in the 2020 U.S. census.

=== 2020 Census ===
Santo CDP, Texas – Racial and ethnic composition Note: the US Census treats Hispanic/Latino as an ethnic category. This table excludes Latinos from the racial categories and assigns them to a separate category. Hispanics/Latinos may be of any race.
Race / Ethnicity (NH = Non-Hispanic)	Pop 2020	% 2020
White alone (NH)	296	85.30%
Black or African American alone (NH)	0	0.00%
Native American or Alaska Native alone (NH)	1	0.29%
Asian alone (NH)	2	0.58%
Native Hawaiian or Pacific Islander alone (NH)	0	0.00%
Other race alone (NH)	1	0.29%
Mixed race or Multiracial (NH)	11	3.17%
Hispanic or Latino (any race)	36	10.37%
Total	347	100.00%
