= Strawn Independent School District =

School district in Texas

Coordinates: 32°32′50.0″N 98°29′47.6″W

Location
- Strawn, TX ESC Region 11 USA

District information
- Type: Public
- Grades: Pre-K through 12
- Superintendent: Dewaine Lee

Students and staff
- Students: 187 (2016-2017 academic year)
- Athletic conference: UIL Class A (six-man football participant)
- District mascot: Greyhounds/Lady Greyhounds
- Colors: Red and Black

Other information
- Website: www.strawnschool.net

Strawn Independent School District is a public school district based in Strawn, Texas, United States. The district consists of one campus consisting of prekindergarten through grade 12.

Strawn High School has won five UIL six-man football championships. (2003, 2008, 2017, 2018, and 2021. The 2008 title was in Division I).

== Academic achievement ==
In 2009, the school district was rated "academically acceptable" by the Texas Education Agency.

== Special programs ==
=== Athletics ===
Strawn High School plays six-man football. The team was featured on the CBS documentary, Texas 6, which ran for two seasons, chronicling the 2019 and 2020 seasons. It has a total of 16 episodes and was placed on CBS All Access.

== See also ==
- List of school districts in Texas
- List of high schools in Texas
