= Texas State Highway Spur 422 =

State highway in Texas

State Highway Spur 422
- Poteet-Jourdanton Freeway

Route information
- Maintained by TxDOT
- Length: 1.660 mi (2.672 km)
- Existed: 1965–present

Major junctions
- South end: I-410 / SH 16
- North end: I-35

Location
- Country: United States
- State: Texas
- Counties: Bexar

Highway system
- Highways in Texas; Interstate; US; State; Former; Toll; Loops; Spurs; FM/RM; Park; Rec
← Spur 421	→ Spur 423

State Highway Spur 422 (Spur 422) is a state highway spur in San Antonio, Texas. It is known locally as the Poteet-Jourdanton Freeway.

== Route description ==
Spur 422 begins at an intersection with Loop 410 and SH 16, near Palo Alto College. Northbound SH 16 follows westbound Loop 410, while northbound Spur 422 continues north along the Poteet-Jourdanton Freeway. The short route ends at an intersection with I-35.

== History ==
Spur 422 is a former route of SH 16, and was designated (along with Spur 421) on November 16, 1965, after SH 16 was rerouted around the west side of San Antonio along the Loop 410 freeway.

Originally, the highway had a direct interchange with I-35 at its northern end. There are still many stubs, bridges, and grading for the ramps.

== Major intersections ==
The entire route is in San Antonio, Bexar County.

mi	km	Destinations	Notes
0.0	0.0	I-410 / SH 16 / SH 130	Southern terminus; continues south as SH 16; I-410 exit 49
0.4	0.64	West Villaret Boulevard	
0.7	1.1	Gillette Boulevard	
1.0	1.6	Hunter Boulevard	
1.3	2.1	Patron Drive	
1.6	2.6	I-35 (Pan Am Expressway) – San Antonio	Northern terminus; continues north as Palo Alto Road; I-35 exit 148
1.000 mi = 1.609 km; 1.000 km = 0.621 mi

== See also ==
- List of highways in San Antonio, Texas
- List of state highway spurs in Texas
