= Markley, Texas =

Unincorporated community in Texas, US

Coordinates: 33°21′30″N 98°26′53″W

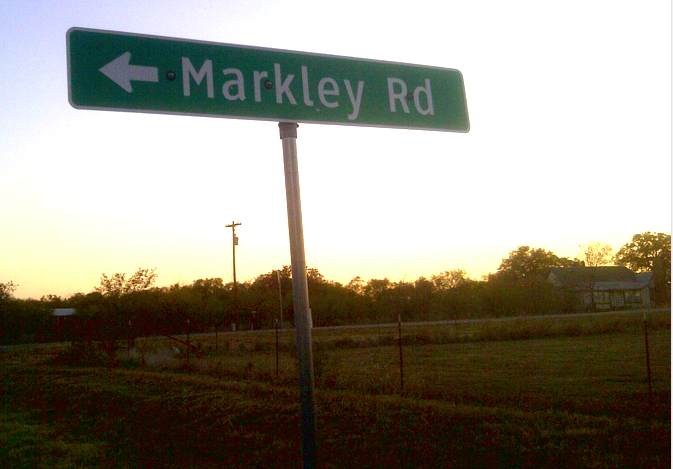
Markley, Texas

Markley is an unincorporated community in Young County, Texas, United States. It is located at the intersection of State Highway 16 and Farm to Market Road 1769, in the northeastern corner of Young County, approximately 21 miles from Graham. As of the 2000 Census, the population was estimated to be 50.

== History ==
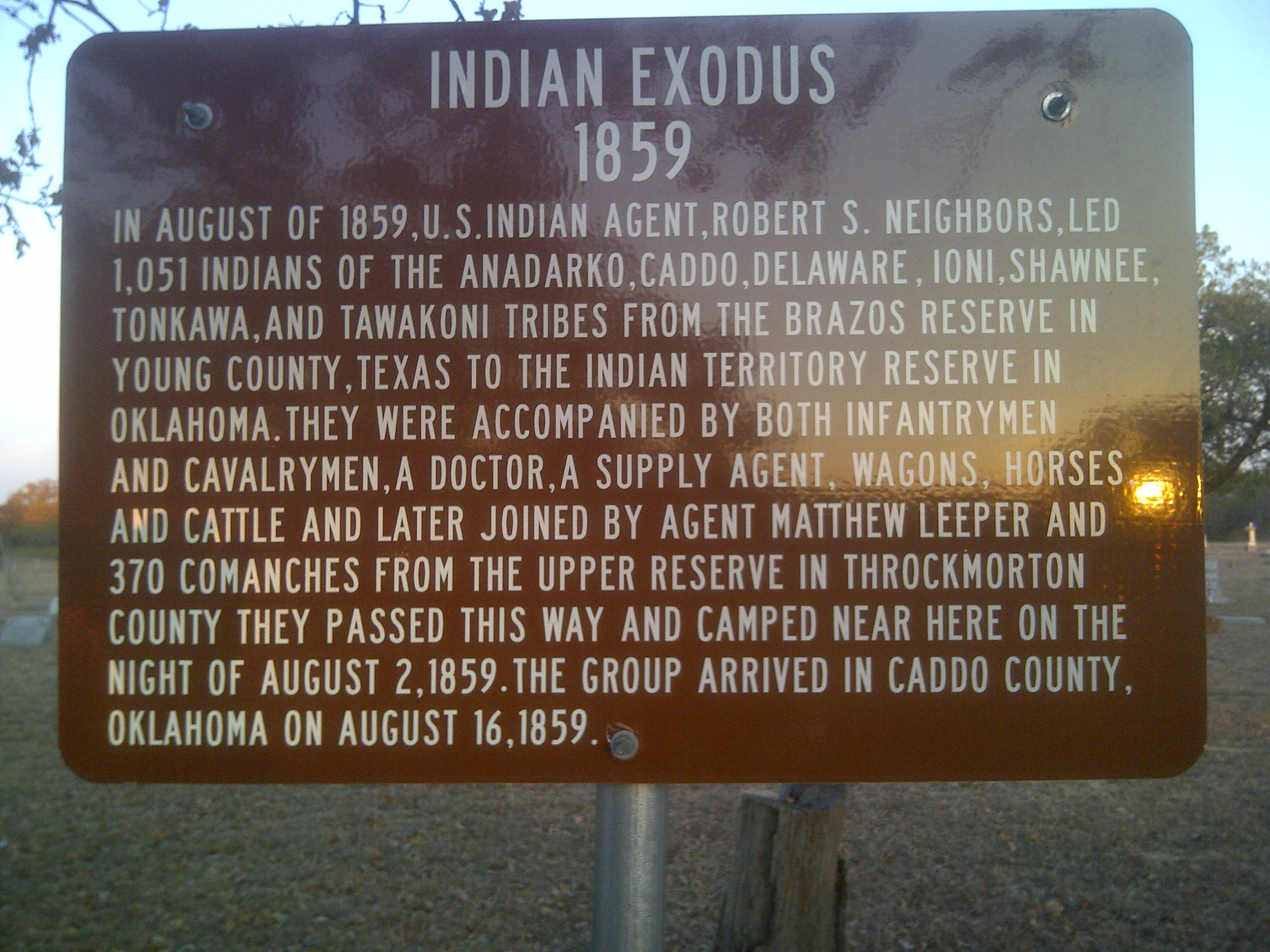
Indian Exodus

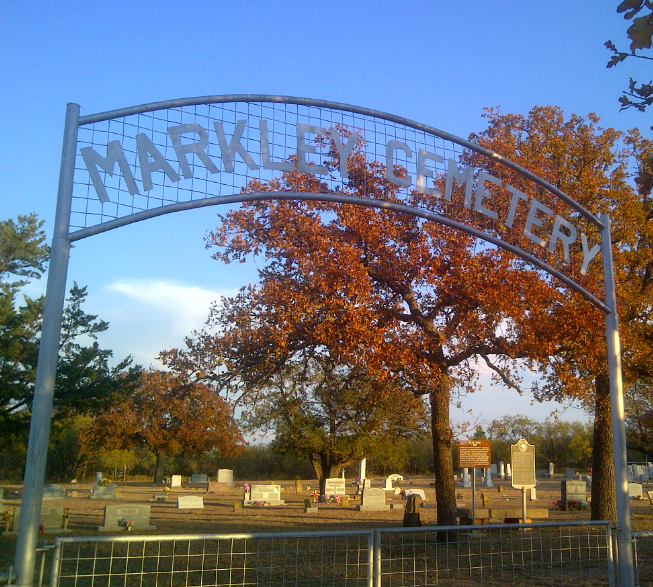
Markley cemetery

Markley was founded in 1888 and was originally known as Plum Grove. That year, a post office named Manlee was established there with Steve Munderbeck as postmaster. Other early postmasters included: John Wellington, James McDaniel, W.W. Gregg, and Myra Connelly. By 1890, the original name given to the community, Plum Grove, was changed to Markley to honor General A. C. Markley who had settled in Young County. Markley grew slowly until oil was discovered there in the early 1900s. By the 1920s, it possessed several churches, businesses as well as its own school, and a bank. The community of Markley continues to be an oil-producing area as new wells are still being drilled today.

Even before Markey was officially a town, the location was a known camping spot and was used as a layover during the Indian exodus in 1859. This event marked the end of the Indian tribes time on the Brazos reservation as they were moved to Indian territory. The Indians were accompanied by wagons, supplies, soldiers, supply agents and others.

The Markley cemetery was begun in 1888 next to the old Plum Grove School. The first burial there was of M.C. Norfleet. After ten years, the burial ground was no longer being cared for, so in 1890, a group of citizens from the surrounding rural community including J. C. Calvin, J.W. Cox, R.E. Currie, S.G. Dean, Nelson Owen, M.A. Stewart, Andy and Ike Tinney, J.M. Wallace, and W.M. Watson, organized an annual "Graveyard Working Day".

The working day was scheduled for the first Saturday in May. During this time, residents from the surrounding area came by wagon and horseback. After cleaning the area, the practice of placing flowers on the graves was performed. In 1925, the observation was changed to the first Sunday in May. Today, there is a cemetery association that provides care for the cemetery yet Decoration Day continues as an annual social event bringing dozens of people from far away to pay respect to those buried there.

== Education ==
Markley's students are served by the Graham Independent School District.
