= Santo Independent School District =

School district in Texas

Santo Independent School District is a public school district based in the community of Santo, Texas (USA).

Located in Palo Pinto County, the district extends into small portions of Parker and Erath counties.

Santo ISD has two campuses - Santo High (Grades 6–12) and Santo Elementary (Grades PK-5).

In 2009, the school district was rated "recognized" by the Texas Education Agency.

== Controversy ==
In July 2024, the ACLU of Texas sent Santo Independent School District a letter, alleging that the district's 2023-2024 dress and grooming code appeared to violate the Texas CROWN Act, a state law which prohibits racial discrimination based on hair texture or styles, and asking the district to revise its policies for the 2024-2025 school year.
