= Kerrville-Schreiner Park =

Developed recreational area on the Guadalupe River in Kerrville, Texas

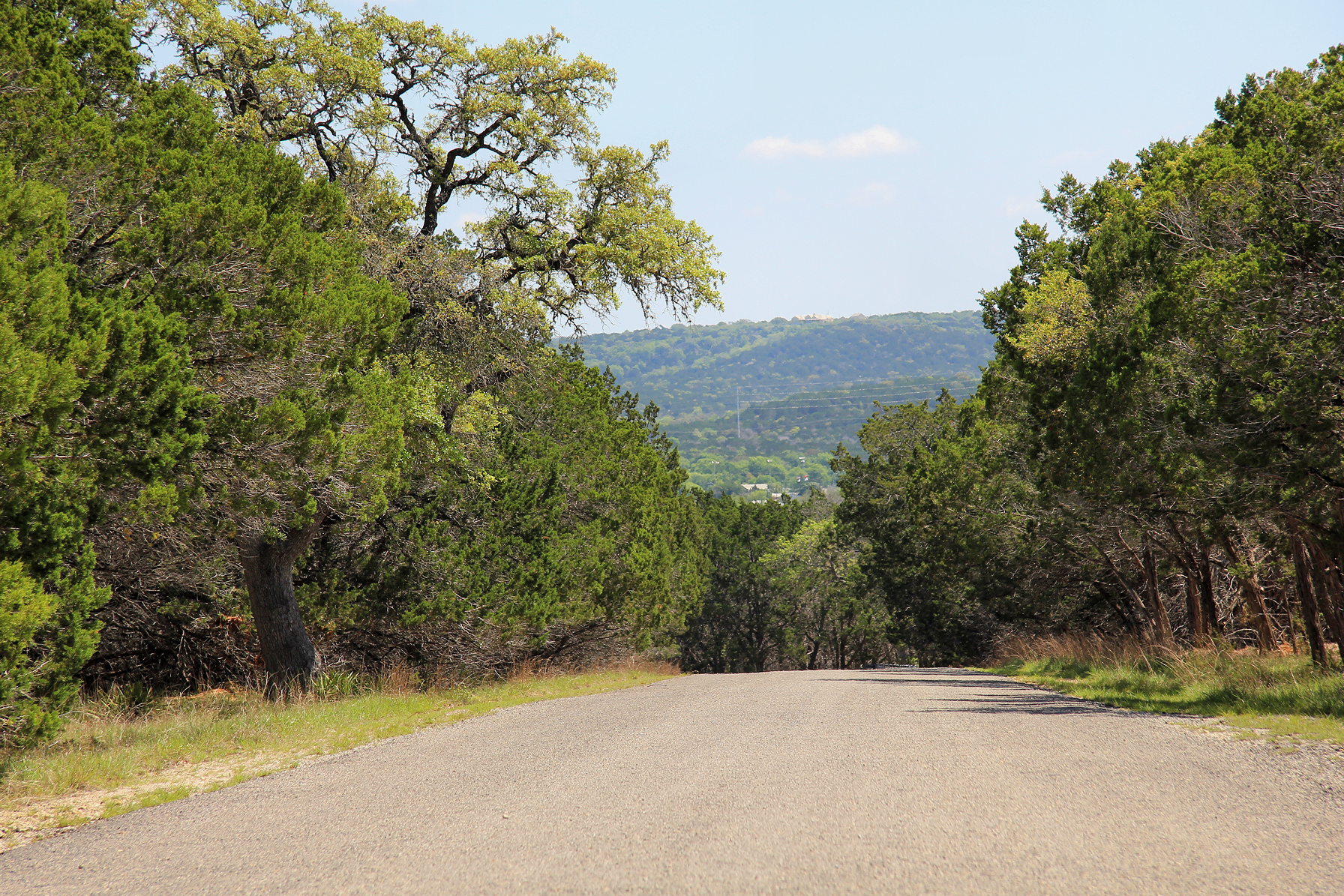
- Upland woodlands in Kerrville-Schreiner Park

- Location within Texas
- Location: Kerr County, Texas
- Nearest city: Kerrville
- Coordinates: 30°0′39″N 99°7′14″W
- Area: 517 acres (209 ha)
- Established: 1936
- Governing body: City of Kerrville

Kerrville-Schreiner Park is a developed recreational area on the Guadalupe River in Kerrville, Texas, United States. Originally, a Texas state park developed by the Civilian Conservation Corps (CCC) between 1935 and 1937, the state transferred the park to the City of Kerrville in 2004.

== History ==
In 1934, the City of Kerrville donated 517 acres to the State Parks Board for development of a state park. CCC Company 1823CV arrived in January 1935 to begin construction on project SP-58. The company stayed until May 1937. CCC work at the park included building the park road, culverts, and other park infrastructure. the caretaker's dwelling, garage, a storage facility with water storage tank and entrance portals.

The park was originally called Kerrville State Park. The Texas Parks and Wildlife Department Commissioners changed the name to Kerrville-Schreiner State Park in 1990. On February 13, 2004, the park transferred back to the City of Kerrville under authority of Texas House Bill 2108.

== Flora and fauna ==
The park is home to an abundance of wildlife including white-tailed deer and blackbuck, axis deer, rabbits, fox, birds, and butterflies. The butterfly garden in the park is a certified monarch waystation.
