= Gordon Independent School District =

School district in Texas

Coordinates: 32.5514°N 98.3709°W

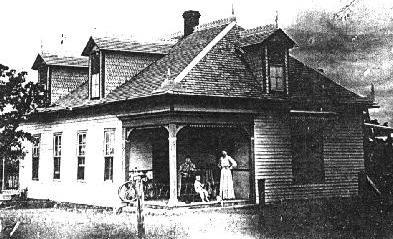
- First school building in Gordon, Texas

Address
- 112 Rusk Street ESC Region 11 Gordon, Palo Pinto County, Texas, 76453; USA

District information
- Type: Public, Independent school district
- Grades: Pre-K through 12
- Established: 1882
- Superintendent: Holly Campbell
- Schools: 1
- Budget: $2.17 million (2015-2016)
- NCES District ID: 4821180

Students and staff
- Students: 182 (2017-2018)
- Teachers: 20.24 (2017-2018)
- Staff: 32.14 (2017-2018)
- Colors: Black & Gold

Other information
- Mascot: Longhorn
- Website: Gordon ISD

Gordon Independent School District is a public school district based in Gordon, Texas (USA).

Located in Palo Pinto County, the district serves the city of Mingus and extends into a small portion of northern Erath County. Gordon ISD was rated Exemplary by the Texas Education Agency in 2009 making it the only K-12 district in the county with the high honor.

In 2009, the school district was rated "exemplary" by the Texas Education Agency.

== History ==
The Gordon Independent School District was organized in 1882 and began as a one-room school. Miss Mollie Shelton was the school's first teacher.

The district changed to a four-day school week in fall 2019.

== Athletics ==
Gordon High School plays six-man football, and have won five state championships: 1996, 1999, 2023,, 2024 and 2025.

Gordon High School offers Basketball (boys, girls), Baseball (boys), Softball (girls), Tennis (boys, girls), Golf (boys, girls) and Track (boys, girls).

== See also ==
- List of school districts in Texas
