= Texas State Highway Spur 421 =

State highway in Texas

State Highway Spur 421

Route information
- Maintained by TxDOT
- Length: 6.013 mi (9.677 km)
- Existed: 1965–present

Major junctions
- South end: I-10 / US 87 in San Antonio
- North end: I-410 / SH 16 in Leon Valley

Location
- Country: United States
- State: Texas
- Counties: Bexar

Highway system
- Highways in Texas; Interstate; US; State; Former; Toll; Loops; Spurs; FM/RM; Park; Rec
| ← Loop 420 | → Spur 422 |

State Highway Spur 421 (Spur 421) is a state highway spur in the San Antonio, Texas, USA metropolitan area.

== Route description ==
Spur 421 begins at an intersection with I-10 north of Downtown San Antonio. The route follows Culebra Road to the west before turning to the northwest along Bandera Road. The designation ends at Loop 410 and SH 16; southbound SH 16 follows the Loop 410 freeway, while northbound SH 16 continues along Bandera Road.

== History ==
Spur 421 is a former route of SH 16, and was designated (along with Spur 422) on November 16, 1965, after SH 16 was rerouted around the west side of San Antonio along the Loop 410 freeway. The section of Spur 421 south of Callaghan Road was proposed for decommissioning in 2014 (Spur 421 would have also replaced the section of SH 16 north to Eckhert Road as well) as part of TxDOT's San Antonio turnback proposal, which would have turned back over 129 miles of roads to the city of San Antonio, but the city of San Antonio rejected that proposal.

== Major intersections ==
The entire route is in Bexar County.

| Location | mi | km | Destinations | Notes |
|---|---|---|---|---|
| San Antonio | 0.0 | 0.0 | I-10 / US 87 | Southern terminus; continues as Culebra Road |
| San Antonio | 0.6 | 0.97 | Zarzamora Street | |
| San Antonio | 1.5 | 2.4 | 24th Street / Wilson Boulevard | |
| San Antonio | 1.6 | 2.6 | Bandera Road / Culebra Road west – St. Mary's University | Route continues along Bandera Road |
| San Antonio | 2.1 | 3.4 | Cincinnati Avenue – Woodlawn Lake | |
| San Antonio | 2.3 | 3.7 | General McMullen Drive / Saint Cloud Road | |
| San Antonio | 2.6 | 4.2 | Woodlawn Avenue | |
| San Antonio | 3.9 | 6.3 | Hillcrest Drive | |
| San Antonio | 4.8 | 7.7 | Evers Road | |
| San Antonio | 5.2 | 8.4 | Callaghan Road | |
| Leon Valley | 6.0 | 9.7 | I-410 (Connally Loop) / SH 16 south | |
| Leon Valley | | | SH 16 north (Bandera Road) | Northern terminus and continuation |
1.000 mi = 1.609 km; 1.000 km = 0.621 mi

== See also ==
- List of highways in San Antonio, Texas
- List of state highway spurs in Texas
