= Palo Pinto Independent School District =

School district in Texas

Coordinates: 32.7672°N 98.3035°W

Location
- Palo Pinto, Texas; United States

District information
- Type: Public (PreK-6 grades only)
- Motto: Our students will be prepared to meet the challenges in their lives.
- Enrollment: 111

Other information
- Website: www.palopintoisd.net

Palo Pinto Independent School District is a public school district based in the community of Palo Pinto, Texas (USA).

The district has one school that serves students in Pre-Kindergarten (Pre-K) through sixth grade.

The district changed to a four day school week in fall 2022.
