= Strawn, Texas =

- City
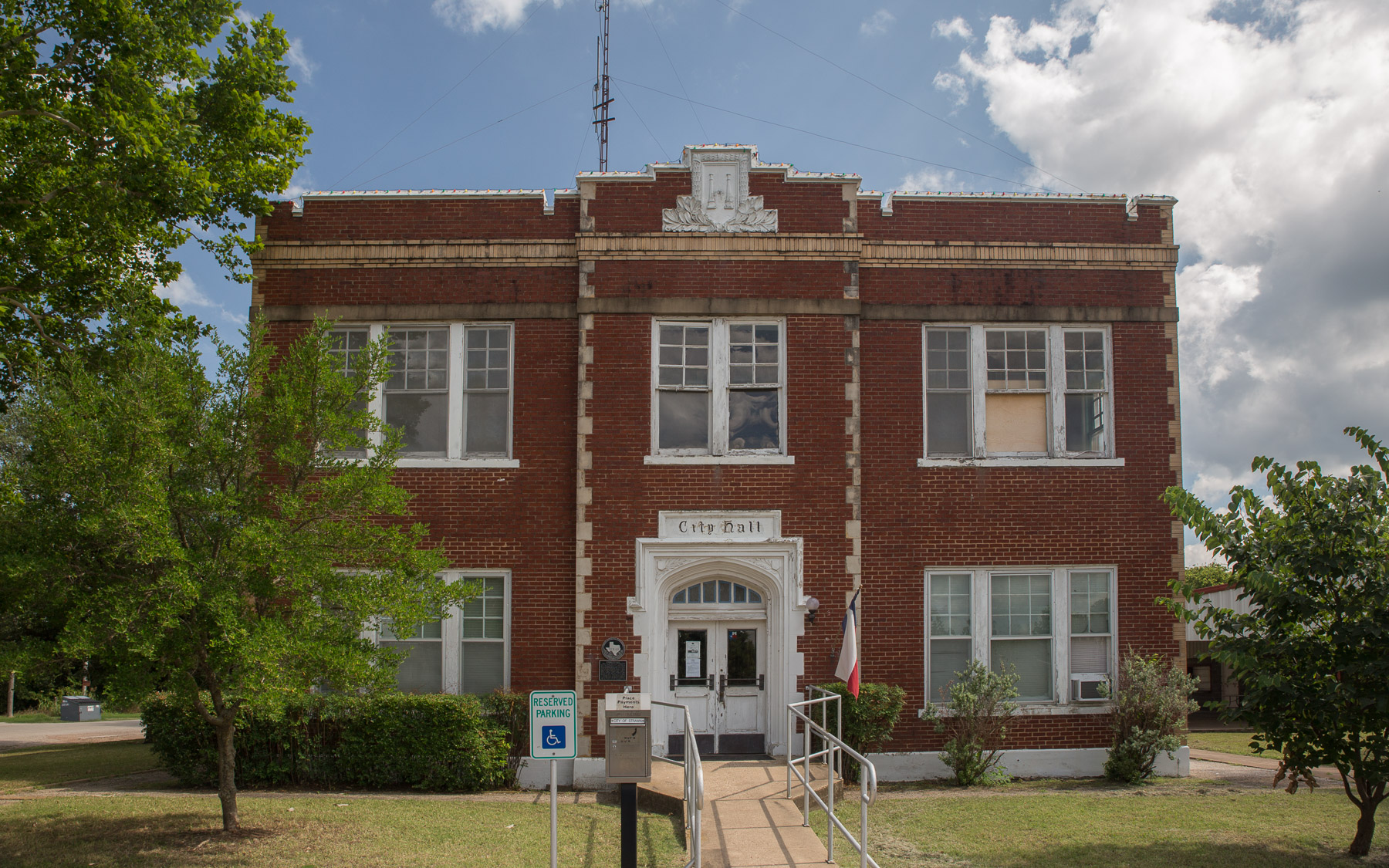
- City Hall

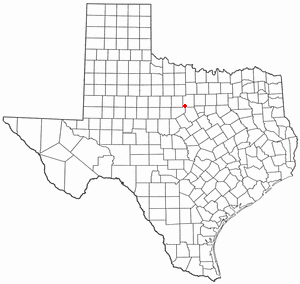
- Location of Strawn, Texas

- Coordinates: 32°33′02″N 98°29′59″W
- Country: United States
- State: Texas
- County: Palo Pinto

Area
  - Total: 0.78 sq mi (2.03 km^{2})
  - Land: 0.78 sq mi (2.02 km^{2})
  - Water: 0.0077 sq mi (0.02 km^{2})
- Elevation: 1,004 ft (306 m)

Population (2020)
  - Total: 540
  - Density: 690/sq mi (270/km^{2})
- Time zone: UTC-6 (Central (CST))
  - Summer (DST): UTC-5 (CDT)
- ZIP code: 76475
- Area code: 254
- FIPS code: 48-70580
- GNIS feature ID: 2411989
- Website: strawntx.com

Strawn is a city in Palo Pinto County, Texas, United States. Its population was 540 at the 2020 census. Strawn, on State Highway 16 and 108, Farm to Market Road 2372, and the Missouri Pacific Railroad in southwestern Palo Pinto County, was one of several towns developed about 1880 when the Texas and Pacific Railway began service. The site, known earlier as North Fork for its location on Palo Pinto Creek, was laid out on the land of two early ranchers, Stephen Bethel Strawn and James N. Stuart. Stuart built the area's first house in 1875. A community to the west, Russell's Pocket, and one to the east, Davidsonville, were merged to form Strawn.

== Geography ==
According to the United States Census Bureau, the city has a total area of 0.8 square miles (2.1 km^{2}), all land.

=== Climate ===
The climate in this area is characterized by hot, humid summers and generally mild to cool winters. According to the Köppen climate classification, Strawn has a humid subtropical climate, Cfa on climate maps.

== Demographics ==
Historical population
Census	Pop.	Note	%±
1890	514		—
1920	2,457		—
1930	1,429		−41.8%
1940	1,107		−22.5%
1950	922		−16.7%
1960	817		−11.4%
1970	786		−3.8%
1980	694		−11.7%
1990	709		2.2%
2000	739		4.2%
2010	653		−11.6%
2020	540		−17.3%
U.S. Decennial Census

=== 2020 census ===
As of the 2020 census, Strawn had a population of 540. The median age was 41.1 years, 19.1% of residents were under the age of 18, and another 19.1% were 65 years of age or older. For every 100 females, there were 100.7 males, and for every 100 females age 18 and over there were 96.8 males age 18 and over.

0.0% of residents lived in urban areas, while 100.0% lived in rural areas.

There were 239 households in Strawn, including 185 families; 31.4% had children under 18 living in them. Of all households, 41.8% were married-couple households, 23.4% were households with a male householder and no spouse or partner present, and 29.7% were households with a female householder and no spouse or partner present. About 31.8% of all households were made up of individuals and 15.5% had someone living alone who was 65 years of age or older.

There were 302 housing units, of which 20.9% were vacant. The homeowner vacancy rate was 2.2% and the rental vacancy rate was 16.9%.

Racial composition as of the 2020 census
Race	Number	Percent
White	433	80.2%
Black or African American	2	0.4%
American Indian and Alaska Native	3	0.6%
Asian	1	0.2%
Native Hawaiian and Other Pacific Islander	0	0.0%
Some other race	59	10.9%
Two or more races	42	7.8%
Hispanic or Latino (of any race)	185	34.3%

=== 2000 census ===
As of the 2000 census, 739 people, 299 households, and 194 families were residing in the city. The population density was 938.1 inhabitants per square mile (362.2/km^{2}). The 354 housing units had an average density of 449.4 per square mile (173.5/km^{2}). The racial makeup of the city was 81.06% White, 0.27% African American, 0.54% Native American, 0.14% Asian, 0.54% Pacific Islander, 15.56% from other races, and 1.89% from two or more races. Hispanics or Latinos of any race were 24.36% of the population.

Of the 299 households, 33.4% had children under 18 living with them, 45.2% were married couples living together, 12.0% had a female householder with no husband present, and 35.1% were not families. About 33.4% of all households were made up of individuals, and 18.4% had someone living alone who was 65 or older. The average household size was 2.47 and the average family size was 3.14.

In the city, the age distribution was 30.0% under 18, 8.5% from 18 to 24, 27.3% from 25 to 44, 18.0% from 45 to 64, and 16.1% who were 65 or older. The median age was 36 years. For every 100 females, there were 97.6 males. For every 100 females 18 and over, there were 87.3 males.

The median income for a household in the city was $26,618 and for a family was $30,268. Males had a median income of $30,000 versus $17,232 for females. The per capita income for the city was $13,707. About 7.9% of families and 14.9% of the population were below the poverty line, including 12.3% of those under 18 and 17.8% of those 65 or over.

== Education ==
The City of Strawn is served by the Strawn Independent School District.

== Gallery ==
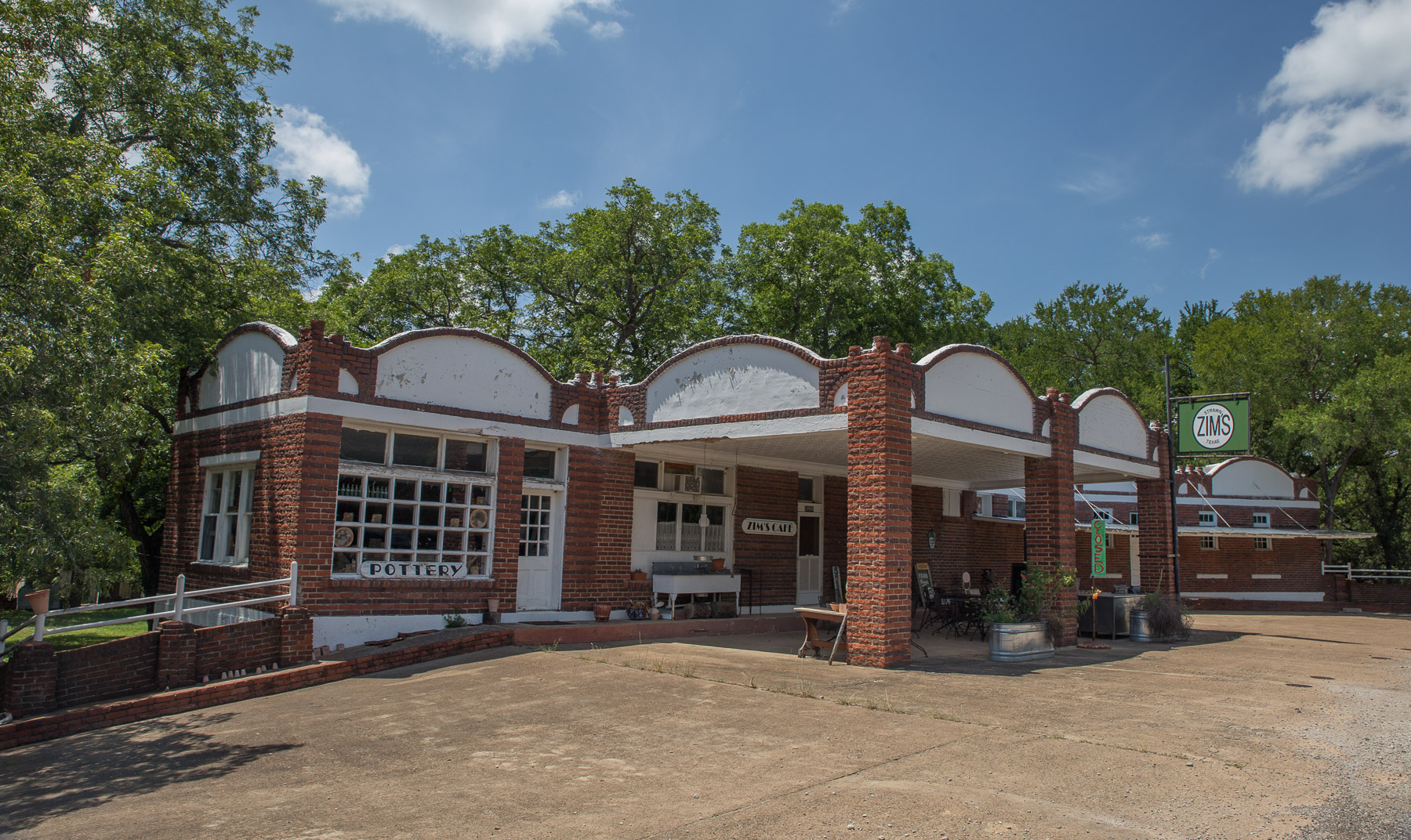
Zim's Cafe

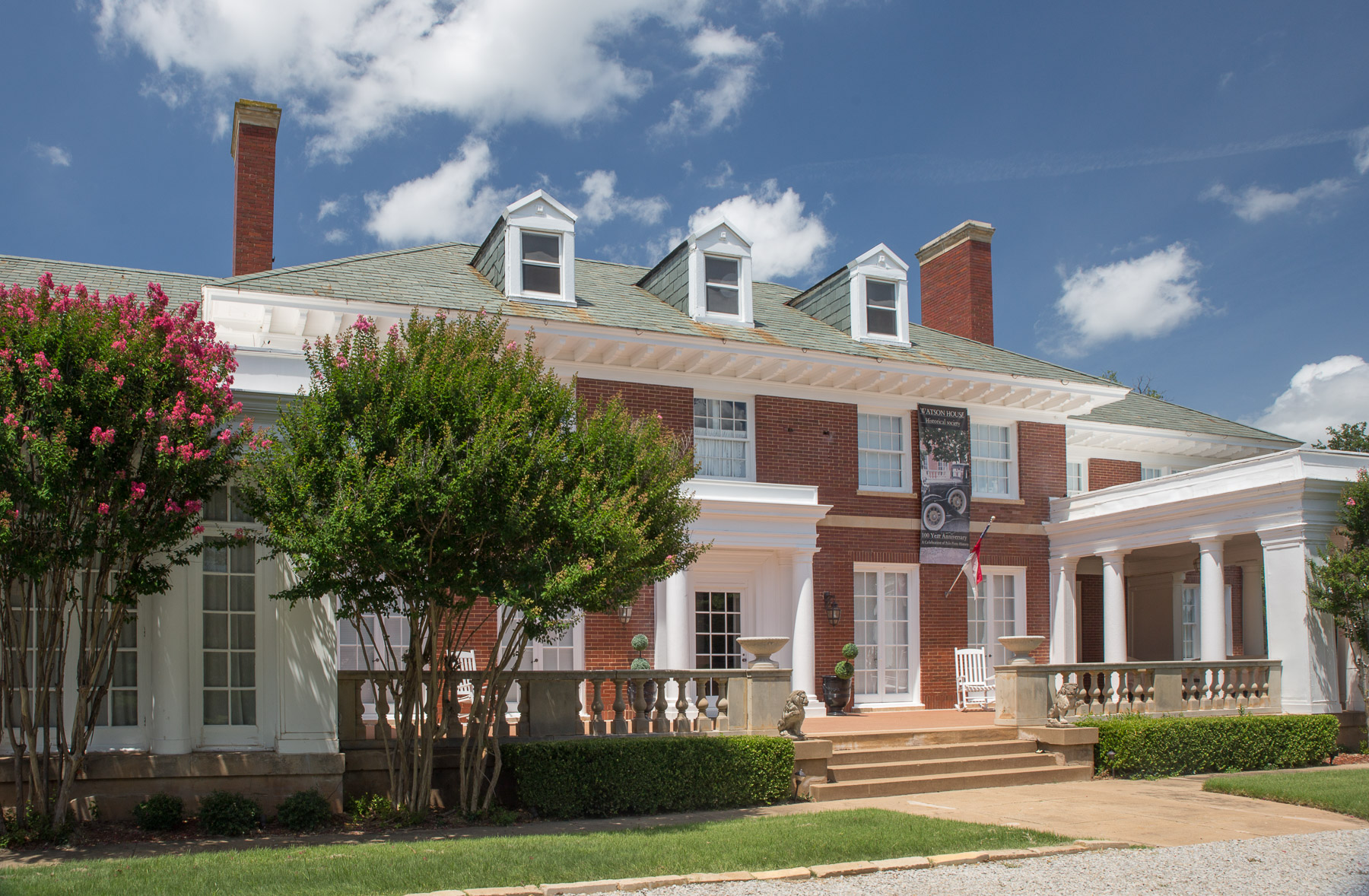
The Watson House

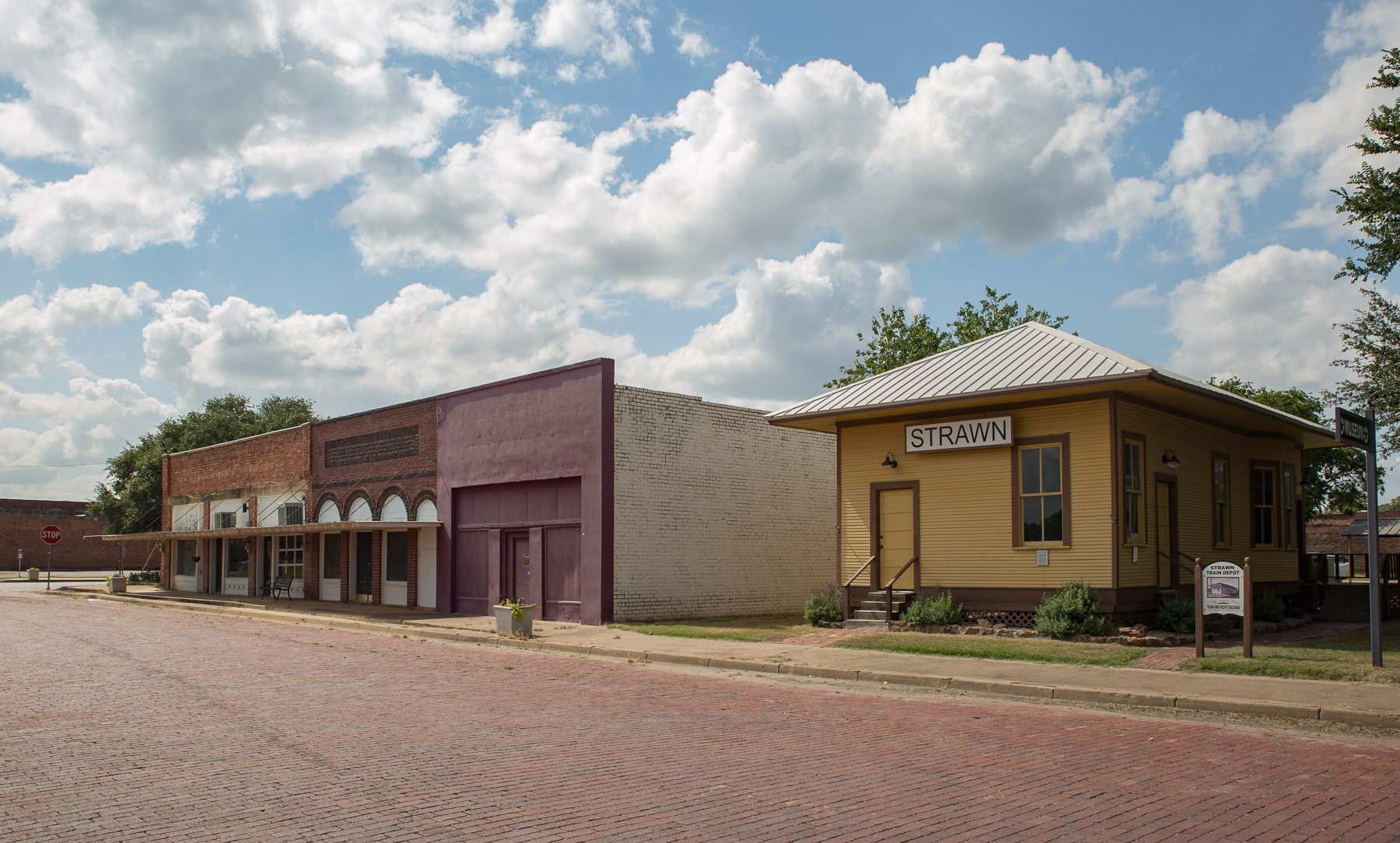
Downtown Strawn

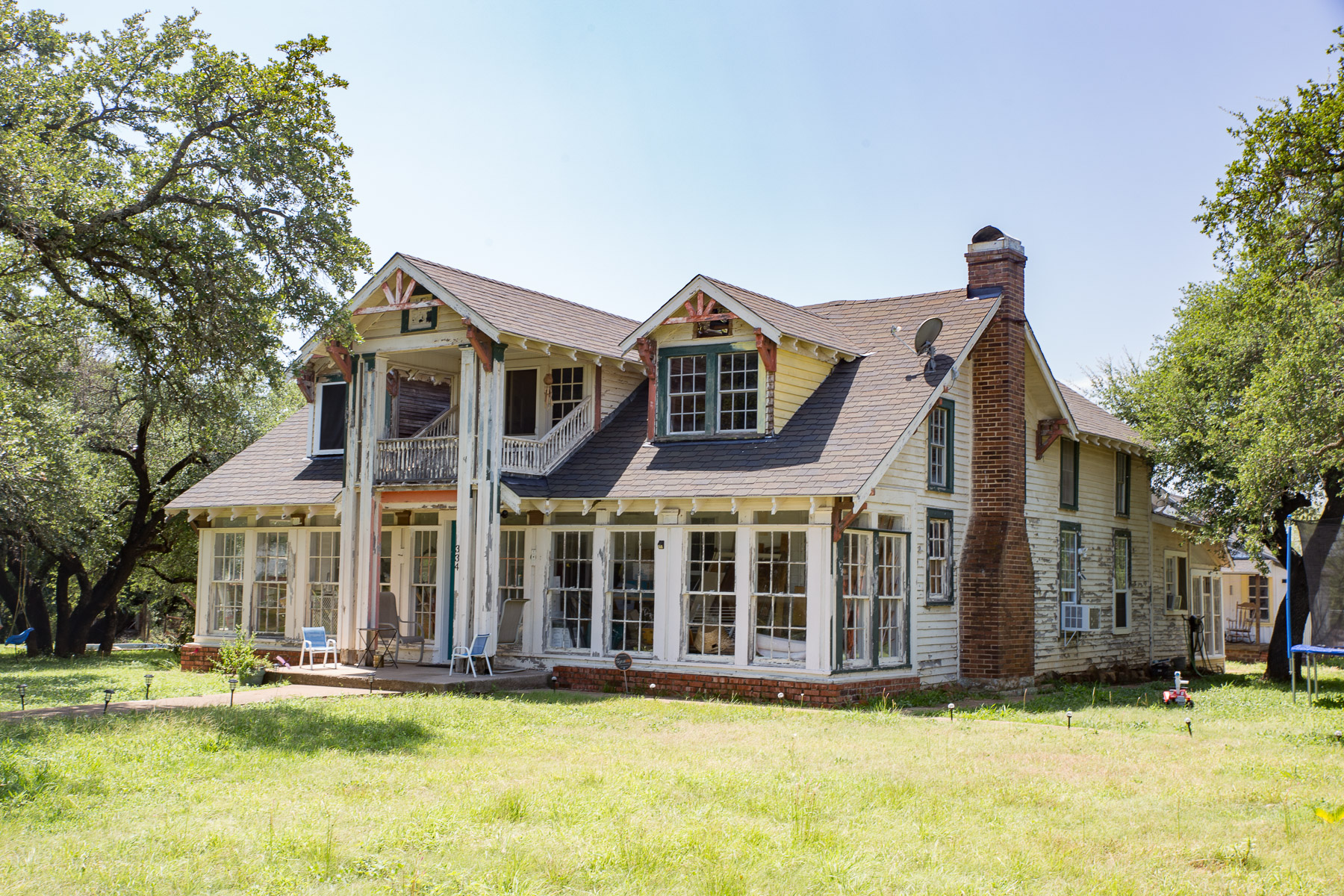
James Nesbit Stuart House

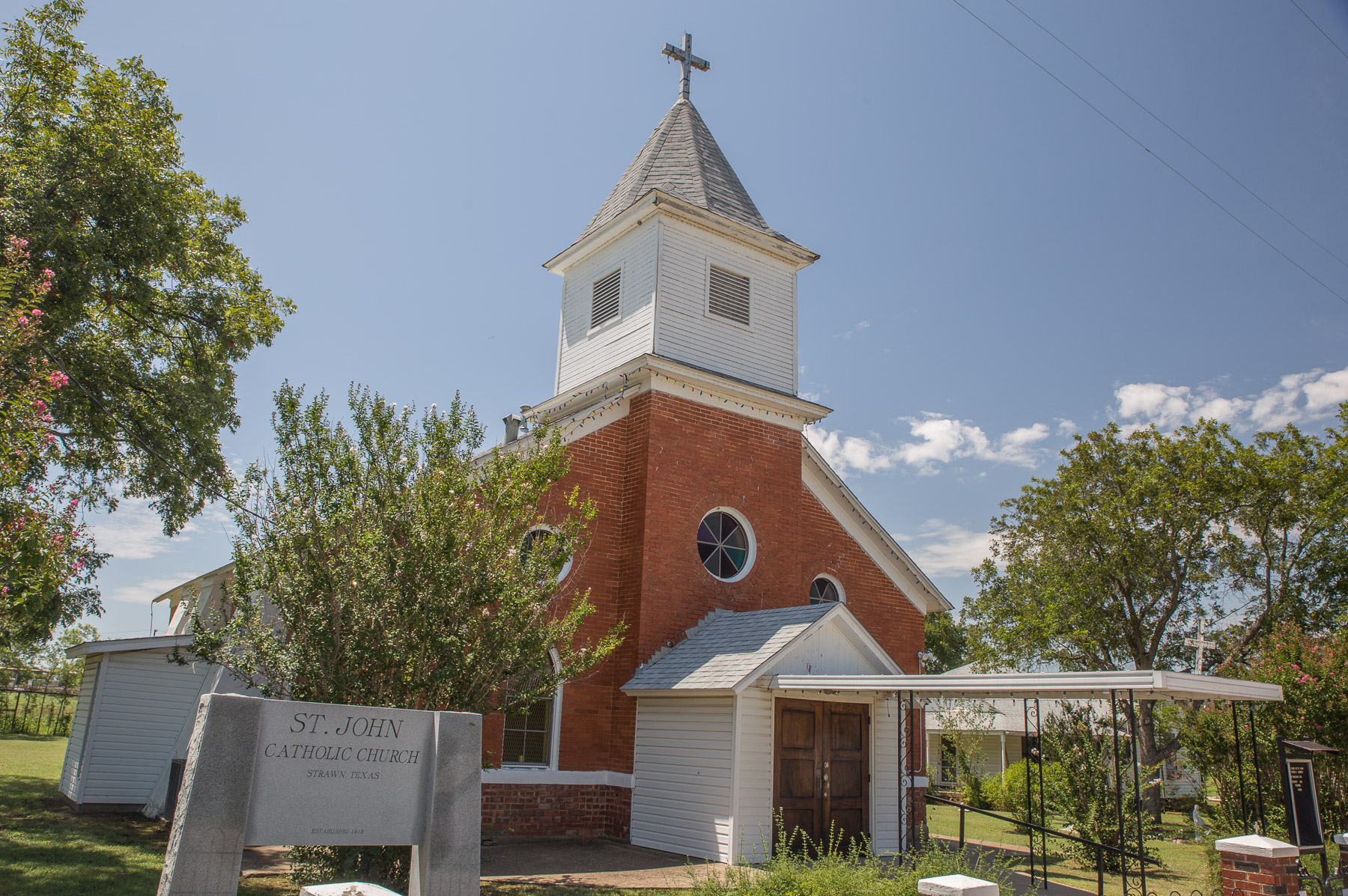
St. John's Catholic Church

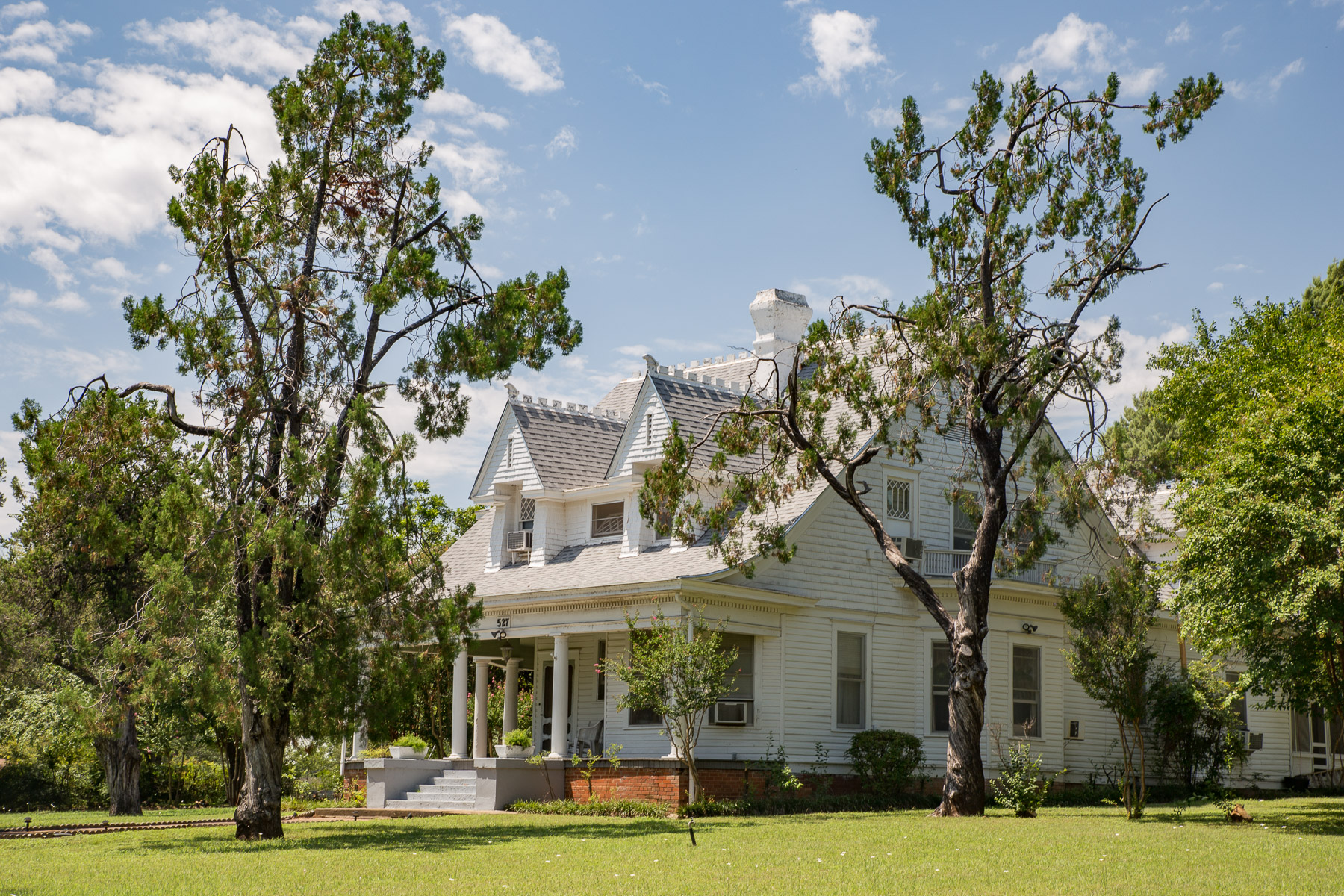
R.C. Hinkson House

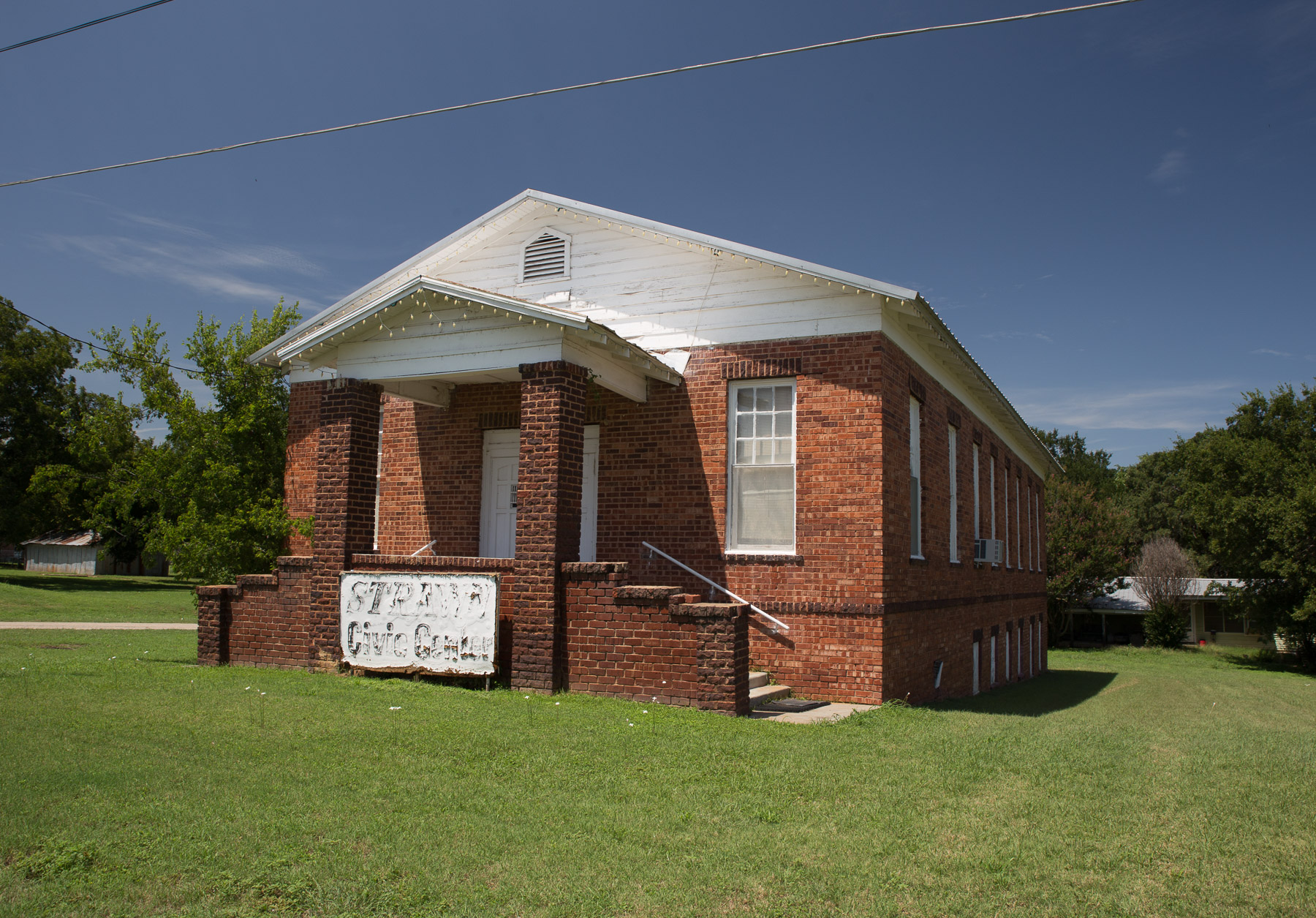
Strawn Civic Center

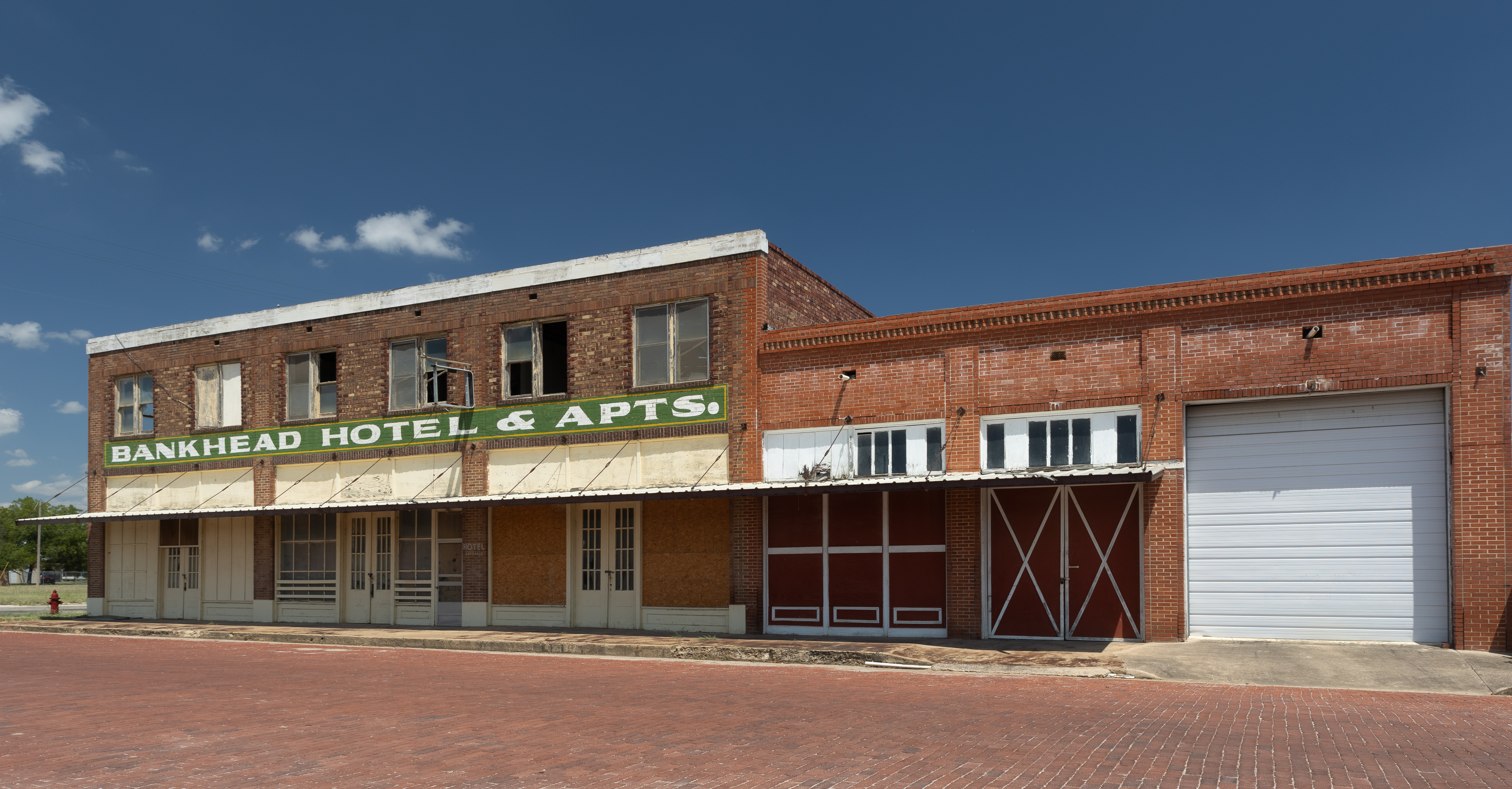
Bankhead Hotel

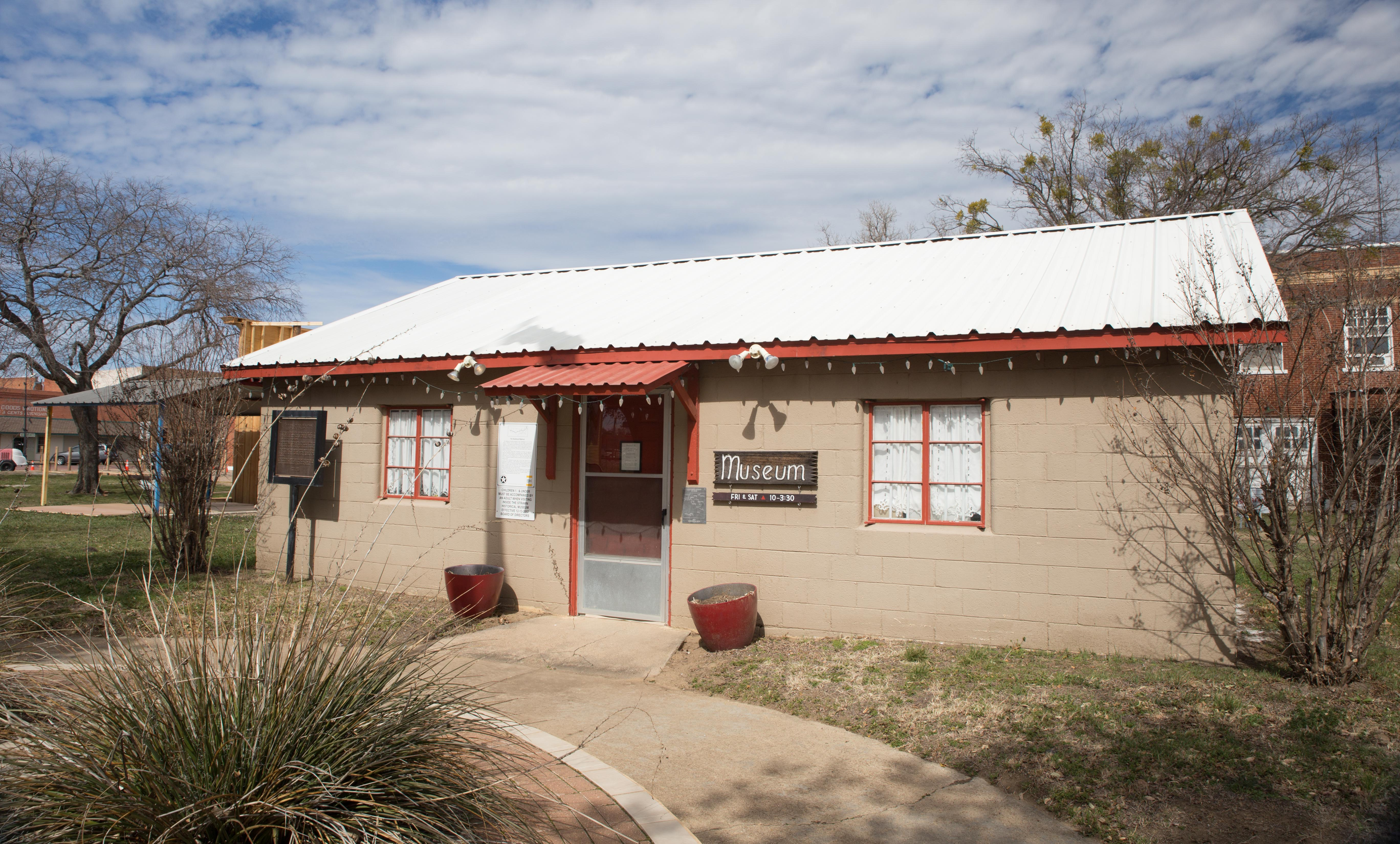
Strawn Historical Museum Association
