= Gordon, Texas =

- City
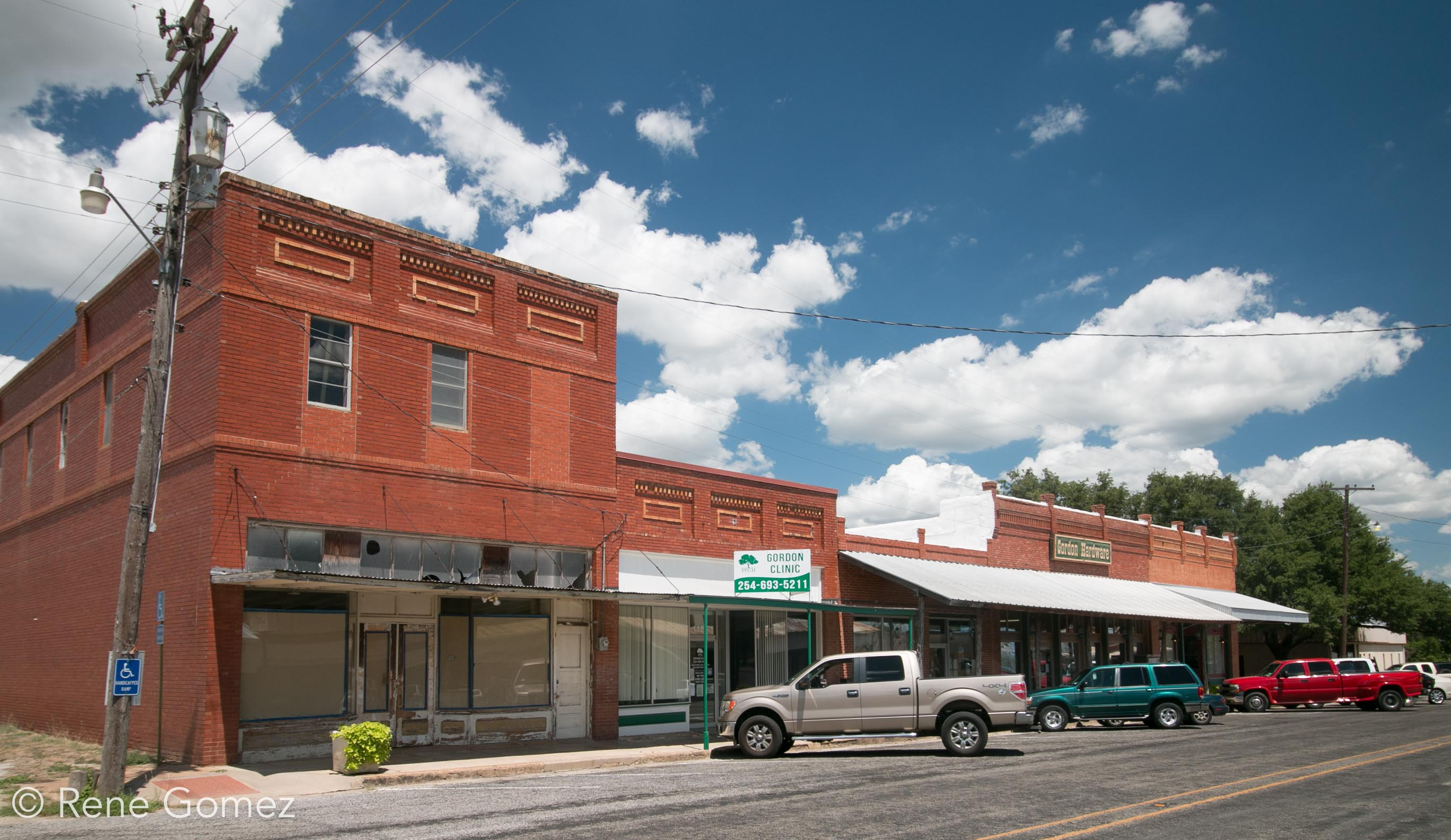
- Downtown Gordon.

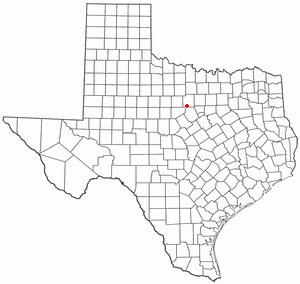
- Location of Gordon, Texas

- Coordinates: 32°32′52″N 98°22′18″W
- Country: United States
- State: Texas
- County: Palo Pinto
- Established: 1881

Area
  - Total: 0.97 sq mi (2.51 km^{2})
  - Land: 0.97 sq mi (2.51 km^{2})
  - Water: 0 sq mi (0.00 km^{2})
- Elevation: 984 ft (300 m)

Population (2020)
  - Total: 470
  - Density: 480/sq mi (190/km^{2})
- Time zone: UTC-6 (Central (CST))
  - Summer (DST): UTC-5 (CDT)
- ZIP code: 76453
- Area code: 254
- FIPS code: 48-30272
- GNIS feature ID: 2410623
- Website: City Website

Gordon is a city in Palo Pinto County, Texas, United States. The population was 470 at the 2020 Census.

== Geography ==
According to the United States Census Bureau, the city has a total area of 1.0 square mile (2.6 km^{2}), all land.

== History ==
Gordon's history begins in 1864 with the founding of the community of Hampton, Texas. The town of Gordon was planned by the Texas and Pacific Railway one mile south of Hampton in 1874. The new town was named Gordon after the civil engineer responsible for surveying the townsite land. The railroad was built through the area in 1880, and the following year Hampton was moved to meet the railroad. The first classes at the Gordon School were held in 1882, and the post office opened on October 17, 1883 with local businessman Robert Rogan serving as the community's first postmaster. Gordon High School was built in 1887, and by 1889 Gordon possessed five general stores, three drug stores, three hotels, three cotton gins, and a reported population of 300 residents.

By 1901, Gordon had telephone service and the city got its own power plant in 1912. In the U.S. Census of 1920, the burgeoning community reported 1,000 residents; but the effects of the Great Depression brought prosperity to a halt, and by 1960 fewer than 500 people were living in Gordon. The city has managed to survive as a point of commerce and shipping for local ranching and petroleum production. As of the 2000 Census, Gordon claimed 451 residents.

== Demographics ==
Historical population
Census	Pop.	Note	%±
1890	378		—
1910	609		—
1930	510		—
1940	532		4.3%
1950	404		−24.1%
1960	349		−13.6%
1970	457		30.9%
1980	516		12.9%
1990	465		−9.9%
2000	451		−3.0%
2010	478		6.0%
2020	470		−1.7%
U.S. Decennial Census; 2020 Census

=== 2020 census ===
As of the 2020 census, Gordon had a population of 470, and the median age was 42.5 years.

21.1% of residents were under the age of 18 and 25.5% of residents were 65 years of age or older.

For every 100 females there were 92.6 males, and for every 100 females age 18 and over there were 87.4 males age 18 and over.

0.0% of residents lived in urban areas, while 100.0% lived in rural areas.

There were 196 households in Gordon, of which 28.6% had children under the age of 18 living in them. Of all households, 54.6% were married-couple households, 14.8% were households with a male householder and no spouse or partner present, and 27.0% were households with a female householder and no spouse or partner present. About 28.0% of all households were made up of individuals and 15.8% had someone living alone who was 65 years of age or older.

There were 233 housing units, of which 15.9% were vacant. The homeowner vacancy rate was 4.7% and the rental vacancy rate was 8.9%.

Racial composition as of the 2020 census
Race	Number	Percent
White	402	85.5%
Black or African American	0	0.0%
American Indian and Alaska Native	6	1.3%
Asian	3	0.6%
Native Hawaiian and Other Pacific Islander	0	0.0%
Some other race	17	3.6%
Two or more races	42	8.9%
Hispanic or Latino (of any race)	37	7.9%

=== 2000 census ===
As of the 2000 census, there were 451 people, 190 households, and 128 families residing in the city. The population density was 467 inhabitants per square mile (180/km^{2}). There were 228 housing units at an average density of 236 per square mile (91/km^{2}). The racial makeup of the city was 96.23% White, 1.11% Native American, 0.44% Pacific Islander, 1.11% from other races, and 1.11% from two or more races. Hispanic or Latino of any race were 5.10% of the population.

There were 190 households, out of which 28.4% had children under the age of 18 living with them, 57.9% were married couples living together, 8.4% had a female householder with no husband present, and 32.6% were non-families. 30.5% of all households were made up of individuals, and 22.1% had someone living alone who was 65 years of age or older. The average household size was 2.37 and the average family size was 2.93.

In the city, the population was spread out, with 25.9% under the age of 18, 7.8% from 18 to 24, 22.2% from 25 to 44, 23.5% from 45 to 64, and 20.6% who were 65 years of age or older. The median age was 41 years. For every 100 females, there were 79.7 males. For every 100 females age 18 and over, there were 80.5 males.

The median income for a household in the city was $33,056, and the median income for a family was $41,750. Males had a median income of $40,156 versus $20,781 for females. The per capita income for the city was $18,307. About 8.1% of families and 13.2% of the population were below the poverty line, including 21.4% of those under age 18 and 15.3% of those age 65 or over.

== Education ==
The City of Gordon is served by the Gordon Independent School District.

== Notable people ==
- Pat Caraway, Major League Baseball player
- Bob Richards, Former Olympic athlete and conservative political figure
- Thurman Tucker, Major League Baseball player
