= Mingus, Texas =

- City
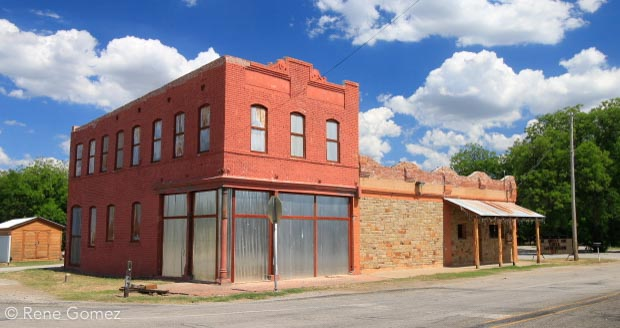

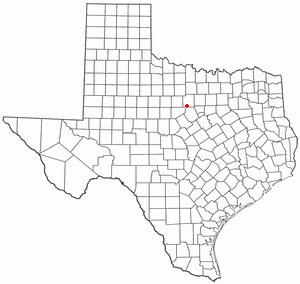
- Location of Mingus, Texas

- Coordinates: 32°32′11″N 98°25′30″W
- Country: United States
- State: Texas
- County: Palo Pinto

Area
  - Total: 1.55 sq mi (4.01 km^{2})
  - Land: 1.55 sq mi (4.01 km^{2})
  - Water: 0 sq mi (0.00 km^{2})
- Elevation: 974 ft (297 m)

Population (2020)
  - Total: 223
  - Estimate (2023): 223
  - Density: 165.8/sq mi (64.02/km^{2})
- Time zone: UTC-6 (Central (CST))
  - Summer (DST): UTC-5 (CDT)
- ZIP code: 76463
- Area code: 254
- FIPS code: 48-48720
- GNIS feature ID: 2411120
- Website: mingus.us

Mingus is a city in Palo Pinto County, Texas, United States. The population was 223 at the 2020 census.

== History ==
In the 1960s, 1970s, and 1980s, Mingus, known as a "wet" town, had a thriving set of liquor stores and bars patronized by those in "dry" areas in Palo Pinto County and other area counties. This era in Mingus history was memorialized in a comedic country song by John Clay and the Lost Austin Band called "Road to Mingus." The lyrics tell of the deaths of three young men from Strawn, Texas, who travel to Mingus for beer, and, coming home in their '39 Ford, try to beat the Katy at a crossing and die when they are struck by the "reckless railroad train."

Area residents blamed aggressive law enforcement for the demise of the stores and bars. By the 2000s, the Cossacks Motorcycle Club patronized the remaining commercial establishments in the town.

== Geography ==
According to the United States Census Bureau, the city has a total area of 1.5 square miles (3.9 km^{2}), all land.

=== Climate ===
The climate in this area is characterized by hot, humid summers and generally mild to cool winters. According to the Köppen Climate Classification system, Mingus has a humid subtropical climate, abbreviated "Cfa" on climate maps.

== Demographics ==
Historical population
Census	Pop.	Note	%±
1940	570		—
1950	310		−45.6%
1960	253		−18.4%
1970	273		7.9%
1980	212		−22.3%
1990	215		1.4%
2000	246		14.4%
2010	235		−4.5%
2020	223		−5.1%
U.S. Decennial Census; 2020 Census

=== 2020 census ===
As of the 2020 census, Mingus had a population of 223. The median age was 46.2 years. 20.2% of residents were under the age of 18 and 19.3% of residents were 65 years of age or older. For every 100 females there were 104.6 males, and for every 100 females age 18 and over there were 102.3 males age 18 and over.

0.0% of residents lived in urban areas, while 100.0% lived in rural areas.

There were 100 households in Mingus, of which 25.0% had children under the age of 18 living in them. Of all households, 33.0% were married-couple households, 30.0% were households with a male householder and no spouse or partner present, and 30.0% were households with a female householder and no spouse or partner present. About 29.0% of all households were made up of individuals and 18.0% had someone living alone who was 65 years of age or older.

There were 135 housing units, of which 25.9% were vacant. The homeowner vacancy rate was 9.5% and the rental vacancy rate was 14.7%.

Racial composition as of the 2020 census
Race	Number	Percent
White	199	89.2%
Black or African American	1	0.4%
American Indian and Alaska Native	0	0.0%
Asian	0	0.0%
Native Hawaiian and Other Pacific Islander	0	0.0%
Some other race	6	2.7%
Two or more races	17	7.6%
Hispanic or Latino (of any race)	22	9.9%

=== 2000 census ===
As of the 2000 census there were 246 people, 110 households, and 59 families residing in the city. The population density was 158.3 inhabitants per square mile (61.1/km^{2}). There were 136 housing units at an average density of 87.5 per square mile (33.8/km^{2}). The racial makeup of the city was 89.84% White, 0.41% Native American, 0.41% Asian, 8.54% from other races, and 0.81% from two or more races. Hispanic or Latino of any race were 10.57% of the population.

There were 110 households, out of which 25.5% had children under the age of 18 living with them, 39.1% were married couples living together, 11.8% had a female householder with no husband present, and 45.5% were non-families. 41.8% of all households were made up of individuals, and 16.4% had someone living alone who was 65 years of age or older. The average household size was 2.24 and the average family size was 3.18.

In the city, the population was spread out, with 23.6% under the age of 18, 10.2% from 18 to 24, 18.7% from 25 to 44, 27.6% from 45 to 64, and 19.9% who were 65 years of age or older. The median age was 43 years. For every 100 females, there were 89.2 males. For every 100 females age 18 and over, there were 82.5 males.

The median income for a household in the city was $28,750, and the median income for a family was $40,208. Males had a median income of $30,417 versus $25,625 for females. The per capita income for the city was $22,591. About 7.5% of families and 11.7% of the population were below the poverty line, including none of those under the age of eighteen and 19.6% of those 65 or over.

== Education ==
The City of Mingus is served by the Gordon Independent School District.
