= Palo Pinto, Texas =

Palo Pinto
- CDP
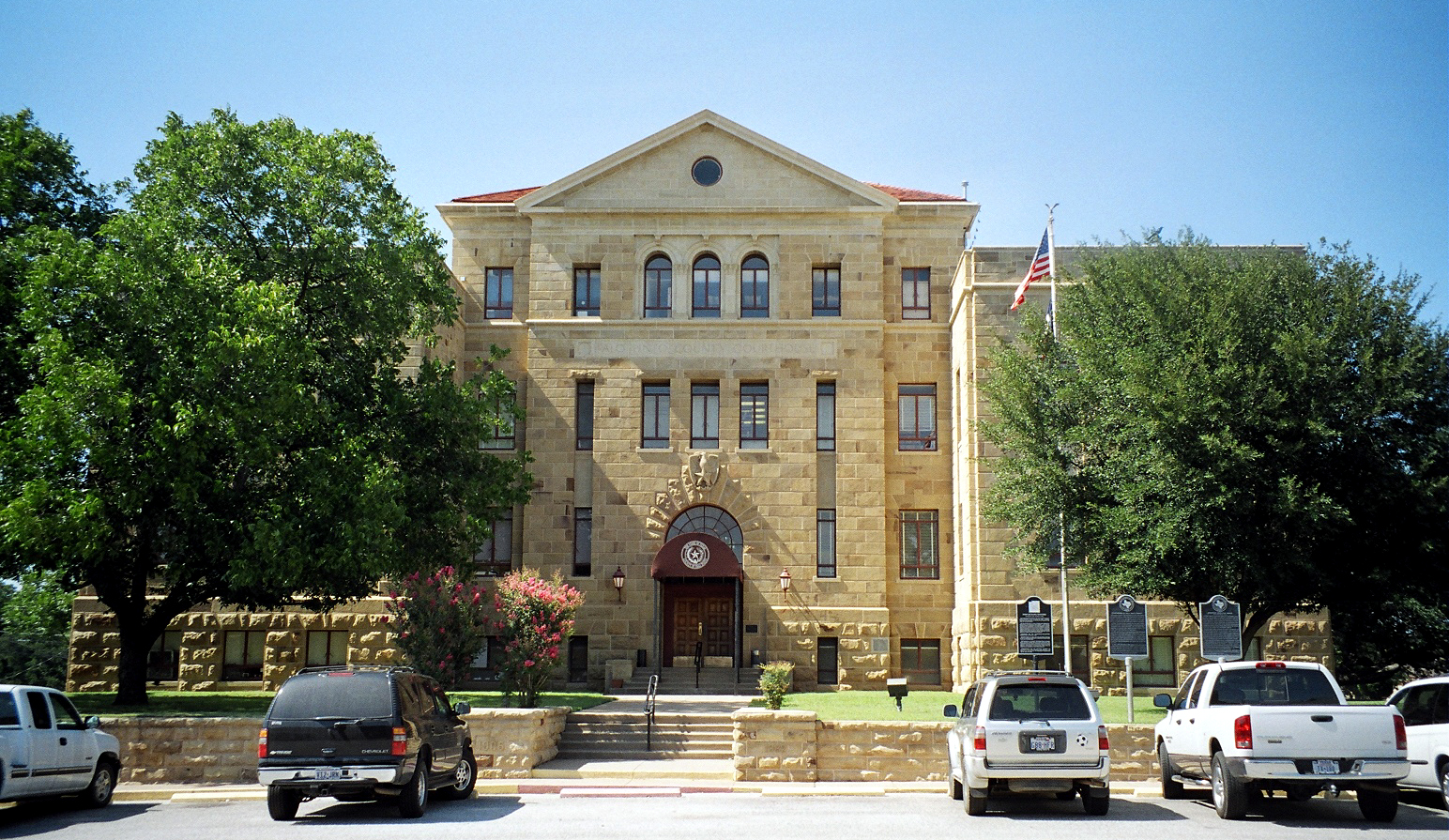
- Palo Pinto County Courthouse

- Location within the state of Texas Palo Pinto (the United States)
- Coordinates: 32°46′09″N 98°18′03″W
- Country: United States
- State: Texas
- County: Palo Pinto

Area
  - Total: 0.89 sq mi (2.3 km^{2})
  - Land: 0.89 sq mi (2.3 km^{2})
  - Water: 0 sq mi (0.0 km^{2})
- Elevation: 1,024 ft (312 m)

Population (2010)
  - Total: 333
  - Density: 370/sq mi (140/km^{2})
- Time zone: UTC-6 (Central (CST))
  - Summer (DST): UTC-5 (CDT)
- ZIP codes: 76484
- Area code: 940
- GNIS feature ID: 2584712

Palo Pinto is a census-designated place (CDP) and unincorporated community in and the county seat of Palo Pinto County, Texas, United States. As of the 2020 census, Palo Pinto had a population of 276.

== Geography ==
Palo Pinto has a total area of 0.9 square miles (2.3 km^{2}), all land.

=== Climate ===
The climate in this area is characterized by relatively high temperatures and evenly distributed precipitation throughout the year. The Köppen climate classification system describes the weather as humid subtropical, Cfa.

== History ==
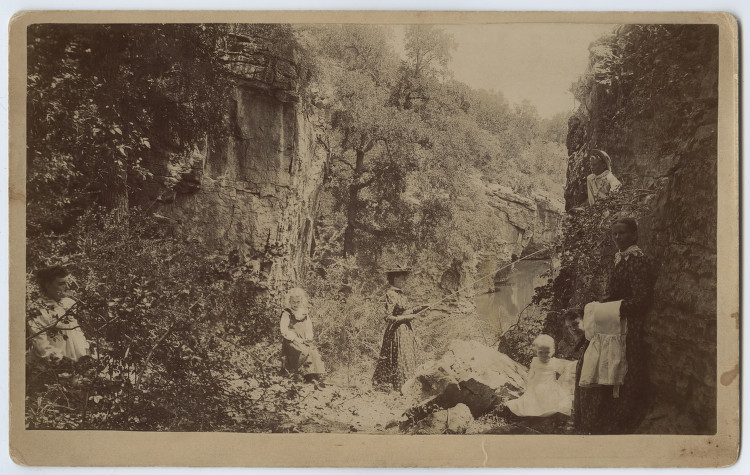
Picnic in "Lovers Retreat", 1892

When legislation calling for organization of Palo Pinto County was passed in 1856, a community was designated to be built within five miles of the center of the county to serve as the seat of government. The county was formally organized in May 1857, and on August 18 of the same year, the first session of the county court was held, during which the plans for the new county seat were discussed and enacted. The community, then called Golconda, was laid out soon thereafter, and received its post office in March 1858. Around this time, the town (and, soon after, post office) were renamed Palo Pinto.

The first Palo Pinto County Courthouse was built in 1857, and a two-story stone jail was built soon after. By 1860, Palo Pinto had a hotel, a law firm, several saloons, and its own school. The Civil War, however, had a dire effect on commerce in the community, forcing several businesses to close. Over the next decade or so, it evolved into a shipping point for the local ranching industry. The county's first newspaper opened in 1876, and throughout the 1870s, the town remained the center of government and commerce, and the only town and principal settlement in Palo Pinto County.

In 1880, Palo Pinto was bypassed by the Texas and Pacific Railway. Although it suffered, the population remained above 400 and it retained several businesses. The county seat has remained in Palo Pinto, though it was surpassed as the largest town in the county by Mineral Wells many years ago. The current Palo Pinto County Courthouse, located on US 180 at the center of town, was built in 1940. The population reached a high mark of 550 in 1947 before declining to around 400, a mark it has maintained fairly consistently ever since.

== Demographics ==
Historical population
Census	Pop.	Note	%±
2010	333		—
2020	276		−17.1%
U.S. Decennial Census; 1850–1900 1910; 1920 1930 1940; 1950 1960 1970; 1980 1990 2000; 2010 2020

Palo Pinto first appeared as a census designated place in the 2010 U.S. census.

Palo Pinto CDP, Texas – Racial and ethnic composition Note: the US Census treats Hispanic/Latino as an ethnic category. This table excludes Latinos from the racial categories and assigns them to a separate category. Hispanics/Latinos may be of any race.
Race / Ethnicity (NH = Non-Hispanic)	Pop 2010	Pop 2020	% 2010	% 2020
White alone (NH)	271	207	81.38%	75.00%
Black or African American alone (NH)	12	6	3.60%	2.17%
Native American or Alaska Native alone (NH)	0	2	0.00%	0.72%
Asian alone (NH)	0	5	0.00%	1.81%
Native Hawaiian or Pacific Islander alone (NH)	0	1	0.00%	0.36%
Other race alone (NH)	0	1	0.00%	0.36%
Mixed race or Multiracial (NH)	4	7	1.20%	2.54%
Hispanic or Latino (any race)	46	47	13.81%	17.03%
Total	333	276	100.00%	100.00%

As of the 2020 United States census, there were 276 people, 41 households, and 37 families residing in the CDP.

== Education ==
Palo Pinto is served by three school districts; children in prekindergarten through sixth grade attend the Palo Pinto ISD school, and seventh through 12th grade attend Gordon ISD or Mineral Wells ISD schools.
