= Palo Pinto County, Texas =

County in Texas, United States

- County
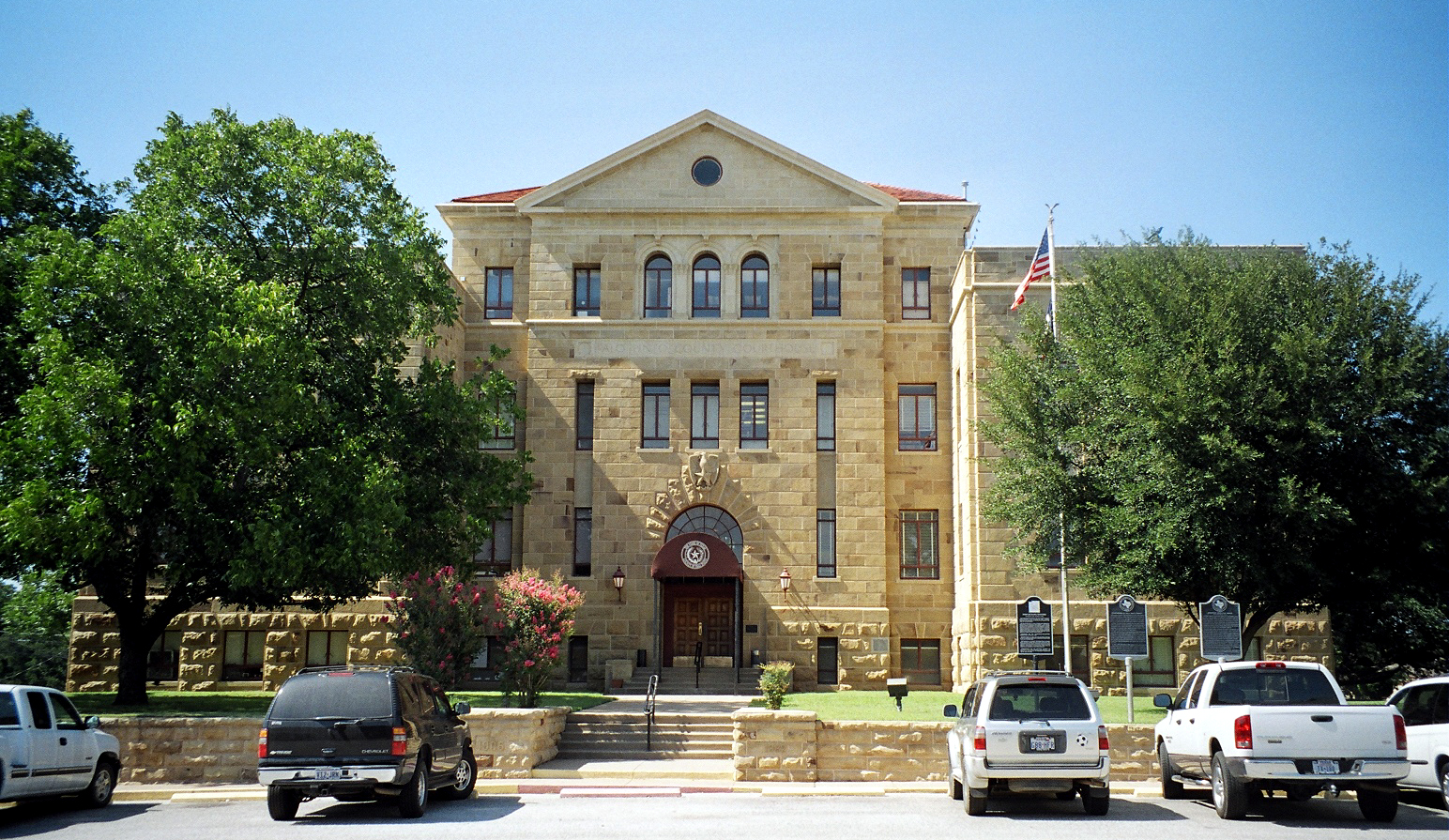
- The Palo Pinto County Courthouse in Palo Pinto: The limestone structure was added to the National Register of Historic Places in 1997.

- Flag

- Location within the U.S. state of Texas
- Coordinates: 32°45′11″N 98°18′47″W
- Country: United States
- State: Texas
- Founded: 1857
- Named for: Palo Pinto Creek
- Seat: Palo Pinto
- Largest city: Mineral Wells

Area
  - Total: 986 sq mi (2,550 km^{2})
  - Land: 952 sq mi (2,470 km^{2})
  - Water: 34 sq mi (88 km^{2}) 3.4%

Population (2020)
  - Total: 28,409
  - Estimate (2025): 30,791 ▲
  - Density: 29.8/sq mi (11.5/km^{2})
- Time zone: UTC−6 (Central)
  - Summer (DST): UTC−5 (CDT)
- Congressional district: 25th
- Website: www.co.palo-pinto.tx.us

Palo Pinto County is a county located in the U.S. state of Texas. As of the 2020 census, its population was 28,409. The county seat is Palo Pinto. The county was created in 1856 and organized the following year.

Palo Pinto County comprises the Mineral Wells micropolitan statistical area, which is part of the Dallas–Fort Worth combined statistical area. It is located in the western Cross Timbers ecoregion.

== History ==
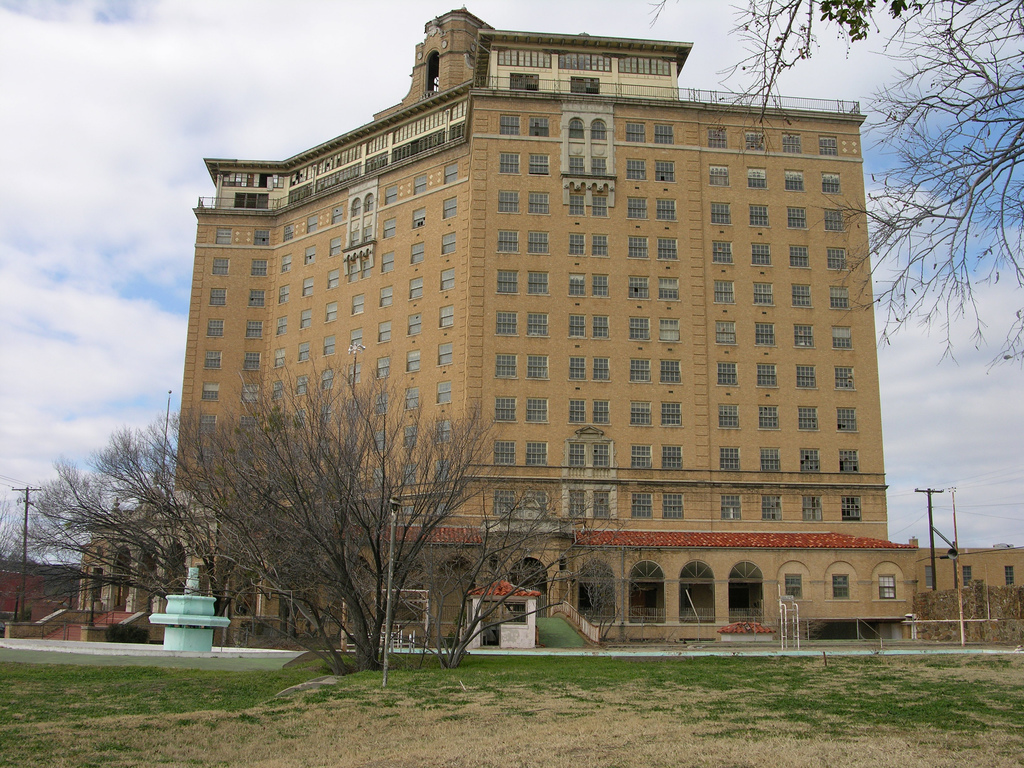
The abandoned Baker Hotel in Mineral Wells

=== Native Americans ===
The Brazos Indian Reservation, founded by General Randolph B. Marcy in 1854, provided a safety area from warring Comanche for Delaware, Shawnee, Tonkawa, Wichita, Choctaw, and Caddo. Within the reservation, each tribe had its own village and cultivated agricultural crops. Government-contracted beef cattle were delivered each week. Citizens were unable to distinguish between reservation and nonreservation tribes, blaming Comanche and Kiowa depredations on the reservation Indians. A newspaper in Jacksboro, Texas, titled The White Man advocated removal of all tribes from North Texas.

During December 1858, Choctaw Tom, who was a Yowani married to a Hasinai woman, who was at times an interpreter to Sam Houston, and a group of reservation Indians received permission for an off-the-reservation hunt. On December 27, Captain Peter Garland and a vigilante group charged Choctaw Tom's camp, indiscriminately murdering and injuring women and children along with the men.

Governor Hardin Richard Runnels ordered John Henry Brown to the area with 100 troops. An examining trial was conducted about the Choctaw Tom raid, but no indictments resulted.

In May 1859, John Baylor and a number of whites confronted United States troops at the reservation, demanding the surrender of certain tribal individuals. The military balked, and Baylor retreated, but in so doing killed an Indian woman and an old man. Baylor's group was later attacked by Indians off the reservation, where the military had no authority to intervene. At the behest of terrified settlers, the reservation was abandoned that year.

=== County established ===
In 1856, the Texas State Legislature established Palo Pinto County from Bosque and Navarro Counties and named it for Palo Pinto Creek. The county was organized the next year, with the town of Golconda chosen to be the seat of government. The town was renamed Palo Pinto in 1858.

=== Early ranching and farming years ===
Ranching entrepreneurs Oliver Loving and Charles Goodnight, who blazed the Goodnight-Loving Trail, along with Reuben Vaughan, were the nucleus of the original settlers. An 1876 area rancher meeting regarding cattle rustling became the beginnings of what is now known as the Texas and Southwestern Cattle Raisers Association.

The Fence Cutting Wars in Texas lasted about 5 years, 1883–1888. As farmers and ranchers began to compete for precious land and water, cattlemen found feeding their herds more difficult, prompting cowboys to cut through fences. Texas Governor John Ireland prodded a special assembly to order the fence cutters to cease. In response, the legislature made fence-cutting and pasture-burning crimes punishable with prison time, while at the same time regulating fencing. The practice abated with sporadic incidents of related violence in 1888.

=== Later growth years ===
James and Amanda Lynch first moved to the area in 1877. In digging a well on their property, they discovered the water seemed to benefit their well-being. Word spread about the water's healing powers, and people from all over came to experience the benefits. Eventually, the town of Mineral Wells was platted.

Mineral Wells State Park and Trailway, a short distance to east of the town of Mineral Wells in Palo Pinto County, was opened to the public in 1981; it lies in Parker County.

The Texas National Guard organized the 56th Cavalry Brigade in 1921, and four years later, Brigadier General Jacob F. Wolters was given a grant to construct a training camp for the unit. In 1941, Camp Wolters was turned over to the United States Army. It was redesignated Wolters Air Force Base in 1951. Five years later, the base reverted to the Army as a helicopter training school. The base closed in 1973 when the helicopter school transferred to Fort Rucker in Alabama.

Possum Kingdom Lake was acquired from the Brazos River Authority in 1940. The Civilian Conservation Corps constructed the facilities, and the Possum Kingdom State Park opened to the public in 1950.

== Geography ==
According to the U.S. Census Bureau, the county has a total area of 986 sq mi (2,550 km^{2}), of which 34 sq mi (88 km^{2}) (3.4%) are covered by water.

=== Features ===
- Palo Pinto Mountains
- Brazos River
- Possum Kingdom Lake

=== Major highways ===
- Interstate 20
- U.S. Highway 180
- U.S. Highway 281
- State Highway 16
- State Highway 108
- State Highway 193
- State Highway 254
- State Highway 337
- Spur 397
- Loop 533

=== Adjacent counties ===
- Jack County (north)
- Parker County (east)
- Hood County (southeast)
- Erath County (south)
- Eastland County (southwest)
- Stephens County (west)
- Young County (northwest)

== Demographics ==
Historical population
Census	Pop.	Note	%±
1860	1,524		—
1880	5,885		—
1890	8,320		41.4%
1900	12,291		47.7%
1910	19,506		58.7%
1920	23,431		20.1%
1930	17,576		−25.0%
1940	18,456		5.0%
1950	17,154		−7.1%
1960	20,516		19.6%
1970	28,962		41.2%
1980	24,062		−16.9%
1990	25,055		4.1%
2000	27,026		7.9%
2010	28,111		4.0%
2020	28,409		1.1%
2025 (est.)	30,791	▲	8.4%
U.S. Decennial Census; 1850–2010 2010 2020

=== Racial and ethnic composition ===
Palo Pinto County, Texas – Racial and ethnic composition Note: the US Census treats Hispanic/Latino as an ethnic category. This table excludes Latinos from the racial categories and assigns them to a separate category. Hispanics/Latinos may be of any race.
Race / Ethnicity (NH = Non-Hispanic)	Pop 1980	Pop 1990	Pop 2000	Pop 2010	Pop 2020	% 1980	% 1990	% 2000	% 2010	% 2020
White alone (NH)	21,601	21,707	22,163	21,958	20,778	89.77%	86.64%	82.01%	78.11%	73.14%
Black or African American alone (NH)	811	783	617	597	552	3.37%	3.13%	2.28%	2.12%	1.94%
Native American or Alaska Native alone (NH)	67	79	140	135	149	0.28%	0.32%	0.52%	0.48%	0.52%
Asian alone (NH)	110	170	137	132	211	0.46%	0.68%	0.51%	0.47%	0.74%
Native Hawaiian or Pacific Islander alone (NH)	x	x	4	11	12	x	x	0.01%	0.04%	0.04%
Other race alone (NH)	110	15	17	13	69	0.46%	0.06%	0.06%	0.05%	0.24%
Mixed race or Multiracial (NH)	x	x	281	280	1,024	x	x	1.04%	1.00%	3.60%
Hispanic or Latino (any race)	1,363	2,301	3,667	4,985	5,614	5.66%	9.18%	13.57%	17.73%	19.76%
Total	24,062	25,055	27,026	28,111	28,409	100.00%	100.00%	100.00%	100.00%	100.00%

=== 2020 census ===
As of the 2020 census, the county had a population of 28,409. The median age was 42.5 years. 22.4% of residents were under the age of 18 and 20.7% of residents were 65 years of age or older. For every 100 females there were 97.0 males, and for every 100 females age 18 and over there were 94.5 males age 18 and over.

The racial makeup of the county was 79.6% White, 2.0% Black or African American, 0.9% American Indian and Alaska Native, 0.8% Asian, <0.1% Native Hawaiian and Pacific Islander, 7.6% from some other race, and 9.0% from two or more races. Hispanic or Latino residents of any race comprised 19.8% of the population.

49.6% of residents lived in urban areas, while 50.4% lived in rural areas.

There were 11,250 households in the county, of which 29.4% had children under the age of 18 living in them. Of all households, 49.2% were married-couple households, 18.0% were households with a male householder and no spouse or partner present, and 25.9% were households with a female householder and no spouse or partner present. About 26.7% of all households were made up of individuals and 13.6% had someone living alone who was 65 years of age or older.

There were 15,079 housing units, of which 25.4% were vacant. Among occupied housing units, 69.0% were owner-occupied and 31.0% were renter-occupied. The homeowner vacancy rate was 2.3% and the rental vacancy rate was 8.5%.

=== 2010 census ===
As of the 2010 census, 2.0 same-sex couples per 1,000 households were in the county.

=== 2000 census ===
As of the census of 2000, 27,026 people, 10,594 households, and 7,447 families were residing in the county. The population density was 28 people/mi^{2} (11 people/km^{2}). The 14,102 housing units averaged 15 per square mile (5.8/km^{2}). The racial makeup of the county was 88.19% White, 2.32% African American, 0.67% Native American, 0.53% Asian, 6.59% from other races, and 1.71% from two or more races. About 13.57% of the population were Hispanics or Latinos of any race.

Of the 10,594 households, 30.40% had children under 18 living with them, 55.60% were married couples living together, 10.40% had a female householder with no husband present, and 29.70% were not families. About 26.20% of all households were made up of individuals, and 12.90% had someone living alone who was 65 or older. The average household size was 2.52, and the average family size was 3.02.

In the county, the age distribution was 26.0% under 18, 8.2% from 18 to 24, 25.9% from 25 to 44, 23.6% from 45 to 64, and 16.4% who were 65 or older. The median age was 38 years. For every 100 females, there were 96.70 males. For every 100 females age 18 and over, there were 92.30 males.

The median income for a household was $31,203, and for a family was $36,977. Males had a median income of $28,526 versus $18,834 for females. The per capita income for the county was $15,454. About 12.30% of families and 15.90% of the population were below the poverty line, including 20.50% of those under age 18 and 11.80% of those age 65 or over.

== Communities ==
=== Cities ===
- Gordon
- Graford
- Mineral Wells (partly in Parker County)
- Mingus
- Strawn

=== Census-designated places ===
- Brazos
- Palo Pinto (county seat)
- Santo

=== Other unincorporated community ===
- Oran

== Notable people ==
- Steve Tyrell, singer and recording artist
- Glenn Rogers, Republican member of the Texas House of Representatives from District 60 (2021–present)

== Politics ==
Palo Pinto County is located within District 60 of the Texas House of Representatives. Palo Pinto County is located within District 10 of the Texas Senate.

United States presidential election results for Palo Pinto County, Texas
Year	Republican		Democratic		Third party(ies)	
Year	No.	%	No.	%	No.	%
1912	68	3.83%	1,231	69.27%	478	26.90%
1916	124	6.71%	1,431	77.44%	293	15.85%
1920	342	15.75%	1,645	75.74%	185	8.52%
1924	473	17.98%	1,926	73.20%	232	8.82%
1928	2,001	63.28%	1,161	36.72%	0	0.00%
1932	392	12.53%	2,722	87.02%	14	0.45%
1936	371	11.88%	2,738	87.67%	14	0.45%
1940	510	16.50%	2,571	83.20%	9	0.29%
1944	416	10.08%	3,291	79.76%	419	10.16%
1948	977	19.37%	3,736	74.05%	332	6.58%
1952	3,029	51.19%	2,876	48.61%	12	0.20%
1956	2,818	54.20%	2,369	45.57%	12	0.23%
1960	2,695	46.93%	3,022	52.63%	25	0.44%
1964	1,748	31.55%	3,791	68.42%	2	0.04%
1968	2,627	35.33%	3,552	47.77%	1,257	16.90%
1972	5,058	69.79%	2,181	30.10%	8	0.11%
1976	2,684	33.95%	5,170	65.40%	51	0.65%
1980	4,068	47.95%	4,244	50.02%	172	2.03%
1984	5,701	62.81%	3,349	36.90%	27	0.30%
1988	4,649	53.85%	3,930	45.52%	55	0.64%
1992	2,852	30.75%	3,392	36.57%	3,031	32.68%
1996	3,666	42.36%	3,938	45.50%	1,051	12.14%
2000	5,690	62.40%	3,263	35.79%	165	1.81%
2004	7,137	71.27%	2,816	28.12%	61	0.61%
2008	7,264	73.45%	2,499	25.27%	127	1.28%
2012	7,393	79.06%	1,811	19.37%	147	1.57%
2016	8,284	80.66%	1,708	16.63%	278	2.71%
2020	10,179	81.50%	2,178	17.44%	132	1.06%
2024	11,093	83.18%	2,143	16.07%	100	0.75%

United States Senate election results for Palo Pinto County, Texas1
Year	Republican		Democratic		Third party(ies)	
Year	No.	%	No.	%	No.	%
2024	10,611	80.13%	2,355	17.78%	277	2.09%

United States Senate election results for Palo Pinto County, Texas2
Year	Republican		Democratic		Third party(ies)	
Year	No.	%	No.	%	No.	%
2020	9,999	81.11%	2,028	16.45%	301	2.44%

Texas Gubernatorial election results for Palo Pinto County
Year	Republican		Democratic		Third party(ies)	
Year	No.	%	No.	%	No.	%
2022	7,896	83.21%	1,486	15.66%	107	1.13%

== See also ==
- National Register of Historic Places listings in Palo Pinto County, Texas
- Recorded Texas Historic Landmarks in Palo Pinto County
