= VIA Primo =

Rapid transit service

VIA Prímo

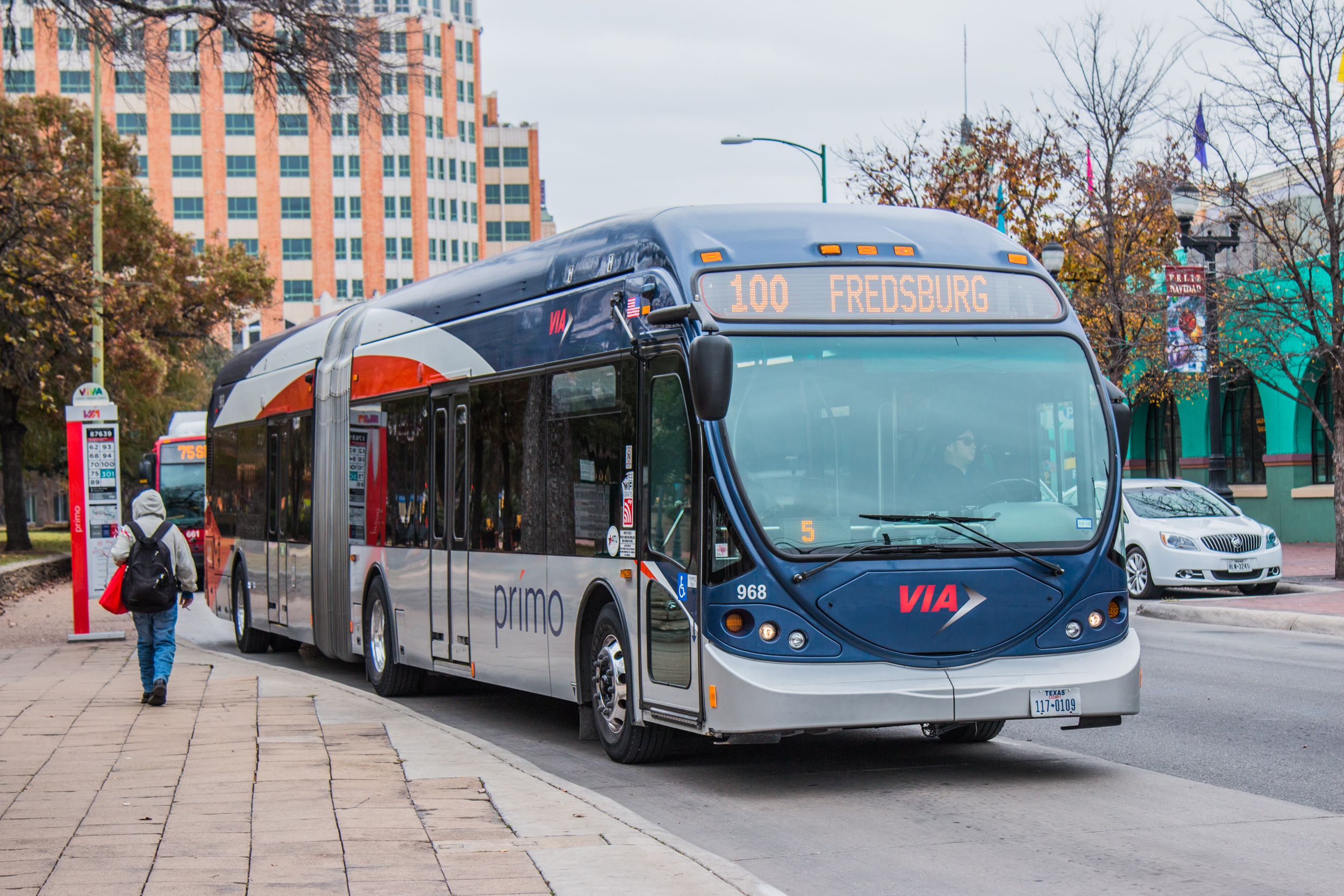

Overview
- Locale: San Antonio
- Transit type: Bus rapid transit
- Number of lines: 3
- Number of stations: 11 (Route 100)
- Daily ridership: 10,629 (November 2023)
- Website: viainfo.net/primo_service

Operation
- Began operation: December 17, 2012
- Operator: VIA Metropolitan Transit
- Number of vehicles: 16 compressed natural gas buses
- Headway: 12 minutes

Technical
- System length: Approx. 33.5 miles (50 km)

VIA Primo (stylized as prímo) is a bus rapid transit service operated by VIA Metropolitan Transit in San Antonio, Texas, United States. As of January 2019, it comprises three lines. Route 100 runs along the Fredericksburg Road corridor, from the Medical Center Transit Center, in the vicinity of the South Texas Medical Center, to Downtown San Antonio. Route 102 serves Military Drive between Kel-Lac Transit Center and Brooks Transit Center. Route 103 travels on Fredericksburg Road and Zarzamora Street from Crossroads Park & Ride to the Madla Transit Center.

From October 2016 to September 2017, Primo accounted for about 5% of total VIA ridership. Route 100 was the second-busiest line in the VIA system, with a ridership of 1,784,796 during that timespan. In May 2019, Primo had an average weekday ridership of 9,280, or about 8.7% of the overall VIA bus average. Route 100 had a slightly higher average than Route 103 (4,833 vs. 4,447). Average weekday Primo ridership in November 2023 was 10,629 across the three routes, or about 13.2% of the overall fixed-route ridership of 80,560 during the same month.

Primo launched on December 17, 2012, as Route 100. An extension to Leon Valley opened in November 2013, complementing the UTSA extension that had operated since Primo's launch. The original route was split in January 2017, with the extensions from the Medical Center Transit Center to UTSA and Leon Valley being re-designated as Route 101 and the core Fredericksburg Road corridor service retaining the Route 100 number. On January 7, 2019, Route 103 began service; on the same date, Route 101 was renumbered as Route 501 and removed from the Primo system. Route 102 opened on August 26, 2019.

== Service ==
=== Fares ===
Primo fares are the same as on VIA's regular, non-express service. As of October 2017, the regular one-way fare is $1.30. Discounted fares are available to students, children 5–11, seniors, active-duty military, and people with disabilities. As of October 2017, this discounted fare is 65 cents. All VIA daily and monthly passes are accepted on Primo buses.

== Routes ==
Route diagram of the Primo system

=== Route 100 ===
Route 100 is the original Primo line. The route begins at the Ellis Alley Park & Ride on the eastern fringe of downtown San Antonio. It then travels through the central part of the city before reaching Centro Plaza. After leaving the plaza, Route 100 uses Interstate 10 (I‑10) to reach Fredericksburg Road. Route 100 has six stations along Fredericksburg Road, including a stop at Wonderland of the Americas in Balcones Heights. The route then turns onto Medical Drive, where two more stations serve the South Texas Medical Center. Route 100 ends at the Medical Center Transit Center, on the corner of Medical Drive and Babcock Road.

=== Route 102 ===
Route 102 runs along Military Drive from the Kel-Lac Transit Center, near Lackland Air Force Base, to the Brooks Transit Center at Brooks City-Base.

=== Route 103 ===
Route 103 runs along Zarzamora Street from the Crossroads Park & Ride near Wonderland of the Americas to the Madla Transit Center near Interstate 35.

=== Former routes ===
==== Route 101 ====
Route 101 started at the UTSA Main Campus along Loop 1604. It served the University Park & Ride at the I‑10/Loop 1604 interchange before continuing on I‑10. The route joined Fredericksburg Road near the headquarters of USAA, following it until turning onto Medical Drive. It stopped at the Medical Center Transit Center, allowing transfers to Route 100. Route 101 then traveled on Babcock Road, Eckhert Road, and Huebner Road before arriving in Leon Valley, where the route ended.

When Route 103 began service on January 7th, 2019, Route 101 was downgraded to a normal Metro route with its route number changed to 501. Route 501 now features a much lower frequency of 60 minutes and has had more stops added while retaining its original Primo service route.

== History ==
=== Planning and construction ===
The planning process for bus rapid transit service in San Antonio began in September 2002. Fredericksburg Road was chosen by VIA as the preferred corridor in September 2006, as a result of studies by VIA and the San Antonio–Bexar County Metropolitan Planning Organization (now the Alamo Area Metropolitan Planning Organization, or AAMPO). While Primo was originally set to include dedicated lanes for buses, VIA settled on mixed traffic operation before submitting the required environmental studies. A draft environmental impact assessment was released for public review on May 10, 2010, and the Federal Transit Administration (FTA) announced a finding of no significant impact on August 30.

Station construction began on February 7, 2012.

=== Launch ===
VIA staged a free preview of Primo on December 15, 2012, and launched regular service two days later.

=== Later developments ===
Primo service was extended to the enclave suburb of Leon Valley on November 4, 2013. The extension was funded in part by an FTA grant of $3 million, and it ran on a half-hourly schedule similar to that of the UTSA extension.

On January 9, 2017, VIA separated the then-existing Primo service into two lines. Service to UTSA and Leon Valley, formerly provided as separate half-hourly extensions from the Medical Center Transit Center, was split into a new Route 101 that ran between UTSA and Leon Valley with a stop at the Medical Center Transit Center. The segment between the Medical Center Transit Center and downtown San Antonio retained the Route 100 numbering.

In September 2015, VIA announced plans to expand Primo service to the Military Drive and Zarzamora Street corridors. Construction began in September 2017, and the new routes were scheduled to be operational by the end of 2018. Route 103, serving the Zarzamora Street corridor, opened on January 7, 2019, and Route 101 was then downgraded out of Primo service on the same day. Route 102, along Military Drive, began operation on August 26, 2019.

=== Impacts of COVID-19 pandemic ===
As a result of the COVID-19 pandemic, VIA suspended fares on all routes on March 21, 2020. On April 6, VIA shifted weekday service to Saturday schedules, reducing frequency on all Primo routes to 15-minute headways. Fare collection for all VIA routes, including Primo, resumed on June 1. On July 27, the weekday frequency of Route 103 was increased to 10-minute headways, while Routes 100 and 102 were increased to 12-minute headways.

== Fleet ==
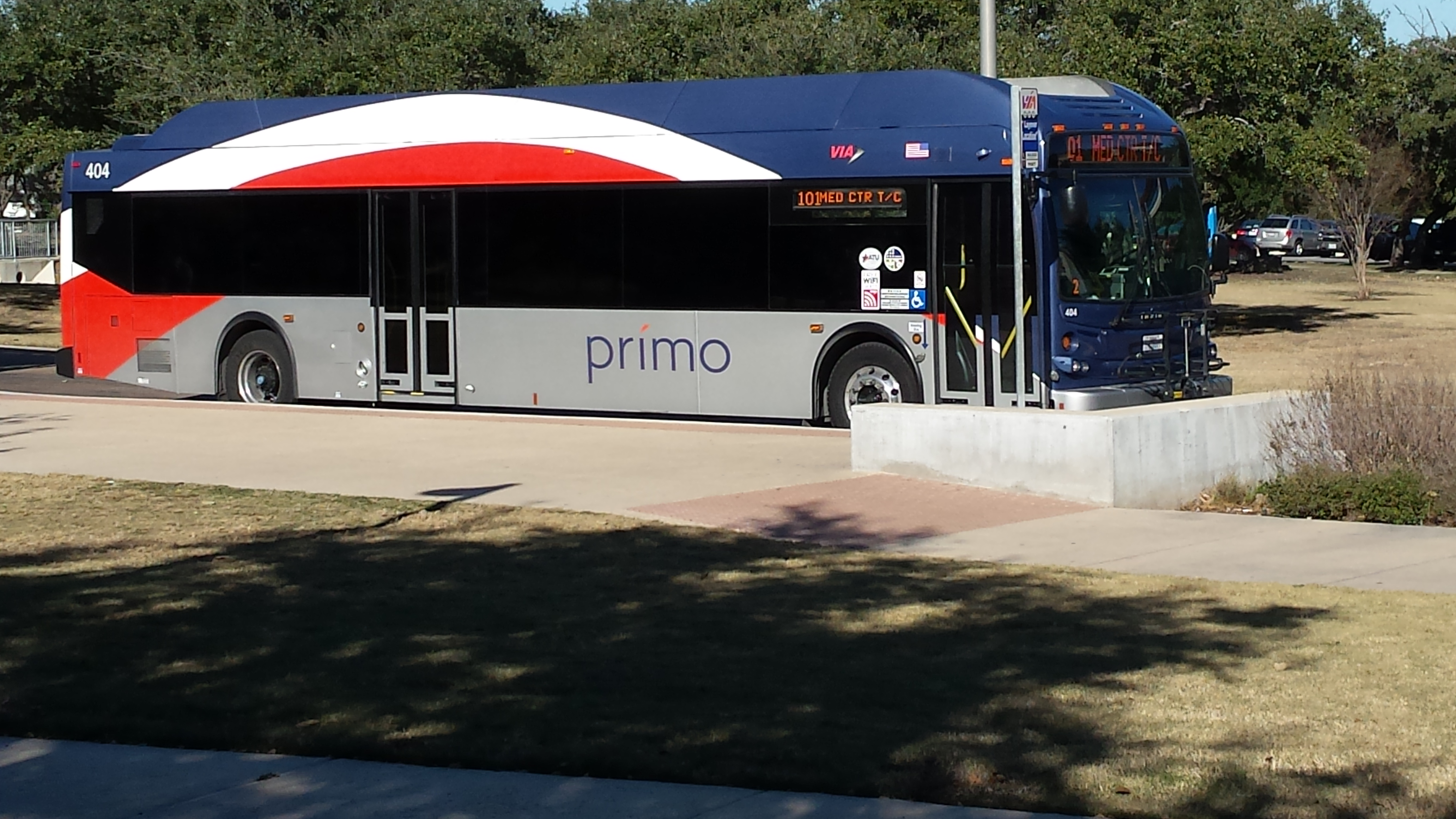
A DE40LFR in Primo livery waiting at the University of Texas at San Antonio Main Campus stop at one of the ends of former Route 101. This bus has now been retired, and this route has now been downgraded to a Metro route.

Primo launched with 16 60-foot (18 m) articulated buses fueled using compressed natural gas (CNG). Each was purchased at a cost of $878,000, using federal funding combined with a 20 percent local match. These buses come with free WiFi, two wheelchair positions, and space for three bicycles in the rear of the vehicle.

Routes 102 and 103 feature multiple modified Nova LFS CNG buses (similar to the majority of the fleet, however they feature plushier seats, and aerodynamic skirts on the top of the bus).

Other buses in the Primo system include two New Flyer Xcelsior XN40 CNG buses (419 and 420) and several Xcelsior XN60 buses. Sometimes, normal buses (primarily standard XN40s, along with the standard Nova LFS CNG) are seen running Primo routes.

Former buses include two specially painted Express route New Flyer DE40LFRs (403 and 404) and two NABI 40-LFW CNG Generation II buses (948 and 949).

== See also ==
- CapMetro Rapid (Austin)
- List of bus rapid transit systems in North America
