= VIA Metropolitan Transit =

Public transport operator in Bexar County, Texas

Coordinates: 29°26′34″N 98°29′58″W

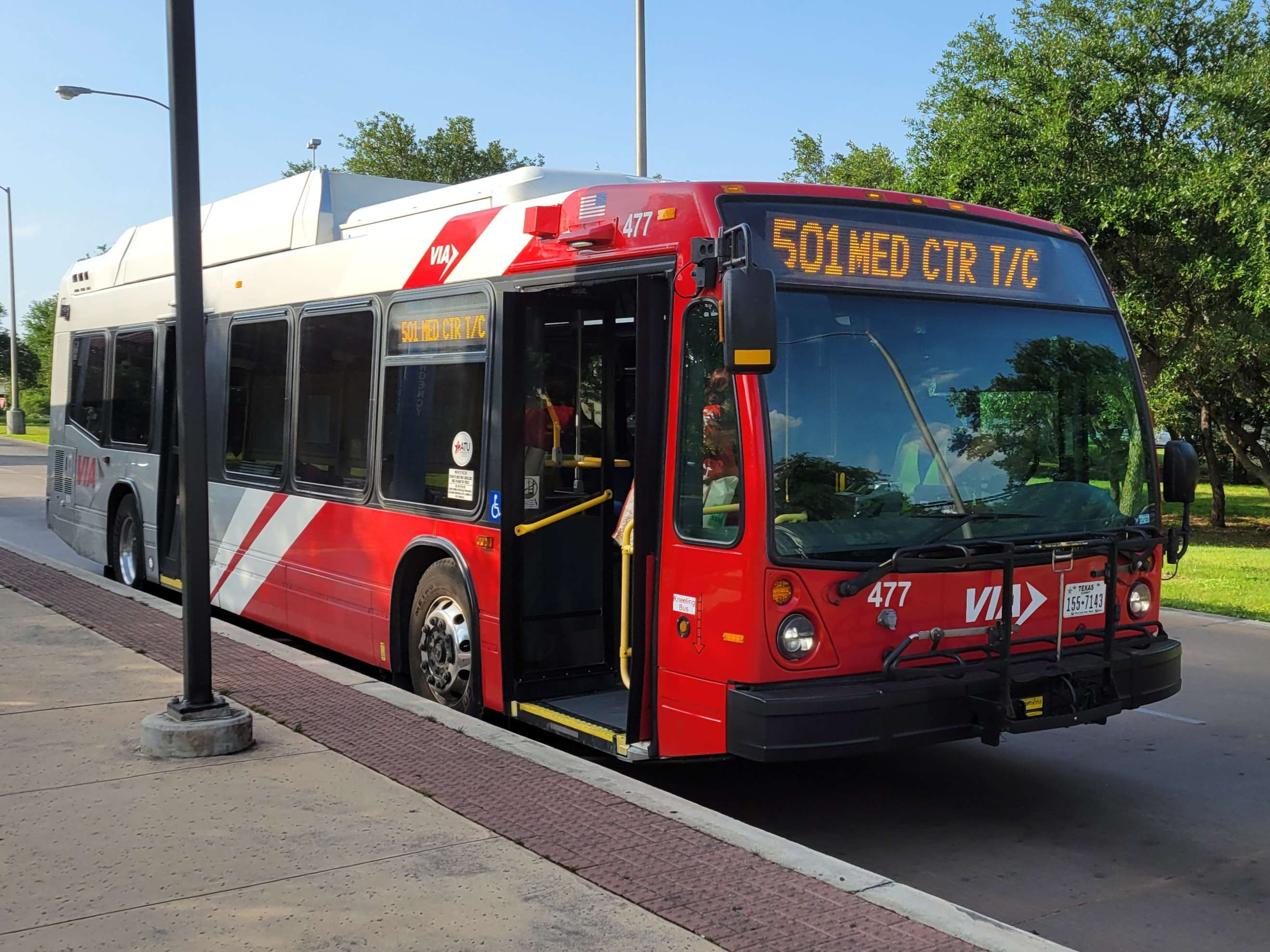
- A VIA bus operating as Route 501 at the UTSA terminal
- Formerly: San Antonio Transit System
- Parent: City of San Antonio and Bexar County
- Founded: 1977
- Headquarters: 123 N. Medina St. San Antonio, Texas; United States
- Service area: Greater San Antonio
- Routes: Total: 95; Prímo: 3 Frequent: 21; Standard: 70
- Stops: 5984
- Hubs: Park & Ride: 10; Transit Center: 9
- Fleet: Bus: 511; Paratransit: 138
- Daily ridership: 105,800 (weekdays, Q2 2026)
- Annual ridership: 30,665,700 (2025)
- Fuel type: CNG; Electric
- Chief executive: Jon Gary Herrera
- Board Chair: Laura Cabanilla
- Website: viainfo.net

VIA Metropolitan Transit Authority (referred to as VIA Metro or simply VIA) is the mass transit agency serving San Antonio, Texas, United States, and its surrounding municipalities. It began operation in 1978 as a successor to the San Antonio Transit System. In 2025, the system had a ridership of 30,665,700, or about 105,800 per weekday as of the second quarter of 2026.

In addition to the city of San Antonio, VIA serves many other Bexar County municipalities, including Alamo Heights, Balcones Heights, Castle Hills, Converse, Kirby, Leon Valley, Olmos Park, Shavano Park, and Terrell Hills. While VIA does not directly serve some Bexar County municipalities such as Hill Country Village, Hollywood Park, Live Oak, Selma, Schertz, Universal City and Windcrest, many of them are within driving proximity of outlying park-and-ride facilities.

== History ==
VIA's original logo, used until 2014

VIA was created in 1977 when the citizens of Bexar County voted in favor of a one-half cent sales tax to fund the service. Subsequently, VIA purchased transit assets from the City of San Antonio and began operations in March 1978, taking its name from the Latin word for "road". In 2004, city voters in San Antonio approved the formation of the Advanced Transportation District. This quarter-cent sales tax expanded and improved VIA operations.

VIA has received several accolades from the American Public Transportation Association, most notably the award for Best Transit System in North America in 1990, as well as several of APTA's safety awards in multiple years.

VIA added a limited-stop bus service known as Prímo to the Fredericksburg Road corridor on December 17, 2012. Designated as Route 100, it connects the South Texas Medical Center to Downtown San Antonio. The route had connected the main campus of the University of Texas at San Antonio to its downtown campus using an extension from the Medical Center to the UTSA Main Campus, as well as a second extension that ran from the Medical Center to the nearby independent city of Leon Valley until January 2017 (when the extensions were split into Route 101 which later became Route 501 in January 2019). An expansion of Prímo to Zarzamora Street opened in January 2019 and an expansion to Military Drive opened in late August 2019, additionally VIA is looking into other corridors to which to add improved bus transit in the coming decades.

In March 2020, fares on all VIA services were temporarily suspended due to the COVID-19 pandemic. The fare suspension was set to last until April 1, 2020, but was later extended until the end of May 2020. On April 6, 2020, VIA implemented temporary service changes, including temporarily suspending some routes, implementing capacity limits on buses, and changing their fleet to Saturday service hours. On April 27, 2020, VIA implemented further temporary service changes, including suspending additional routes and further decreasing frequency. Fare collection continued on June 1, 2020, and capacity limits were later removed on June 1, 2021.

== Services ==
VIA operates over 500 wheelchair accessible buses on 75 bus routes, serving the entire city of San Antonio and most of Bexar County. About 36 million trips are made on VIA every year. The bus routes are separated into Frequent, and Standard Service types. VIA additionally provides special event service from its Park & Ride locations to events such as San Antonio Spurs basketball games at the Frost Bank Center, selected annual Fiesta San Antonio activities, and the San Antonio Stock Show & Rodeo. VIA also offers "VIAtrans" paratransit services for disabled travelers.

Fares for VIA have remained relatively modest during its existence. At its inception in 1978, fares were 25¢ for most routes. Fares for most fixed routes during 2006 were 80¢, and a monthly bus pass was $20, much lower than most other transit systems in the country. On January 1, 2007, basic fares were raised to $1, and monthly pass prices were raised to $25. Basic fares increased to $1.10 and monthly pass prices were raised to $30 on January 1, 2009. On March 1, 2014, the basic bus fare was $1.20; day passes were $4 and a 31-day pass was $35. As of January 1, 2016, the base fare is $1.30, express fares are $2.60, 24-Hour passes are $2.75, 7-day passes are $12, and 31-day passes are $38. Children 4 years old and under ride fare-free. On November 9, 2019, transfers became free and can be requested when paying to board the bus. To transfer from a local to an express bus, the difference of the service must be paid. One-day, seven-day and 31-day passes are accepted on all routes except for VIAtrans and Special Event Service.

High school, college, and trade students are able to purchase a semester pass for $38 with proof of enrollment. Upon boarding, students must display valid VIA-issued IDs, or school IDs with stickers for the semester. Students, faculty, and staff attending or working for the Alamo Colleges District, Our Lady of the Lake University, Texas A&M San Antonio, the University of Texas at San Antonio, and the University of the Incarnate Word can ride the bus for free by showing their school-issued goMobile pass as part of VIA's U-Pass program.

=== Bus service types ===
The color of a route is assigned by its average off-peak frequency. Some routes contain portions of their route which operate at lesser service types.

Service Type	Service Color	Service Description
Prímo	Red	Prímo Service is the designation for a special skip-stop service. These routes run along heavy ridership corridors throughout the city, operating every 12–15 minutes.
Frequent	Red	Frequent Service is the designation for routes which operate every 15–20 minutes.
Standard	Cyan Cobalt Blue	Standard Service routes of this color operate every 30 minutes.
Standard	Dupain	Standard Service routes of this color operate every 40–60 minutes, with some routes having sections that run during peak hours only.
Standard	Butterbrot	Standard Service routes of this color operate at a frequency greater than 60 minutes.

=== Special event service ===
VIA runs special service for major events in San Antonio, ranging from sporting events such as UTSA home football games, San Antonio Spurs home games, the annual Valero Alamo Bowl, and events such as the Monster Jam, Fiesta San Antonio, and The Texas Folklife Festival. Park & Ride Service is usually offered from the Randolph and Crossroads Park & Ride as well as the Frank Madla Transit Center. The cost for the service is $1.30 one way, $2.60 round trip with discounts for students, children 5–11, seniors 62+, and persons with disabilities.

=== VIA Link service ===
On May 4, 2019, VIA launched a new ride-share service in the Northeast San Antonio area which promised more frequent service reliability as well as more flexible drop off points compared to traditional fixed route service.

This service was later expanded to the Northwest Side in 2021, the South Side in 2022, southeast of Randolph Transit Center in 2023, Downtown in 2024 to also include The Little Runner, which shuttles UTSA students between the UTSA Downtown Campus and its surrounding parking lots, and the southeast side in 2025.

Zone Name	Area	Date Launched	Retired Bus Routes
Naco Pass Zone	North of Wurzbach Parkway in Uptown Central, Northeast Lakeview College	May 4, 2019	640, 641, 642
Mainland Zone	Southeast of Loop 1604 in the Northwest Side and Far West Side	October 2, 2021	605, 660 (October 25, 2021)
Mainland Zone	Southeast of Loop 1604 in the Northwest Side and Far West Side	October 2, 2021	606 (May 16, 2022)
Madla Zone	South of Loop 410 in the South Side	August 8, 2022	Service to Palo Alto College on Route 524, 672
Randolph Zone	West of Walzem Rd. in the Northeast Side, Northeast Lakeview College	October 23, 2023	629, 630
Downtown Zone	Centro San Antonio Public Improvement District (PID)	September 2, 2024	
Southeast Zone	Southeast, Brooks City-Base, China Grove, Lakeside, Sandy Oaks	November 3, 2025	Service to Huntleigh on Route 25

=== Keep San Antonio Moving ===
The public with a 68% vote approved the Keep San Antonio Moving in October 2020. The plan has three primary projects:

- VIA Advanced Rapid Transit (ART), a bus rapid transit system. The first route, the Green Line, planned to run north-south along San Pedro Avenue between San Antonio International Airport and through Downtown to the Missions area, started construction in 2025 and is planned to be opened for service in April 2028. A second route, the Silver Line, planned to run east-west through Downtown between Frost Bank Center and the area near Our Lady of the Lake University to General McMullen Drive, is currently in the design phase and projected to open in 2031. Additionally, VIA will open a second operations and maintenance facility, which both ART routes will be based out of.
- Better Bus, a service improvement plan that will expand service to areas currently not served by buses, increase service so that all routes run every 30 minutes or less during all hours of service, increase service and operating spans on key bus routes and better integrate the bus network with VIA Link. Additionally, as part of the Better Bus Plan, the Green Line would be extended southward to Brooks Transit Center and the Silver Line would be extended on its western and eastern ends to Kel-Lac Transit Center and the future Eastside Transit Center. Implementation started in April 2025 and is expected to happen in phases through 2030.
- VIA Link expansion, expanding the aforementioned rideshare service to improve coverage in neighborhoods and suburban cities within VIA's jurisdiction so that over 80% of jobs and the population are within half a mile of transit.

== Governance ==
VIA is governed by an eleven-member Board of Trustees, all of whom have two-year terms.

Ten of the trustees are appointed by the various governmental entities in Bexar County—the City of San Antonio appoints five members, the Bexar County Commissioners Court appoints three, and the mayors of the suburban cities acting in concert appoint two. The appointed trustees then elect a chairperson as the Board's eleventh member. The current President and CEO is Jon Gary Herrera.

== Current routes ==
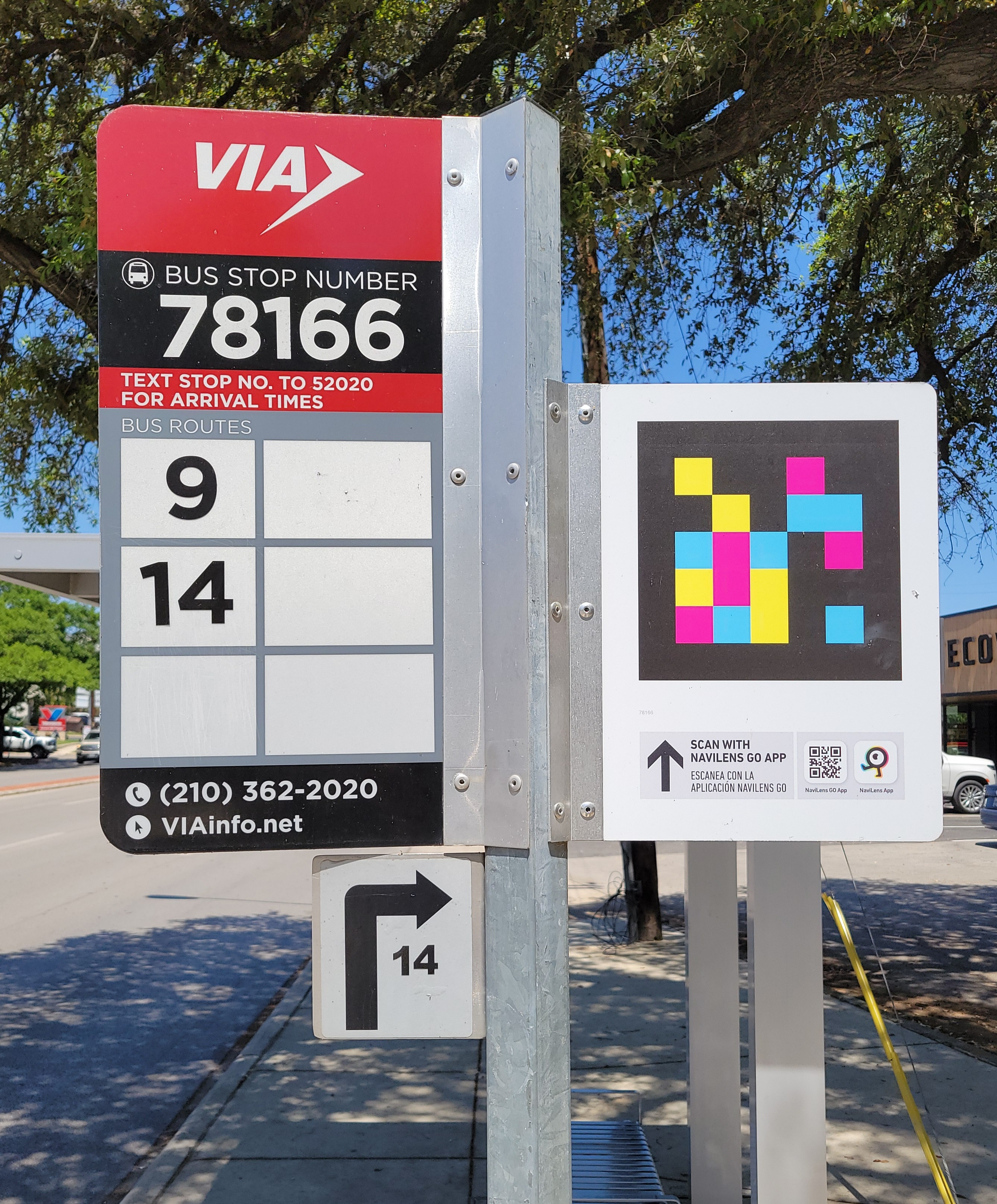
Typical VIA bus stop signage featuring a NaviLens code

The following is a list of VIA's routes as of the service changes on August 24, 2026. Many routes that travel through Downtown San Antonio or change directions at a major transfer point continue with a different number; this route pair is also indicated.

=== Radial routes ===
Radial routes are numbered from 1–99, providing service to Downtown and travel along major streets.

The route numbers increase clockwise starting at Interstate 10 northwest of Downtown:

- Route 2 travels northbound
- Route 25 travels eastbound
- Route 44 travels southbound
- Route 76 travels westbound

Route	Route Name	Terminals			Major Destination Points	Route Pair	Service notes
2	Frequent Service						
2	Blanco; Frequent	Sir Winston & Parliament	↔	Pecan & St. Mary's (southbound) Pecan & Navarro (northbound)	Parliament Square; Downtown	77	
3	Frequent Service						
3	San Pedro; Skip	North Star Transit Center	↔	Centro Plaza	North Star T/C; Centro Plaza; Downtown	76	
4	Frequent Service						
4	San Pedro; Frequent	North Star Transit Center	↔	St. Mary's & Martin (southbound) Commerce & Bowie (northbound)	North Star T/C; Downtown	28	
5	Standard Service						
5	McCullough	San Antonio International Airport	↔	St. Mary's & Pecan (southbound) Navarro & Villita (northbound)	San Antonio International Airport; Olmos Park; North Star Mall; North Star T/C; Downtown	36	
7	Standard Service						
7	US 281 Stone Oak Express	Stone Oak Park & Ride	↔	Navarro & Villita	Stone Oak P/R; San Antonio International Airport; Downtown		
8	Standard Service						
8	North; St. Mary's	Randolph Transit Center	↔	St. Mary's & Martin (southbound) Navarro & Villita (northbound)	Randolph T/C; Alamo Heights; University of the Incarnate Word; Trinity University; Downtown	67	Half of 8 buses do not continue as Route 67 on weekdays
9	Standard Service						
9	Broadway	Naco Pass	↔	Martin & Navarro (southbound) S. Flores & Dolorosa (northbound)	Naco Pass; Alamo Heights; Downtown	51	
10	Frequent Service						
10	Nacogdoches; Skip	Naco Pass	↔	Centro Plaza	Naco Pass; Alamo Heights; Downtown		
14	Frequent Service						
14	Perrin Beitel; Skip	Naco Pass	↔	Centro Plaza	Naco Pass; Alamo Heights; University of the Incarnate Word; Downtown; Centro Plaza	66	Half of 14 buses do not continue as Route 66
17	Standard Service						
17	IH-35; Express	Randolph Transit Center	↔	Commerce & Presa (westbound) Centro Plaza (eastbound)	Randolph T/C; Centro Plaza; Downtown	93	
20	Frequent Service						
20	New Braunfels; Frequent	Brooks Transit Center	↔	Centro Plaza	Brooks T/C; State Hospital; McCreless Marketplace; San Antonio College; Centro Plaza	68	
21	Frequent Service						
21	Kirby / Ventura; Frequent	FM 78 & Crestway	↔	Martin & Navarro (westbound) Navarro & Villita (eastbound)	Converse; Kirby; Downtown	34	
22	Standard Service						
22	Hays	Hines & Dignowity	↔	Martin & Navarro (westbound) Navarro & Villita (eastbound)	University Health Robert Hillard Center; Downtown	43	
24	Frequent Service						
24	East Houston	Dietrich Road Apartments	↔	Centro Plaza	Towne Twin Village; Frost Bank Center; Downtown; Centro Plaza		Trips alternate between Dietrich Road Apartments and Houston & Lynhaven terminals
24	East Houston	Houston & Lynhaven	↔	Centro Plaza	Towne Twin Village; Frost Bank Center; Downtown; Centro Plaza		Trips alternate between Dietrich Road Apartments and Houston & Lynhaven terminals
25	Frequent Service						
25	East Commerce; Frequent	Houston & Lynhaven	↔	Martin & Jefferson (westbound) Centro Plaza (eastbound)	Huntleigh Park; Ellis Alley Park & Ride; Downtown; Centro Plaza	75	
26	Standard Service						
26	Martin Luther King	Lone Oak Mall	↔	Centro Plaza	Eastwood Village; Alamodome; Centro Plaza; Downtown	44	
28	Frequent Service						
28	Porter; Frequent	Rigsby & Loop 410 North	↔	Commerce & Bowie (westbound) St. Mary's & Martin (eastbound)	Dellcrest; Southcross; Downtown	4	Trips alternate between traveling along Rice and Southcross
30	Standard Service						
30	Rigsby	Foster Meadows & Southon View	↔	Navarro & Villita (westbound) St. Mary's & Pecan (eastbound)	H-E-B Distribution Center at Foster Rd.; Dellcrest; Comanche Park; Downtown	90	Makes an extended trip to the Foster Road H-E-B Distribution facility during peak hours only
32	Standard Service						
32	Steves	Lebanon & Goliad	↔	Navarro & Villita (westbound) St. Mary's & Martin (eastbound)	Brookside; Brooks T/C; Highland Hills; Texas Department of Human Services; Downtown	96	
34	Frequent Service						
34	South St. Mary's; Frequent	Brooks Transit Center	↔	Navarro & Villita (northbound) Martin & Navarro (southbound)	Brooks T/C; McCreless Marketplace; Juvenile Detention Center; Downtown	21	Makes an extended trip to the San Antonio Lighthouse for the Blind and/or the Lighthouse for the Blind Annex during peak hours only
36	Standard Service						
36	South Presa	Brooks Transit Center	↔	Navarro & Villita (northbound) St. Mary's & Pecan (southbound)	Brooks T/C; New Braunfels State Hospital; Downtown	5	Trips alternate between traveling along Hotwells and S. Presa
42	Standard Service						
42	Roosevelt	Navistar	↔	Navarro & Villita (northbound) Pecan & S. St. Mary's (southbound)	Navistar; Villa Coronado; TJ Maxx Distribution Center; Mission Del Lago; Downtown	88	Makes an extended trip to the Navistar Advanced Technology Center and/or TJ Maxx Distribution Center during peak hours only on weekdays; Serves the San Antonio Lighthouse for the Blind on weekdays, and during peak hours on Saturday only
42	Roosevelt	Mission Del Lago	↔	Navarro & Villita (northbound) Pecan & S. St. Mary's (southbound)	Navistar; Villa Coronado; TJ Maxx Distribution Center; Mission Del Lago; Downtown	88	Makes an extended trip to the Navistar Advanced Technology Center and/or TJ Maxx Distribution Center during peak hours only on weekdays; Serves the San Antonio Lighthouse for the Blind on weekdays, and during peak hours on Saturday only
43	Standard Service						
43	South Flores	Commercial & Gillette	↔	Dolorosa & Flores (northbound) Martin & Navarro (southbound)	Kingsborough; Bellaire; Downtown	22	
44	Standard Service						
44	Pleasanton	Texas A&M San Antonio	↔	Centro Plaza	Texas A&M University–San Antonio; Moursund @ Loop 410; Downtown; Centro Plaza	26	
46	Standard Service						
46	Commercial	Palo Alto College	↔	Centro Plaza	Palo Alto College; Kingsborough; Frank Madla T/C; Centro Plaza		
51	Standard Service						
51	Nogalitos	Madla Transit Center	↔	Navarro & Villita (northbound) Martin & Navarro (southbound)	Frank Madla T/C; South Park Mall; Downtown	9	Late night trips do not continue as route 9 and instead loop out in downtown as the 51.
62	Standard Service						
62	Kirk	Clarence Tinker Dr. & Perrin Rd.	↔	Centro Plaza	Port San Antonio; Downtown; Centro Plaza	89	Late night trips do not continue as route 89 and instead loop out at Centro Plaza as the 62.
64	Standard Service						
64	US 90 / Alamo Ranch; Express	Alamo Ranch Parkway & Alamo Parkway	↔	Dolorosa & Main	Alamo Ranch; Northwest Vista College; Kel-Lac T/C; Downtown		
66	Standard Service						
66	Ceralvo	University Family Health Center Southwest	↔	Centro Plaza	University Southwest Family Health Center; Downtown; Centro Plaza	14	
67	Standard Service						
67	Laredo	Las Palmas Shopping Center	↔	Navarro & Villita (northbound) St. Mary's & Martin (southbound)	Las Palmas Shopping Center; Downtown	8	
68	Frequent Service						
68	Guadalupe; Frequent	University Family Health Center Southwest	↔	Centro Plaza	University Southwest Family Center; Las Palmas Shopping Center; Centro Plaza; Downtown	20	
75	Frequent Service						
75	West Commerce; Frequent	University Family Health Center Southwest	↔	Centro Plaza (eastbound) Martin & Jefferson (westbound)	University Southwest Family Health Center; Our Lady of the Lake University; Downtown; Centro Plaza	25	Trips alternate between traveling along El Paso and Acme Rd.
76	Frequent Service						
76	West Commerce; Skip	Kel-Lac Transit Center	↔	Centro Plaza	Kel-Lac T/C; Our Lady of the Lake University; Downtown; Centro Plaza	3	
77	Frequent Service						
77	Martin / Las Palmas; Frequent	Las Palmas Shopping Center	↔	Pecan & Navarro (eastbound) Pecan & St. Mary's (westbound)	Las Palmas Shopping Center; Downtown	2	
79	Standard Service						
79	Ruiz / Culebra Park	Mira Vista & Culebra	↔	Pecan & Navarro (eastbound) Martin & Navarro (westbound)	Culebra Park; Rosedale Park; University Downtown Health Center		
82	Frequent Service						
82	Culebra; Frequent	Ingram Transit Center	↔	Pecan & St. Mary's (southbound) St. Mary's & Martin (northbound)	Ingram T/C; Ingram Mall; Northside Athletic Complex; Southwest Research Center; St. Mary's University; Downtown	95	
88	Frequent Service						
88	Bandera; Frequent	Bandera & Mainland	↔	Pecan & St. Mary's (southbound) Navarro & Villita (northbound)	Mainland; Leon Valley; Downtown	42	Trips alternate between traveling along Bandera Rd. and Evers Rd.; Half of 88 buses do not continue as Route 42
89	Standard Service						
89	Poplar	Ingram Transit Center	↔	Centro Plaza	Ingram T/C; University Health Robert B. Green Campus; Downtown; Centro Plaza	62	
90	Standard Service						
90	Woodlawn	Ingram Transit Center	↔	St. Mary's & Pecan (eastbound) Navarro & Villita (westbound)	Ingram T/C; Ingram Mall; St. Mary's University; San Antonio College; Downtown	30	
92	Standard Service						
92	Brooks / Medical Center Express	Medical Center Transit Center	↔	Brooks Transit Center	Medical Center T/C; Crossroads P/R; Centro Plaza; Brooks T/C		Weekday peak service only between 5–9am and 2–7pm
93	Frequent Service						
93	Roadrunner; Express	The Rim	↔	Centro Plaza (eastbound) Commerce & Presa (westbound)	The Rim; Shops at La Cantera; UTSA; Crossroads P/R; Centro Plaza; UTSA Downtown; Downtown	17	Some 93 buses do not continue as Route 17 on weekdays. These buses continue past the Centro Plaza and loop around at the Convention Center.
93	Roadrunner; Express	The Rim	↔	Convention Center	The Rim; Shops at La Cantera; UTSA; Crossroads P/R; Centro Plaza; UTSA Downtown; Downtown	17	Some 93 buses do not continue as Route 17 on weekdays. These buses continue past the Centro Plaza and loop around at the Convention Center.
95	Frequent Service						
95	Fredericksburg Rd. Frequent	Medical Center Transit Center	↔	St. Mary's & Martin (southbound) Pecan & St. Mary's (northbound)	Medical Center T/C; Crossroads P/R; Deco District; Downtown	82	
96	Frequent Service						
96	Vance Jackson; Frequent	UTSA	↔	St. Mary's & Martin (southbound) Navarro & Villita (northbound)	UTSA; University Heights Business Park; Deco District; Downtown	32	Half of 96 buses do not continue as Route 32
97	Standard Service						
97	West Ave.	The Rim	↔	St. Mary's & Martin (southbound) Navarro & Villita (northbound)	The Rim; University Heights Business Park; Castle Hills; Deco District; Downtown		Trips alternate between The Rim and Silicon & DeZevala terminals; Makes an extended trip to Talavera Ridge Rd. during peak hours only; Does not go to University Heights on Sundays
97	West Ave.	Silicon & DeZevala	↔	St. Mary's & Martin (southbound) Navarro & Villita (northbound)	The Rim; University Heights Business Park; Castle Hills; Deco District; Downtown		Trips alternate between The Rim and Silicon & DeZevala terminals; Makes an extended trip to Talavera Ridge Rd. during peak hours only; Does not go to University Heights on Sundays

=== Prímo routes ===
Prímo routes are high frequency skip-stop routes that operate on heavy ridership corridors. Route 100 features stations along Fredericksburg Road and Medical Drive, while Routes 102 and 103 feature enhanced bus stops with real-time arrival information. The northern portion of Route 103 also uses Fredericksburg Road's stations.

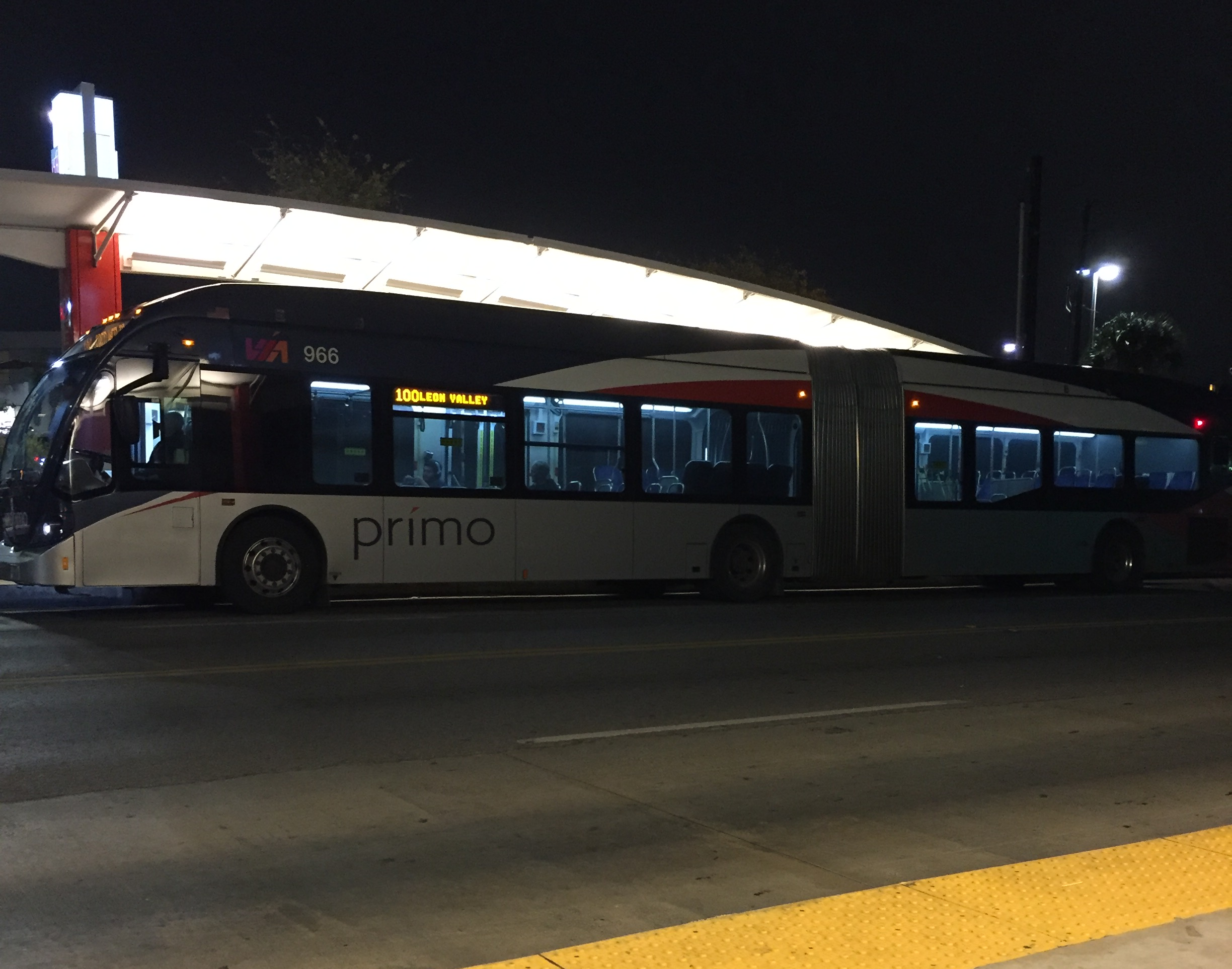
Prímo Bus Departing the Northbound Mary Louise Station to The Medical Center T/C

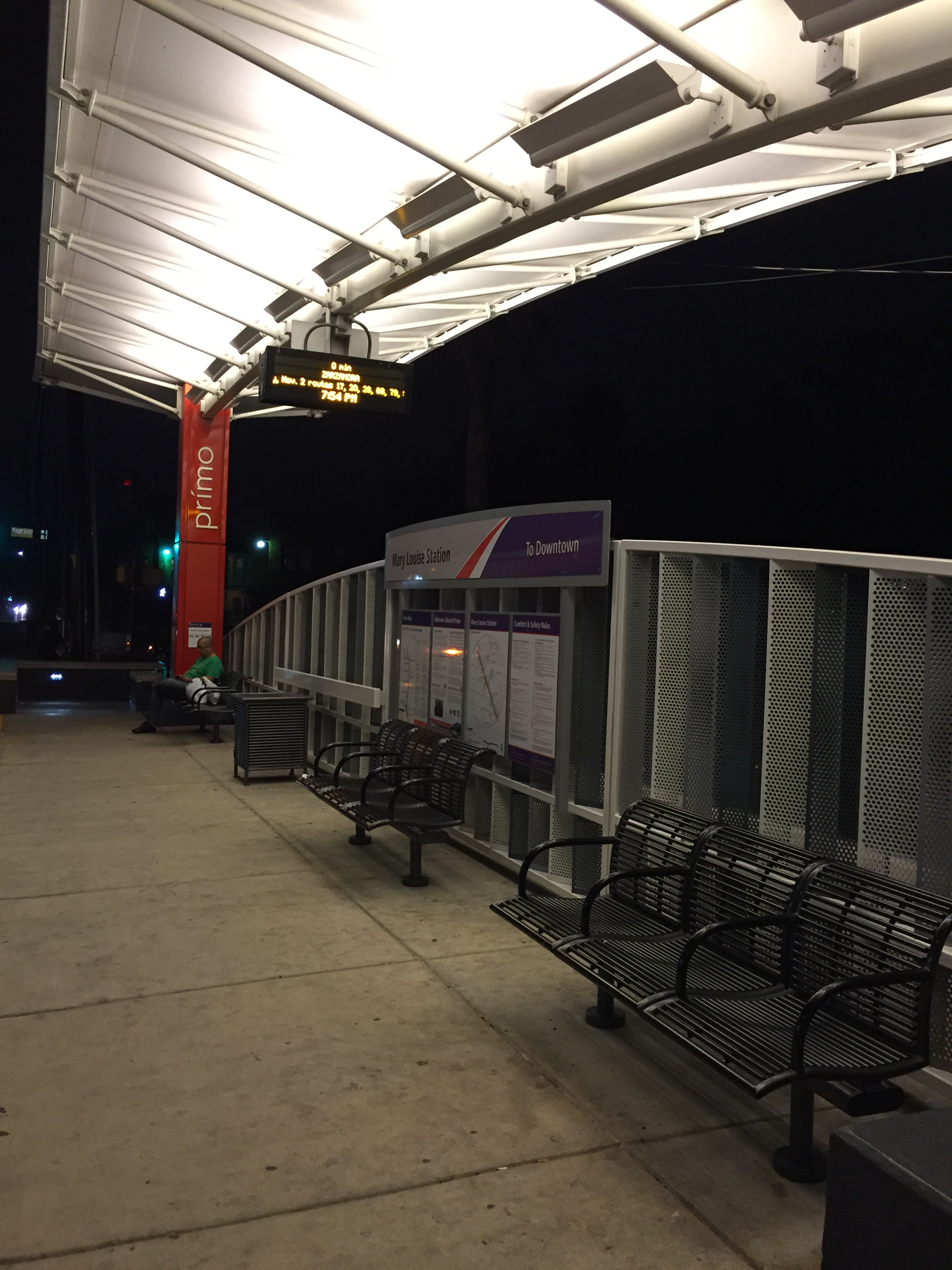
Mary Louise Southbound Prímo Station to Downtown & Madla T/C

Route	Route Name	Terminals			Major Destination Points	Stations	Service notes
100	Prímo Service						
100	Fredericksburg Road	Medical Center Transit Center	↔	Ellis Alley Park & Ride	Ellis Alley P/R; Downtown; Centro Plaza; Medical Center; Medical Center T/C	University Hospital; Ewing Halsell; Callaghan; Crossroads; De Chantle; Babcock; Mary Louise; Huisache	Operates only at Prímo stations on Fredericksburg Road; Skips stops in Downtown; Provides courtesy stops at all bus stops between the Babcock Station and Ewing Halsell Station during Lineup Service.
102	Prímo Service						
102	Military	Kel-Lac Transit Center	↔	Brooks Transit Center	Kel-Lac T/C; Lackland AFB; South Park Mall; Brooks T/C	No stations	
103	Prímo Service						
103	Zarzamora	Madla Transit Center	↔	Crossroads Park & Ride	Madla T/C; Basilica of the National Shrine of the Little Flower; Deco District; Crossroads P/R	De Chantle; Babcock; Mary Louise	Operates only at Prímo stations on Fredericksburg road

=== Lineup routes ===
Lineup routes are numbered from 200–299.

At 10:30pm, 11:30pm, and 12:30am, all buses that are part of a lineup route will arrive northwest of Travis Park and leave Downtown to provide riders with a final opportunity to arrive at their final destinations.

The last two digits of each route number is inherited from the number of the base route that heads away from Downtown (e.g. Route 275 inherits its route number from Route 75 instead of Route 67, as the bus leaves downtown following Route 75).

Route	Route Name	Terminals			Routes Served	Route Description
204	Standard Service					
204	San Pedro / McCullough	Martin & Navarro	↔	North Star Transit Center	4; 5	Travels to North Star Transit Center via Route 4 northbound; Travels to Martin & Navarro via Route 5 southbound
214	Standard Service					
214	Austin Hwy / Randolph	Pecan & Navarro	↔	Randolph Transit Center	14; 17	Travels to Randolph Transit Center via Route 14 northbound; Travels to Pecan & Navarro via Route 17 westbound
222	Standard Service					
222	Hays / E. Houston	Pecan & Navarro	↔	Hines & Dignowity	22; 24	Travels to Hines & Dignowity via Route 22 eastbound, and continues to W.W. White & Springfield on IH-35; Travels to Pecan & Navarro via Route 24 westbound
225	Standard Service					
225	E. Commerce / M.L. King	Pecan & Navarro	↔	Houston & Kenmar	25; 26	Travels to Houston & Kenmar via Route 25 eastbound, and continues to W.W. White & Martin Luther King; Travels to Pecan & Navarro via Route 26 westbound
230	Standard Service					
230	Rigsby / Porter	Pecan & Navarro	↔	Rigsby & W.W. White	28; 30	Travels to Rigsby & W.W. White via Route 30 southbound; Travels to Pecan & Navarro via Route 28 westbound on Southcross
232	Standard Service					
232	Steves Ave / S. St. Mary's	Pecan & Navarro	↔	Goliad & S.E. Military Dr.	32; 34	Travels to Goliad & S. E. Military Dr. via Route 32 southbound; Travels to Pecan & Navarro via Route 34 northbound
242	Standard Service					
242	Roosevelt / S. Presa	Pecan & Navarro	↔	Brooks Transit Center	36; 42	Travels to Brooks Transit Center via Route 42 southbound; Travels to Pecan & Navarro via Route 36 northbound on Hotwells
268	Standard Service					
268	Guadalupe St. / Ceralvo	St. Mary's & Martin	↔	Castroville & S.W. 36th	66; 68	Travels to Castroville & S.W. 36th via Route 68 westbound; Travels to St. Mary's & Martin via Route 66 eastbound, and follows Route 17 eastbound within Downtown
275	Standard Service					
275	Commerce / Laredo	St. Mary's & Martin	↔	Las Palmas Shopping Ctr.	67; 75	Travels to Acme Rd & Old Highway 90 via Route 75 westbound, and continues eastbound via Eldridge Ave. Briefly follows Route 75 eastbound until El Paso & Gen. McMullen, and travels southbound on General McMullen until arriving at Las Palmas Shopping Ctr.; Travels to St. Mary's & Martin via Route 67 northbound
276	Standard Service					
276	Commerce / Kel-Lac Transit Ctr.	St. Mary's & Martin	↔	Kel-Lac Transit Center	64; 76	Travels to Kel-Lac Transit Center via Route 76 westbound; Travels to St. Mary's & Martin via Route 64 eastbound
282	Standard Service					
282	Culebra	St. Mary's & Martin	↔	Ingram Transit Center	82	Route identical to daytime 82
288	Standard Service					
288	Bandera / Evers Rd.	St. Mary's & Martin	↔	Loop 410 & Bandera	88	Travels to Loop 410 & Bandera via Route 88 northbound; Travels to St. Mary's & Martin via Route 88 southbound
289	Standard Service					
289	Poplar / Woodlawn	Pecan & Navarro	↔	Ingram Rd. & Callaghan	89; 90	Travels to Ingram Rd. & Callaghan via Route 89 northbound; Travels to Pecan & Navarro via Route 90 eastbound

=== Crosstown routes ===
Crosstown routes are numbered from 500–599, providing service on major travel corridors that are outside of Downtown.

Route	Route Name	Terminals			Major Destination Points	Route Pair	Service notes
501	Standard Service						
501	UTSA / Leon Valley	UTSA	↔	Poss & Bandera	UTSA; South Texas Medical Center; Medical Center T/C; Leon Valley		
502	Standard Service						
502	Thousand Oaks / Converse	FM 78 & Crestway	↔	North Star Transit Center	Converse; Ventura; Randolph T/C; Morgan's Wonderland; Naco Pass; North Star T/C	649	
503	Standard Service						
503	Huebner Crosstown	Medical Center Transit Center	↔	Stone Oak Park & Ride	Medical Center T/C; Stone Oak; Stone Oak P/R	602	
505	Standard Service						
505	Basse	Randolph Transit Center	↔	Crossroads Park & Ride	Randolph T/C; Crossroads P/R		
509	Standard Service						
509	Hildebrand	Crossroads Park & Ride	↔	Randolph Transit Center	Randolph T/C; Alamo Heights; Deco District; Crossroads P/R		No Sunday service
515	Standard Service						
515	Southcross	Madla Transit Center	↔	New Sulphur Springs & Southcross Ranch	Southcross Ranch; McCreless Marketplace; South San; Frank Madla T/C		
522	Standard Service						
522	Babcock	Laureate & Clark	↔	Las Palmas Shopping Ctr.	Woodway Park; Medical Center T/C; Las Palmas Shopping Center		
524	Frequent Service						
524	General McMullen; Frequent	Madla Transit Center	↔	Crossroads Park & Ride	Crossroads P/R; Balcones Heights; Las Palmas Shopping Center; Port San Antonio; Frank Madla T/C		
534	Frequent Service						
534	Wurzbach; Frequent	Ingram Transit Center	↔	North Star Transit Center	Ingram T/C; Ingram Park Mall; Medical Center T/C; North Star T/C		
552	Frequent Service						
552	Loop 410 / W.W. White; Skip	Kel-Lac Transit Center	↔	Brooks Transit Center	Kel-Lac T/C; Ingram T/C; Crossroads P/R; North Star T/C; Randolph T/C; Brooks T/C		

=== Circulator routes ===
Circulator routes are numbered from 600–699, providing local service within residential areas and allowing transfers to other lines at transit centers.

The route number also encodes the general area that the route serves:

- Routes 602–609 serve the South Texas Medical Center
- Routes 610 and 620 serve the area west of Ingram Transit Center
- Routes 611–619 serve Kel-Lac Transit Center
- Route 632 serves Randolph Transit Center
- Routes 647–649 serve North Star Transit Center

Route	Route Name	Terminals			Major Destination Points	Route Pair	Service notes
602	Standard Service						
602	North Star / Medical Center	Blossom Athletic Center	↔	Medical Center Transit Center	Blossom Athletic Center; Castle Hills; Medical Center T/C	503	
603	Standard Service						
603	Medical Center / UTSA	UTSA	↔	Medical Ctr. Transit Ctr.	UTSA; Medical Center T/C	604	Half of 603 buses do not continue as Route 604 on weekdays
604	Standard Service						
604	Medical Center / University Heights	Silicon & DeZavala	↔	Medical Center Transit Center	University Heights Business Park; Medical Center T/C	603	
607	Standard Service						
607	Medical Center / Ingram	Ingram Transit Center	↔	Medical Center Transit Center	Ingram T/C; Medical Center T/C	610	
609	Standard Service						
609	South Texas Medical Center / Ingram / Kel-Lac	Medical Center Transit Center	↔	Ingram Transit Center	Medical Center T/C; Ingram T/C; Kel-Lac T/C	618	
610	Standard Service						
610	Ingram / Northwest Crossing	Cliffbrier & Culebra	↔	Ingram Transit Center	Northwest Crossing; Ingram T/C	607	
611	Standard Service						
611	Hidden Cove / Valley-Hi / Kel-Lac	Lake Vista	↔	Kel-Lac Transit Center	Hidden Cove; Valley Hi; Kel-Lac T/C		The Walmart on Ray Ellison is served by Southbound buses only
612	Standard Service						
612	Kel-Lac / Westlakes / Ingram	Ingram Transit Center	↔	Kel-Lac Transit Center	Ingram T/C; Westlakes; Kel-Lac T/C		
615	Standard Service						
615	Kel-Lac / Heritage Park	Raven Field & Pue Rd.	↔	Kel-Lac Transit Center	Heritage Park; Kel-Lac T/C	616	
616	Standard Service						
616	Sky Harbor / Kel-Lac	Old Sky Harbour & Clipper	↔	Kel-Lac Transit Center	Sky Harbor; Kel-Lac T/C; Trader's Village	615	Buses travel to Trader's Village on weekends only
618	Standard Service						
618	Ingram / Westover Hills / Kel-Lac	Horal & Marbach	↔	Ingram Transit Center	Ingram T/C; Westover Hills; Kel-Lac T/C	609	
619	Standard Service						
619	Kel-Lac / Port San Antonio	Quantum & S.W. Loop 410	↔	Kel-Lac Transit Center	Kel-Lac T/C; University Southwest Family Health Center; St. Philip's College Southwest Campus; Port San Antonio		
620	Standard Service						
620	Northwest Vista College / Ingram	Northwest Vista College	↔	Ingram Transit Center	Northwest Vista College; Ingram T/C		
632	Standard Service						
632	Randolph / Ventura	Randolph Blvd. Park & Ride	↔	FM 78 & Crestway	Ventura; Randolph T/C		
647	Standard Service						
647	North Star / Harry Wurzbach	Harry Wurzbach & Terrel	↔	North Star Transit Center	North Star Transit Center; Alamo Heights; Terrell Hills; JBSA-Ft. Sam Houston	648	
648	Standard Service						
648	North Star / Stone Oak	North Central Baptist Hospital	↔	North Star Transit Center	North Star T/C; Arion Business Park; North Central Baptist Hospital	647	
649	Standard Service						
649	North Star / N. Blanco Rd. / Stone Oak	Stone Oak Park & Ride	↔	North Star Transit Center	North Star T/C; Stone Oak P/R	502	
651	Standard Service						
651	Deco District / Castle Hills	West Ave. & Jackson-Keller	↔	West Ave. & Hildebrand	Castle Hills; Deco District		

== Bus fleet ==
=== Active fleet ===
Manufacturer/Model	Year	Fleet Series	Fuel Propulsion	Length	Engine	Transmission	Notes
Gillig Low Floor	2022–2023	758–785	CNG	40 feet (12 m)	Cummins Westport L9N	Voith D864.6	First Gillig buses for VIA; First buses in the fleet to include USB charging ports underneath the seats
Gillig Low Floor	2022–2023	807–820	CNG	40 feet (12 m)	Cummins Westport L9N	Voith D867.8	First Gillig buses for VIA; First buses in the fleet to include USB charging ports underneath the seats
Gillig Low Floor Plus	2022	118–125	Battery Electric	40 feet (12 m)			
NABI 60-BRT	2012–2013	951–969	CNG	60 feet (18 m)	Cummins Westport ISL G	Allison B500R	Used on Prímo routes 100 and 102.
New Flyer Xcelsior XN40	2016	406–420	CNG	40 feet (12 m)	Cummins Westport ISL G	Allison B400R	Previously used exclusively on VIA's now defunct VIVA service. Units since repainted for use on express and crosstown services.
New Flyer Xcelsior XN60	2025-2026	927-945	CNG	60 feet (18 m)	Cummins Westport L9N	Allison B500R	Most units are 3-door models painted in the Prímo livery for use on Routes 100 and 102. Some units are 5-door models painted in the standard livery that are currently still not in service.
Nova Bus LFS Natural Gas	2016–2017	421–691	CNG	40 feet (12 m)	Cummins Westport ISL G	Voith D864.6	801-806 and 970-989 have LFX features.
Nova Bus LFS Natural Gas	2018	692–735	CNG	40 feet (12 m)	Cummins Westport L9N	Voith D864.6	801-806 and 970-989 have LFX features.
Nova Bus LFS Natural Gas	2020	736–757	CNG	40 feet (12 m)	Cummins Westport L9N	Voith D864.6	801-806 and 970-989 have LFX features.
Nova Bus LFS Natural Gas	2020	801–806	CNG	40 feet (12 m)	Cummins Westport L9N	Voith D864.6	801-806 and 970-989 have LFX features.
Nova Bus LFS Natural Gas	2018	970–987	CNG	40 feet (12 m)	Cummins Westport L9N	Voith D864.6	Used on Prímo routes.
Nova Bus LFS Natural Gas	2020	988–989	CNG	40 feet (12 m)	Cummins Westport L9N	Voith D864.6	Used on Prímo routes.

=== Historical fleet ===
Manufacturer/Model	Year	Fleet Series	Fuel Propulsion	Length (ft.)	Notes
Champion Solo	2000	663–729	Propane	30 feet (9.1 m)	Retired from service in 2008.
NABI 40-LFW	1999–2001	730–946	Diesel	40 feet (12 m)	Retired from service in 2017-2018.
NABI 40-LFW	2010	947–950	CNG	40 feet (12 m)	Retired and listed for auction in 2025.
New Flyer D40LF	2003–2006, 2008	200–375	Diesel	40 feet (12 m)	Earlier model years retired from service in 2017, remaining fleet retired from service in 2022.
New Flyer DE40LFR	2010	376–405	Diesel-Hybrid	40 feet (12 m)	Retired from service in 2023.
Optima Trolley Replica	2005	96–114	Propane	30 feet (9.1 m)	Retired from service in 2021.
Proterra BE35 EcoRide	2012	115–117	Electric	35 feet (11 m)	Retired from service in 2022.
