= List of bus rapid transit systems in North America =

North American BRT systems by country

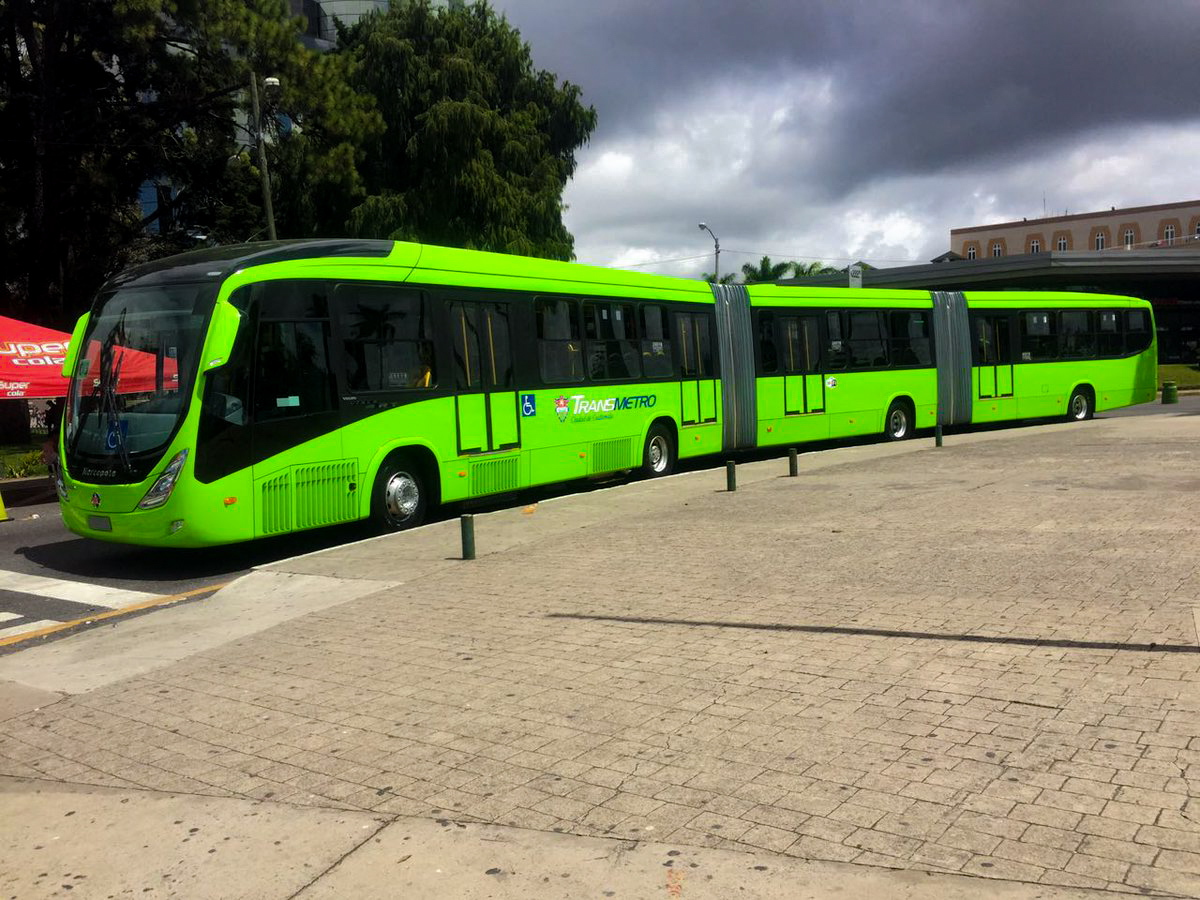
Transmetro in Guatemala City

Bus rapid transit (BRT) systems are designed to have much more capacity, reliability, and other quality features than a conventional bus system. There are a number of BRT systems in North America, with some of their technical details listed below.

The tables below are incomplete. Mouse-over column titles to see expansions of the abbreviations, or see the notes below.

^{1} Ded.: Dedicated right-of-way
^{2} Excl. hwy: Exclusive highway lanes
^{3} Excl. street: Exclusive on-street lanes
^{4} Excl. part: Part-time exclusive lanes
^{5} Bypass: No exclusive lanes but heavy intersection bypass lanes, such as queue jumps
^{6} Shoulder: Buses can use bus bypass shoulders in congestion
^{7} HOV: High-occupancy vehicle (carpool) lanes can be used
^{8} Ltd. stop: System includes limited stop/express routes (includes conventional bus lines)
^{9} Pre-pay: Payment is made before boarding

== Canada ==
Province	City/ region	System/ route	Right-of-way				Priority movement		Stations		Notes
Province	City/ region	System/ route	Busway	Highway lanes	Street lanes	Bypass	Limited stops	Traffic signal priority	Enhanced stations	Pre-payment	Notes
Alberta	Calgary	MAX	Yes	Yes					variable		
British Columbia	Kelowna	97X Kelowna RapidBus				Yes	Yes	Yes	variable		
British Columbia	Victoria	Blink RapidBus			Yes		Yes	Yes	Yes		
British Columbia	Vancouver	RapidBus					Yes	bus signals	Yes		
Manitoba	Winnipeg	Winnipeg RT	Yes								
Nova Scotia	Halifax	MetroLink									Not BRT Certified
Ontario	Brampton	Züm		See note		Yes	Yes		variable		Five routes. Median busways and stations owned by Viva Rapid Transit
Ontario	Durham	Durham Region Transit#DRT Pulse and Rapid Transit			Yes			Yes			
Ontario	London (opens 2027-2028)	LTC Rapid Transit		Yes	Yes		Yes	Yes	Yes		
Ontario	Mississauga	Mississauga Transitway	Yes	HOV, shoulder lanes			Yes		Yes		
Ontario	Ottawa	Transitway (Ottawa)	Yes	Yes			Yes	Yes	Yes	Yes	
Ontario	Kitchener-Waterloo	Grand River Transit ION Bus		Shoulder lanes		Yes	Yes	Yes	Yes		
Ontario	Kitchener-Waterloo	Grand River Transit#iXpress				Yes	Yes	Yes	Yes		
Ontario	York Region	Viva Rapid Transit	Yes	Yes			Yes	bus signals	Yes		
Québec	Gatineau	Rapibus	Yes				Yes	bus signals	variable		
Québec	Laval	Société de transport de Laval		Yes			Yes	bus signals	Yes		
Québec	Longueuil	Réseau de transport de Longueuil			timed lanes		Yes	Yes			
Québec	Montreal	Pie-IX BRT		Yes			Yes	bus signals	Yes	Yes	
Québec	Québec City	Métrobus									Not BRT Certified
Saskatchewan	Saskatoon	Link									

== Guatemala ==
Department	City/ region	System/ route	Rights-of-way				Priority movement		Stations		Notes
Department	City/ region	System/ route	Busway	Highway lanes	Street lanes	Bypass	Limited stops	Traffic signal priority	Enhanced stations	Pre-pay	Notes
Guatemala	Guatemala City	Transmetro									

== Martinique ==
City/ region	System/ route	Rights-of-way				Priority movement		Stations		Notes
City/ region	System/ route	Busway	Highway lanes	Street lanes	Bypass	Limited stops	Traffic signal priority	Enhanced stations	Pre-pay	Notes
Fort-de-France	TCSP									Not BRT certified

== Mexico ==
State	City/ region	System/ route	Rights-of-way				Priority movement		Stations		Notes
State	City/ region	System/ route	Busway	Highway lanes	Street lanes	Bypass	Limited stops	Traffic signal priority	Enhanced stations	Pre- pay	Notes
Baja California	Tijuana	Sistema Integral de Transporte de Tijuana (SITT)			Yes						
Chihuahua	Ciudad Juárez	BravoBús			Yes					Yes	
Chihuahua	Chihuahua City	Bowí			Yes					Yes	
Guanajuato	León	Optibús			Yes		Yes			Yes	
Jalisco	Guadalajara	Mi Macro			Yes					Yes	two-part Phase I under construction; Phase II planned
Guerrero	Acapulco	Acabús			Yes					Yes	
Hidalgo	Pachuca	Tuzobús			Yes					Yes	
Mexico City	Mexico City	Metrobús			Yes					Yes	two-part Phase I under construction; Phase II planned
Nuevo León	Monterrey	Ecovía and TransMetro(es)			Yes					Yes	two-part Phase I under construction; Phase II planned
Oaxaca	Oaxaca City	Citybús			Yes					Yes	
Puebla	Puebla City	Red Urbana de Transporte Articulado (RUTA)			Yes					Yes	two-part Phase I under construction
Querétaro	Querétaro City	Qrobús			Yes					Yes	
State of Mexico	State of Mexico	Mexibús			Yes					Yes	
Yucatán	Mérida	IE-TRAM			Yes						

== United States ==
State	City/ region	System/ route	Rights-of-way				Priority movement		Stations		Notes
State	City/ region	System/ route	Busway	Highway lanes	Street lanes	Bypass	Limited stops	Traffic signal priority	Enhanced stations	Pre-pay	Notes
Alabama	Birmingham	Birmingham Xpress			Yes	Yes		Yes	Yes	Only In-Town-Transit section has exclusive lanses.	
California	East San Francisco Bay	AC Transit Rapid Bus 72R				Yes	Yes	Yes			
California	Los Angeles	Los Angeles Metro G Line	Yes					Yes		Yes	
California	Los Angeles	Los Angeles Metro J Line/ El Monte Busway	Yes	HOV lane			Yes				
California	Los Angeles	Los Angeles Metro J Line/ Harbor Transitway		HOV lane	Yes		Yes				
California	Los Angeles	Los Angeles Metro Rapid			partial		Yes	Yes			Only exclusive lanes on a 1.5-mile (2.4 km) section of Wilshire Boulevard in West Los Angeles.
California	North San Francisco Bay	Golden Gate Transit Route 101		HOV lane			Yes				
California	Oakland/ San Leandro	Tempo					Yes	Yes			
California	San Bernardino	sbX Green Line			partial		Yes	Yes		Yes	Dedicated lanes from Baseline to Hospitality Lane.
California	San Diego	Rapid	Yes								
California	San Francisco	Geary BRT, Van Ness BRT			Yes		Yes	Yes			
California	San Jose	VTA: Rapid 522				Yes	Yes	partial			Signal priority along El Camino Real.
California	Stockton	San Joaquin Regional Transit District BRT Express					Yes	Yes		Yes	
California	Tri-Valley	Wheels routes 10R and 30R			partial	Yes	Yes	Yes		Yes	
Colorado	Boulder/ Denver	Flatiron Flyer		HOV/ shoulder lanes		Yes					Contested as being bus rapid transit.
Colorado	Boulder	CO-7 BRT (opens 2027)									
Colorado	Boulder/ Longmont	Diagonal Flyer (opens 2027)									
Colorado	Denver	LYNX (opens 2027)			partial		Yes	Yes		Yes	No exclusive lanes in Aurora.
Colorado	Fort Collins	MAX	Yes		partial	Yes	Yes	Yes		Yes	
Colorado	Roaring Fork Valley	VelociRFTA		Yes	Yes	Yes	Yes	Yes		partial	Ticket vending machines are not available at all stations.
Connecticut	Hartford	CT Fastrak	Yes				Yes	Yes		Yes	
Florida	Jacksonville	First Coast Flyer			partial	Yes	Yes	Yes		partial	Ticket vending machines are not available at all stations.
Florida	Miami	South Dade TransitWay	Yes		partial	Yes	Yes	Yes			
Florida	Orlando	LYMMO	Yes		Yes		Yes	Yes		Yes	
Florida	Saint Petersburg	PSTA SunRunner			partial	Yes	Yes	Yes			
Georgia	Atlanta	Rapid A Line			Yes			Yes		Yes	
Illinois	Chicago	Jeffery Jump/ J14 bus			partial		Yes	Yes			Only has exclusive lanes in the Loop, which are shared with the Loop Link below
Illinois	Chicago	Loop Link		Yes			Yes	Yes			
Illinois	Chicago	McCormick Place Busway	Yes				Yes			Yes	
Illinois	Chicago area	PACE Pulse					Yes	Yes			
Illinois	Elgin	PACE I-90 Express		Yes			Yes				
Indiana	Gary	Broadway Metro Express			Yes	Yes	Yes				
Indiana	Indianapolis	IndyGo			Yes		Yes	Yes		Yes	
Kentucky	Louisville	Dixie Rapid					Yes	Yes			
Louisiana	Baton Rouge	BRapid/MoveBR (under construction)									
Louisiana	New Orleans	East-Westbank BRT (expected 2029)									
Maryland	Montgomery County	Flash					Yes	Yes		Yes	
Massachusetts	Boston	Silver Line	partial		partial		Yes	variable		variable	
Michigan	Grand Rapids	The Rapid			partial		Yes	Yes		Yes	
Minnesota	Rochester	Link									
Minnesota	Twin Cities	University of Minnesota Campus Shuttle	Yes				Yes	variable		free	
Minnesota	Twin Cities	color lines		HOV, shoulder lanes	Yes	Yes	Yes	Yes		Yes	Includes Metro Transit Metro Bronze, Gold, Orange, and Red lines
Minnesota	Twin Cities	letter lines		HOV, shoulder lanes	partial		Yes	Yes		Yes	Includes the Metro Transit Metro A-J lines
Missouri	Kansas City	Metro Area Express/ MAX			partial		Yes	Yes			
Nebraska	Omaha	Omaha Rapid Bus Transit			partial		Yes	Yes			
Nevada	Las Vegas	RTC Transit RED line					Yes	green lights extended			
Nevada	Reno	RAPID			partial		Yes	Yes			
New Jersey	Route 9	Route 9 BBS		shoulder lanes	partial		Yes			variable	
New Mexico	Albuquerque	Albuquerque Rapid Transit		Yes			Yes	Yes		Yes	
New York	Albany	CDTA BusPlus	Yes				Yes	Yes			Dedicate busway use varies depending on route
New York	New York City	Select Bus Service			partial		Yes	Yes		Yes	
New York	Westchester County	Hudson Link			only over the Tappan Zee Bridge		Yes				
North Carolina	Raleigh	Wake Bus Rapid Transit (opens 2028)									
Ohio	Cincinnati	Southwest Ohio Regional Transit Authority Metro*PLUS					Yes		Yes		
Ohio	Columbus	CMAX			partial		Yes	rush-hour	Yes		
Ohio	Cleveland	HealthLine			majority		Yes			Yes	
Oklahoma	Oklahoma City	Embark Rapid					Yes	Yes		Yes	
Oklahoma	Tulsa	Aero					Yes	Yes			
Oregon	Eugene	Emerald Express	Yes		Yes		Yes	Yes			
Oregon	Portland	Frequent Express/ FX			partial			Yes			
Pennsylvania	Delaware County	Ardmore Busway	Yes								former trolley line
Pennsylvania	Pittsburgh	Pittsburgh Regional Transit busways (East, South, West)	Yes								
Rhode Island	Providence	R-Line				Yes	Yes	Yes			
Rhode Island	Providence	East Side Bus Tunnel	Yes								Converted trolley tunnel, used solely by four bus lines and one rubber-tired "trolley" line
Texas	Austin	CapMetro Rapid			only in Downtown Austin		Yes	Yes		Yes	
Texas	Dallas	DART		HOV, shoulder lanes			Yes				
Texas	El Paso	Sun Metro Brio			partial		Yes	Yes		Yes	
Texas	Houston	(HOV system)		HOV			Yes		Yes		Reversible HOV lanes in 6 corridors with direct ramps to park-and-ride lots, transit centers and downtown streets. Uses a frequent express bus service with dedicated fleet.
Texas	Houston	METRORapid Silver Line			Yes		Yes		Yes	Yes	
Texas	San Antonio	VIA Primo					Yes		Yes	Yes	
Utah	Ogden	UTA Ogden Express			only through Weber State University		Yes	Yes		free until April 2028	
Utah	Provo-Orem	UTA Utah Valley Express			Yes		Yes	Yes		Yes	
Utah	Salt Lake County	UTA Midvalley Express			Yes	Yes	Yes	Yes		free until 2029	
Virginia	Alexandria	Metroway	Yes		Yes		Yes	Yes			
Virginia	Richmond	GRTC Pulse	Yes	shoulder lanes	Yes		Yes			Yes	
Washington	King County	RapidRide		HOV, shoulder lanes		Yes	Yes	Yes		variable	
Washington	Seattle	SODO Busway	Yes								1.5-mile surface busway connecting in from the south to Downtown Seattle Transit Tunnel
Washington	Seattle	Sound Transit Express		Yes							
Washington	Snohomish County	Swift		HOV, shoulder lanes			Yes	Yes		Yes	
Washington	Spokane	City Line						Yes		Yes	
Washington	Vancouver	The Vine					Yes	Yes		Yes	
Wisconsin	Madison	Metro Rapid			partial			Yes		Yes	
Wisconsin	Milwaukee	MCTS Connect			partial			Yes		Yes	
