= Texas State Highway Spur 345 =

State highway in Texas

State Highway Spur 345
- Fredericksburg Road
- Spur 345 highlighted in red

Route information
- Maintained by TxDOT
- Length: 5.101 mi (8.209 km)
- Existed: January 26, 1962 (as Loop 345)–present

Major junctions
- South end: Balcones Heights city limits
- North end: I-10 / US 87 in San Antonio

Location
- Country: United States
- State: Texas
- Counties: Bexar

Highway system
- Highways in Texas; Interstate; US; State; Former; Toll; Loops; Spurs; FM/RM; Park; Rec
| ← Loop 344 | → Loop 346 |

Spur 345 is a 5.1-mile-long (8.2 km) route in Greater San Antonio in the U.S. state of Texas, maintained by the Texas Department of Transportation (TxDOT). It follows a former route of U.S. Route 87 (US 87) through Balcones Heights and northwest San Antonio. Known locally as Fredericksburg Road, it is a major arterial for the cities of San Antonio and Balcones Heights, providing access to the headquarters of United Services Automobile Association (USAA) and to the South Texas Medical Center.

== Route description ==
Spur 345 follows Fredericksburg Road from the southern city limits of Balcones Heights. It crosses through that city, providing access to the Wonderland of the Americas shopping center, before crossing into San Antonio and intersecting Interstate 410 (I-410, Connally Loop). It continues north through the South Texas Medical Center, crossing Wurzbach Road (which becomes Wurzbach Parkway further east), before ending at I-10/US 87 (McDermott Freeway) on the northwest side of the city.

== History ==
Spur 345 follows the original routing of US 87 on the northwest side of San Antonio. The road was designated as US 87 along this stretch in 1935. It is named Fredericksburg Road because this road was, at that time, the main route to Fredericksburg, about 65 miles (105 km) north of San Antonio. On January 26, 1962, when US 87 was rerouted onto the I-10 freeway to the east, the section of Fredericksburg Road was kept on the state highway system as Loop 345.

It was signed as a business route of US 87 until 1990.

On December 18, 2014, the section from I-410 south to I-10 was removed from the state highway system, while the remaining segment was redesignated Spur 345 as part of TxDOT's San Antonio turnback program, which returned 21.8 miles (35.1 km) of roadways to the city.

== Junction list ==
The entire route is in Bexar County.

| Location | mi | km | Destinations | Notes |
|---|---|---|---|---|
| Balcones Heights | 0.0 | 0.0 | Balcones Heights Rd. | Southern terminus; continues as Fredericksburg Rd. under local jurisdiction |
| San Antonio | 0.9 | 1.4 | I-410 (Connally Loop) – San Antonio International Airport | I-410 exit 15 |
| San Antonio | 5.1 | 8.2 | I-10 / US 87 (McDermott Freeway) | Northern terminus; I-10 exit 560A; southbound exit and northbound entrance |
1.000 mi = 1.609 km; 1.000 km = 0.621 mi: Incomplete access
