= NaviLens =

Color matrix barcode

Classification
- Type: Proprietary scannable code

NaviLens is a color matrix barcode intended to help blind and visually impaired people find their way around railway and subway stations, museums, libraries, and other public spaces.

The color matrix code, a tag similar to a simplified QR code, uses differentiated colours on a deep black background surrounded by a white frame. An app on a smartphone can recognise this without deliberate framing and selection. The app reads the tag and provides information about the detected tag's location relative to the user (distance, angle) and about the target to be reached. This could be public transportation schedules, potential physical obstacles, or physical descriptions of the environment. Users can also download tags, print them, and customize their meaning to label food boxes or personal documents.

Navilens was developed by the Laboratorio de Investigación en Visión Móvil (Mobile Vision Research Laboratory) at the University of Alicante, in collaboration with the Spanish startup NaviLens.

Navilens is proprietary software; intellectual property and licensing rights are held by NaviLens' parent company Neosistec. Public use of the codes requires paying a license fee to Neostatic; personal use in the home or other private sphere is currently automatically licensed free of charge.

The food product company Kellogg's has obtained a license to put codes on several of their products.

== Examples ==
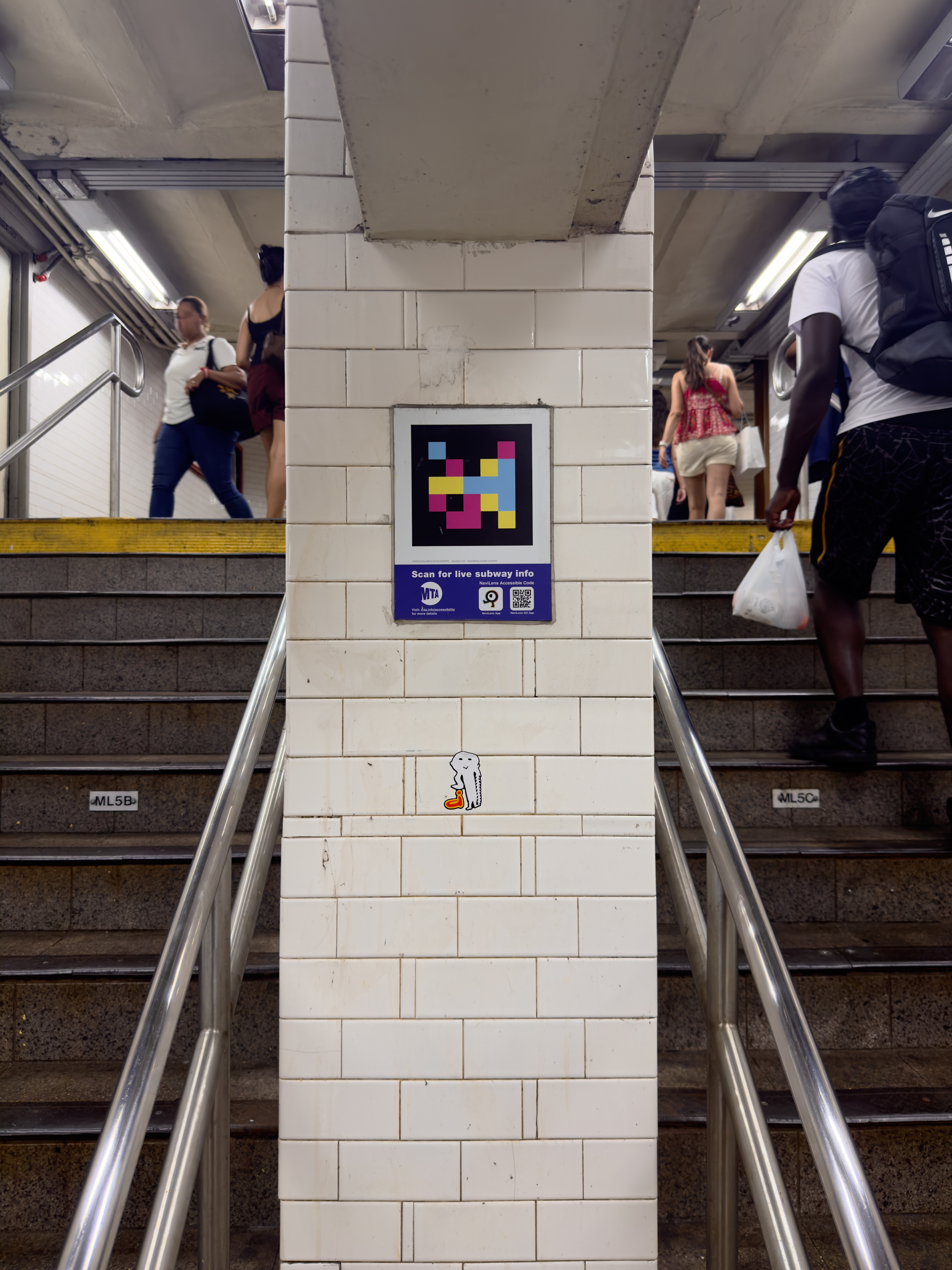
Navilens deployed in the New York City Subway System.

- Barcelona's TMB bus and metro systems
- Some Belgian SNCB railway stations
- Melbourne's Yarra Trams stops and rolling stock
- New York City's Subway stations
- San Antonio's VIA bus stops
- Singapore's SMRT Buses interchanges
- Boston's North Station
