= Wonderland of the Americas =

Coordinates: 29°29′34″N 98°33′04″W

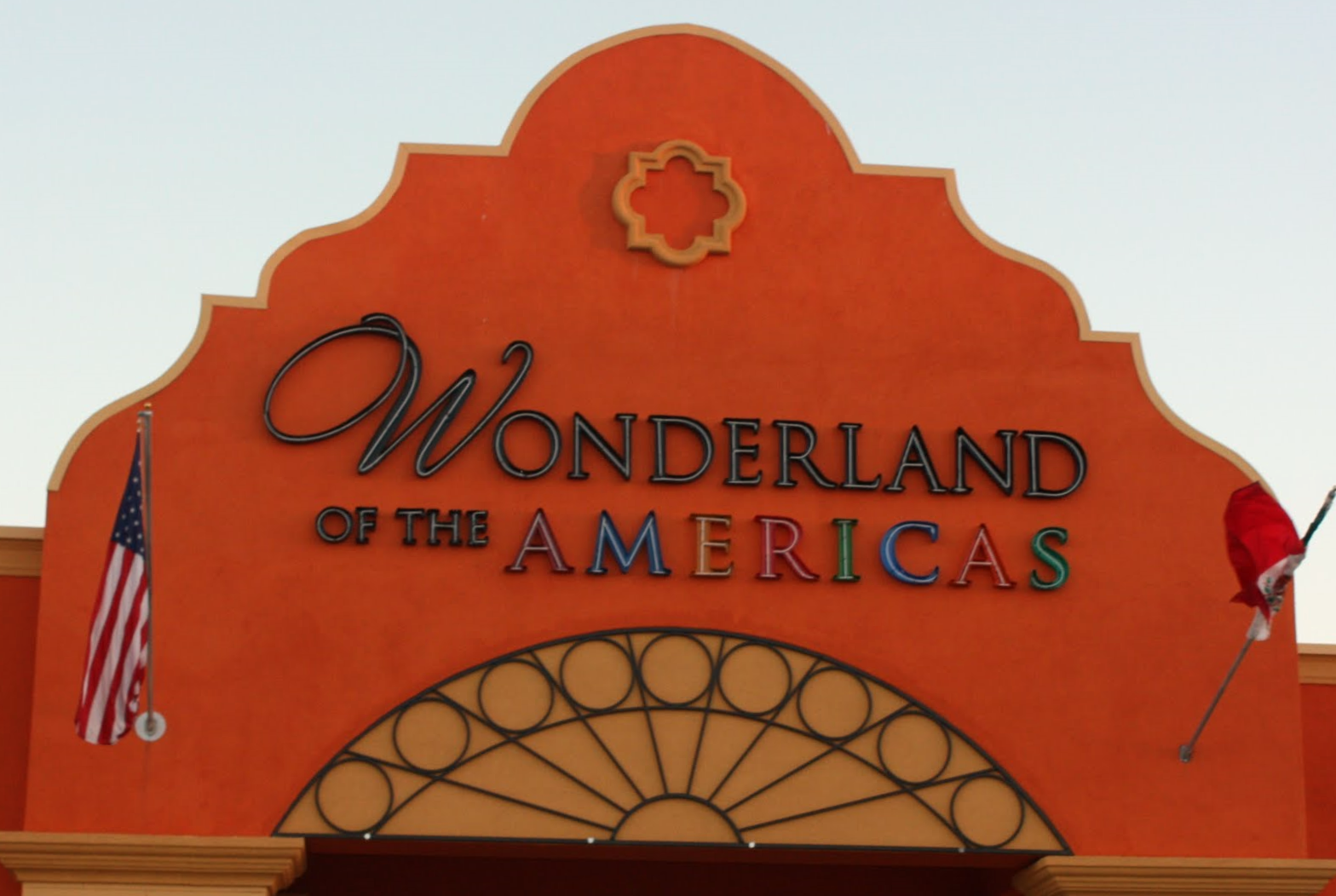
- Location: San Antonio, Texas, USA
- Opened: September 14, 1961
- Owner: Crossroads Mall Partners Ltd.
- Num. of stores: 45
- Num. of anchor tenants: 6
- Floor area: 565,718 square feet (52,556.9 m^{2})
- Floors: 2
- Website: Wonderland Mall

Wonderland of the Americas, formerly known as Crossroads Mall, is a 565,718-square-foot regional shopping mall located in Balcones Heights, Texas, a suburb of San Antonio. The mall is currently anchored by Super Target, Burlington Coat Factory, Hobby Lobby, Ross, WSS, and Five Below. Excluding the six anchors, there are 45 tenants in the mall, including shops, restaurants, and offices.

== History ==
The mall, originally known as Wonderland Shopping City, was constructed on a 61-acre plot in Balcones Heights, Texas, an enclave city surrounded by San Antonio. At the time of its opening in 1961, the mall boasted 650,000 square feet of air-conditioned shopping area, 62 stores, and two anchors, a 2-level Montgomery Ward in a 149,000 square foot store and a 66,000 square foot Handy Andy supermarket. The Handy Andy was constructed prior to the rest of the mall, opening in May 1959, with John Wayne participating in a ribbon-cutting ceremony for the new store. Besides the two anchors, the mall also included a Woolworth's five-and-dime store, a Kinney Shoes outlet, a Zales Jewelers store, a Sinclair service station, and 5,000 parking spots. At the time of its opening, the mall employed segregated facilities, with "Whites Only" and "Coloreds Only" restrooms and water fountains.

Soon after the opening, the mall began to expand. In 1963, construction began on a 155,800 square foot Rhodes Brothers department store, which opened the next year. This was soon followed by the construction of the Wonder Theater, which showed its first film in November 1966. Several years after purchasing Rhodes, in August 1977, Liberty House took over the Rhodes department store location. Liberty House didn't succeed in the location, however, and closed in 1980. Their anchor location was, in turn, rebranded as a Frost Brothers in the same year. Small scale renovations also commenced in 1980, providing the mall with a facelift on the exterior and interior.

Following a large-scale renovation between Spring 1986 and November 1987, the mall was renamed Crossroads Mall of San Antonio. With the renovations came the addition of a new retail wing and anchor, Stein Mart. The renovations also added new tile flooring, lighting, graphics and skylights to the mall, along with the construction of a parking garage. The renovations, however, would not boost the fortunes of the mall. Frost Brothers filed for bankruptcy in 1988, closing its anchor store the next year. By 1990, the mall was almost half vacant.

With its decline in fortunes, the mall rebranded itself from a luxury shopping center to one serving value-oriented consumers. The former Frost Brothers anchor location was replaced by a Burlington Coat Factory in 1991. Hobby Lobby took over the former Handy Andy location in 1994. In 2002, much of the former Montgomery Ward's location was demolished. The site was replaced by the Norris Convention Center, opening in November 2004 and a Super Target, opening in March 2003. The 6-screen theater at the mall also underwent renovations in 2003, becoming a dine-in theater operated by Santikos Theatres.

The mall underwent a change of ownership in 2009, with a consortium of San Antonio investors purchasing the property. This group initiated a 10 million dollar renovation project in 2010, commencing with the renaming of the shopping center to Wonderland of the Americas.

== Anchors ==
- Super Target (1 Floor) (Formerly Montgomery Ward 1961-2001) (Target 2003-Present)
- Hobby Lobby (1 Floor) (Formerly Handy Andy 1960-1994) (Hobby Lobby 1994-Present)
- Burlington Coat Factory (2 Floors - 1st Floor Garage) (Formerly Frost Brothers 1980-1991) (Burlington 1991-Present)
- WSS & Five Below (1 Floor) (Formerly Stein Mart 1987-2019) (WSS 2024-2026) (Five Below 2024-Present)
- Wonder Theatre (1 Floor) (Formerly Santikos Bijou Theater 1987-2020) (Wonder Theatre 2021-Present)
