= Dixie Rapid =

Bus rapid transit service in Louisville, Kentucky, United States

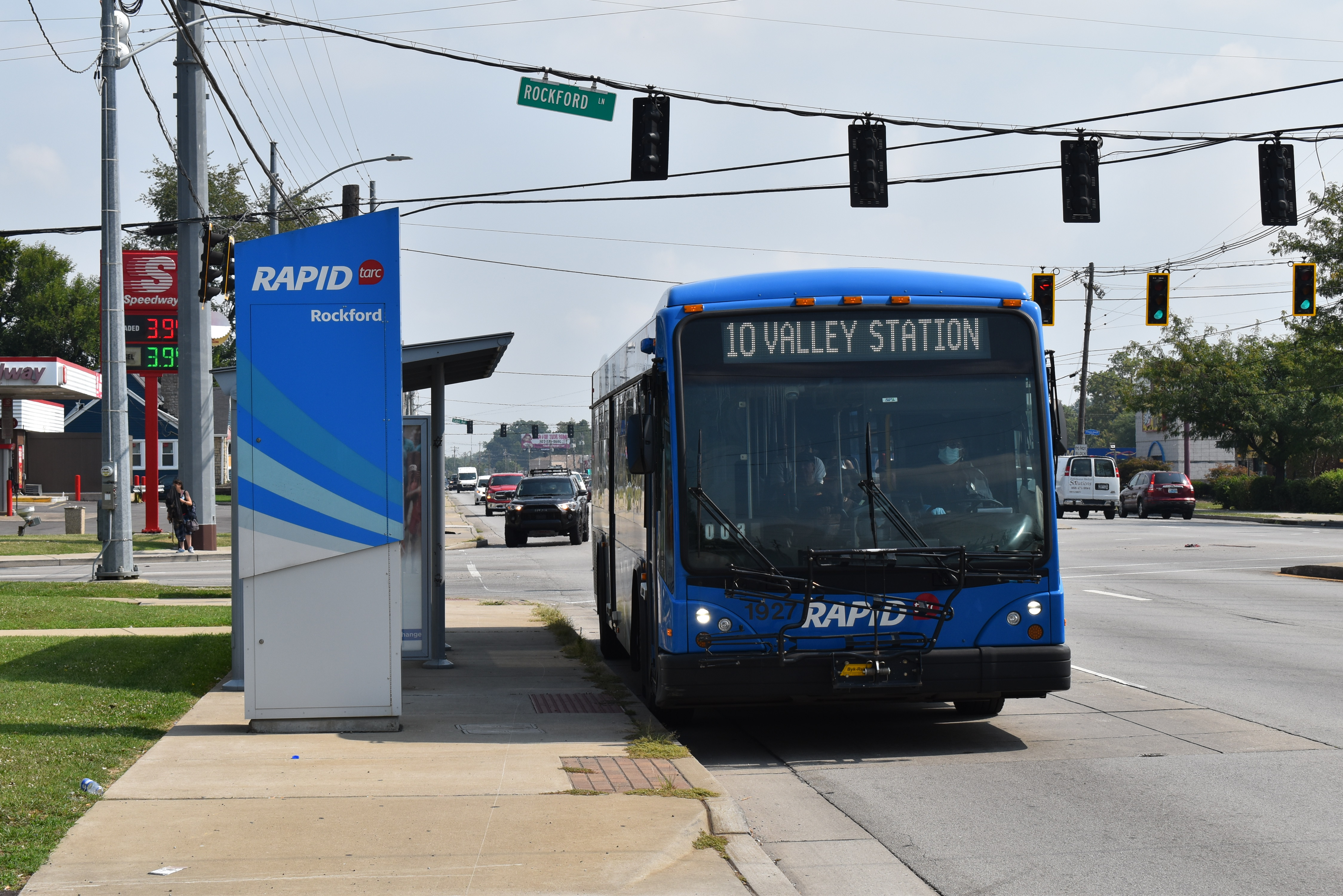
- A TARC Route 10 Dixie Rapid bus at the Rockford station

Overview
- System: TARC
- Vehicle: Gillig Low Floor
- Began service: January 6, 2020

Route
- Locale: Louisville, Kentucky
- Start: 2nd & Market (Downtown Louisville)
- End: Dixie Gardens (Valley Station); Rockford Lane & Cane Run Road
- Length: 14 miles (23 km) (Valley Station branch); 9.9 miles (15.9 km) (Rockford Lane branch)
- Stations: 18

Service
- Frequency: Peak: 15 minutes (north of Rockford Lane); Off-peak: 30 minutes (north of Rockford Lane)
- Weekend frequency: 20 minutes

Dixie Rapid is a bus rapid transit (BRT) service in Louisville, Kentucky, United States. It is operated by TARC and serves a 15 miles (24 km) corridor between Valley Station and downtown Louisville. Construction began in December 2017, with full service beginning in early 2020. The system uses 40-foot (12 m) buses on a route featuring some BRT features, but notably lacking others such as dedicated lanes and off-board fare payment.

== History ==
In 2015, a $16.9 million grant was awarded to Louisville by the USDOT to begin the project by constructing bus shelters and purchasing new buses. A combination of federal, state and local funding was used for the service as part of a larger project to improve safety and accessibility on the Dixie Highway. Groundbreaking occurred in December 2017 and the new route opened on January 6, 2020, largely replacing the Route 18. As of late 2024, TARC had proposed to reduce service to 20 minute headways as a result of inadequate funding. On August 2, 2026, as part of the New TARC Network, a new branch was created along Rockford Lane to Cane Run Road, with buses alternating between both branches.

== Operations ==
=== Stations ===
The route runs north–south through primarily along the Dixie Highway in Louisville. The 37 stations often include benches, shelters and an arrival sign, however not all stations are built to this standard.

=== Headways ===
Time	4A	5A	6A	7A	8A	9A	10A	11A	12P	1P	2P	3P	4P	5P	6P	7P	8P	9P	10P	11P
Weekdays	20		15														20	30		
Weekends	30				20												30			

=== Buses ===
The Dixie Rapid system uses Gillig Low Floor diesel buses equipped with transit signal priority. Eight buses were purchased for the opening, with one more repurposed from the general bus fleet.

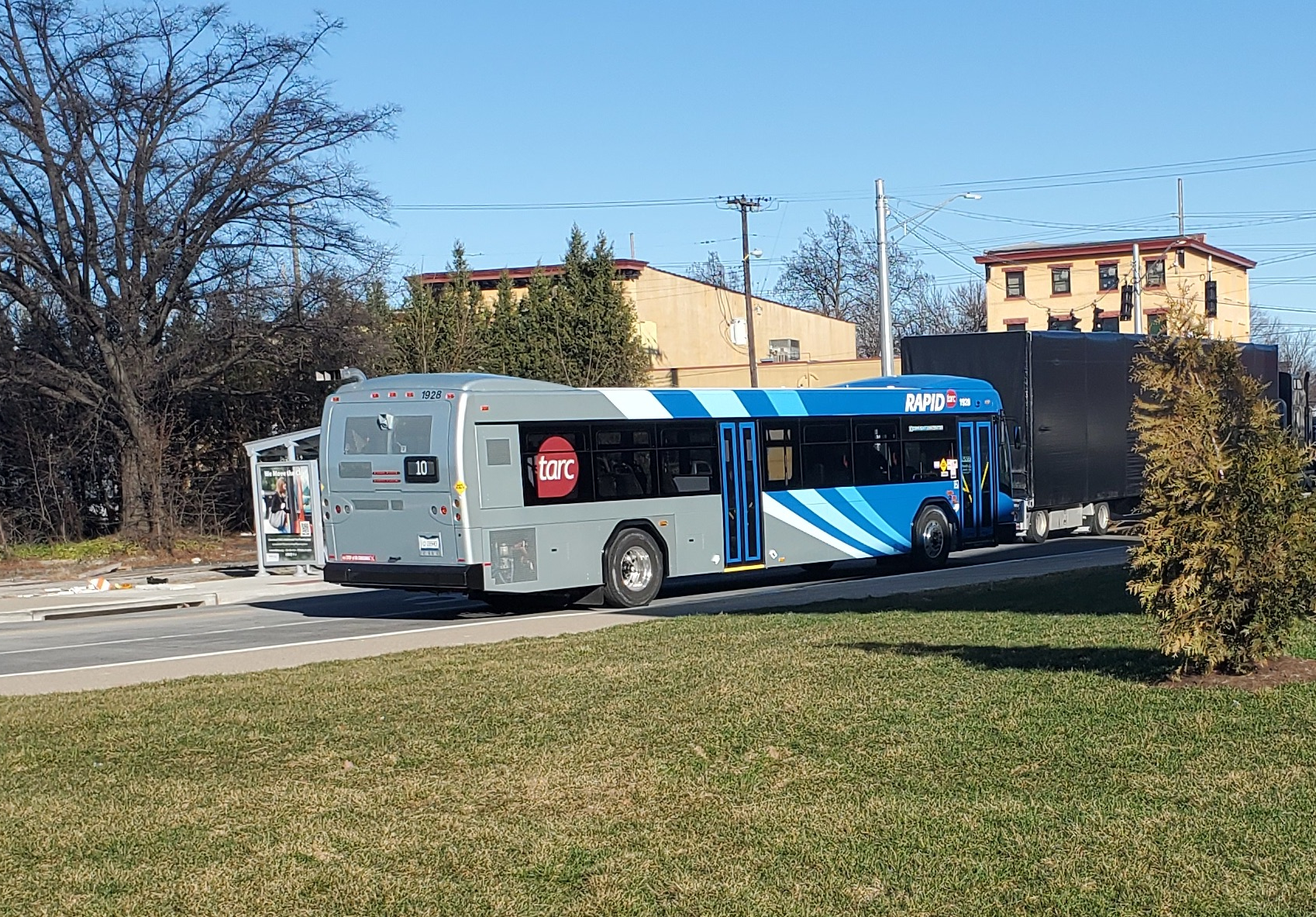
A Dixie Rapid Gillig Low Floor diesel bus
