= Omaha Rapid Bus Transit =

Bus rapid transit service in Omaha, Nebraska

Omaha Rapid Bus Transit (ORBT)

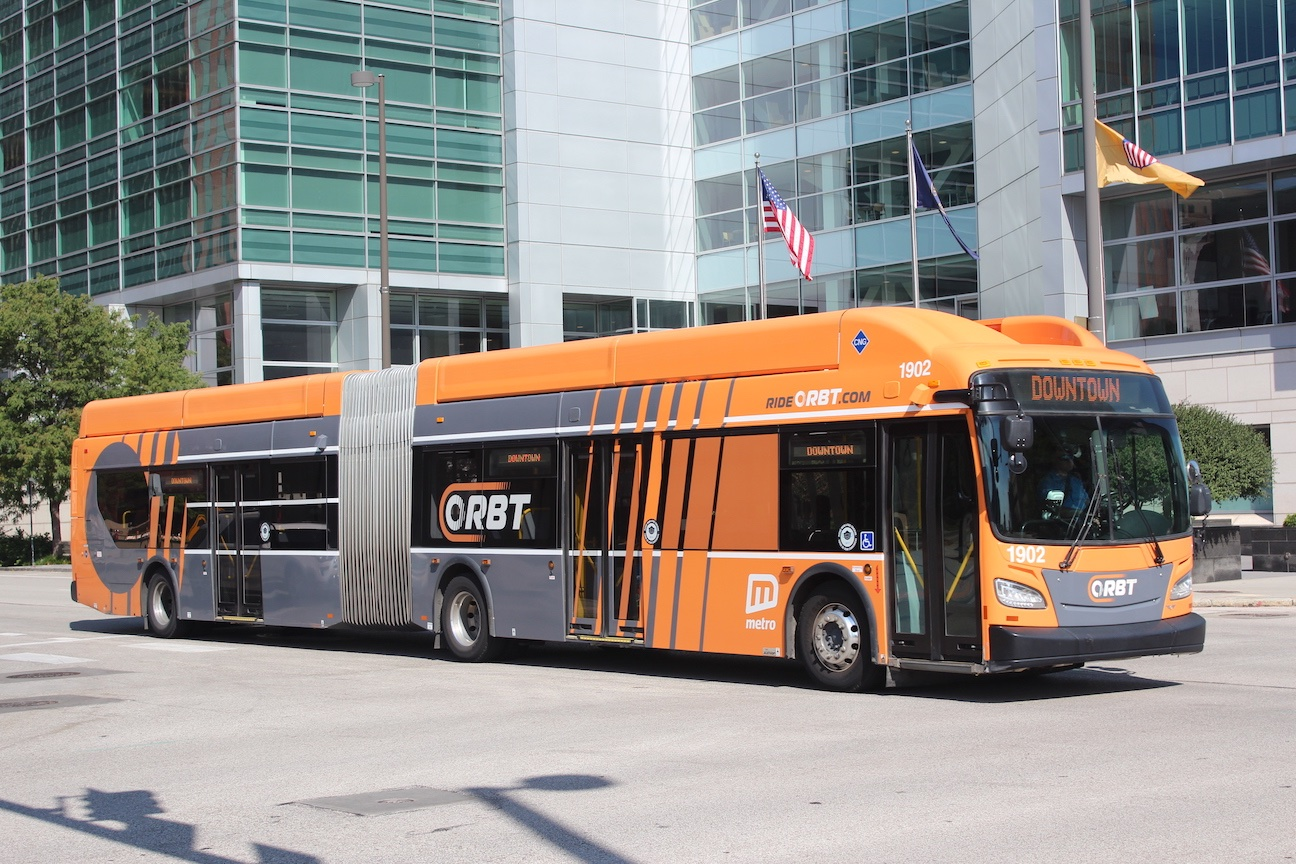

Overview
- System: Metro Transit
- Vehicle: New Flyer XN60
- Began service: November 18, 2020

Route
- Locale: Omaha, Nebraska
- Start: Old Market District
- End: Westroads Transit Center
- Length: 8.2 mi (13.2 km)
- Stations: 23

Service
- Frequency: Peak: 10 minutes Off-peak: 15–20 minutes
- Weekend frequency: 15–20 minutes

Omaha Rapid Bus Transit (ORBT) is a bus rapid transit service in Omaha, Nebraska, United States. It is operated by Metro Transit and serves 8.2 miles (13.2 km) of Dodge Street between Omaha's Old Market entertainment district and the transit center at Westroads Mall. Construction began in late 2018, with full service beginning in the fall of 2020. The system uses 60-foot (18 m) articulated buses powered by compressed natural gas. The route features dedicated lanes, signal priority for ORBT vehicles, and a park and ride lot at Westroads Mall.

== History ==
Planning for a bus rapid transit system in Omaha was listed as a priority by Regional Transit Vision as early as 2013. Work began after a $15 million TIGER grant was awarded to Omaha by the Federal Transit Administration. Metro Transit unveiled the ORBT brand in August 2017. Construction commenced in late 2018 and ORBT service began in fall 2020.

At launch, ORBT was free for all riders. However, in September 2021, a contactless payment system was added to the system. In 2024, plans were announced to extend service to Council Bluffs, Iowa.

== Operations ==
=== Stations ===
The route runs east–west along Dodge Street. ORBT's twenty three stops are between four and twelve blocks apart, further apart than most Metro Transit bus routes. Stations include fully covered platforms, with floors of conductive concrete for better grip during winter months. Each Station has a ticketing kiosk, arrival signage, free WiFi, and bike racks. Select Stations also have B-Cycle bicycle sharing.

List of stations
Stops		Notable places nearby and notes
Westbound	Eastbound	Notable places nearby and notes
Westroads Transit Center		Park and ride, Westroads Mall
90th St & Dodge St		
84th St & Dodge St		Children's Hospital & Medical Center
77th St & Dodge St		Keystone Trail
72nd St & Dodge St		
62nd St & Dodge St		University of Nebraska Omaha
49th St & Dodge St		
42nd St & Dodge St		University of Nebraska Medical Center
33rd St & Dodge St		Midtown Crossing
Park Ave & Dodge St	Park Ave & Douglas St	
24th St & Dodge St	24th St & Douglas St	
20th St & Dodge St	19th St & Douglas St	
15th St & Dodge St	15th St & Douglas St	
12th St & Dodge St	10th St & Douglas St	
8th St & Farnam St		Old Market District, Heartland of America Park

=== Headways ===
Time	4:30A	5A	6A	7A	8A	9A	10A	11A	12P	1P	2P	3P	4P	5P	6P	7P	8P	9P	10P	11:30P	Ref.
Weekdays	20	10															15	20			
Saturday	—N/a	20				15										20					
Sunday	—N/a		20				15								20				—N/a		

=== Buses ===
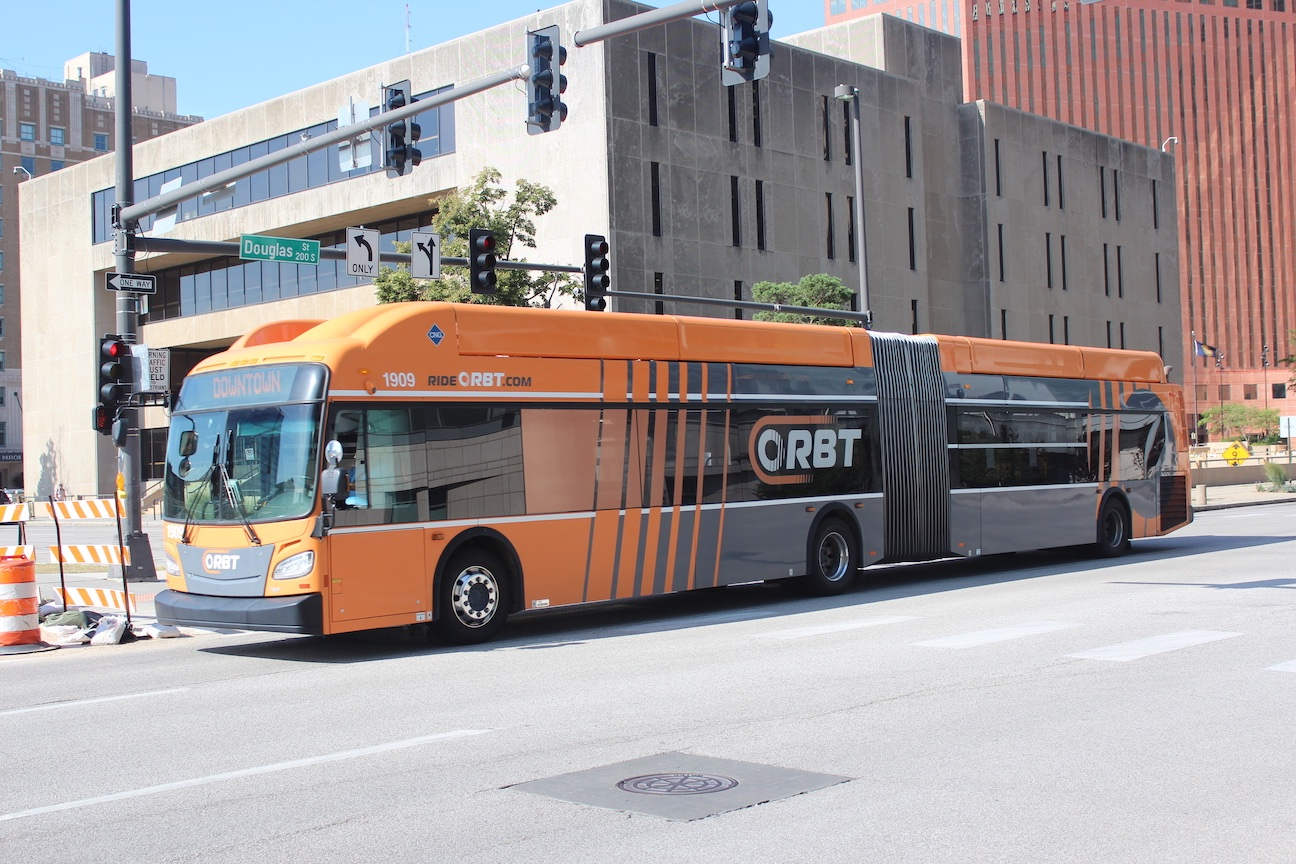
ORBT bus #1909 on Douglas Street.

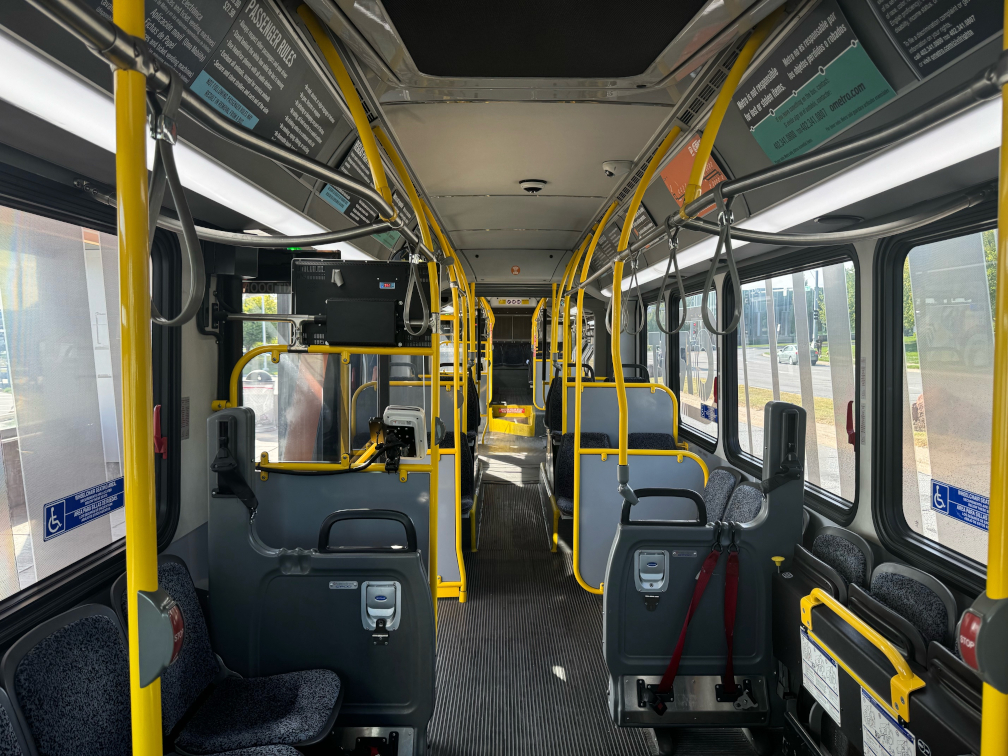
Interior of an ORBT bus.

The ORBT system uses ten 2020 New Flyer XN60 articulated buses powered by compressed natural gas. At 60-foot (18 m) long, buses used on the ORBT line are longer than the typical 30-, 35-, and 40-foot buses operated by Metro Transit. They feature on-board bicycle racks, free Wi-Fi, and accessibility features including level boarding and navigation aids. The first vehicle was displayed to the press in 2017.

== See also ==
- Metro Transit (Omaha)
- Bus Rapid Transit
