= Leon Valley, Texas =

- City
- Location of Leon Valley, Texas
- Coordinates: 29°29′54″N 98°36′45″W
- Country: United States
- State: Texas
- County: Bexar

Government
  - Type: Council-Manager
  - City Council: Mayor Chris Riley; Danielle Bolton; Betty Heyl; Philip Campos; Rey Orozco; Beth Mursch
  - City Manager: Crystal Caldera

Area
  - Total: 3.47 sq mi (8.98 km^{2})
  - Land: 3.47 sq mi (8.98 km^{2})
  - Water: 0 sq mi (0.00 km^{2})
- Elevation: 827 ft (252 m)

Population (2020)
  - Total: 11,542
  - Density: 3,548.9/sq mi (1,370.25/km^{2})
- Time zone: UTC-6 (Central (CST))
  - Summer (DST): UTC-5 (CDT)
- ZIP codes: 78238, 78240, 78268
- Area codes: 210/726
- FIPS code: 48-42388
- GNIS feature ID: 1339825
- Website: leonvalleytexas.gov

Leon Valley is a city in Bexar County, Texas, United States. It is an enclave on the northwestern side of San Antonio and is part of the San Antonio-New Braunfels metropolitan statistical area. Its population was 11,542 at the 2020 census. Leon Valley is an independent municipality surrounded by the city of San Antonio.

== History ==
Leon Valley was developed in the 1940s as a farming community on Bandera Road between Helotes and San Antonio. In 1952, residents filed a petition for incorporation as an independent city, since the residents did not wish to be annexed by San Antonio. Leon Valley incorporated in 1954 under the leadership of its founding mayor, Raymond Rimkus. In 1960, it had a population of 536 and by 1970, its population grew to 1,960. In 1990, it had 9,581 people.

== Geography ==
Leon Valley is located at 29°29′54″N 98°36′45″W (29.498280, −98.612594). This is three miles southwest of the South Texas Medical Center, eight miles west of Uptown San Antonio and 10 miles northwest of downtown San Antonio.

According to the United States Census Bureau, the city has a total area of 3.4 square miles (8.8 km^{2}), all land.

== Climate ==
The climate in Leon Valley is very moderate and subtropical. Summers can be hot reaching temperatures as high as 96°F and in the winter as low as 42°F.

Climate data for Leon Valley, Texas
Month	Jan	Feb	Mar	Apr	May	Jun	Jul	Aug	Sep	Oct	Nov	Dec	Year
Record high °F (°C)	90 (32)	97 (36)	97 (36)	101 (38)	102 (39)	106 (41)	105 (41)	104 (40)	113 (45)	97 (36)	91 (33)	89 (32)	113 (45)
Mean daily maximum °F (°C)	61 (16)	66 (19)	74 (23)	80 (27)	86 (30)	91 (33)	95 (35)	95 (35)	88 (31)	82 (28)	72 (22)	63 (17)	79 (26)
Mean daily minimum °F (°C)	39 (4)	44 (7)	51 (11)	57 (14)	63 (17)	69 (21)	72 (22)	73 (23)	68 (20)	60 (16)	50 (10)	42 (6)	57 (14)
Record low °F (°C)	−1 (−18)	5 (−15)	20 (−7)	32 (0)	48 (9)	48 (9)	62 (17)	46 (8)	40 (4)	29 (−2)	24 (−4)	6 (−14)	−1 (−18)
Average precipitation inches (mm)	1.48 (38)	2.04 (52)	1.92 (49)	2.51 (64)	3.31 (84)	4.77 (121)	1.53 (39)	1.29 (33)	2.54 (65)	3.02 (77)	1.84 (47)	1.38 (35)	27.63 (704)
Average snowfall inches (cm)	0.5 (1.3)	0.5 (1.3)	trace	0 (0)	0 (0)	0 (0)	0 (0)	0 (0)	0 (0)	0 (0)	0 (0)	trace	1 (2.5)

== Demographics ==
Historical population
Census	Pop.	Note	%±
1960	536		—
1970	2,487		364.0%
1980	9,088		265.4%
1990	9,581		5.4%
2000	9,239		−3.6%
2010	10,151		9.9%
2020	11,542		13.7%
U.S. Decennial Census

=== 2020 census ===
As of the 2020 census, 11,542 people, 4,655 households, and 3,036 families were residing in the city.

The median age was 39.5 years; 20.5% of residents were under 18 and 19.5% were 65 or older. For every 100 females, there were 91.5 males, and for every 100 females 18 and over, there were 88.1 males 18 and over.

Of the 4,655 households, 30.1% had children under 18 living in them, 41.5% were married-couple households, 19.0% were households with a male householder and no spouse or partner present, and 32.1% were households with a female householder and no spouse or partner present. About 30.5% of all households were made up of individuals, and 13.6% had someone living alone who was 65 or older.

The city had 5,010 housing units, of which 7.1% were vacant. The homeowner vacancy rate was 0.6% and the rental vacancy rate was 12.6%.

All of the residents lived in urban areas, while 0.0% lived in rural areas.

Racial composition as of the 2020 census
Race	Number	Percentage
White	5,333	46.2%
Black or African American	649	5.6%
American Indian and Alaska Native	118	1.0%
Asian	568	4.9%
Native Hawaiian and other Pacific Islander	12	0.1%
Some other race	1,505	13.0%
Two or more races	3,357	29.1%
Hispanic or Latino (of any race)	6,875	59.6%

=== 2010 census ===
At the 2010 census, 10,151 people, 4,158 households, and 2,636 families were living in the city. The racial makeup of the city was 80.98% White, 3.98% African American, 0.57% Native American, 3.71% Asian, 0.19% Pacific Islander, 8.06% from other races, and 2.51% from two or more races. Hispanic or Latino of any race were 56.22% of the population.

Of the 4,158 households, 24.22% had children under 18 living with them, 45.98% were married couples living together, 12.70% had a female householder with no husband present, and 36.60% were not families. About 29.89% of households were one person and 11.54% were one person 65 or older. The average household size was 2.44, and the average family size was 3.03.

The age distribution was 23.09% under 19, 6.82% from 19 to 24, 27.32% from 25 to 44, 25.85% from 45 to 64, and 16.92% were 65 or older. The median age was 39.4 years. For every 100 females, there were 92.66 males. For every 100 females 18 and over, there were 88.62 males.

=== 2000 census ===
At the 2000 census, 9,239 people, 3,576 households, and 2,521 families lived in the city. The population density was 2,708.0 inhabitants per square mile (1,045.6/km^{2}). The 3,672 housing units hat an average density of 1,076.3 per square mile (415.6/km^{2}). The racial makeup of the city was 78.07% White, 2.77% African American, 0.67% Native American, 1.95% Asian, 0.15% Pacific Islander, 13.19% from other races, and 3.19% from two or more races. Hispanics or Latinos of any race were 44.65%.

Of the 3,576 households, 29.7% had children under 18 living with them, 56.0% were married couples living together, 11.0% had a female householder with no husband present, and 29.5% were not families; 24.8% of households were one person and 8.3% were one person 65 or older. The average household size was 2.56, and the average family size was 3.07.

The age distribution was 23.4% under the age of 18, 9.0% from 18 to 24, 28.1% from 25 to 44, 26.0% from 45 to 64, and 13.5% 65 or older. The median age was 38 years. For every 100 females, there were 94.9 males. For every 100 females age 18 and over, there were 90.3 males.

The median household income was $49,079 and the median family income was $56,543. Males had a median income of $32,917 versus $28,700 for females. The per capita income for the city was $21,743. About 4.8% of families and 8.1% of the population were below the poverty line, including 12.6% of those under 18 and 6.6% of those 65 or over. The median home price for Leon Valley has appreciated every year since 2000. In 2005, the median home price in Leon Valley was $95,480.

== Government and infrastructure ==
The United States Post Office operates the Leon Valley Post Office at 6825 Huebner Road.

== Education ==
Leon Valley residents are zoned to schools in the Northside Independent School District.

Leon Valley is served by these elementary schools:

- Glen Oaks Elementary School (San Antonio)
- Rita Kay Driggers Elementary School (Leon Valley)
- Leon Valley Elementary School (Leon Valley)
- Oak Hills Terrace Elementary School (San Antonio)
- Powell Elementary School (San Antonio)

Leon Valley is served by these middle schools:

- Neff Middle School (San Antonio)
- Ross Middle School (San Antonio)
- Rudder Middle School (San Antonio)

Leon Valley is served by these high schools:

- John Marshall High School (Leon Valley)
- Holmes High School (San Antonio)

Leon Valley also operates the Leon Valley Public Library .
