= Balcones Heights, Texas =

- City
- City Logo
- Interactive map of Balcones Heights, Texas
- Location within Texas Location within the United States Location within North America
- Coordinates: 29°29′23″N 98°32′53″W
- Country: United States
- State: Texas
- County: Bexar

Government
  - Type: Type A general law
  - City council: Mayor Johnny A. Rodriguez Jr. Jack Burton; Juan Lecea; Jimmy Hernandez; Tracy Ebersole; Molly Weaver
  - City administrator: Maria Hernandez

Area
  - Total: 0.66 sq mi (1.70 km^{2})
  - Land: 0.66 sq mi (1.70 km^{2})
  - Water: 0 sq mi (0.00 km^{2})
- Elevation: 833 ft (254 m)

Population (2020)
  - Total: 2,746
  - Density: 5,035.8/sq mi (1,944.32/km^{2})
- Time zone: UTC-6 (Central (CST))
  - Summer (DST): UTC-5 (CDT)
- ZIP code: 78201
- Area codes: 210; 726 (assigned)
- FIPS code: 48-05384
- GNIS feature ID: 1329967
- Website: bhtx.gov

Balcones Heights is a city in Bexar County, Texas, United States. Its population was 2,746 at the 2020 census, and it was incorporated in 1948. Balcones Heights is an enclave of San Antonio, surrounded entirely by the city, thus some residents and out-of-town visitors erroneously consider it merely a neighborhood of the larger city rather than its own unique community that did so to prevent annexation.

== Geography ==
Balcones Heights is located at 29°29′23″N 98°32′53″W (29.489729, –98.547927), nine miles northwest of downtown San Antonio.

According to the United States Census Bureau, the city has a total area of 0.6 square miles (1.6 km^{2}), all land.

== Demographics ==
=== 2020 census ===
As of the 2020 census, Balcones Heights had a population of 2,746. The median age was 35.5 years. 22.3% of residents were under the age of 18 and 11.9% of residents were 65 years of age or older. For every 100 females there were 99.3 males, and for every 100 females age 18 and over there were 100.7 males age 18 and over. There were 558 families residing in the city.

100.0% of residents lived in urban areas, while 0% lived in rural areas.

There were 1,351 households in Balcones Heights, of which 25.0% had children under the age of 18 living in them. Of all households, 20.1% were married-couple households, 34.8% were households with a male householder and no spouse or partner present, and 36.3% were households with a female householder and no spouse or partner present. About 46.9% of all households were made up of individuals and 9.7% had someone living alone who was 65 years of age or older.

There were 1,572 housing units, of which 14.1% were vacant. Among occupied housing units, 15.4% were owner-occupied and 84.6% were renter-occupied. The homeowner vacancy rate was <0.1% and the rental vacancy rate was 11.6%.

Racial composition as of the 2020 census
Race	Percent
White	41.2%
Black or African American	12.9%
American Indian and Alaska Native	1.9%
Asian	1.6%
Native Hawaiian and Other Pacific Islander	0.1%
Some other race	17.7%
Two or more races	24.7%
Hispanic or Latino (of any race)	68.8%

Historical population
Census	Pop.	Note	%±
1950	376		—
1960	950		152.7%
1970	2,504		163.6%
1980	2,640		5.4%
1990	3,022		14.5%
2000	3,016		−0.2%
2010	2,941		−2.5%
2020	2,746		−6.6%
U.S. Decennial Census

=== 2000 census ===
As of the census of 2000, 3,016 people, 1,437 households, and 708 families lived in the city. The population density was 4,674.6 inhabitants per square mile (1,804.9/km^{2}). The 1,539 housing units had an average density of 2,385.4 per square mile (921.0/km^{2}). The racial makeup of the city was 69.66% White, 5.37% African American, 1.56% Native American, 1.13% Asian, 17.44% from other races, and 4.84% from two or more races. Hispanics or Latinos of any race were 69.60% of the population.

Of the 1,437 households, 27.2% had children under 18 living with them, 26.2% were married couples living together, 18.2% had a female householder with no husband present, and 50.7% were not families. About 43.6% of all households were made up of individuals, and 7.7% had someone living alone who was 65 or older. The average household size was 2.10, and the average family size was 2.92.

In the city, the age distribution was 23.7% under 18, 14.5% from 18 to 24, 33.1% from 25 to 44, 19.5% from 45 to 64, and 9.2% who were 65 or older. The median age was 32 years. For every 100 females, there were 107.1 males. For every 100 females 18 and over, there were 107.1 males.

The median income for a household in the city was $21,452, and for a family was $27,074. Males had a median income of $21,209 versus $18,944 for females. The per capita income for the city was $13,529. About 18.1% of families and 21.1% of the population were below the poverty line, including 23.6% of those under 18 and 15.2% of those 65 or over.

== Education ==
Most of the city is served by San Antonio Independent School District.

In regards to school zoning, most residents of the San Antonio ISD section are zoned to Baskin Academy, with a small portion zoned to Maverick Elementary and Arnold Elementary. All such residents are zoned to Longfellow Middle School, and Jefferson High School, all in San Antonio.

Some of the city is served by the North East Independent School District. In regards to school zoning, the portion is served by Dellview Elementary School, Jackson Middle School, and LEE High School, all in San Antonio.
