= Eugene Lacritz =

- Also known as: Gene Lacritz
- Born: Eugene Edward Lacritz; November 16, 1929; Salem, Massachusetts
- Died: May 18, 2012 (aged 82) San Antonio, Texas
- Genres: symphony, pops orchestra, musical theater
- Occupations: clarinetist, conductor
- Instruments: clarinet, saxophone
- Years active: 1949–1974 (music); 1956–1986 (retail executive)

Eugene Edward (Gene) Lacritz (16 November 1929 in Salem, Massachusetts – 18 May 2012 in San Antonio) was an American conductor, clarinetist, saxophonist, and a 31-year professional in management roles at four former specialty retail institutions, one in Houston and three in San Antonio. Notably, he was a senior executive — initially store manager and ultimately executive vice president — at Frost Bros., a former large apparel retail concern based in San Antonio.

== Early life and family ==
Eugene Lacritz was born on 16 November 1929 to Louis (1898-1989) and Rose Lacritz (née Abowitz or Abovitz) (1904-1993). Eugene's father was born in Volodymyr, Ukraine and Eugene's mother was born in Poland. Both became U.S. citizens in 1921 and 1910, respectively. Eugene's paternal grandfather, Isaac (Itzhak) Lacritz (1868–1949) was musically and artistically inclined and served in a Russian Army band. Eugene had one sister, Shirley (born 1927).

On 3 April 1956, Lacritz married Miriam Suzanne Netter (1931-1975) in San Antonio, Texas. They had three children, Jeffrey Scott, John Alan and Laura Jann. They had 5 grandchildren.

On 9 July 1976, he married Shirley Ann Remis (1931-2008) in San Antonio, Texas. Lacritz had three stepchildren, Lee, Larry and Lynn, from his wife's previous marriage.

== Music career ==
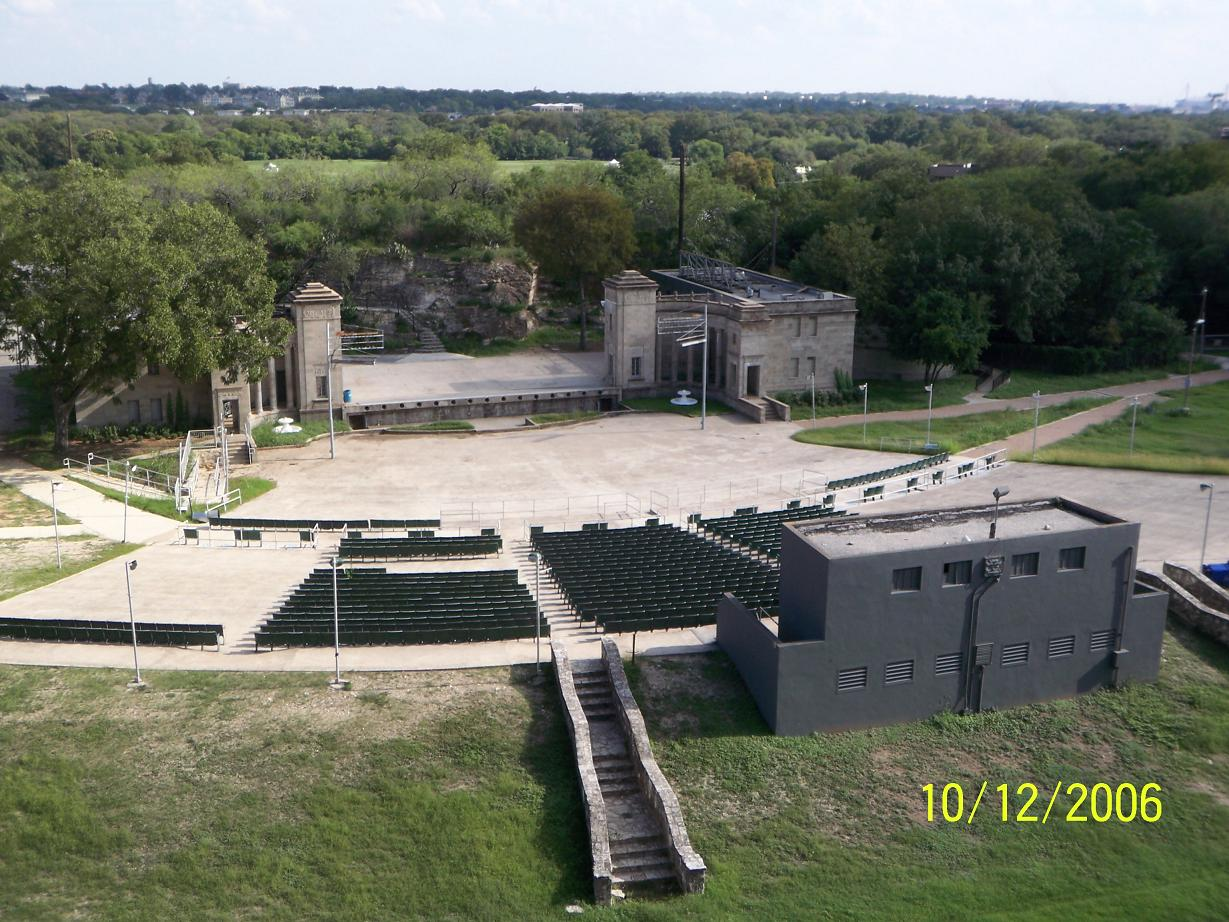
Sunken Garden Amphitheater Japanese Tea Garden San Antonio Image info

Lacritz became a member of the San Antonio Symphony Orchestra as a clarinetist in 1952 under the music direction of Victor Alessandro, who, in 1951, appointed him as conductor the San Antonio Pops, and in 1953, Chief Conductor of the Pops — a role held by Lacritz until 1958. The Pops was a seasonal auxiliary of the San Antonio Symphony that typically performed 15 times a year. He also had a long association as conductor of the San Antonio Little Theater that began in 1956 and continued through the 1960s.
Notable performances as clarinetist & saxophonist

- June 4, 1951 — Divertimento No. 1 (Trio No. 1, Op. 1), by for clarinet, violin, and trombone, by John Alexander Bavicchi (born 1922)

Eugene Lacritz (clarinet), Millard S. Neiger (born 1924) (trombone); JoAnne Dempsey (violin)

- 17 Nov 1951 — Paul Hindemith, News of the Day (Overture), San Antonio Symphony Orchestra, Victor Alessandro, conductor; Lacritz was a featured alto saxophonist

Notable performances as conductor

Cosmopolitan Opera Guild of San Antonio

- May 1955 — Martha

San Pedro Playhouse

- October 1956 — Pagliacci

San Pedro Playhouse

San Antonio Little Theater

- May 1958 — Plain and Fancy
- May 1959 — Damn Yankees
- July 1965 — Oklahoma!

Sunken Garden Amphitheater, San Antonio Japanese Tea Garden

- October 1965 — The Music Man (nine performances)
- July 1966 — The Sound of Music

Sunken Garden Amphitheater, San Antonio Japanese Tea Garden

== Selected compositions ==
- It's Against My Principles, Eugene Edward Lacritz, © 7 May 1953 EU315348
- Saint Mary’s Hall, Eugene Edward Lacritz, © 6 April 1990 PAu001377914

== Music education ==
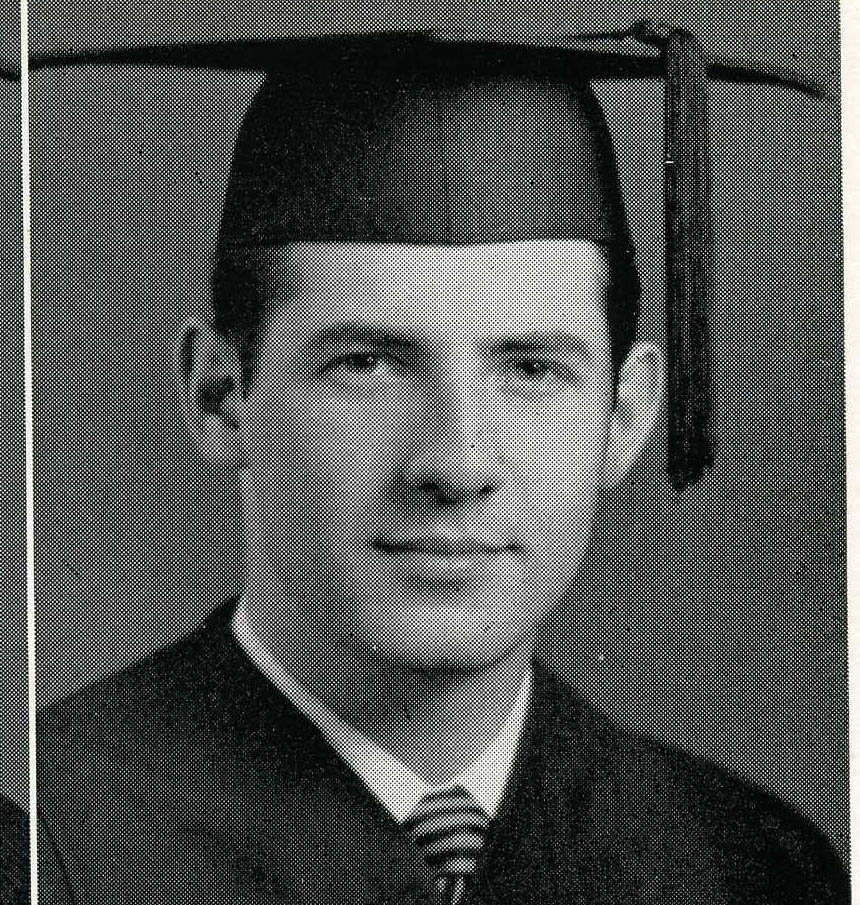
Eugene Lacritz The Neume (1951 yearbook) New England Conservatory Archives, Boston Image info

Higher education

Lacritz studied music at, and earned a Bachelor of Music with honors from, The New England Conservatory of Music (NEC), majoring in clarinet. His clarinet teacher was Rosario Mazzeo (1911–1997). His other teachers included Betty Hilker (piano), Francis M. Findlay (1894–1967) (orchestra), George Moleux (1900–1966) (band), Francis Judd Cooke (1910–1995) (musical form & contemporary music), Susan Williams (harmony), and Warren Storey Smith (1885–1971) (music history). Lacritz attended NEC for one extra semester in Spring 1954. That semester he studied clarinet with Mazzeo and Advanced Ensemble and Orchestra Drill with Fernand Gillet.

While at NEC, Lacritz served as Vice President of Kappa Gamma Psi (1949); he was on the Dean's list in 1949; he served as Business manager for the NEC quarterly publication, The Melodic Line and The Neume, the Conservatory's yearbook. Lacritz also was president of his sophomore class and student council.

While in living in Massachusetts, Lacritz was a member of the Boston Civic Symphony, the New England Philharmonic, and the Salem Philharmonic.

Secondary education

Lacritz graduated from Salem High School, Massachusetts, June 1947.

== Executive career ==
In June 1957, Lacritz became head of the a new phonograph record department at Wolff & Marx's. Later, he served as store manager for Battlestein's in River Oaks, Houston. Later he returned to San Antonio to manage Town & Country fashions. In 1963, he was appointed manager of Frost Fashion Square at North Star Mall in San Antonio — the major retail department store that opened October 21, 1963. The store was the company's first urban venture and included all the services and fashion departments of its flagship store in downtown San Antonio. Frost Bros. billed itself as one of the finest specialty stores in the Southwest and one of the most famous among the few locally and independently owned specialty stores in America.

The heirs of Philip Battlestein (1870–1955) sold the Battlestein stores in 1967 to Manhattan Industries, Inc., a New York-based shirt maker who, in 1969 acquired Frost Bros. The two chains merged under the Frost name. In 1980, Lacritz was promoted from senior vice president to executive vice president in charge of planning and construction of Frost Bros.' expansion program. Under the duress of debt, the Torie Steele Group — headed by Samuel Evans Wyly (born 1934) of Dallas — acquired Frost Bros. in 1986 for $50 million. Eight years earlier (May 20, 1978), Wyly married Victoria L (Torie) Steele (born 1955). Under the strain of insolvency while owned by the Torie Steel Group, Frost Bros. liquidated in bankruptcy in 1989. Lacritz was executive vice president at Frost Bros. up until just prior to its bankruptcy in 1988.

== U.S. Armed Forces ==
Lacritz served in the U.S. Navy in the early 1950s and was both an instructor at the U.S. Navy School of Music in Washington, D.C. and a student, notably of conducting.
