= Perry Ellis (brand) =

American designer fashion clothing brand

Logo

Perry Ellis is an American designer fashion clothing brand owned by Perry Ellis International founded by eponymous American designer Perry Ellis.

In June 2003, Perry Ellis merged with Salant Corporation, manufacturer of the brand's clothes, for about $80 million. The combined company offers about 25 brands.

== History ==
Perry Ellis, with his parent company the Vera Companies, founded his own fashion house, Perry Ellis International, in 1978. He opened his showroom on New York City's Seventh Avenue. As chairman and head designer he started the Perry Ellis Menswear Collection. Perry Ellis won eight Coty Awards between 1979 and 1984 (the last year that they were given) and a Council of Fashion Designers of America (CFDA) Award in 1983. He served as President of the CFDA in 1984

Ellis' colleague, Richard Haines, attributed to him "classic with a twist." Perry Ellis said he was inspired "to design clothes that are more obtainable, more relaxed, but ultimately more stylish and witty."

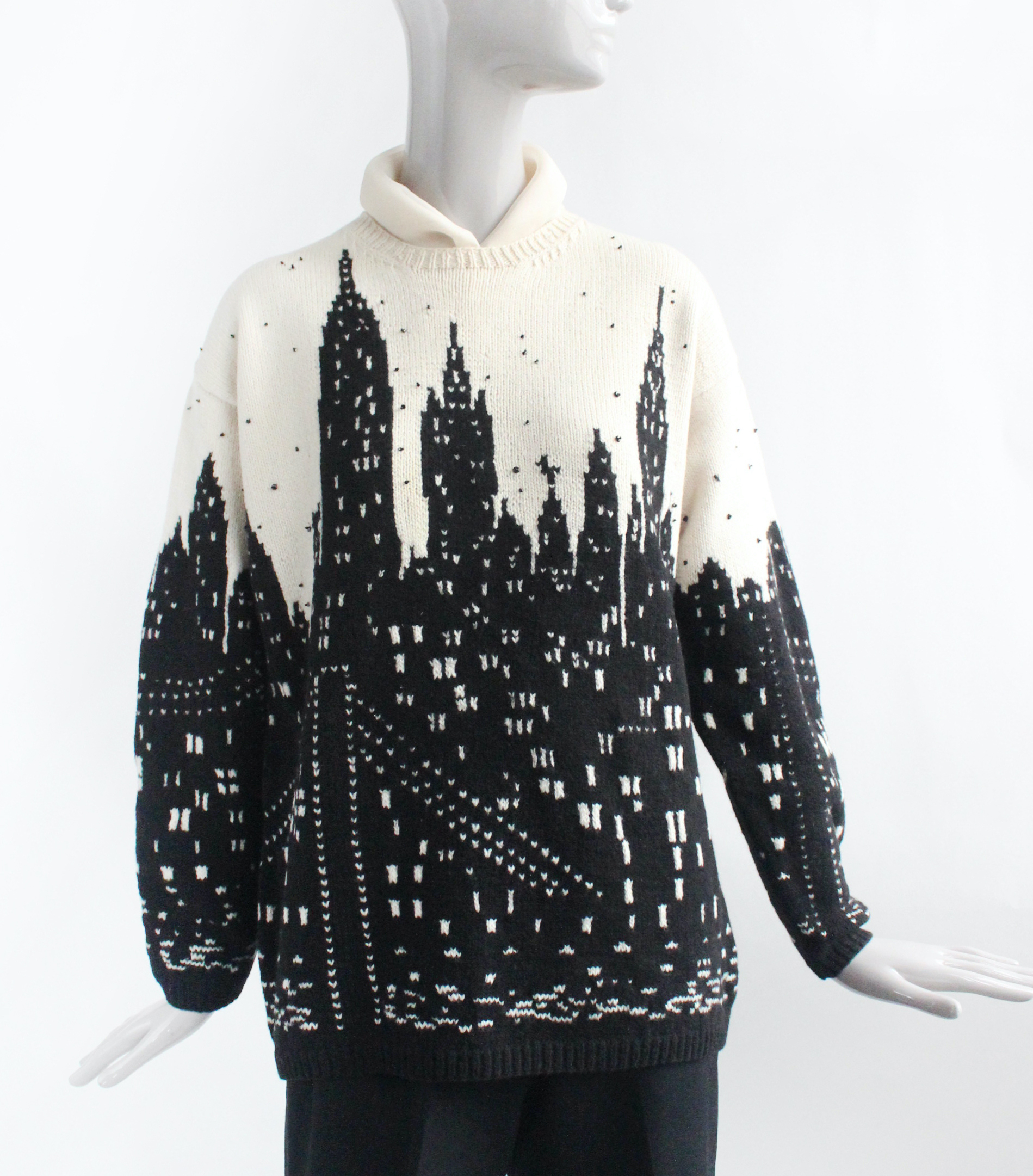
Marc Jacobs for Perry Ellis Sweater, Fall/ Winter 1990. Adnan Ege Kutay Collection.

In early 1986, Robert L. McDonald, a former film producer and friend of Ellis, succeeded Laughlin Barker, Ellis' domestic partner, who had died in January of that year as president of Perry Ellis International. After Ellis' death in May 1986, McDonald announced that under the terms of Ellis' will he had full control of the company in trust for Ellis' heirs. "Perry wanted us to continue, of course", he said of the fashion house's future. McDonald led the company through setbacks and challenges. Recommended to McDonald by the fashion director of Bloomingdale's, Marc Jacobs, a Parsons graduate who started his own label in 1986 and became head designer of Louis Vuitton in Paris in 1997, designed for the house of Perry Ellis from 1988 to 1993.

In 1986, Manhattan Industries, the parent of the Vera Companies (the owner of Perry Ellis), was sold to Salant, a licensee of Perry Ellis. From then, Perry Ellis was acquired by Supreme Inc., a Miami-based textile concern owned by George Feldenkreis, in 1999. The company's shares rose from $1.625 to $16 in January following the acquisition. Supreme was then renamed Perry Ellis International.

In 1993 Supreme International went public and after acquiring the Perry Ellis brand in 1999 became Perry Ellis International (PEI) which he has since built into a multinational corporation with annual revenues of nearly $1 billion as of 2020s

In 2003, in turn, Perry Ellis International acquired Salant. The corporation has since then acquired various other textile companies, such as Original Penguin and golf brand Ping Collection, among many others.

== Brands ==
Salant acquired closely held Axis Clothing Corp. in 2002, a year before being acquired in 2003 by Perry Ellis. The Axis LA brand clothing company was based in Culver City. Axis sells men's sweaters, pants, jeans and shirts in U.S. department stores.

== Awards and distinctions ==
- In Ellis' time, he earned eight Coty American Fashion Critics' Awards from the cosmetics and perfume company Coty, Inc.
- He was presented with the Council of Fashion Designers of America (CFDA) Fashion Award in 1981.
- In 1986, the annual Perry Ellis Award—now known as the Swarovski Emerging Talent Award—was created to honor emerging fashion designers. The first designer to receive it in 1986 was David Cameron. Recent winners include Zac Posen in 2004, Derek Lam in 2005, and Trovata in 2006.
- In 1986, during the CFDA awards at New York's Lincoln Center a Special Tribute was awarded to Perry Ellis.
- Perry Ellis is honored with a commemorative white bronze plaque embedded into the sidewalk on New York's Seventh "Fashion" Avenue in 2002.

== On the red carpet ==
The Perry Ellis brand has made an impression on the red carpet and in Hollywood. Perry Ellis has paired with Vanity Fair to host parties for nominated television series. Perry Ellis and Vanity Fair have held toasts and pre-Emmy parties for nominees including Heroes in 2007, 30 Rock in 2008, and The Office in 2010 at the Chateau Marmont in Los Angeles. In 2011, Parks and Recreation was toasted by Perry Ellis and Vanity Fair at the Eveleigh in West Hollywood.

The brand has struck up a celebrity fan-base including Joe Manganiello of HBO's True Blood. In his interview with GQ backstage at the Perry Ellis Spring 2012 runway show Manganiello said, "I always told myself if 'I made it,' I'd look the part."

B-list celebrities have repeatedly worn Perry Ellis ensembles on the red carpet. Glee's Chris Colfer wore a Perry Ellis outfit to the Outfest Film Festival Awards in 2010. Former NFL receiver Hank Baskett, husband of Kendra Wilkinson, has worn Perry Ellis at several events including the Espy Awards for ESPN. Perry Ellis attire has also been seen on personalities like E! Entertainment's Jason Kennedy.

== See also ==
- Fashion in the United States

== Sources ==
- Announcement of Perry Ellis' death in the New York Times – May 31, 1986
- 2001 W magazine article on Tyler Alexandra Gallagher Ellis, Perry Ellis' own daughter
- Perry Ellis Fashion shoot at his high school, Woodrow Wilson
