= Irving Allen Mathews =

American businessman

Irving Allen Mathews (8 Apr 1917 Toledo, Ohio – 7 February 1994, San Antonio) was an American specialty retail executive, who devoted 41 years to Frost Bros., formerly of San Antonio, Texas. He also served as Board Chairman of the Federal Reserve Bank of Dallas.

== Career at Frost Bros. ==
Mathews began a 41-year career with Frost Bros. as a fashion buyer, ascending to president of its specialty clothing store at North Star Mall in 1963. Frost Bros. was sold in 1970 to Manhattan Industries Inc. In 1971, Mathews became director of the company and served as CEO of the retail division until the chain was sold in 1986.

== Stewardship in banking ==
Mathews served as a director of Frost National Bank of San Antonio from 1981 up until his death in 1994.

== Stewardship in U.S. monetary policy ==
In 1971, the Federal Reserve System Board of Governors appointed Mathews director of the San Antonio branch. He served as chairman of the board of the Federal Reserve Bank of Dallas from 1972 to 1973, and as a class C director of the Dallas branch from 1974 to 1980.

== San Antonio Spurs ==
Mathews was a founding stockholder in the San Antonio Spurs National Basketball Association franchise and one of only two of the original stockholders still holding a financial interest at his death.

== Education ==
A native of Toledo, Ohio, he attended the University of Michigan, where he received a bachelor's degree in economics in 1938.

== U.S. Armed Forces ==
Mathews served as a captain in the U.S. Army during World War II.

== Family ==
Irving's father, Samuel Henry Mathews (1893–1951), had owned an apparel retail store in Toledo, Ohio. On September 1, 1945 — while a Lieutenant in the U.S. Army stationed at Fort Sam Houston — Irving married Jeanne Lang, daughter of Sylvan Lang, co-owner of Frost Bros.

== Affiliations ==
Mathews was a past director of the San Antonio Symphony, United Fund, the Jewish Social Service Federation of San Antonio and the National Board of the American Jewish Committee.
