= Perry Ellis =

American fashion designer (1940–1986)

- Born: March 3, 1940; Portsmouth, Virginia, U.S.
- Died: May 30, 1986 (aged 46); New York City, U.S.
- Resting place: Evergreen Memorial Park
- Education: College of William and Mary; New York University
- Occupation: Fashion designer
- Label: Perry Ellis
- Children: 1
- Awards: 1979–1984 Coty Awards (eight); 1983 Council of Fashion Designers of America (CFDA) Fashion Award; 2002 commemorative white bronze plaque

Perry Edwin Ellis (March 3, 1940 – May 30, 1986) was an American fashion designer who founded his eponymous sportswear house in the mid-1970s. Ellis's influence on the fashion industry has been called "a huge turning point" because he introduced new patterns and proportions to a market which was dominated by more traditional men's clothing.

== Early life ==
Ellis was born in Portsmouth, Virginia, on March 3, 1940, the only child of Edwin and Winifred Rountree Ellis. His father owned a coal and home heating oil company, which enabled the family to live a comfortable middle-class life. Ellis graduated from Woodrow Wilson High School in Portsmouth, Virginia, in 1957. He then studied at the College of William and Mary in Williamsburg, Virginia, and graduated with a degree in business administration in 1961. To avoid the draft, Ellis enlisted in the United States Coast Guard Reserve with service that included six months' active duty with the Coast Guard. He graduated from New York University with a master's degree in retailing in 1963.

== Career ==
Ellis started out in department store retailing in the Richmond, Virginia, area to gain experience in the fashion industry as a buyer and merchandiser at the department store Miller & Rhoads. While there, he was co-founder of a Richmond retail shop, A Sunny Day. He later joined the sportswear company John Meyer of Norwich in Manhattan.

In the mid-1970s, he was approached by his then-employer, The Vera Companies, famous for their polyester double-knit pantsuits, to design a fashion collection for them. In November 1976, Ellis presented his first women's sportswear line, called Portfolio. Although he was not a skilled sketch artist, he knew exactly how the industry worked and proved a master of innovative ideas who created "new classics" that American women longed for at the time. He was initially known for his versions of the oversized, unconstructed, layered, natural-fiber Big Look or Soft Look that was the leading high-fashion trend of the mid-seventies, for which he was compared favorably to Kenzo, the 1973 originator of the look. Ellis enhanced this trend by creating substantial, hand-knit-looking sweaters in rough-hewn textures that combined well with the earthtones and loose shapes of the period. He would be known for his sweaters for the rest of his career.

Together with The Vera Companies' parent company, Manhattan Industries, he founded his own fashion house, Perry Ellis International, in 1978, opening his showroom on New York's Seventh Avenue. That same year, he interpreted the new big shoulders of the fall in a way that proved more popular with the US public than the extreme forties-revival looks emanating from Europe, adding large but soft shoulder pads to his familiar earthy textures in new, slimmed down, but still casual shapes. He explicitly endorsed the trend for layering one set of shoulder pads on top of another, which would become common in the 1980s, as would the flounced miniskirts, called rah-rah skirts in the UK, that he and Norma Kamali introduced the following year. He had been one of the first mainstream designers to revive miniskirts in 1978. Also in 1979, he began introducing other means to widen the shoulder besides padding, mainly via adding fullness at the top of the sleeves with gathers and folds. He played with silhouettes by showing knee-length and shorter circle skirts and calf-length culottes (a word he disliked, preferring "cropped pants") with unusually-proportioned tops, while still staying true to the fresh, natural look of earth-toned textiles that he had refined during the Soft Look period. His cropped pants, cropped sweaters, and dimpled sleeves of the end of the seventies were very influential.

As the company's chairman and head designer he later developed Perry Ellis Menswear Collection – marked by "non-traditional, modern classics." Step by step, he added shoes, accessories, furs and perfume that all bear his name. Throughout the 1980s, the Perry Ellis company continued to expand and include various labels, such as Perry Ellis Collection and Perry Ellis Portfolio.

During the first half of the 1980s, Perry Ellis was as prominent a US fashion name as Calvin Klein and Ralph Lauren. He continued to be known for the sweaters, cropped trousers, and silhouette experimentation that he had begun at the end of the seventies, including the flippy miniskirts that he and Norma Kamali introduced in 1979. He was also known for the very high quality of his fabrics, most of which he imported from Europe. He was one of 15 designers asked by US Vogue in 1980 which designer they most admired. Many participants chose Balenciaga and Chanel, but Ellis selected Kenzo as his favorite, citing Kenzo's independence and uniqueness.

In 1980, Ellis explored handmade knitwear, enlarged patterns, and enlarged Argyle and launched his first male collection. He added petticoats and side width to the full, hip-yoked miniskirts he had introduced the previous year. As an additional alternative to the prominent shoulder-padding he had become known for in 1978, he used capelet collars to add width and continued to incorporate top-of-sleeve tucks and pleats. For spring of 1981, he presented soft corsets and hip-padded versions of the short skirts he had begun showing in 1979, and he began using a few more substantial fabrics for shaping. This former leader of the mid-seventies Big Look joined Fall 1981's brief return to that style with relish, showing longer lengths, loose layers, and harem pants with Cossack-inspired hats and capes, though the look this time was more structured, via cummerbunds, extended shoulders, and tulle petticoats.

In 1982, Perry Ellis won the Council of Fashion Designers of America's Designer of the Year award, at a time when his company had more than 75 staff. He released his "Chariots of Fire" collection for spring of that year, continuing to show the longer lengths he had favored the previous fall, though never exclusively. For his fall 1982 collection, he tried his hand at some of the highly tailored suit styles that had dominated fashion since 1978, to a cooler-than-usual critical reception. In 1983, he showed high-waisted fit-and-flare skirts and slim trousers with short jackets.

He reduced the rise of the previous year's high waistband somewhat for Spring of 1984, when he presented a collection intended to suggest an idyllic Australia, replete with his well-loved cropped trousers, cropped jackets, and focus on long skirts. In 1984, Perry Ellis America was created in cooperation with Levi Strauss and he revived his lesser-priced Portfolio product line, filling it with the kind of soft, unlined, comfortable clothes he had shown in the mid-seventies, now updated with broader shoulders. His Fall 1984 collection for both men and women was an homage to artist Sonia Delaunay and focused on Ellis's trademark sweaters in Delaunay colors. Prints and slimmer, more minimal shapes were a focus for his Spring 1985 collection, with large florals, revealing cuts, and tunic sweaters prominent. These closer-to-the-body cuts would continue through the end of the year, enlivened by prints and colors inspired by Chinese porcelains.

In the early 1980s, wholesale revenues had figured at about $60 million. By 1986 that number had risen to about $260 million.

Highly praised professionally and personally, Ellis believed that "fashion dies when you take it too seriously." Of Perry Ellis's fashion design, Michael Bastian remarked that "no one did it better...He was able to be modern and yet not come off antiseptic." New York Times fashion columnist Bernadine Morris praised Ellis's tweeds and sweaters as "comfortable and forever-looking," with the "insouciant feeling of a college woman slipping into her boyfriend's jacket that is a size or so too big for her, or putting together a jacket and a pair of pants in patterns that don't quite match, but look quite appealing," while Steven Kolb, CEO of the Council of Fashion Designers of America, described Ellis' fashion as "my way to step forward in fashion, but to still have a comfort level. It helped define my personality."

Ellis served as president of the Council of Fashion Designers of America (CFDA) from 1984 to 1986.

== Personal life ==
In 1981, Ellis began a relationship with attorney Laughlin Barker. Later that year, Ellis appointed Barker the president of the licensing division of Perry Ellis International. They remained together until Barker's death in January 1986.

In February 1984, Ellis and his long-time friend, television producer and writer Barbara Gallagher, conceived a child together via artificial insemination. Their daughter, Tyler Alexandra Gallagher Ellis, was born in November 1984. Ellis bought a home for Gallagher and their daughter in Brentwood, Los Angeles, and would visit frequently. In 2011, Tyler released her first line of handbags using the name Tyler Alexandra.

== Illness and death ==
In October 1985, rumors that Ellis had contracted AIDS began to surface when he appeared on the runway at the end of his Fall fashion show. By that time, Ellis had lost a considerable amount of weight and looked much older. Around the same time, Ellis' partner Laughlin Barker was undergoing chemotherapy for Kaposi's sarcoma, an AIDS-related cancer that later metastasized to his lungs. Ellis continued to deny that he was sick, but rumors of his illness persisted after he passed out in the receiving line at a party at the Costume Institute in December 1985. On January 2, 1986, Barker died of lung cancer at the couple's home in Manhattan. After Barker's death, Ellis' health rapidly declined. By May 1986, Ellis had contracted viral encephalitis which caused paralysis on one side of his face. Despite his appearance, he insisted on appearing at his fall fashion show held in New York City on May 8. At the end of the show, Ellis attempted to walk the runway for his final bow but was so weak, he had to be supported by two assistants. It was his final public appearance. Ellis was hospitalized soon after and slipped into a coma. He died of viral encephalitis on May 30, 1986. A spokesperson for Ellis' company would not comment on whether the designer's death was AIDS-related stating, "Those were Perry's wishes."

Most newspapers omitted the AIDS rumors from Ellis' obituary and simply attributed his death to encephalitis. In August 1986, New York magazine writer Patricia Morrisroe wrote a story about Ellis where she concluded that, "...many people believe Ellis had AIDS, and given the evidence, it seems likely." A 1993 article from the Associated Press included Ellis among its list of better known AIDS victims.

== Legacy ==
Steven Kolb defined Perry Ellis' legacy with the following words: "In terms of men's fashion, he was the first to bring the idea of dressing up in a casual way to the American man". In 1986, the annual Perry Ellis Award—now known as the Swarovski Emerging Talent Award—was created to honor emerging talents in the world of men's and women's fashion designers. The first designer to receive it was David Cameron.

Though he worked as a designer for less than a decade, over 25 years after his death his work is "still seen as incredibly influential".

In 1999, Miami-based textile company Supreme International purchased the Perry Ellis brand from Salant, a licensee of Perry Ellis that acquired it from Manhattan Industries in 1986. Supreme renamed itself Perry Ellis International and the company became traded on the NASDAQ under PERY. Perry Ellis International also owns and licenses other notable fashion brands, such as Original Penguin by Munsingwear, Cubavera, C&C California, Rafaella, Laundry by Shelli Segal, Ben Hogan, Jantzen, Nike Swim and Callaway, among others.

In the twenty-first century, the Perry Ellis brand has continued to expand. Building upon styles set forth by Ellis, the brand has successfully continued to expand, collaborate with other designers, such as Duckie Brown, and hold critical acclaim.

== Awards ==
- During the CFDA awards at New York City's Lincoln Center in 1986, Ellis was posthumously awarded a Special Tribute.
- Ellis won eight Coty Awards between 1979 and 1984, the last year that they were given.
- He was presented with the Council of Fashion Designers of America (CFDA) Fashion Award in 1981.
- In 2002, Ellis was honored with a commemorative white bronze plaque embedded into the sidewalk on Seventh Avenue in New York in the so-called Fashion Walk of Fame located on the part of Seventh Avenue called "Fashion Avenue."

== See also ==
- Fashion in the United States
- Perry Ellis (brand)
- Perry Ellis International
