= Gwilym Pugh =

Welsh model and musician

- Born: Gwilym C. Pugh; 25 May 1984 (age 41); Rugby, Warwickshire, England
- Occupations: Model, musician
- Years active: 2009-present
- Website: gwilymcpugh.com

Gwilym Pugh (born 25 May 1984) is a Welsh model and musician. He is based in London. He has worked with multiple fashion brands including Diesel, Esprit, Canada Goose, Peek & Cloppenburg and Original Penguin. He has also appeared in promotional campaigns for various prominent brands including Vans, Timberland, BMW Motorrad, Haig Club Whiskey, LG Mobile and VO5. Pugh has been featured in photo-editorial campaigns in fashion publications including British Gentlemen's Quarterly, Hunger Magazine and Red Hot 100, a Thomas Knights' series of images of red-haired men.

Gwilym currently has over 268,000 followers on Instagram.

== Early life ==
Pugh was born in 1984, in Rugby, Warwickshire, England, in a family of musicians. His mother is a violinist, pianist and music teacher and his father, David Pugh is a trombonist with the Cardiff band Funky Love Posse. Pugh attended Cardiff High School where he completed his early education. At the age of 21, Pugh set up a mortgage company in Cardiff. He started playing guitar in 2008 and began his modelling career in 2013.

== Career ==
Pugh initially started his working life in Finance, going on to set up his own life insurance business in 2010, I'm Insured. Alongside this, he started pursuing a career as a musician by setting up his band, The Magic Rooster Brothers, in 2011. The name of the band was inspired from a song called The Magic Rooster Blues. Pugh's focus shifted to modelling in 2013 when he was selected to be the face of Nathan Palmer Clothing in Cardiff. Following this he was approached by multiple photographers to shoot with them for their portfolios. In December 2013, Pugh appeared on the back cover of the book 100 beards by Jonathan Daniel Pryce.

In 2014, Pugh shot for The Red Hot exhibition focusing on men with red hair. Later that year, he moved to London where he was signed to AMCK Models, a London-based modelling agency, KULT agency in Hamburg and Major Milano in Milan. Between 2014 and 2017, Pugh modeled for major brands that included TV commercial for Haig Club Whiskey. He also worked for Diesel, Esprit, Canada Goose, Peek & Cloppenburg and Original Penguin. Pugh has been the face of major promotional campaigns for BMW Motorrad and LG Mobile.

== Personal life ==
In 2018, Wales Online printed an article about Gwilym's transformation after losing 6.5 stones (over 40 kg) and subsequently it went viral. It was picked up by English and international publications such as The Telegraph, INSIDER, The South African, and People Magazine.
