= Grethel =

Grethel may refer to:

- Grethel, Kentucky, an unincorporated community located in Floyd County
- Henry Grethel, an American fashion designer
