= Rafaella =

Women's clothing brand

- Company type: Subsidiary
- Industry: Fashion/Apparel
- Founded: 1982
- Headquarters: Miami, FL
- Products: Women's Clothing
- Parent: Perry Ellis International
- Website: www.rafaellasportswear.com

Rafaella, or Rafaella Sportswear, is a women's clothing brand owned by the publicly held international clothing company Perry Ellis International. Originally created by Rafaella Apparel Group, the brand changed ownership to Cerberus Capital Management before being bought and expanded by Perry Ellis.

== History ==
The Rafaella brand name was established under the company Rafaella Apparel Group, Inc. in 1982 in New York City, New York to suit the clothing needs of working women in the United States of America. The Rafaella brand became quickly gained popularity among professional women because of the quality the brand offered. Additionally, Rafaella was among the first women's dress clothing lines to offer its pants styles across a wide range of pant fits. Rafaella's offering of "Modern," "Classic," and "Curvy," fit types has been mirrored by other clothing companies, including Levi Strauss & Co. In pioneering the sales technique of offering the same style in multiple female body types, Rafaella was able to win market share over its competitors, solidifying the company's success toward the end of the 20th Century. The brand has been featured in several issues of O, The Oprah Magazine and on the Oprah Winfrey Show and has been the subject of fashion editorials and reviews for its women's dress pants, dress shirts, dresses, and swim/sportswear.

=== Management Changes and Expansion ===
Rafaella Apparel Group was bought by Cerberus Capital Management and was later sold in January 2011 to its current owner, Perry Ellis International for $70 million USD. Perry Ellis International expanded the brand, continuing its dresswear line while broadening its focus on dresses and sportswear. Under Perry Ellis, the brand's new looks gained positive reviews In July 2012 fashion executive Denise Miller was instated as the President of Rafaella in order to further expand that vision. Miller previously worked for Kellwood Company as well as G-III Apparel, Ltd., where she was the President of Calvin Klein suits and suit separates. Another major management change was subsequently made in 2013 when Karol Rosa, model and co-host of Sabado Gigante, was hired as the Brand Ambassador for Rafaella. Despite the ownership and management changes, the company remains headquartered in New York City.
