= William Openhym & Sons =

- Headquarters: New York, New York, United States
- Subsidiaries: Manhattan Shirt Company

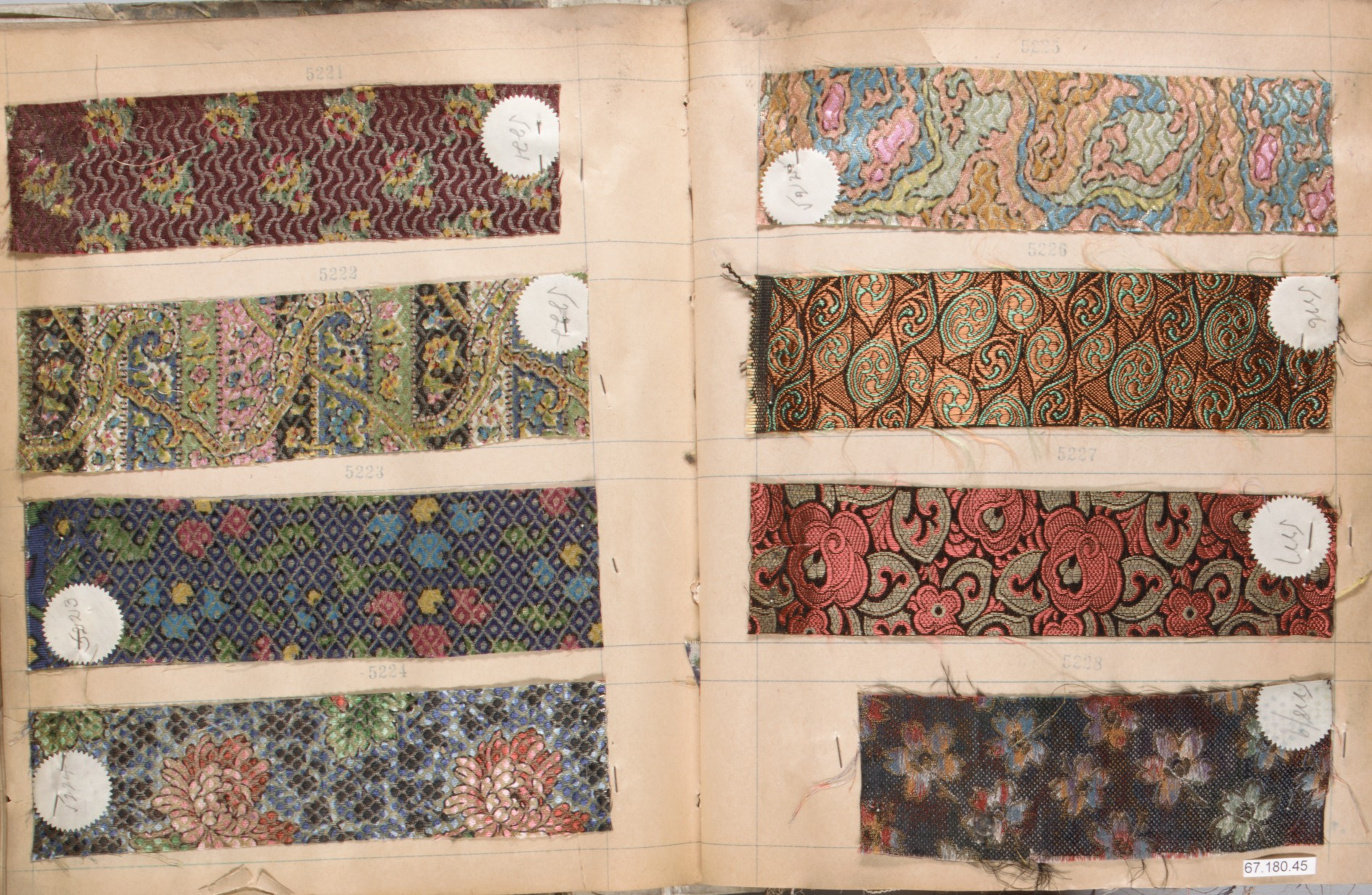
William Openhym & Sons textile sample book pages

William Openhym & Sons was a wholesale silk company in New York. The Manhattan Shirt Company was a subsidiary. The Copper Hewitt Museum has fabric samples from the company in its collection. The Queens Library has a silver gelatin print of the company's mill as well as the home of the mill's superintendent Jacob Salathe.

The company operated Myhnepo mill in College Point, New York. Myhnepo is Openhym spelled backwards.

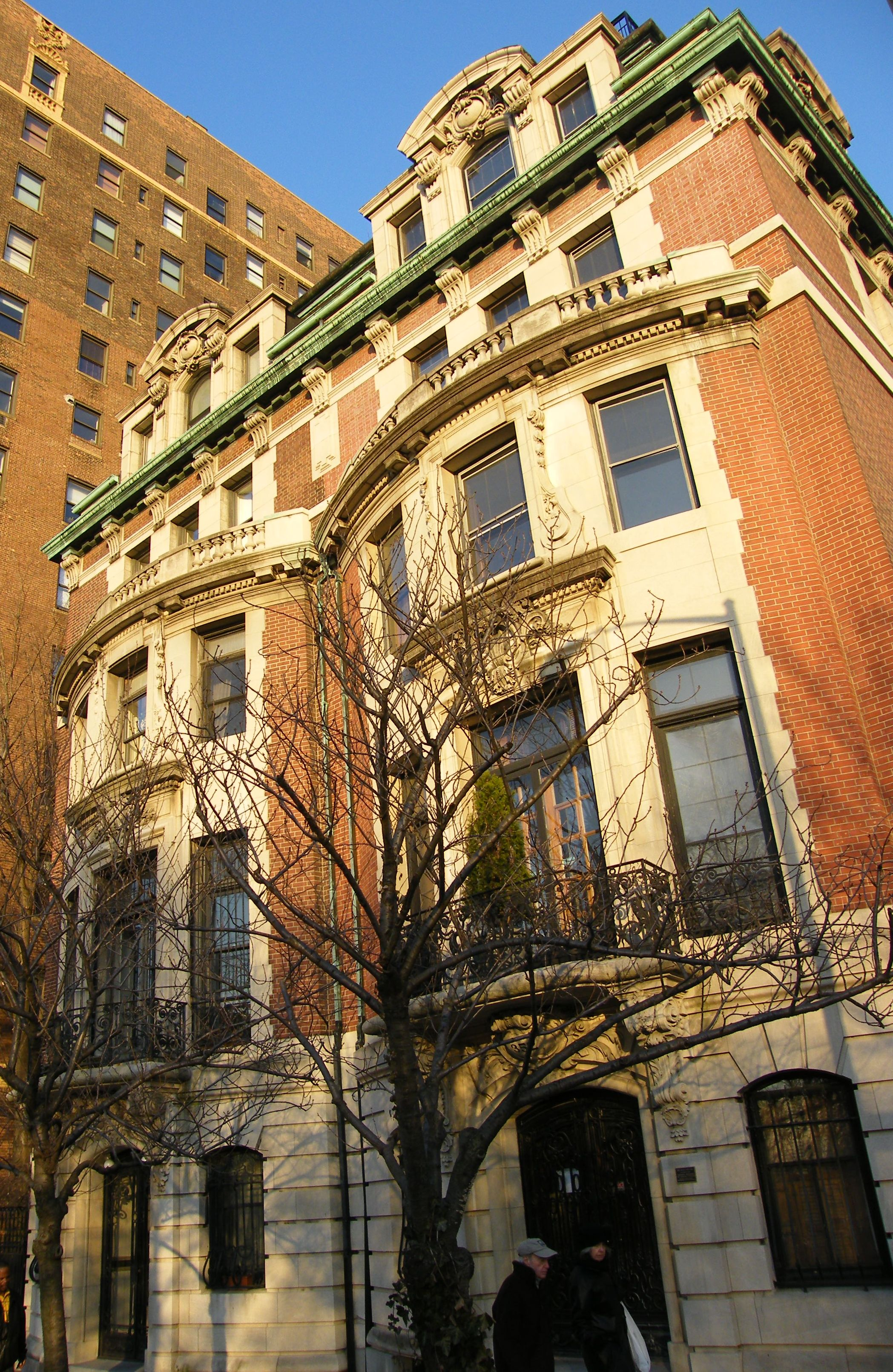
352 and 353 Riverside Drive

Adolphe Openhym (1854 - 1903), a member of the family, was the original owner of 352 Riverside Drive, a property later owned by hedge fund manager Jim Rogers, oil tycoon scion Helen Hunt, and Amy Schumer. It is listed on the National Register of Historic Places.

In 1910 the company was the plaintiff in a case against a trustee that took possession of its goods from a bankrupt company. The company was an early tenant in the Emmet Building in New York City.

Adolphe Openhym died in a suspected suicide committed by jumping off High Bridge into the Harlem River.

Augustus W. Openhym died April 24, 1912, at Hotel Walton in New York City. The company's address was listed as 33 Mercer Street.
