= Anchor Blue Clothing Company =

American clothing retailer

Anchor Blue Inc. (formerly Miller's Outpost) was an American clothing retailer which had over 100 stores in the western United States. It generally sold its own Anchor Blue brand name of youth-oriented denim, graphic T-shirts and casual clothing. Sometimes the company was referred to as the Anchor Blue Inc., but their retail clothing chain of stores was labeled as Anchor Blue. The Anchor Blue and Miller's Outpost brands were acquired by Perry Ellis International in 2012.

== Early history ==
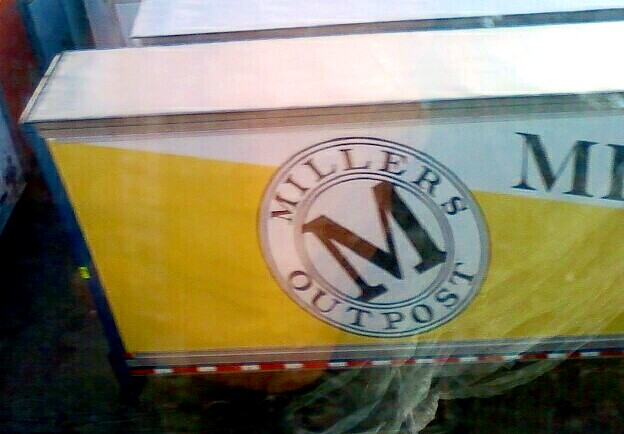
A former Miller's Outpost semi-trailer bearing the company's 1990's-era logo.

The origins of Anchor Blue Clothing Company date to 1948 when brothers Dave and Lou Miller founded Miller's Surplus store (originally Ontario War Surplus). The Ontario, California-based surplus store sold both military surplus and clothing during its early days. The shop gained popularity among local youth as being one of the few places in the area that sold Levi's jeans. The Miller brothers decided to pursue separate ventures and as a result the business folded in the early 1970s.

Lou's enterprise, Lou Miller's, eventually had branches in the City of Orange in the Mall of Orange, San Bernardino, Riverside, Montclair and East Los Angeles.

Dave Miller founded his own clothing retail store named Miller's Outpost in 1972. The business debuted in Ontario and Pomona specializing in clothing catered to young adults. Soon thereafter the business took off, spawning 100 stores in the region by 1980, at which point Miller sold his company to Amcena Corporation. The new owner continued the store's growth trend, expanding to over 300 storefronts across California, Arizona, Nevada, New Mexico, Texas and other states by the end of the 1980s.

== Later years ==
In Summer 2001, the company changed its name to Anchor Blue because they had marketed, distributed, and sold their own line of jeans (for both men and women) and other clothing and accessories in their stores but wanted the chain's name to reflect their own name brand. Up until that time, Miller's Outpost (and subsequently Anchor Blue Clothing Company) were also selling brand names from some of their competitors in the apparel industry. Levi's, Menace, Mecca, and other name brands were also sold but later dropped when Anchor Blue decided to exclusively sell its own Anchor Blue fashion line. During the years that it was known as Miller's Outpost, the retail chain marketed and sold their own urbanwear line, Steel Wing, and their own activewear line. Those two lines have been discontinued.

Most of the Anchor Blue stores were located in enclosed shopping centers.

The company was owned by an affiliate of Sun Capital Partners, a Florida-based investment firm.

== Bankruptcy ==
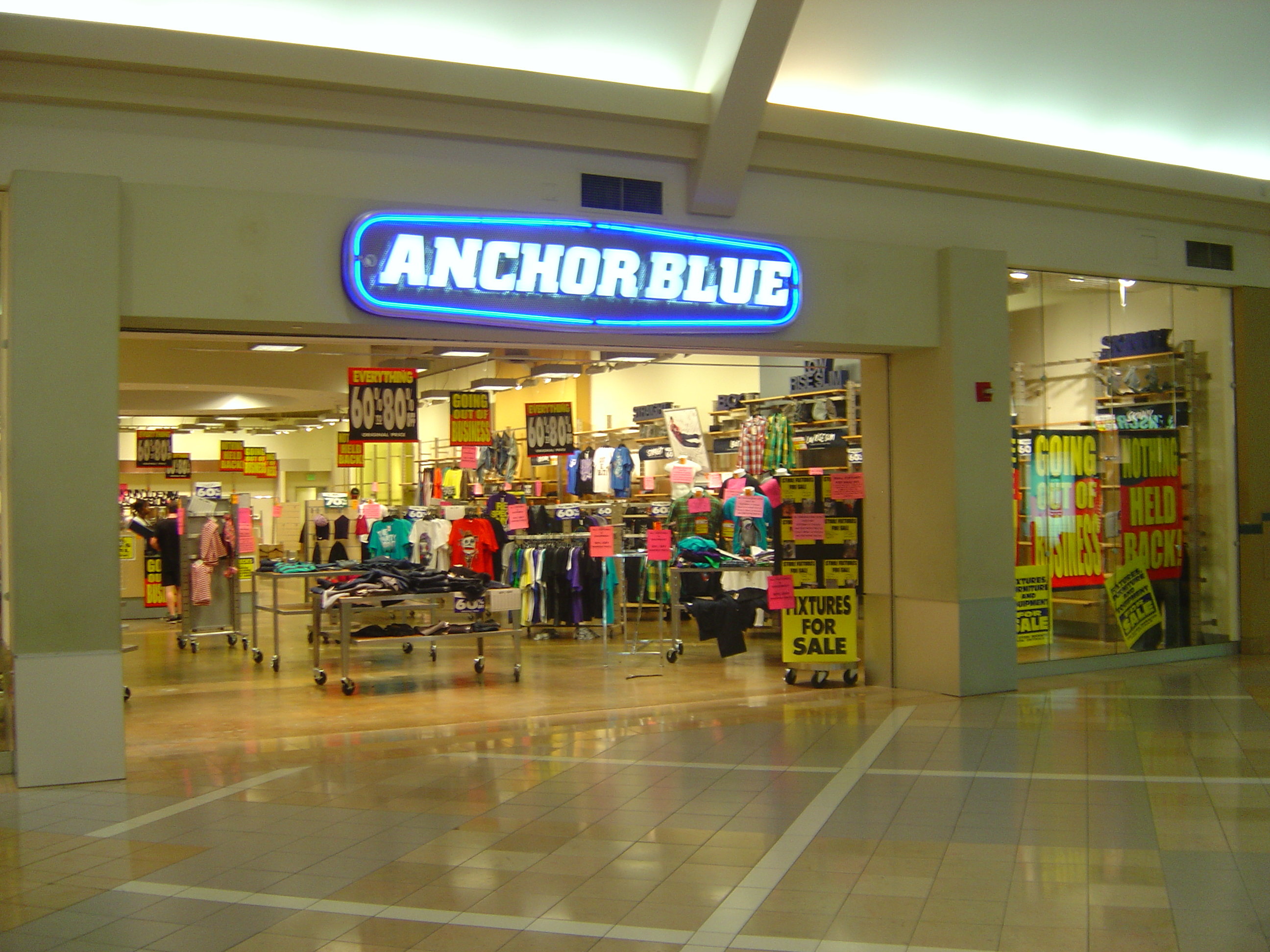
An Anchor Blue store conducting a liquidation sale in 2011.

Anchor Blue went through Chapter 11 bankruptcy in June 2009. During this process they closed over 50 stores, including all their stores in Florida and Georgia. They also sold their sister brand, Levi/Dockers Outlet by Most to Levi's Inc. In August 2010, the company opened its online site for customers to make purchases, after a more than 3-year delay due to poor sales performance.

In January 2011, Anchor Blue ceased corporate operations.

From thereon out, Anchor Blue advertised their "Going Out of Business" sales. They tried to sell their products, including store fixtures with discounts up to 70%. In 2011, Anchor Blue officially closed all stores due to economic struggles.
