= Vera Neumann =

American artist and entrepreneur

- Born: Vera Salaff; July 24, 1907; Stamford, Connecticut, U.S.
- Died: June 15, 1993 (aged 85); North Tarrytown, New York, U.S.
- Occupations: Artist; entrepreneur
- Website: veraneumann.com

Vera Neumann (born Vera Salaff; July 24, 1907 – June 15, 1993) was an American artist and entrepreneur best known for her boldly colored linen patterns and scarves signed "Vera" and featuring a ladybug.

== Early life and career ==
Vera was born July 24, 1907, in Stamford, Connecticut and was the third of four children born to Fanny and Meyer Salaff. Her parents encouraged each of their children to find a passion and follow it – in Vera's case, the passions were drawing and painting. Her father gave her 25 cents if she did a portfolio of paintings as well as taking her to the Metropolitan Museum of Art every Sunday. Ultimately, each of the Salaff children chose a creative career path. After high school, Vera attended art school at the Cooper Union for the Advancement of Science and Art and enrolled in classes at the Traphagen School of Fashion after graduation. She graduated from Traphagen School of Fashion in 1926 in Illustration and Textile Design.

== Career ==
Her first job was as a fashion illustrator and then a textile designer on Seventh Avenue in New York. Shortly afterwards, she left to design fabric and murals for children's rooms.

Vera met and married Austrian George Neumann whose family background was in textiles. The two moved into a small studio on 17th street where they decided to merge their career backgrounds and began their company, Printex. They built a small silkscreen printing press to fit on their dining room table which was only large enough to produce linen placemats. These were then cured in their kitchen oven.

They were soon joined by their friend Frederick Werner Hamm, a recent German immigrant who also had a background in textiles. Hamm used his sales skills to secure their first order from the department store B. Altman. The company outgrew the apartment and moved into a larger one, which soon became too small, so they moved into a large derelict 1810 Georgian Mansion near the Hudson River in Ossining, New York. Walter Erhard worked alongside Vera as designer and art director for over 30 years at Printex, contributing to 50% of the designs that were used.

=== First signature scarf ===
With World War II in full swing, Vera found linen supplies dwindling and went in search of alternative materials for her products. She came across some parachute silk at an army surplus store, an event which marked the beginning of her scarf business. She kept her signature on art transferred to the scarves, thus creating the first signature scarf in history. "Vera scarves" became immediately popular and Vera herself was soon on first-name terms with well-known women around the country. Marilyn Monroe was a fan as were Grace Kelly and First Lady Bess Truman, who selected Vera fabric from Schumacher, Inc. to decorate the third-floor solarium windows and upholstery of the White House. Women from around the country also chose Vera products for their color and cheerful prints.

The demand for Vera products and the untimely death of George in 1962 led Vera to sell the business to Manhattan Industries in 1967. Both Vera and Werner Hamm became board members and Vera stayed on as creative director. The company expanded into sportswear, eventually hiring up and comer Perry Ellis to oversee that division, as well as luggage.

== Galleries and awards ==
Alexander Gray Associates located at 510 West 26th Street, held a Vera Neumann show - Vera Paints a Rainbow, from July 9-August 7, 2015. Emile Walter Galleries, located at 121 East 57th Street, launched an exhibition in 1970, which included around 50 original paintings and drew art collectors from around the country with the first customer John Lennon. Department stores across the country hosted a traveling show of scarves and other products, set up to look like an art gallery. The Smithsonian inducted Vera into its Resident Associate Program in October 1972 as their first artist and commissioned her to paint the Foucault Pendulum, which still hangs in their offices today. The institute launched the program "A Salute to Vera: the Renaissance Woman" at the Museum of History and Technology. In 1975 the Fashion Institute of Technology's Museum launched a retrospective named, "Vera: The Artist in Industry 1945–1975." The Goldie Paley Design Center at the Philadelphia College of Textiles and Science also launched a retrospective of their own in 1980 entitled "Celebrate the Seasons of the Sun With Vera."

== Legacy ==
Neumann's company "Vera Licensing" was purchased by Salant Corporation in 1988. She remained head designer, but Printex was closed later that year. She painted until the last months of her life and died of a cardiac arrest at Phelps Memorial Hospital in North Tarrytown, NY on June 15, 1993. After her death, she continued to receive acclaim from museums and exhibits around the country. In 1999, Vera Licensing was sold to The Tog Shop, a catalog company which had licensed sportswear from Vera Licensing. The Tog Shop was put up for sale in 2005 and Susan Seid, then the VP of Merchandising of The Tog Shop, bought "The Vera Company". In February 2012, Crate & Barrel has exclusively reissued 3 Vera dishtowels.

In April 2013, Target stores began to sell 17 designs inspired by Vera, complete with her signature and ladybug. In November 2013, the business division of the company was acquired by VNIP Holdings, which included licensing agreements, trademarks, and copyrights. However, Seid retained ownership of approximately 8,400 pieces of original artwork, 7,000 acetate and vellum prints, and 4,500 screen-printed posters; thereby splitting the brand from the artwork.

In 2023, Seid established an irrevocable trust and transferred the majority of the original art and screen prints to The Vera Neumann Artwork Trust under her daughter's, Tiffany Salyards, management. Seid kept about 100 original pieces and 300 screen prints for her personal collection and museum endeavors. In December 2023, Salyards, along with her brother Gregory Sharp and his wife Christina Sharp, acquired the licensing agreements, trademarks, copyrights, around 4,300 master silkscreen strike-offs, over 20,000 vintage scarves and samples, and various other vintage marketing materials from VNIP Holdings, effectively reuniting all Vera-related art and brand assets under Salyards' management within Vera Neumann, Inc and the Trust. The Trust operates independently of Vera Neumann, Inc., but both entities collaborate to preserve Vera's artwork and legacy. In 2024, the Trust and Vera Neumann, Inc. began selling Vera's artwork and vintage products directly to consumers and through galleries. Collectively, Salyards manages over 40,000 unique items created by Vera and her related companies.
