= Perry Ellis International =

American fashion company

Perry Ellis International, Inc.
- Type: Privately held company
- Traded as: Nasdaq: PERY
- Industry: Apparel/Accessories
- Founded: 1967
- Founder: George Feldenkreis
- Headquarters: Doral, Florida, United States (Miami, Florida)
- Key people: Oscar Feldenkreis, CEO
- Products: Tops; Bottoms; Swimwear; Fragrances; Accessories
- Revenue: ▲863.87 Million USD (2008)
- Net income: ▼22.41 Million USD (2008) (3.37% profit margin)
- Number of employees: 1,930 (2008)
- Website: www.pery.com www.pei-corporateapparel.com

Perry Ellis International is an American clothing, fashion, cosmetics and beauty company that includes a portfolio of brands distributed through multiple channels worldwide. The company focuses primarily on sportswear and casual clothing for niche markets. It is headquartered in Doral, Florida, United States.

== History ==
Perry Ellis International was founded by George Feldenkreis, who was born in Havana, Cuba, to Russian parents. After moving to Miami in 1961, he founded Supreme International. Throughout the 1970's Supreme began selling through retailers J.C. Penney and Sears and established an international presence. In 1979 Feldenkreis's son, Oscar Feldenkreis, joined as vice president and a board director. In 1993, Supreme International went public on the NASDAQ stock exchange under the symbol SUPI. In the previous year, SUPI recorded $33M in revenues. In 1999, Supreme International acquired Perry Ellis and changed its parent company name to Perry Ellis International with the stock ticker PERY.

Throughout the 2000s, Perry acquired numerous brands and several major Golf brands. Perry now has several major dot com Golf brands and is the licensee for the PGA Tour.

In 2012, the company entered into a collaboration with the New York–based label Duckie Brown to create a menswear line titled Perry Ellis by Duckie Brown.

In 2016, Oscar Feldenkreis became CEO and President. During the COVID-19 pandemic, Perry launched Perry Health with First Responders Children's Foundation,

In 2022 Perry Ellis executive held a panel at the Miami Retail Summit with AI expert Blake Van Leer to discuss innovating online initiatives. Later that year the brand partnered with delivery apps to increase speed, convenience and security for their customers.

== PEI Brands ==
- Anchor Blue
- Axis
- Axist
- Ben Hogan
- C&C California
- Café Luna Collection
- Callaway (licensed)
- Centro
- Chispa
- Cubavera
- Farah
- Girl Star
- Gotcha
- Grand Slam
- Havanera
- Jag
- Jantzen
- John Henry
- Laundry by Shelli Segal
- Manhattan
- MCD
- Miller's Outpost
- Mondo di Marco
- Munsingwear
- Natural Issue
- Nike Swim (licensed)
- Original Khaki Company
- Original Penguin
- Perry Ellis
- PGA Champions
- PGA Tour
- Pro Player
- Rafaella
- Redsand
- SAVANE
- Solero
- Southern Proper
- Tahoe River Outfitters
- Tricots St. Raphael

== Current Licenses ==
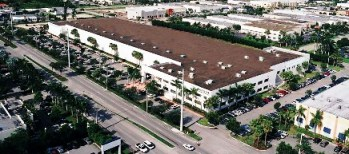
Perry Ellis global headquarters in Miami, Florida.

July 1, 2005: Weeplay LLC will extend the popular Original Penguin brand to newborn, infant, and toddler sizes.

July 21, 2005: Lupo International for the manufacture and distribution in the United States and Canada of Mondo di Marco men's dress and casual shoes.

July 22, 2005: South Pacific Apparel Pty Ltd. for the manufacture and distribution of Savane and Farah men's and boy's dress and casual trousers and shorts in Australia, New Zealand, and other South Pacific islands. On this day, PEI also went into agreement with Cardinal Clothing Canada, Inc. for the manufacture and domestic distribution of Perry Ellis and Perry Ellis Portfolio men's topcoats.

April 2006: Levi Strauss & Co. for the manufacture and distribution of Dockers men's cloth outerwear in the United States and Mexico.

May 22, 2006: JAG Licensing LLC entered into a license agreement to manufacture and distribute JAG men's and women's swimwear and cover-ups in the United States, Canada and Mexico.

January 2007: Falic Fashion Group, LLC, a wholly owned subsidiary of Duty-Free Americas, Inc. As part of the transaction, Falic Fashion Group agreed to purchase all rights, titles, interests, certain intangible assets, and inventory of the fragrance business in a cash transaction of approximately $63 million.

== Executives ==
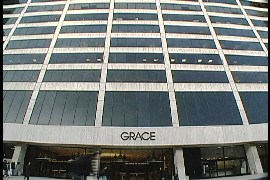
New York Grace Building

- George Feldenkreis: chairman of the board and CEO
- Oscar Feldenkreis: Vice-chairman, President, and COO

== See also ==
- Fashion in the United States
- Perry Ellis
- Perry Ellis (brand)
