= Evergreen Memorial Park (Portsmouth, Virginia) =

Cemetery

- Interactive map of Evergreen Memorial Park

Details
- Location: Portsmouth, Virginia
- Country: United States
- Coordinates: 36°50′07″N 76°20′34″W
- Type: private
- Find a Grave: Evergreen Memorial Park

Evergreen Memorial Park is a cemetery in Portsmouth, Virginia, United States. The earliest burials date back to 1906.

== Notable interments ==
- David Duffy Barrow (1876–1948), Spanish-American War Medal of Honor recipient
- Perry Ellis (1940–1986), fashion designer

The cemetery contains the war graves of 21 British Commonwealth naval personnel of World War II.
