= Frost Bros. =

Defunct American department store

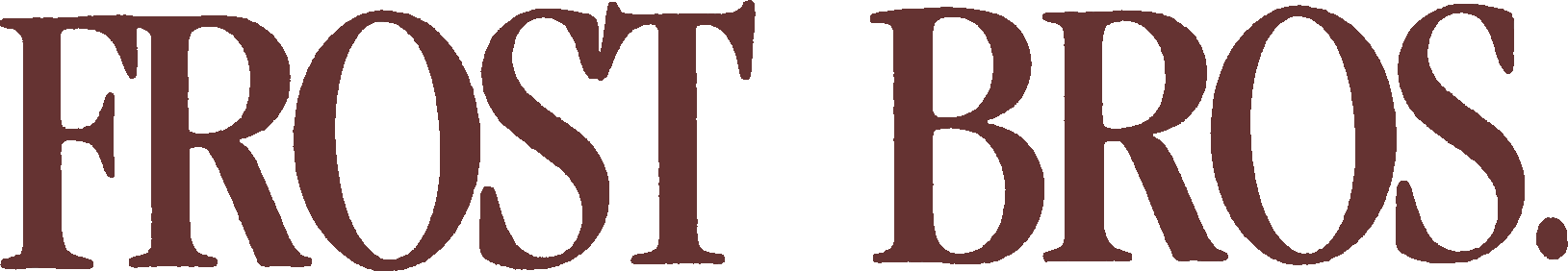
Frost Bros. logo

Frost Bros. was a high-fashion retail chain based in San Antonio, Texas. The retailer opened its first store in 1917 at 217 E. Houston Street in Downtown San Antonio. Frost Bros. was known for quality personal service, including name recognition, purchase preferences, and personal shoppers. Their customer service was on the same level as Neiman Marcus, Saks Fifth Avenue, and Nordstrom. Frost Bros. filed for bankruptcy protection in April 1988, and its four remaining stores were liquidated in mid-1989 after the company failed to successfully reorganize.

== History ==
Founders in 1917

Frost Brothers Company, San Antonio, was chartered in June 30, 1917, with capital of $20,000. The incorporators were Jonas Martin Frost Sr. (1888–1945), William Cohen Frost (1884–1942), and Harry Hertzberg (1883–1940).

1960–1989

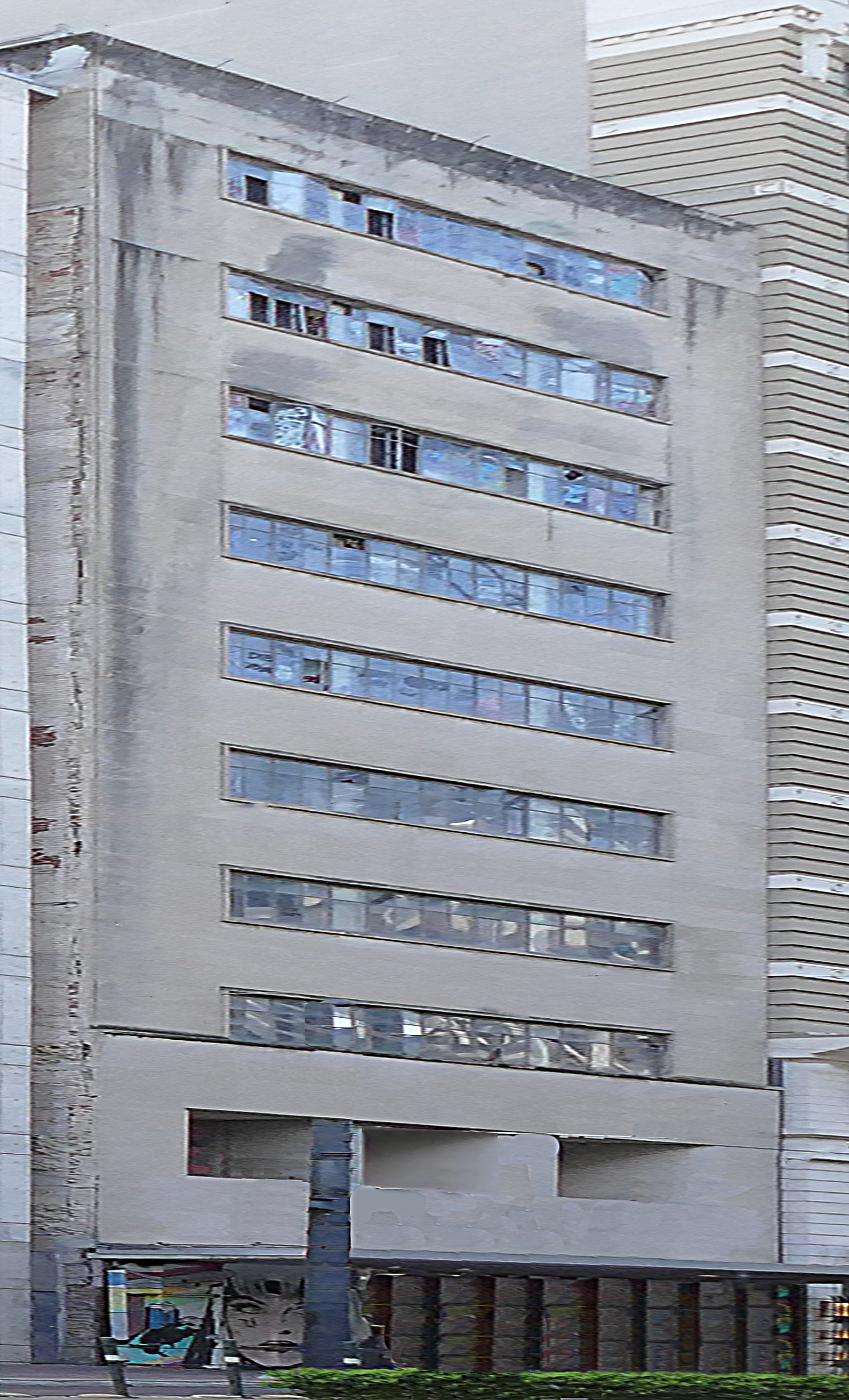
Once a gleaming skyscraper in downtown Houston, now (2021) Battelstein's has been abandoned for 18 years.

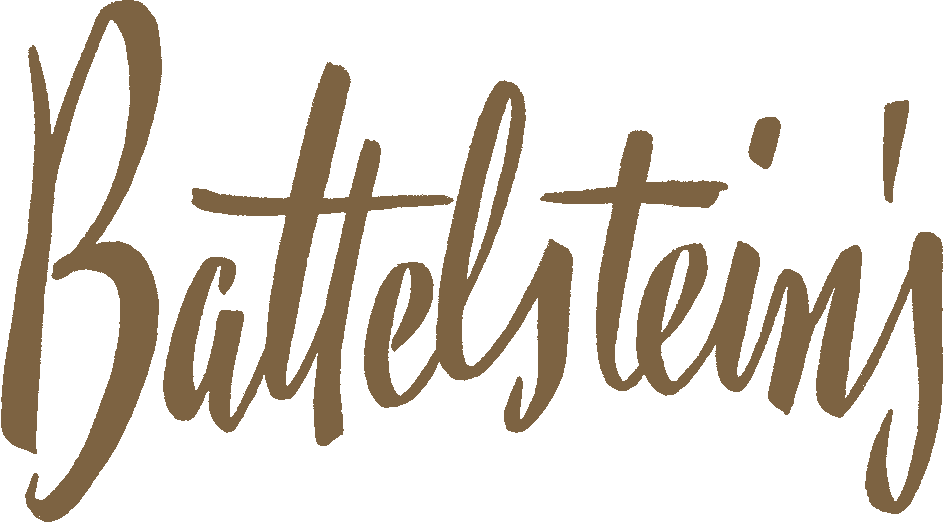
Battelstein's a Houston department store was converted to Frost Bros. shortly after acquisition

Irving Mathews was Frost's chief executive officer from 1960 through 1986. Manhattan Industries acquired the specialty chain in 1970. Manhattan Industries would merge upscale Houston department store Battelstein's under the Frost Bros. name. In 1972, Manhattan Industries would acquire Lichtenstein's department store in Corpus Christi and begin operating the location as Frost Bros. beginning in 1977. In 1980, it was acquired for $27.2 million by the Garfinckel, Brooks Brothers, Miller & Rhoads, Inc. retail conglomerate. By 1986, Frost Bros. operated 12 locations in Texas and a Gucci boutique at Copley Plaza in Boston. Murry Berkowitz, as merchandise manager / buyer and leader, was responsible for the unique product selection and individual employee growth which made this store unique within North America.

The specialty retail chain was purchased by Dallas businessman Sam Wyly and his wife, Torie Steele Wyly, from Manhattan Industries in 1986. Sam Wyly named Joel Edward Rath (born 1938), a top executive at Neiman Marcus, to the position of president and chief executive officer of Frost Bros. shortly after completing the purchase.

Frost Bros. acquired Delman Shoe Salons in June 1987 and operated Delman as a division of Frost Bros.

In 1988 Don Morris was named chairman and chief executive officer of Frost Bros. Larry Gore, president of Delman, assumed the additional responsibilities of president of Frost Bros. Morris and Gore succeeded Joel E. Rath, who resigned as president and chief executive officer of Frost Bros. Wyly, the chairman of Frost Bros., remained the majority stockholder.

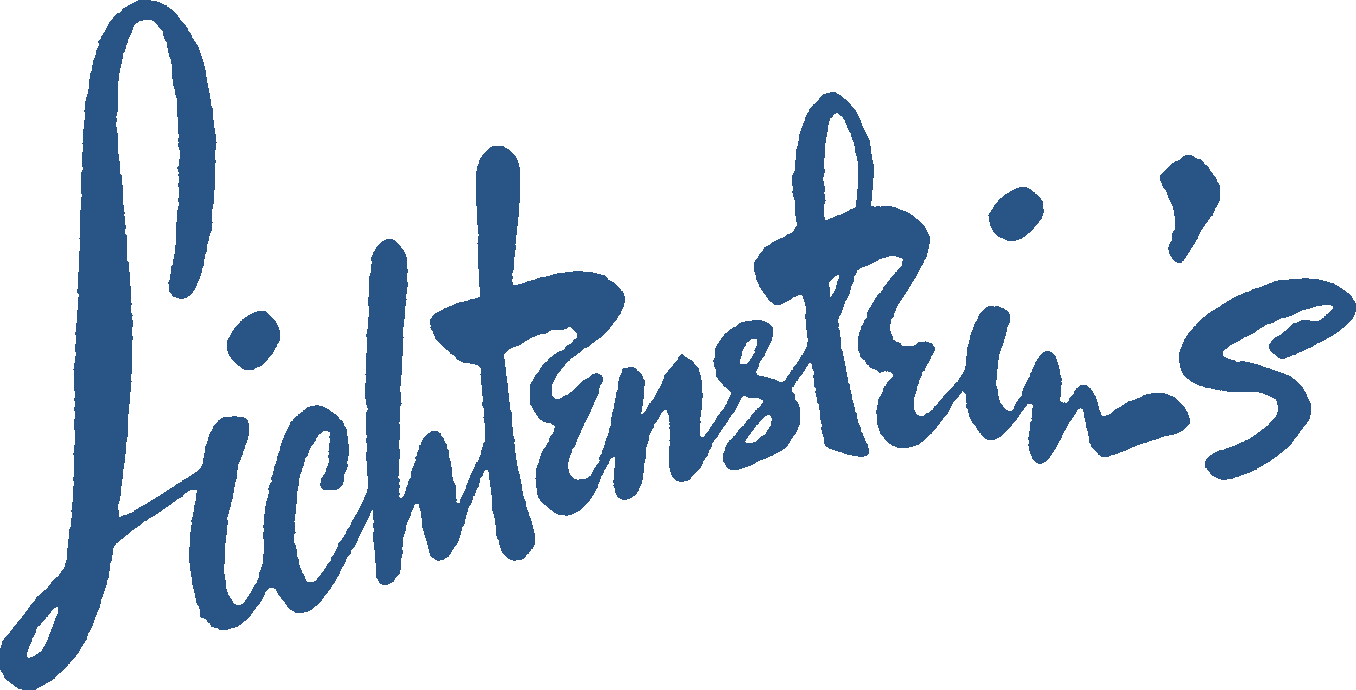
Lichtenstein's a Corpus Christi department store was also converted to Frost Bros. after acquisition

After failing to reorganize while operating under bankruptcy protection, Frost Bros. was liquidated in mid-1989.

== Personnel ==
Founders

- Jonas Martin Frost Sr. (1888–1945)
- William Cohen Frost (1884–1942)
- Harry Hertzberg (1883–1940)

Executives

- Gilbert Lang, elected president of Frost Bros. in 1962
- Sidney Berkowitz, worked at Frost for 17 years (left in 1947); in 1950, he became executive director of Neiman-Marcus' office in New York
- Murray Berkowitz
- Richard Frontman, former dress-designer who became president
- Irving Allen Mathews (1917–1994), buyer, store president, director; 1945 to 1988
- Eugene Lacritz (1929–2012), senior executive; 1963 to 1988
