= Henry Grethel =

American fashion designer (born 1931)

- Born: November 20, 1931 (age 94); Syracuse, New York, U.S.
- Education: Syracuse University
- Labels: Henry Grethel; John Henry
- Awards: Syracuse University Icon of Style Award, 2009, Membership in the prestigious Council of Fashion Designers of America, Chosen by United States Olympic Committee to design team outfits for the 1992 Team USA

Henry E. Grethel (born November 20, 1931) is an American fashion designer, merchandiser and marketer. He was born in Syracuse, New York, and is known for his American sportswear collections which make use of sophisticated colors and fine fabrics. Since 1978, when his first collection debuted, Grethel has been concerned mainly with the design and manufacture of apparel for both men and women. He also spent many years designing shirts for Lanvin, Pierre Cardin and Christian Dior

In addition to holding executive positions with such major apparel companies as C. F. Hathaway Company, Eagle Shirtmakers, and Manhattan Industries, Grethel originated and developed the John Henry brand of men's and women's wear. He then debuted his own collections for men and women with his trademarks—- Henry Grethel, Equipment by Henry Grethel, Henry Grethel Platinum, and Henry Grethel Studio.

== Early life ==
Henry Grethel was born in 1931 and was youngest of five children. He is the son of Frederick Grethel (1888–1967) of Syracuse and Mary Elizabeth Mellen (1893–1976) of Williamstown, New York. Together, Fred and Mary had five children, in order: Leona Grethel (born 1917), Carolyn Evelyn Grethel (1918–1997), Anna Mae Grethel (born 1921), Frederick W. "Fred" Grethel, Jr. (1923–1944) and Henry E. Grethel (born 1931). Henry was raised on Ross Park on the city's north side. His father, the son of German immigrants, was a "master plumber" and owned his own plumbing shop in Syracuse.

Frederick Grethel Sr. (1888–1967), Henry's father, was the son of Gustave M. Grethel (1849–1916) who was born in April 1849, in Baden Wuerttemberg, Germany. By October 17, 1887, Gustave was a member of the Baker's Union in Syracuse.

When Henry was 12, his older brother, Sergeant Frederick W. Grethel, Jr., 22, a glider pilot during World War II, was killed in action on June 19, 1944, in the American airborne landings in Normandy. He was a member of the U.S. Army, 401st Infantry Regiment, 101st Airborne Division and was awarded the Purple Heart. Fred was buried in Colleville-sur-Mer, France at the Normandy American Cemetery.

Henry graduated from North High School in Syracuse in June 1949. By September 1950, he was a student at Centre College in Danville, Kentucky. He transferred to Syracuse University in September 1951, and attended the College of Business Administration where he was a marketing major. His major topic of study was "sales marketing". He graduated from Syracuse University in June 1954, at age 22 with a Bachelor of Science degree and was selected as "Outstanding" student in the topic of marketing. The selection was based on his scholastic record as well as his contributions to the college concerning his topic of study.

During his years at Syracuse, Grethel was social chairman of Sigma Chi fraternity, a popular organization on campus, and was treasurer of the American Marketing Association.

He worked during college with a sales job at Wells & Coverly, a stylish men's clothing store located on South Salina Street in Downtown Syracuse, now defunct.

== Fashion career ==
While in college, Grethel interviewed with C. P. Hathaway Company, a designer and manufacturer of men's shirts, however, he accepted a "practical" job with Recordak Corp., subsidiary of Eastman Kodak Co. in New York City where he spent 2½ years "microfilming" records. In 1957 Grethel finally quit his job at Eastman Kodak and accepted a job with Hathaway. The company offices were located in Bridgeport, Connecticut, where he quickly relocated.

His first job at Hathaway concerned sales, however, he soon became Hathaway's chief designer and marketing director.

In 1965 he was promoted to product manager of the Hathaway "Club Line." Soon afterward he was promoted to product manager and stylist for the company's dress shirt division. By 1968, Grethel was appointed to a newly created job at Hathaway, by then a division of Warnaro Inc., as vice-president of merchandising and marketing.

In 1971 Grethel became president of Eagle Shirtmakers. In July 1973, Grethel, age 41, was named president of the Manhattan Shirt Company.

In 1974, he introduced John Henry style shirts and by 1976 autumn the John Henry for women line was initiated.

Grethel's name was seen first with other trade names: Henry Grethel for Lanvin, Henry Grethel for Pierre Cardin. However, In 1978, as president of Manhattan Shirt Company, he started designing using his own name alone, first a men's collection, then women's, sportswear and dress wear.

In 1995, he was president of Henry Grethel Apparel, part of Hartmarx Corp.

By 2005, Grethel was president of HG Design International, Henry Grethel Apparel. The company designs clothing in classic designs.

== 1992 U.S. Olympic Team Designs ==
After viewing some of his sketches, the United States Olympic Committee invited Henry Grethel to design and oversee production of both the winter and summer parade uniforms for Team USA for the 1992 Olympics. Grethel designed separate outfits for the opening ceremonies of the XXV Olympiad winter games in Albertville and the summer games in Barcelona.

Grethel chose colorful shades of berry, frost and cobalt which are stylish versions of red, white and blue trimmed with gold. He participated with the design of overcoats, pants, hand-knit sweaters as well as accessories such as fedoras, leather gloves, boots and stadium scarves. According to Grethel, "My goal was to create clothing of which the athletes and the country could be proud."

To make the summer uniforms feel as cool and comfortable as possible in the Barcelona heat, Grethel selected the lightest cottons and tropical wools, and had the garments cut with a loose, easy fit. The color scheme of the parade uniforms is patriotic, drawing inspiration from American flag colors, but not using the expected hues. "Brighter and more fashionable – the palette of the summer uniforms is cornflower blue, fuchsia and white," Grethel said.

Grethel spent 15 months transforming his ideas from sketches to final design. His first sketches, a cross between a "sophisticated ski ensemble and the flight jackets worn by American astronauts", were rejected.

"They were designed to look very all-American, but the committee feared terrorist attacks," according to Grethel, referring to concern about anti-American sentiment. Grethel then produced an Italian-inspired wardrobe with a palette of cranberry and purple-navy.

The opening parade is the most viewed event of the Games, and the 1992 winter event was viewed by more than 1.5 billion viewers worldwide. An audience of 3.5 billion people were watching when the parade uniforms made their international debut in the summer opening ceremonies in Barcelona during June 1992.

== Awards ==
In 1998, Grethel was presented the Syracuse University Outstanding Alumni Award.

Grethel has received numerous honors for marketing and design, including membership in the prestigious Council of Fashion Designers of America (CFDA), whose membership consists of more than 280 of America's foremost fashion and accessory designers. CFDA membership is by invitation only and includes many prominent designers including Oleg Cassini, Tommy Hilfiger, Calvin Klein, Ralph Lauren and Donna Karan.

He was selected to design the opening ceremony uniforms for Team USA at the Albertville and Barcelona Olympic games. He was awarded the Tiffany trophy from the U.S. Olympic Organizing Committee for his stylish parade uniforms for the Winter Games.

On June 8, 2009, Henry Grethel received the Icon of Style Award from Syracuse University. For Grethel, who has been honored many times during his long career, this was a special award; "There have been only a handful of moments in my career that have touched my heart and for which I am forever grateful: 1) when I first created the John Henry line; 2) when I first designed my own Henry Grethel collection; 3) when I became the first designer to create uniforms for the U.S. Olympic team (and especially seeing the team at opening ceremonies in Barcelona proudly sporting those uniforms); and 4) receiving this Icon of Style award from my alma mater."

== Personal life ==
He was married to Arlene J. Grethel and had five children who were raised in Wilton, Connecticut. The couple divorced in 1983 and he married a second time to Anna Grethel in June, 1984.

Two of his children are also Syracuse University alumni, David Grethel 1982 and Michele Grethel 1988. Son, Todd Grethel was a graduate of Fashion Institute of Technology '83.
