= North Star Mall =

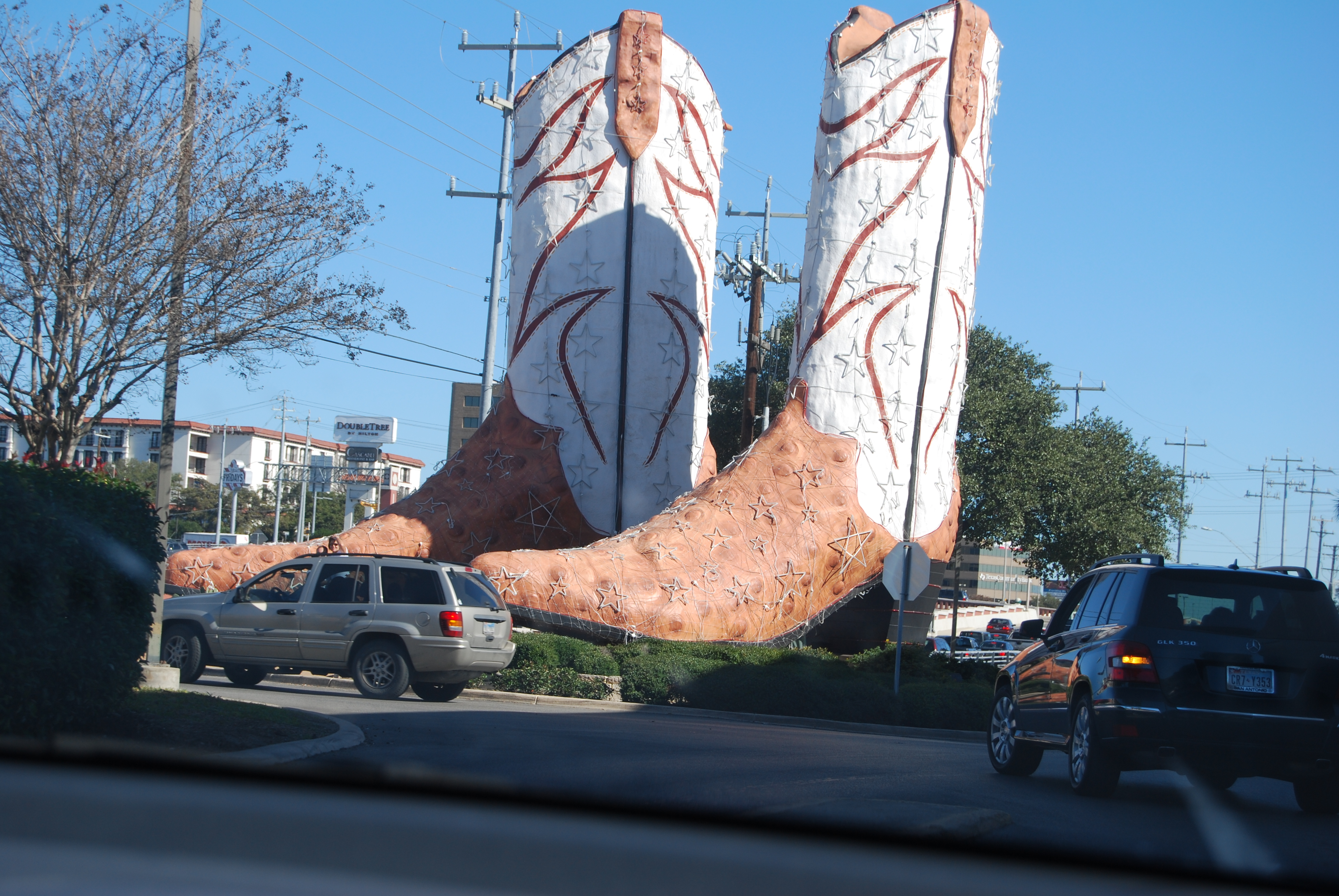
- North Star Mall entrance, with iconic cowboy boots sculpture
- Location: San Antonio, Texas, United States
- Coordinates: 29.5187°N 98.4951°W
- Opened: September 23, 1960; 66 years ago
- Renovated: 2008
- Developer: Community Research & Development, Inc.
- Manager: GGP
- Owner: GGP
- Num. of stores: 175
- Num. of anchor tenants: 6 (5 open, 1 seasonal)
- Floor area: 1,247,553 sq ft (115,901.5 m^{2})
- Floors: 2 (3 in JCPenney and Macy's, 4 in Dillard's)
- Website: www.northstarmall.com

North Star Mall is a shopping mall in San Antonio, Texas, consisting of anchor tenants Dillard's, JCPenney, Macy's, Saks Fifth Avenue, Round One, and Toys "R" Us. It also has over 200 specialty stores, including market-exclusive retailers such as Armani Exchange, Build-A-Bear Workshop, MAC Cosmetics, and Oakley. The mall, which opened in 1960, is located at the intersection of Loop 410 and San Pedro Avenue in the city's Uptown District. It is a well-known city landmark for its Texas-sized cowboy boots, created by Texas artist Bob "Daddy-O" Wade, that are located along its Loop 410 frontage.

== History ==
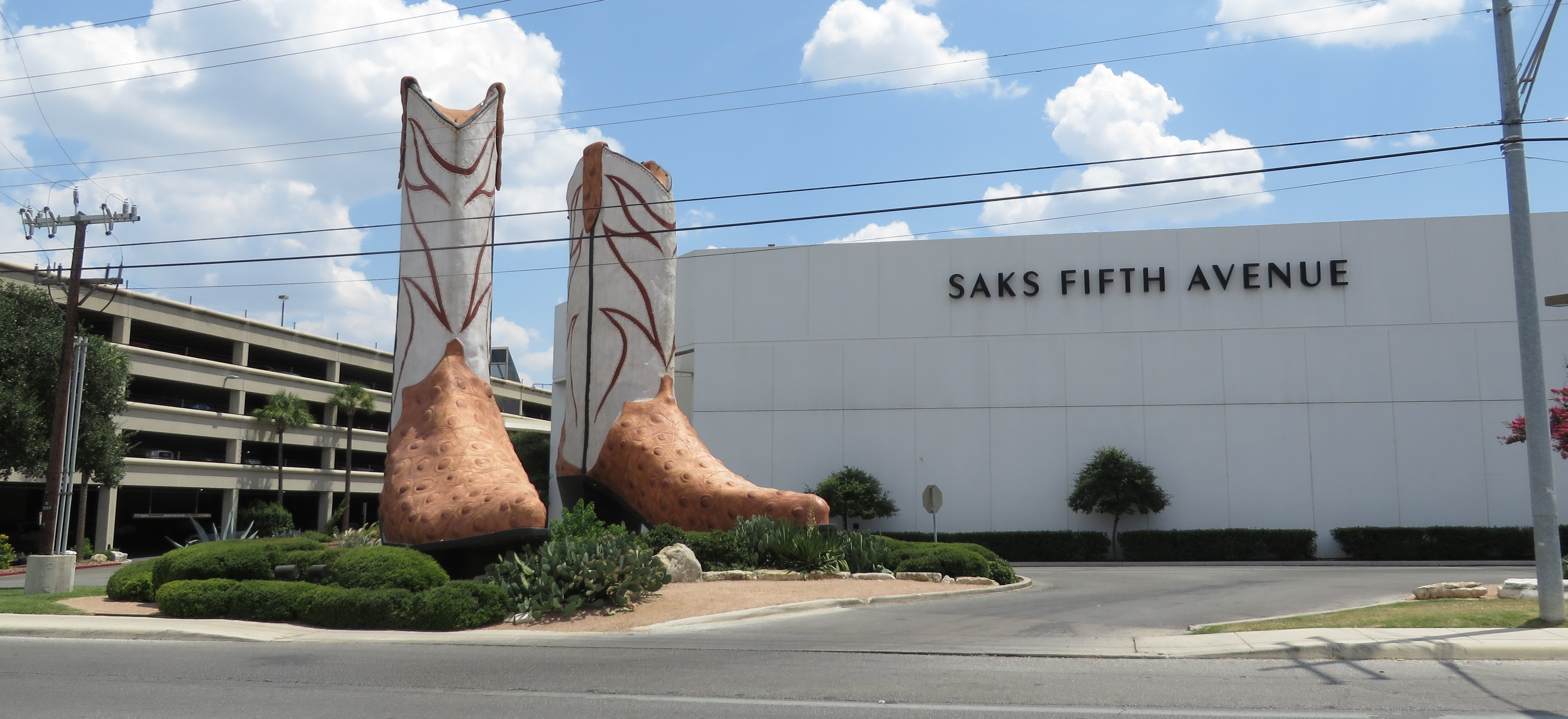
North entrance to mall at former Saks Fifth Avenue location

On September 23, 1960, Community Research and Development Corporation (later to become The Rouse Company) opened the doors to North Star Mall, a new 250,000-square-foot (23,000 m^{2}) fully enclosed shopping center located at the intersection of San Pedro Avenue and Loop 13 (now Interstate 410). The center opens with Wolff and Marx, H-E-B, Walgreens, and 50 other shops, and is the fifth shopping center developed by CRDC. A time capsule scheduled to be opened in 1985 was laid to commemorate the mall's opening.

The mall was expanded in 1963, and new anchor Frost Bros. was opened. A two-screen movie theater was added to the mall in 1964. The mall was expanded again in 1969, and Wolff and Marx relocated into a new four-level building as part of the expansion, and was purchased by and opened as Joske's. A two-level parking deck with a Texaco service station was added south of Joske's.

The Rouse Company sold a 62.5% stake in North Star Mall to Rodamco North America in 1974.

In 1980, a pair of 40-foot (12 m)-tall cowboy boots, a sculpture by the late artist Bob "Daddy-O" Wade entitled 'The Giant Justins' was installed on the I-410 frontage road. The mall promotes the sculpture, created for the Washington Project for the Arts in 1979, as the "world's largest pair of cowboy boots." In 2020, the sculpture remained intact and celebrated the fortieth anniversary of its installation at the mall.

A major renovation of the mall was completed in 1982, adding food and music courts, as well as a Foley's (now Macy's) that was located on the former H-E-B and original Walgreens sites.

A new multi-level parking garage and two-story wing were added to the mall in 1985, along with new anchor Saks Fifth Avenue. North Star Mall celebrated its 25th anniversary, opened the 1960 time capsule, and dedicated a new one that was opened on September 23, 2010.

Two additional multi-level parking garages were opened in 1986, and another two-story wing was added to the mall that includes new food court and a three-level anchor Marshall Field's. Foley's expanded its store to 256,000 square feet (23,800 m^{2}) by extending the store several feet north. Joske's was purchased in 1987 and renamed Dillard's.

Frost Bros. liquidated and closed in 1989. The Gucci boutique previously located there relocated to a new two-level store adjacent to Saks Fifth Avenue.

In 1992, Mervyns opened in the former Frost Bros. location. Marshall Field's withdrew from the Texas market in 1997, and the North Star Mall location was purchased by and converted into Macy's. Saks Fifth Avenue completed a major renovation of its existing store and also opened a new men's store in a space leased from the mall adjacent to the existing store.

The Rouse Company sold an additional stake in North Star Mall to Rodamco in 2000, leaving Rouse with less than 5% ownership of the property.

The Cheesecake Factory would open inside the mall in 2002.

The Rouse Company repurchased North Star Mall (and several other properties) from Rodamco North America in 2002, reassuming ownership.

The Rouse Company began a multi-year, multimillion-dollar renovation in 2004. The renovation was planned to be the most extensive renovation the mall has seen in its history.

General Growth Properties purchased The Rouse Company and became the owner of the mall. The scheduled renovation of the mall was postponed as a result of the transaction.

In 2005, as a result of the Federated Department Stores/May Department Stores transaction, Macy's announced it would close its 178,000-square-foot (16,500 m^{2}) three-level store in 2006 and rebrand the 250,000-square-foot (23,000 m^{2}) Foley's store as Macy's.

In 2006, General Growth Properties purchased the Macy's location from Federated. Mall officials announced that JCPenney would open a store in the former Macy's/Marshall Field's location in summer 2007. A multimillion-dollar renovation, planned since 1999 but stalled due to the 2004 ownership change, finally resumed. Renovations included the mall's interior and exterior, including the addition of ten-foot letters outside the mall spelling out "North Star." As part of the Federated/May merger, Macy's was closed and Foley's was renamed Macy's. The former Foley's location becomes Macy's San Antonio flagship store.

JCPenney opened on August 2, 2007. In 2008 California-based Mervyns announced on August 13 that it would pull out of the San Antonio market stores by November 2008. The new Apple Store opened in 2008.

In 2010, North Star Mall celebrated its 50th anniversary and opened the 1985 time capsule. The same year, Forever 21 relocated its existing store into a portion of the former Mervyns location, and a Michael Kors store opened by the start of the holiday shopping season.

On December 16, 2021, Round1 announced that a North Star Mall location was planned to open in the third quarter of 2023.On March 4, 2023, Round1 opened its doors on the former upper level of Mervyns.

In May of 2025 Forever 21 closed all remaining retail locations and ceased operations.

On March 6, 2026, Saks Global, as part of a bankruptcy restructuring, announced the closure of Saks Fifth Avenue at North Star Mall.

=== Previous anchors ===
Previous anchors include Wolff and Marx, Frost Bros. (Mervyns, Forever 21 (partial, vacant), currently Round1 (partial)), Marshall Field's (Macy's, currently JCPenney), Foley's (currently Macy's), and Joske's (currently Dillard’s), Saks Fifth Avenue (vacant)

=== Additional information ===
There was an underground arcade called the music court. Added in 1982 near the north entry between the space now occupied by JCPenney and the former Saks Fifth Avenue, it was accessible only by escalator. In the early 1980s, the arcade's tenants included Expensive Toys for Big Boys, a record store, and a music store. The space eventually became a sports goods store and is currently not accessible to the public.

The parking garage added in the mid-1980s between Saks and Dillard's displaced the mall's movie theater complex. The Texaco fuel station located in the mall's original underground garage (at the corner of Rector and McCullough) was also closed during the 1980s renovations.

The North Star Transit Center, operated by VIA Metropolitan Transit, is located adjacent to the mall's northwest corner
