= Manhattan Industries =

American shirt company

- Formerly: Manhattan Shirt Company (1857-?)
- Industry: Garments
- Founded: 1857; 169 years ago
- Founder: Lewis Levi
- Defunct: 1986
- Fate: Acquired by Salant Corporation
- Products: Shirts
- Brands: Henry Grethel; The Vera Companies; John Henry; Perry Ellis; Lady Manhattan; Frost Bros.

Manhattan Industries was founded as the Manhattan Shirt Company by Lewis Levi in 1857. His son Abram Leeds took over and grew the company to be one of the largest shirt producers. Brands under the company included Henry Grethel, The Vera Companies, John Henry, Perry Ellis, Lady Manhattan, the Union Company specialty stores in Ohio, and Frost Bros. specialty stores in Texas..

The company incorporated in 1912. It had garment factories employing mostly women in several states. Operations included a factory complex in Paterson, New Jersey. Manhattan Shirt Company was one of the initial tenants in the Emmet Building on Madison Avenue in Manhattan.

Robert Lewis Leeds Jr. was the CEO of Manhattan Industries from 1965 to 1974, when he left to work with Victor Kiam at Remington. Larry Leeds, the president and chairman of the company in 1977, backed the creation of Perry Ellis International.

In 1980, Frost Bros. was sold to Washington, D.C.-based Julius Garfinkle Company, and The Union Company to Marshall Field & Company of Chicago, which merged the Ohio stores into the Cleveland-based Halle Brothers chain.

The company was acquired by Salant Corporation, after that company emerged from Chapter 11 bankruptcy proceedings, in an unsolicited hostile takeover for $100 million in 1988, after the Manhattan board initially rejected the offer.

== See also ==
- William Openhym & Sons
