= Subway shirt =

Type of female clothing

A subway shirt, or outfit dampener, is an oversized outfit worn by women to protect themselves while they commute on hot days. This dress style is meant to protect women from unpleasant looks, sexist remarks, and hostile or violent confrontations. This strategy is used by women in the U.S., U.K., and France.

== Background ==
The trend of wearing oversized shirts to avoid unwanted male attention on public transportation began in New York City. The movement has gained traction, with videos with the hashtag #SubwayShirt attracting millions of views.

In the UK, 71% of women have encountered some type of sexual harassment in public places, according to a poll conducted on with the assistance of UN Women UK.

Although the term "subway shirt" is new, choosing outfits to avoid harassment is not. A 2016 study in France, by the National Federation of Transport User Organizations ociations (Fnaut), found that 48% of women respondents acknowledged modifying their clothes in order to move about, such as wearing pants instead of skirt, or covering their cleavage with a scarf or a large sweater.

== Comments ==
According to some TikTok users, the cover-up is intended to redirect attention away from the body. According to Leora Tanenbaum, the TikToks suggesting subway T-shirts are promoting awareness of the harm that results from assault and sexual harassment in public places. While wearing one may make women feel less exposed, Tanenbaum states that it isn't a requirement.

This wearing style has been described by certain TikTok users as "Fashion safety layer" and "sad but necessary". Others stated they follow the style while utilizing ride-hailing services like Uber or Lyft.

== See also ==
- Modest clothing
- Women-only passenger car
- Chikan
