= Kappa Gamma Psi =

American performing arts fraternity

- ΚΓΨ
- Founded: December 11, 1913; 112 years ago New England Conservatory of Music
- Type: Professional
- Affiliation: Independent
- Status: Defunct
- Defunct date: 2008
- Emphasis: Music Performance
- Scope: National
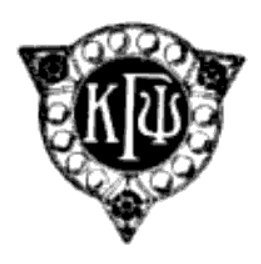
- Member badge
- Colors: Gray and Black
- Jewel: Pearl and Amethyst
- Publication: Gray and Black
- Chapters: 13 (all inactive)
- Headquarters: United States

Kappa Gamma Psi (ΚΓΨ) was an American music fraternity founded in 1913 at the New England Conservatory. Its last surviving collegiate chapter went inactive in 2008 but continues to have alumni chapters.

== History ==
Kappa Gamma Psi was founded by twelve men who were members of a men's club at the New England Conservatory of Music in Boston, Massachusetts on December 11, 1913. It was a performing arts fraternity for male students.

Its second chapter, Beta, was established at the University of Michigan in 1916. World War I slowed the fraternity's expansion and resulted in Beta going inactive. Its first post-war chapter was Gamma at the Boston Conservatory of Music in 1923. By 1927, it had chartered five chapters in the United States and had initiated 235 members.

The fraternity expanded to have thirteen chapters at schools of music or universities with a department of music. It was overseen by a board of national officers that met at an annual national convention.

By 1976, the only active chapter was Iota at Ithaca College. In the 1980s, it changed from a musical fraternity to a performing arts fraternity. Iota went inactive in 2008. As of 2024, the organization still has one active alumni chapter.

== Symbols ==
Kappa Gamma Psi's badge was a circle of twelve pearls over an inverted triangle. Inside the circle were the Greek letters ΚΓΨ. There was an amethyst at the three points of the triangle.

Its jewels were the amethyst and the pearl. Its colors were gray and black. The fraternity's publication was the Gray and Black.

== Membership ==
Membership was limited to music students. The fraternity also initiated honorary members. The fraternity was originally all male but became coeducational in the 1970s.

== Activities ==
Kappa Gamma Psi's Iota chapter (Ithaca College) formerly sponsored a competition for new compositions. The widely performed band composition "The Leaves Are Falling", by the American composer Warren Benson, was commissioned by Kappa Gamma Psi in 1963. "Deux Preludes", a work for flute, clarinet, and bassoon by the Czech-born composer Karel Husa, was commissioned by the Iota chapter in 1966. Elie Siegmeister's "Sextet for Brass and Percussion" was commissioned in 1966. In 1974, the Iota chapter commissioned Alfred Reed's "Double Wind Quintet".

== Chapters ==
=== Collegiate chapters ===
Following are the former collegiate chapters of Kappa Gamma Psi, with inactive chapters and institutions noted in italics.

Chapter	Charter date and range	Institution	Location	Status	Ref.
Alpha	December 11, 1913 – 1968	New England Conservatory of Music	Boston, Massachusetts	Inactive	(Note: There was no fraternity housing for this chapter, only a chapter room which was taken away in 1968 by the school, and the chapter went inactive.)
Beta	March 21, 1916 – 1919	University of Michigan	Ann Arbor, Michigan	Inactive	(Note: The chapter went inactive due to a lack of members during World War I.)
Gamma	1923–1932; 1948–1976	Boston Conservatory of Music	Boston, Massachusetts	Inactive	
Delta	1924–1956	University of Utah	Salt Lake City, Utah	Inactive	(Note: The chapter's last confirmed existence is from an early 1950s issue of the Gray and Black.)
Epsilon 1	1924–1939	Pennsylvania State University	State College, Pennsylvania	Reassigned	
Zeta	1927–1932	University of Alabama	Tuscaloosa, Alabama	Inactive	
Eta	1927–1939	Louisiana State University	Baton Rouge, Louisiana	Inactive	
Theta	1928–1938	Louisiana Polytechnic Institute	Ruston, Louisiana	Inactive	
Iota	1929–2008	Ithaca College	Ithaca, New York	Inactive	
Kappa	1929–1954	Chicago Musical College	Chicago, Illinois	Moved	(Note: The college closed in 1954 following its purchase by another institution. Kappa chapter members did not wish to move to the distant campus of the acquiring school. The old downtown location provided better playing opportunities for young musicians, so some Kappa members transferred to DePaul University and started the Mu chapter.)
Lambda	1933–1939	Cincinnati School of Music	Cincinnati, Ohio	Inactive	
Epsilon 2	1950–1973	Boston University	Boston, Massachusetts	Inactive	
Mu	1954–1956	DePaul University	Cincinnati, Ohio	Inactive	(Note: Chapter was started by former members of the Kappa chapter who transferred to DePaul University following the closure of their old school.)

=== Alumni chapters ===
Following is a list of Kappa Gamma Psi alumni chapters, with active chapters in bold and inactive chapters in italics.

Chapter	Charter date and range	Location	Status	Ref.
**Boston Area**	2009	Boston, Massachusetts	Active	

== Notable members ==
- Halim El-Dabh, composer
- Bert Remsen, actor

=== Notable honorary members ===
- Harold Bauer, pianist and violinist
- Pablo Casals, cellist and conductor
- Philip Greeley Clapp, director of the School of Music at the University of Iowa, conductor, and composer
- Frank Battisti, judge
- George Eastman, entrepreneur, inventor, and photographer
- Duke Ellington, jazz pianist and composer
- Ossip Gabrilowitsch, pianist and conductor
- Philip Hale, music critic
- Louis Hasselmans, conductor and cellist
- Hans Kindler, cellist and conductor
- Fritz Kreisler, violinist and composer
- Erich Leinsdorf, conductor
- Georges Longy, oboist, conductor, composer, and founder of Longy School of Music
- Ignacy Jan Paderewski, pianist, composer, intellectual and statesman
- Jesús María Sanromá, musician
- Elie Siegmeister, composer
- Lawrence Tibbett, opera singer
- Bruno Walter, conductor, pianist, and composer
