= Original Penguin =

American clothing line

- Type: Subsidiary
- Industry: Apparel
- Founded: 1955
- Headquarters: New York City, U.S.
- Revenue: ▲US$50 million (2007)
- Parent: Perry Ellis International
- Website: originalpenguin.com

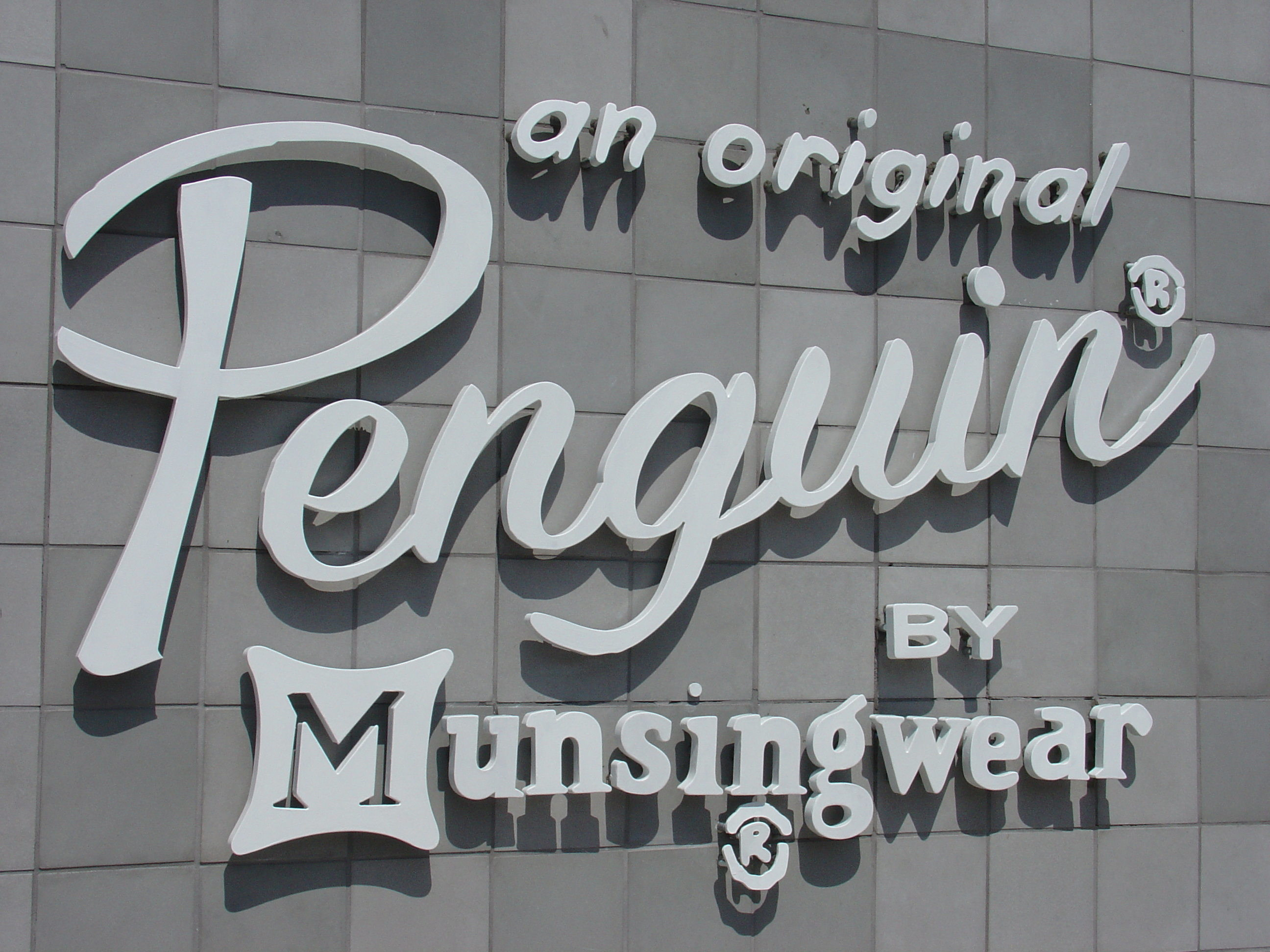
Los Angeles Penguin store facade

Original Penguin (also known simply as Penguin) is an American clothing line owned by Perry Ellis International. The brand specializes in clothing, footwear, and eyewear. It is sold in North America, South America, Central America, Europe and Asia-Pacific (Philippines). It has stores in five states in the US.

== History ==
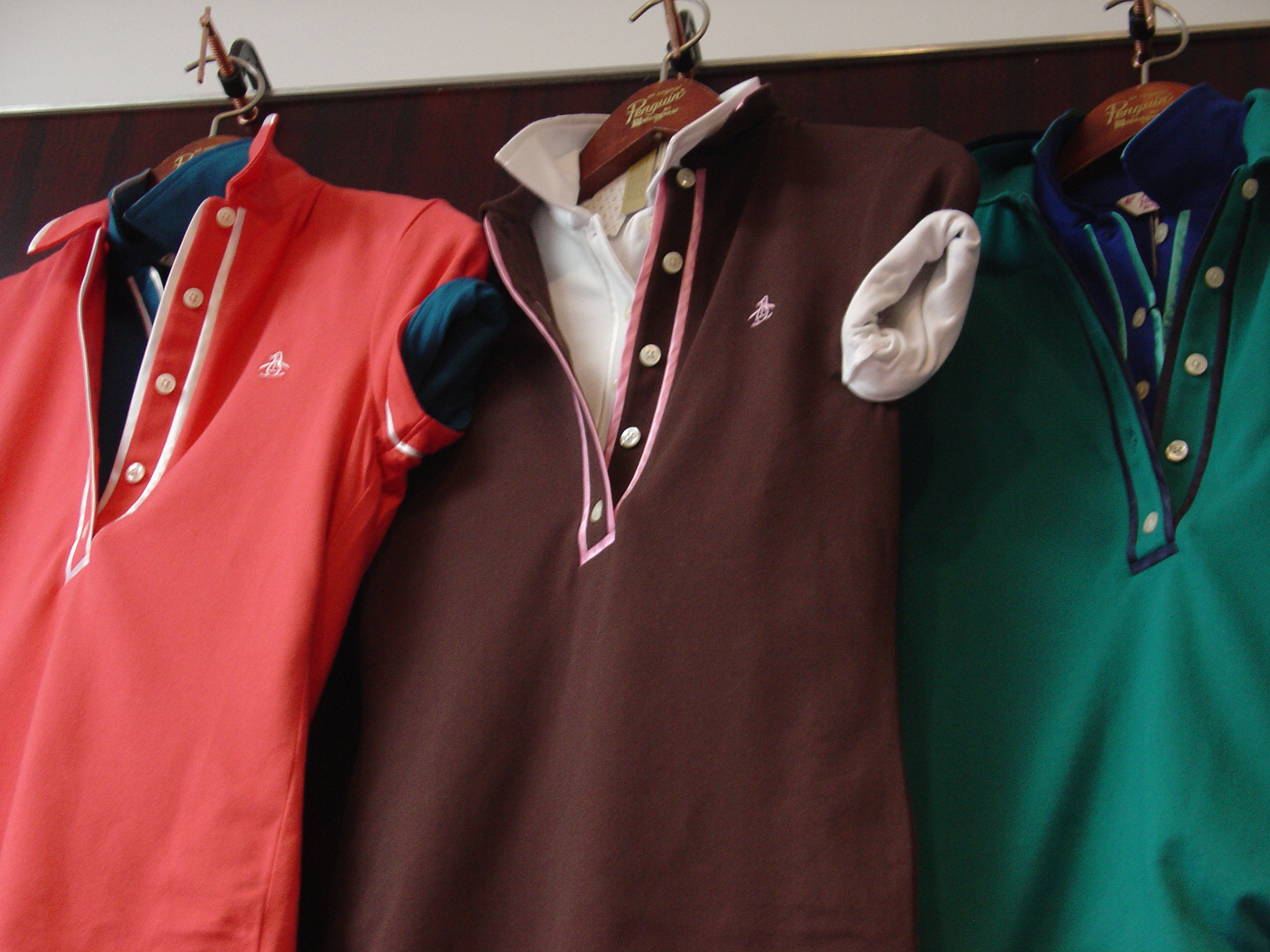
Women's Penguin shirts

The brand was introduced in 1955 by Munsingwear, a Minneapolis-based underwear and military garment manufacturer, when it launched the Original Penguin golf shirt in the United States. Munsingwear was for many years famous for its union suits, an undergarment consisting of an undershirt and underdrawers combined in a single garment. The company was also said to be the originator of the classic golf shirt. In 1996, the brand was bought by Perry Ellis International after Munsingwear filed for bankruptcy in 1991.
