= Poteet =

Poteet may refer to:

- Poteet, Texas, a city in Atascosa County
  - Poteet High School (Poteet, Texas), located here
  - Poteet Independent School District, located here
- Poteet (surname), includes a list of notable people with this surname
- Poteet High School (Mesquite, Texas)

== See also ==
- Poteat (disambiguation)
