= Ditto, Texas =

- Ghost town
- Location within Texas Location within the United States
- Coordinates: 29°04′53″N 98°36′58″W
- Country: United States
- State: Texas
- County: Atascosa
- Elevation: 532 ft (162 m)
- Time zone: UTC-6 (Central (CST))
  - Summer (DST): UTC-5 (CDT)
- Area code: 830
- GNIS feature ID: 1356049

Ditto is a ghost town in Atascosa County, in the U.S. state of Texas. It is located within the San Antonio metropolitan area.

== Geography ==
Ditto is located on the Atascosa River, 5 mi (8.0 km) northwest of Poteet and 32 mi (51 km) south of San Antonio via Texas State Highway 16 in northwestern Atascosa County.

== Education ==
In 1904, Ditto had two schools. It continues to be served by the Poteet Independent School District to this day.
