= Texas State Highway 173 =

State highway in Texas

State Highway 173
- 173rd Airborne Brigade Memorial Highway
- SH 173, highlighted in red

Route information
- Maintained by TxDOT
- Length: 97.34 mi (Note: Certified mileage does not include concurrency with SH 16 in Bandera.) (156.65 km)
- Existed: 1932–present

Major junctions
- South end: SH 16 near Jourdanton
- I-35 in Devine; US 90 near Hondo; SH 16 in Bandera
- North end: SH 16 in Kerrville

Location
- Country: United States
- State: Texas
- Counties: Atascosa, Frio, Medina, Bandera, Kerr

Highway system
- Highways in Texas; Interstate; US; State; Former; Toll; Loops; Spurs; FM/RM; Park; Rec
← SH 172	→ SH 174

State Highway 173 (SH 173) is a state highway that runs for 97.9 miles (157.6 km) from Jourdanton to Kerrville in south Texas, traversing through the Texas Hill Country.

== History ==
The highway was originally designated on August 4, 1932 from Hondo southeast to Devine. On October 26, 1932, it was extended southeast to Pleasanton. On January 11, 1933, it was rerouted to end in Jourdanton. On October 16, 1933, this section from Devine to Jourdanton was cancelled. On May 14, 1935, it was extended back to Jourdanton. On July 15, 1935, SH 173 was cancelled (as it was not built yet). On September 3, 1935, a road from Devine to Jourdanton was being investigated for preparation for restoration of this section of SH 173. On April 20, 1936, the entire route was restored. On September 26, 1939, the designated route was extended south from Jourdanton through Freer, absorbing most of SH 241, with an expected terminus at Hebbronville. On January 29, 1942, the section from Freer to Hebbronville had been cancelled as it was deemed too expensive. On August 31, 1965, the section south of Jourdanton was transferred to SH 16. On February 21, 1972, SH 173 was signed, but not designated along FM 689 to Kerrville. On October 23, 1978, the section west of Loop 534 was transferred to Loop 534, but still signed as SH 173. On August 29, 1990, the route was extended northward to Kerrville, replacing FM 689.

== Route description ==
SH 173 begins at SH 16 just north of Jourdanton. SH 173 runs northwest toward Devine where it intersects I-35 in the south part of town. Leaving Devine, 173 turns running in a sharper northwest direction. Just east of Hondo, the highway interchanges with US 90. The highway turns to run in a more north–south direction, twisting and turning many times through canyons. SH 173 enters Bandera and intersects SH 16 for a second time. The two highways share a short overlap before splitting. Here, signs are posted advising trucks and through traffic to use SH 173 as a route to Kerrville instead of SH 16, as SH 173 is a shorter and faster route, while SH 16 traverses a hill with many sharp curves. SH 173 intersects SH 16 for a third time in Kerrville, where the highway ends.

== Junction list ==
County	Location	mi	km	Destinations	Notes
Atascosa	Jourdanton	0.0	0.0	SH 16	Southern terminus of SH 173
Atascosa		6.0	9.7	FM 2146 north to FM 476	South end of FM 2146 overlap
Atascosa		6.3	10.1	FM 2146 south to FM 1333	North end of FM 2146 overlap
Atascosa		9.8	15.8	FM 1333 – Charlotte	
Atascosa		15.2	24.5	FM 2504 north – Rossville	Southern terminus of FM 2504
Frio	Bigfoot	21.5	34.6	FM 472 south – Bigfoot	
Medina	Devine	24.9	40.1	I-35 – Moore, Natalia	I-35 exit 122.
Medina	Devine	25.7	41.4	FM 3176 south to FM 462	Northern terminus of FM 3176
Medina	Devine	25.8	41.5	SH 132 – Pearsall	
Medina	Devine	26.6	42.8	FM 2200 north – Yancey	Eastern terminus of FM 2200
Medina		30.7	49.4	FM 1343 north – Castroville	Southern terminus of FM 1343
Medina		45.7	73.5	US 90 – Hondo, San Antonio	Interchange
Medina		45.8	73.7	18th Street	Interchange
Medina		47.0	75.6	FM 2676 east – Quihi, Rio Medina	Western terminus of FM 2676
Bandera		72.9	117.3	RM 1077 west – Hill Country State Natural Area	
Bandera	Bandera	73.3	118.0	SH 16 south – San Antonio	South end of SH 16 overlap
Bandera	Bandera	73.8	118.8	SH 16 north (Main Street) – Medina	North end of SH 16 overlap
Bandera		74.3	119.6	FM 3240 west	Eastern terminus of FM 3240
Bandera		84.0	135.2	RM 2828 west – Medina	Eastern terminus of RM 2828
Kerr	Camp Verde	86.6	139.4	RM 480 north – Center Point	Southern terminus of RM 480
Kerr		92.0	148.1	FM 2771 west (Lower Turtle Creek Road)	Eastern terminus of FM 2771
Kerr	Kerrville	95.8	154.2	Loop 534 north to I-10 / SH 27	Southern terminus of Loop 534
Kerr	Kerrville	97.9	157.6	SH 16 – Medina, Kerrville	Northern terminus of SH 173; access to Peterson Regional Medical Center
1.000 mi = 1.609 km; 1.000 km = 0.621 mi: Concurrency terminus
