= Davis, Texas =

- Unincorporated community
- Location within Texas Location within the United States
- Coordinates: 28°47′59″N 98°45′26″W
- Country: United States
- State: Texas
- County: Atascosa
- Elevation: 443 ft (135 m)
- Time zone: UTC-6 (Central (CST))
  - Summer (DST): UTC-5 (CDT)
- Area code: 830
- GNIS feature ID: 1379640

Davis, also known as Davistown or Davis Switch, is an unincorporated community in Atascosa County, in the U.S. state of Texas. According to the Handbook of Texas, the community had a population of 8 in 2000. It is located within the San Antonio metropolitan area.

== Geography ==
Davis is located along Texas State Highway 97, 8 mi (13 km) southwest of Charlotte in southwestern Atascosa County.

== Education ==
Davis is served by the Charlotte Independent School District.
