= Iuka, Texas =

- Unincorporated community
- Location within Texas Location within the United States
- Coordinates: 29.0458010°N 98.7383568°W
- Country: United States
- State: Texas
- County: Atascosa
- Elevation: 515 ft (157 m)
- Time zone: UTC-6 (Central (CST))
  - Summer (DST): UTC-5 (CDT)
- Area code: 830
- GNIS feature ID: 1379991

Iuka is an unincorporated community in Atascosa County, in the U.S. state of Texas. It is located within the San Antonio metropolitan area.

== History ==
A post office was established at Iuka in 1886 and remained in operation until 1908 and served as the main post office for another unincorporated community named Sand Branch. There are no population estimates available for the community. It had a few gravel pits and several scattered houses in the 1940s, which has since decreased while it was listed on county maps in the late 1980s.

== Geography ==
Iuka is located 10 mi (16 km) west of Poteet in northwestern Atascosa County.

== Education ==
Iuka is served by the Poteet Independent School District.
