= Crown, Texas =

- Unincorporated community
- Location within Texas Location within the United States
- Coordinates: 28°56′29″N 98°44′24″W
- Country: United States
- State: Texas
- County: Atascosa
- Elevation: 538 ft (164 m)
- Time zone: UTC-6 (Central (CST))
  - Summer (DST): UTC-5 (CDT)
- Area code: 830
- GNIS feature ID: 1379615

Crown is an unincorporated community in Atascosa County, in the U.S. state of Texas. According to the Handbook of Texas, the community had a population of 10 in 2000. It is located within the San Antonio metropolitan area.

== Geography ==
Crown is located east of Farm to Market Road 1334, 10 mi (16 km) west of Jourdanton in west-central Atascosa County.

== Education ==
Crown's local school, Lagunillas School, had 54 students enrolled in 1904. It grew to 244 students in 1914 and was renamed Crown School. The school then joined the Charlotte Independent School District in 1933. It continues to be served by Charlotte ISD to this day.
