= Kyote, Texas =

- Unincorporated community
- Location within Texas Location within the United States
- Coordinates: 29°01′36″N 98°47′24″W
- Country: United States
- State: Texas
- County: Atascosa
- Elevation: 594 ft (181 m)

Population (2000)
  - Total: 34
- Time zone: UTC-6 (Central (CST))
  - Summer (DST): UTC-5 (CDT)
- Area code: 830
- GNIS feature ID: 1380044

Kyote is an unincorporated community in Atascosa County, Texas, United States. According to the Handbook of Texas, the community had a population of 34 in 2000. It is located within the San Antonio metropolitan area.

== History ==
The Kyote post office opened in 1927. Postmaster William D. Rogers named it after the area's coyote population. This alternate spelling was chosen due to a similarly named community elsewhere in Texas, although the other place was spelled Cayote. The post office closed in 1935; by this point, the community also had one business and ten residents. The population spiked to fifty in 1951 after oil was discovered nearby. A 1964 county highway map showed a few scattered houses at the northern edge of the oilfield, but in 1984, it was still listed on county maps, but there were no buildings at the site. Its population stabilized at around twenty-five from the 1960s through the 1990s and was reported as thirty-four in 2000.

== Geography ==
Kyote is located at the intersection of Texas State Highway 173 and Farm to Market Road 2504 in the western part of the county, near the Frio County line.

== Education ==
Kyote had its own school in 1935. Today, the community is served by the Poteet Independent School District.
