= Fashing, Texas =

Unincorporated community in Atascosa County, Texas, United States

- Unincorporated community
- Location within Texas Location within the United States
- Coordinates: 28°47′33″N 98°08′23″W
- Country: United States
- State: Texas
- County: Atascosa
- Elevation: 433 ft (132 m)
- Time zone: UTC-6 (Central (CST))
  - Summer (DST): UTC-5 (CDT)
- Area code: 830
- GNIS feature ID: 1379755

Fashing is an unincorporated community in Atascosa County, in the U.S. state of Texas. According to the Handbook of Texas, the community had a population of 35 in 2000. It is located within the San Antonio metropolitan area.

Fashing shares a community center with nearby Peggy.

== Geography ==
Fashing is located at the intersection of Farm to Market Roads 2924 and 99, 29 mi (47 km) southeast of Jourdanton and 69 mi (111 km) southeast of San Antonio in southeastern Atascosa County.
