= Dobrowolski, Texas =

- Ghost town
- Location within Texas Location within the United States
- Coordinates: 28°53′34″N 98°38′34″W
- Country: United States
- State: Texas
- County: Atascosa
- Elevation: 522 ft (159 m)
- Time zone: UTC-6 (Central (CST))
  - Summer (DST): UTC-5 (CDT)
- Area code: 830
- GNIS feature ID: 1356092

Dobrowolski is a ghost town in Atascosa County, in the U.S. state of Texas. According to the Handbook of Texas, the community had a population of 10 in 2000. It is located within the San Antonio metropolitan area.

== History ==
The settlement where Dobrowolski is now was once named Tobey, after local land speculator Thomas Tobey, with the Tobey post office closing in 1919. The post office later reopened under the name Dobrowolski in 1920 after Alec Dobrowolski, who sold farm land in the area. By 1925, the population dropped to fifty, with the Dobrowolski post office closing in 1934.

== Geography ==
Dobrowolski was located on Texas State Highway 97, 6 mi (9.7 km) southwest of Jourdanton in west-central Atascosa County.

== Education ==
The school joined the Charlotte Independent School District in 1936. The community is served by the Charlotte ISD to this day.
