= W. Page Keeton =

American lawyer and law school dean (1909–1999)

- Born: Werdner Page Keeton; August 22, 1909; McCoy, Atascosa County, Texas, U.S.
- Died: January 10, 1999 (aged 89)
- Resting place: Texas State Cemetery
- Education: University of Texas School of Law (LLB); Harvard University (SJD)
- Occupations: Law professor and dean of the University of Texas School of Law
- Spouse: Madge Anna Stewart
- Children: Carole Keeton Strayhorn
- Relatives: Scott McClellan (grandson); Mark McClellan (grandson); Robert Keeton (brother); Barr McClellan (former son-in-law)

Werdner Page Keeton (August 22, 1909 – January 10, 1999) was an attorney and dean of the University of Texas School of Law for a quarter century.

== Education ==
Keeton was born in McCoy in Atascosa County, Texas the son of William Keeton and Ernestine. He attended the University of Texas at Austin where he was a member of both the Tejas Club and the Texas Cowboys. He graduated first in his class at the University of Texas School of Law in 1931 and joined the University of Texas law faculty the following year at the age of 23. He earned a Doctor of Juridical Science from Harvard University in 1936.

== Career as law school dean ==
Keeton served as dean of the law school at the University of Oklahoma for three years (1946-1949). He was appointed dean of the University of Texas Law School in 1949, a position he held until 1974. During the 1957-1958 school year Keeton was a visiting torts professor at UCLA Law School. At the University of Texas, he is credited with increasing the funding for the law school and making it possible to assemble a faculty that ranked among the best in the United States.

Keeton was a prolific writer and one of the foremost authorities on the law of torts. He was co-author of the most-cited work in Tort law, Prosser & Keeton on Torts.

Over the years Keeton dealt with a number of individual instances in which a prominent alumnus or powerful politician would urge him to silence or get rid of faculty members who were espousing unpopular or unorthodox political and social ideas. Dean Keeton would say:

"Well, we have people on the faculty that feel just as you do about the [particular social] issue that you're talking about, except for one thing. They believe in the idea that we ought to have freedom of thought on the faculty, and we ought to tolerate people on the faculty that disagree . ... In other words, they agree with your position on this issue, except they don't agree with your position that nobody else ought to be on the law faculty with a different position."

== Foundation founder ==
Keeton considered his greatest accomplishment as dean the formation of the University of Texas Law School Foundation, a separate educational corporation with a "powerful board, [one] that the administration just couldn't brush off." The members of the Foundation Board were prominent and successful lawyers who could contribute funds, raise funds, assure other alumni that their gifts would be used for the law school and not some other purpose, and resist efforts by the university administration and the legislature to reduce the law school's funding in response to its successes in fund-raising. As Dean Keeton later summarized his thinking, "it pays to have a power structure of your own." When the chancellor of the university objected to the fact that the existence of the Law School Foundation's board alongside the university's board of regents meant "that you'd have two boards to deal with, and you'd multiply your problems," Keeton responded: "Look, it's better to have money and problems than no money."

Upon retirement, Keeton offered, "If I had it to do all over again, I don't know that I could do near as well."

== Honors ==
Keeton served as president of the Association of American Law Schools; national chair of the Council of Legal Education Opportunity; and was presented the Torch of Liberty Award of the Anti-Defamation League. The City of Austin renamed 26th Street so that The University of Texas School of Law is now located at 727 Dean Keeton Street.

== Family ==
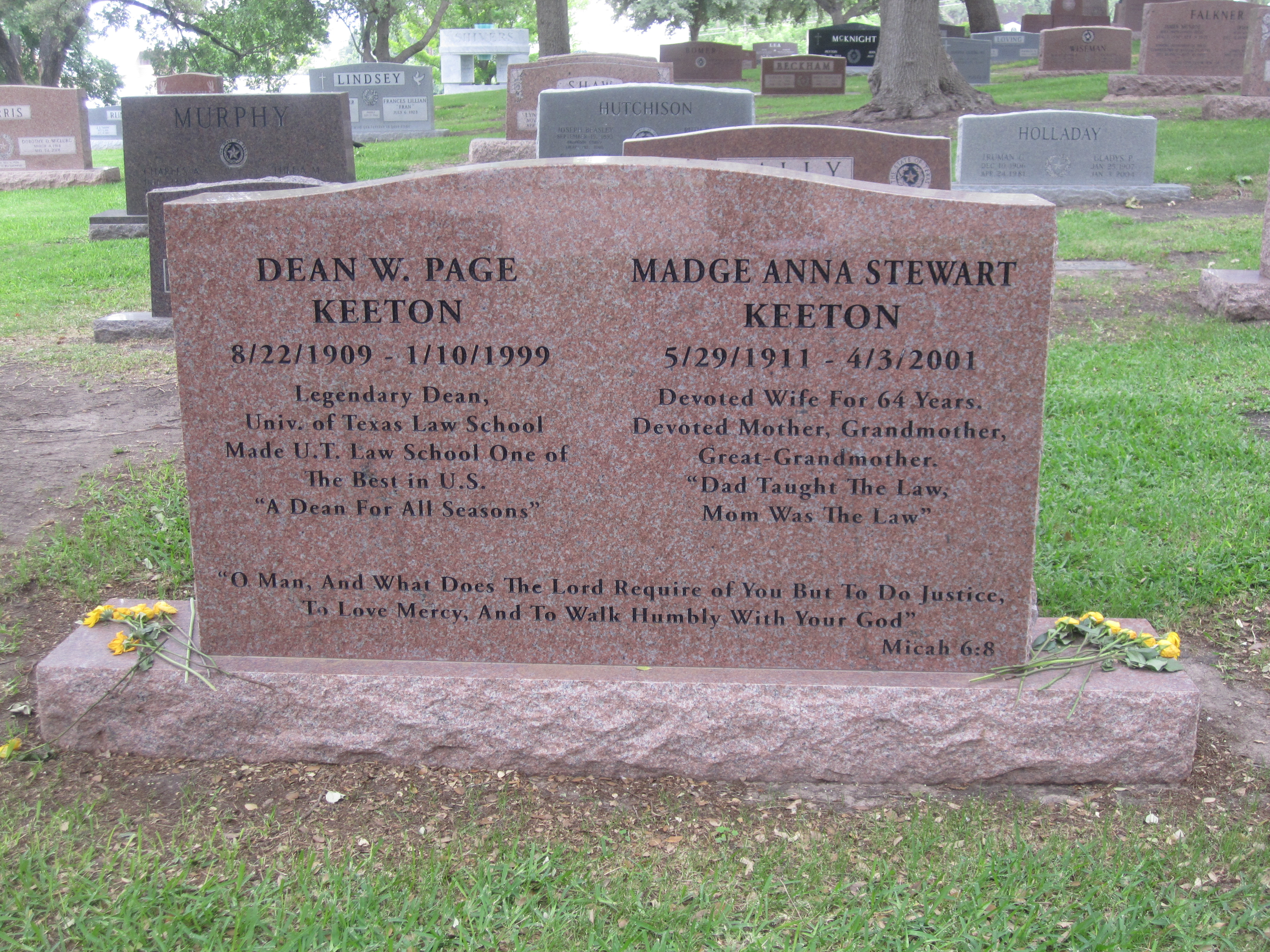
Tombstone of Dean and Mrs. W. Page Keeton at Texas State Cemetery in Austin, Texas

Keeton was the father of former Texas Comptroller and gubernatorial candidate Carole Keeton Strayhorn, and grandfather of Scott McClellan, former White House Press Secretary under U.S. President George W. Bush, and Mark McClellan, who headed the Centers for Medicare and Medicaid Services and was Commissioner of the Food and Drug Administration in the second Bush administration.

Keeton's grandsons Scott and Mark McClellan have both quoted Keeton's words as inspiring them to public service: "It's not the dollars you make; it's the difference you make."

Keeton's brother, Robert Keeton, was a federal judge and a prominent legal scholar, who contributed to the writing of Prosser and Keeton on Torts.
