= KMPI =

KMPI may refer to:

- Mariposa-Yosemite Airport (ICAO code KMPI)
- KMPI (FM), a defunct radio station (90.5 FM) licensed to serve McCoy, Texas, United States
