= Rossville, Texas =

Unincorporated community in Atascosa County, Texas, United States

- Unincorporated community
- Location within Texas Location within the United States
- Coordinates: 29°05′29″N 98°40′50″W
- Country: United States
- State: Texas
- County: Atascosa
- Elevation: 561 ft (171 m)
- Time zone: UTC-6 (Central (CST))
  - Summer (DST): UTC-5 (CDT)
- Area code: 830
- GNIS feature ID: 1380460

Rossville is an unincorporated community in Atascosa County, Texas, United States. According to the Handbook of Texas, the community had a population of 200 in 2000. It is located within the San Antonio metropolitan area.

== History ==
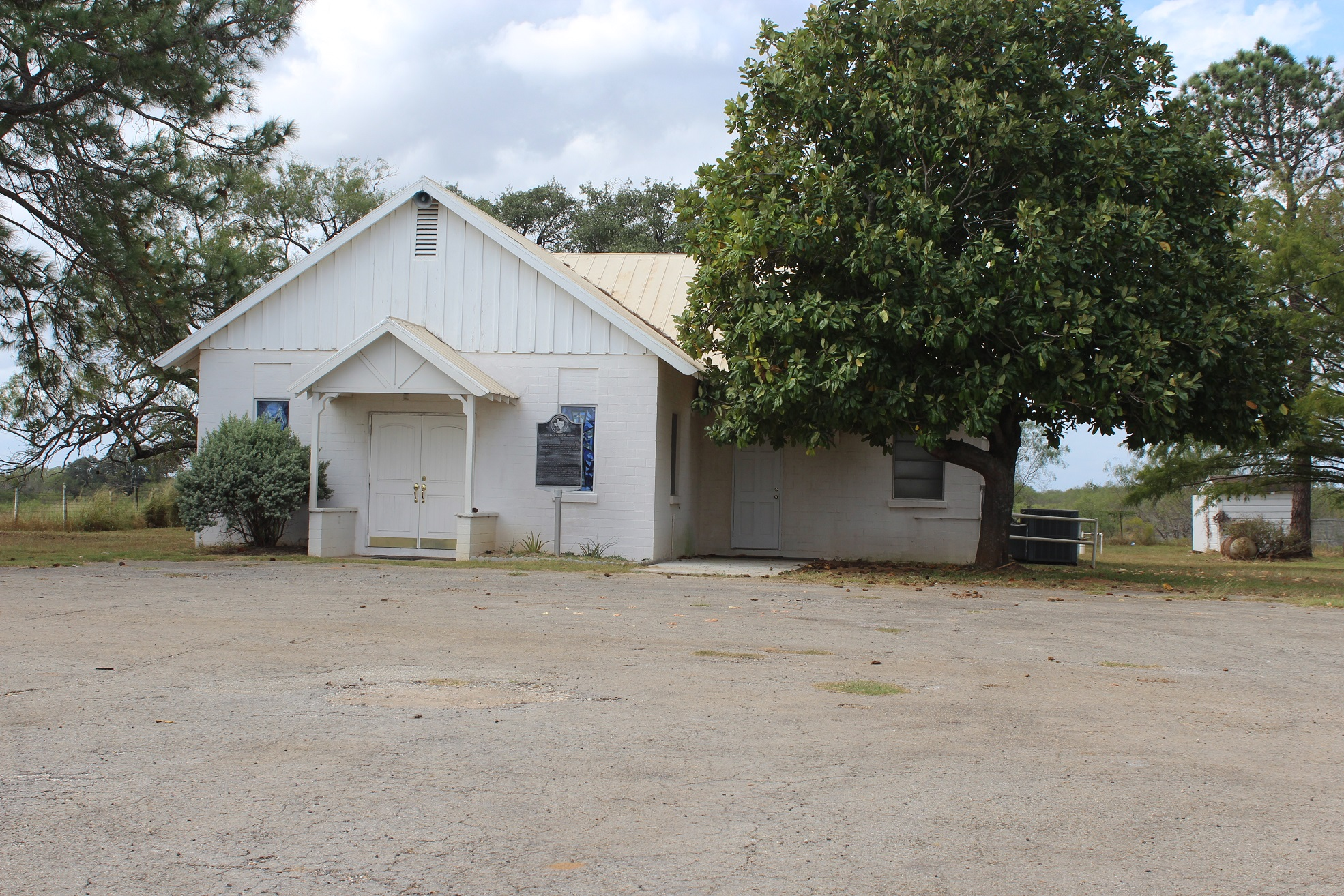
Sand Branch Baptist Church in Rossville, November 2016

The community also had a saloon. Many of the community's first settlers are buried in the cemetery. The cemetery sits on an acre of land that was donated to John Ross's wife.

== Geography ==
Rossville is located on Farm to Market Road 476, 8 mi (13 km) west of Poteet in Atascosa County.

== Education ==
Rossville had a one-room schoolhouse at the end of the 19th century and grew to two classrooms by the start of the 20th century. The school consolidated with the Poteet Independent School District in 1955 and was demolished. The community continues to be served by the Poteet ISD to this day.
