= Anchorage, Texas =

- Unincorporated community
- Location within Texas Location within the United States
- Coordinates: 29°04′03″N 98°42′21″W
- Country: United States
- State: Texas
- County: Atascosa
- Elevation: 548 ft (167 m)
- Time zone: UTC-6 (Central (CST))
  - Summer (DST): UTC-5 (CDT)
- Area code: 830
- GNIS feature ID: 1379345

Anchorage is an unincorporated community in Atascosa County, in the U.S. state of Texas. It is located within the San Antonio metropolitan area.

== History ==
A post office was established at Anchorage in 1889 and remained in operation until 1935. The community was so named when an early settler announced his intent to "anchor here". A Scottish sailor named Thomas Whittet bought 200 acres (81 ha) of land from Francisco De La Garza in 1889. The town had a general store the next year. It had another general store and a gin six years later, alongside a population of 15. Its population jumped to 120 by 1914 and had a physician named M.J. Whittet. Anchorage had only one business in operation in 1933 and then had a cemetery, a church, a factory, and a few scattered houses in the 1940s. The factory was not included on county maps in 1960, although the community continued to be listed on county maps in 1990 but with no further information.

== Geography ==
Anchorage is located just east of Farm to Market Road 2504, 14 mi (23 km) northwest of Pleasanton in west-central Atascosa County.

== Education ==
Today the community is served by the Poteet Independent School District.
