= Campbellton, Texas =

Unincorporated community in Atascosa County, Texas, United States

- Unincorporated community
- Location within Texas Location within the United States
- Coordinates: 28°44′51″N 98°18′09″W
- Country: United States
- State: Texas
- County: Atascosa
- Elevation: 240 ft (73 m)
- Time zone: UTC-6 (Central (CST))
  - Summer (DST): UTC-5 (CDT)
- Area code: 830
- GNIS feature ID: 1372901

Campbellton is an unincorporated community in Atascosa County, Texas, United States. According to the Handbook of Texas, the community had an estimated population of 350 in 2000. Campbellton is part of the San Antonio Metropolitan Statistical Area.

== History ==
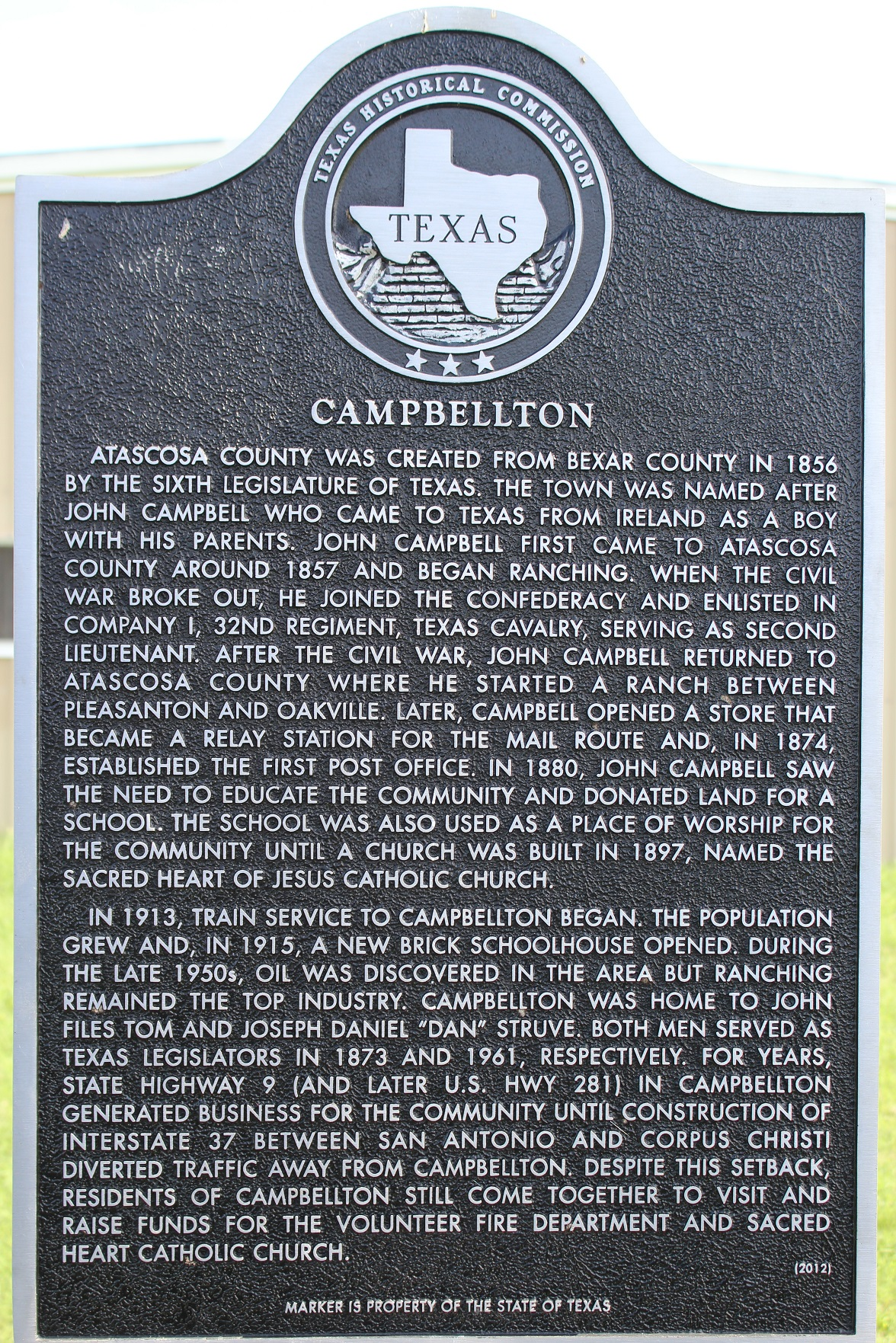
Campbellton State Historical Marker, January 2017

The community was founded in the 1860s by an Irish immigrant named John F. Campbell.

Although it is unincorporated, Campbellton has a post office with the ZIP code of 78008.

The Wild Man of the Navidad, one of the purported sightings of Bigfoot, was also filmed as a movie in Campbellton, in which locals appeared in small roles.

== Geography ==
Campbellton is located at the junction of U.S. Highway 281, FM 1099, and the Atascosa River in southeastern Atascosa County, approximately 12 miles (19 km) east of Christine and 54 miles (87 km) south of San Antonio. It is also located 20 mi (32 km) south of Pleasanton, 25 mi (40 km) southeast of Jourdanton, and 26 mi (42 km) north of Three Rivers. It is strategically located on a thoroughfare to the Rio Grande Valley. The alternate route of U.S. Route 281 also travels through the community.

== Education ==
John F Campbell founded the community's first school in the 1870s. It had 30 students and one teacher in 1904 and then had 169 students ten years later. It had 240 students and seven teachers in 1938. Children who finished elementary school were sent to schools in Pleasanton for middle and high school. The community continues to be served by the Pleasanton Independent School District to this day.
