= Peggy, Texas =

- Unincorporated community
- Location within Texas Location within the United States
- Coordinates: 28°44′23″N 98°10′43″W
- Country: United States
- State: Texas
- County: Atascosa
- Elevation: 381 ft (116 m)
- Time zone: UTC-6 (Central (CST))
  - Summer (DST): UTC-5 (CDT)
- Area code: 830
- GNIS feature ID: 1380341

Peggy is an unincorporated community in Atascosa County, Texas, United States. According to the Handbook of Texas, the community had a population of 22 in 2000. It is located within the San Antonio metropolitan area.

== History ==
Although it is unincorporated, Peggy has a post office, with the ZIP code 78062.

== Geography ==
Peggy is located along the intersection of Farm to Market Road 99 and another unnamed road, 27 mi (43 km) southeast of Jourdanton in southeastern Atascosa County. The nearest major city is San Antonio, located 65 mi (105 km) north via Interstate 37. Campbellton is also located 7 mi (11 km) west, near the next county line.

== Education ==
Public education in the community of Peggy is provided by the Karnes City Independent School District.
