= Verdi, Texas =

- Unincorporated community
- Location within Texas Location within the United States
- Coordinates: 29°03′00″N 98°23′58″W
- Country: United States
- State: Texas
- County: Atascosa
- Elevation: 443 ft (135 m)
- Time zone: UTC-6 (Central (CST))
  - Summer (DST): UTC-5 (CDT)
- Area code: 830
- GNIS feature ID: 1380716

Verdi is an unincorporated community in Atascosa County, in the U.S. state of Texas. According to the Handbook of Texas, the community had a population of 110 in 2000. It is located within the San Antonio metropolitan area.

== History ==
Settlers who came to the area by 1855 were primarily from Alabama, Arkansas, Georgia, Mississippi, Missouri, and Tennessee. Some were from Spanish origin. A Church of Christ was established in the community in 1858 and a Methodist church was added the next year. It then got a Roman Catholic church named St. Augustine Church in 1870, as well as Friendship Baptist Church in 1888. Verdi had a farming and ranching industry, in which the most common crops were produce, grains, meat, and dairy. Cotton was the most successful crop. The post office was applied by Sydney S. Smith in 1890. Businesses in Verdi included a store, a blacksmith shop, and cotton gins in the early 20th century.

== Geography ==
Verdi is located just west of Farm to Market Road 1784, 8 mi (13 km) northeast of Pleasanton and 13 mi (21 km) northeast of Jourdanton in northeastern Atascosa County.

== Education ==
It continues to be served by the Pleasanton ISD to this day. The school was also a polling place for Atascosa County in 1860. Two schools named St. Augustine and Liberty were established sometime before 1888. Verdi school's first senior class graduated in 1933.
