= McCoy, Atascosa County, Texas =

McCoy, Texas
- Unincorporated community
- Location within Texas Location within the United States
- Coordinates: 28°51′38″N 98°20′52″W
- Country: United States
- State: Texas
- County: Atascosa
- Elevation: 302 ft (92 m)
- Time zone: UTC-6 (Central (CST))
  - Summer (DST): UTC-5 (CDT)
- Area code: 830
- GNIS feature ID: 1380164

McCoy is an unincorporated community in Atascosa County, Texas, United States. According to the Handbook of Texas, the community had a population of 30 in 2000. It is located within the San Antonio metropolitan area.

== History ==
McCoy was named for local settler and rancher W.A. McCoy. This community had a population of 30 in 2000.

Although it is unincorporated, McCoy has a post office, with the ZIP code of 78113.

== Geography ==
McCoy is located along Farm to Market Road 541 and the Missouri Pacific Railroad line, 8 mi (13 km) north of Campbellton and 18 mi (29 km) southeast of Pleasanton in east-central Atascosa County.

== Education ==
McCoy had a school with two classrooms in 1920. The school had two more classrooms added and had an enrollment of 173 students and five teachers employed in 1935. It closed in 1950 and joined with the schools in Leal. The abandoned school building remained in 1952. Today the community is served by the Pleasanton Independent School District.

== Notable person ==
- W. Page Keeton, attorney and dean of the University of Texas School of Law
