= Amphion, Texas =

- Unincorporated community
- Location within Texas Location within the United States
- Coordinates: 28°59′55″N 98°38′08″W
- Country: United States
- State: Texas
- County: Atascosa
- Elevation: 453 ft (138 m)
- Time zone: UTC-6 (Central (CST))
  - Summer (DST): UTC-5 (CDT)
- Area code: 830
- GNIS feature ID: 1379342

Amphion is an unincorporated community in Atascosa County, in the U.S. state of Texas. According to the Handbook of Texas, the community had a population of 26 in 2000. It is located within the San Antonio metropolitan area.

== History ==
The soil series known as "Amphion clay loam", classed as a fine, mixed, superactive, hyperthermic Pachic Paleustoll, is named after the town.

== Geography ==
Amphion is located just east of Farm to Market Road 2146, 9 mi (14 km) northwest of Pleasanton and 6 mi (9.7 km) southwest of Poteet in west-central Atascosa County.

== Education ==
Today, the community is served by the Jourdanton Independent School District.
