= La Parita, Texas =

- Unincorporated community
- Location within Texas Location within the United States
- Coordinates: 28.8471990°N 98.5933531°W
- Country: United States
- State: Texas
- County: Atascosa
- Elevation: 404 ft (123 m)
- Time zone: UTC-6 (Central (CST))
  - Summer (DST): UTC-5 (CDT)
- Area code: 830
- GNIS feature ID: 1380045

La Parita is an unincorporated community in Atascosa County, in the U.S. state of Texas. According to the Handbook of Texas, the community had a population of 48 in 2000. It is located within the San Antonio metropolitan area.

== Geography ==
La Parita is located east of Farm to Market Road 1332, 7 mi (11 km) southeast of Charlotte in west-central Atascosa County.

== Education ==
The community continues to be served by the Jourdanton ISD today.
