= Hindes, Texas =

- Unincorporated community
- Location within Texas Location within the United States
- Coordinates: 28°43′01″N 98°47′25″W
- Country: United States
- State: Texas
- County: Atascosa
- Elevation: 390 ft (120 m)
- Time zone: UTC-6 (Central (CST))
  - Summer (DST): UTC-5 (CDT)
- Area code: 830
- GNIS feature ID: 1379937

Hindes is an unincorporated community in Atascosa County, in the U.S. state of Texas. According to the Handbook of Texas, the community had a population of 14 from 1974 through 2000. It is located within the San Antonio metropolitan area.

The transmitter for local radio station KSAH-FM is located in Hindes.

== Geography ==
Hindes is located just east of Texas State Highway 95, 4 mi (6.4 km) away from the Frio County line in southwestern Atascosa County.

== Education ==
The first school in Hindes opened in 1912 and had six classrooms. It had 88 students and three teachers in 1934. Today the community is served by the Charlotte Independent School District.
