= Black Hill, Texas =

- Unincorporated community
- Location within Texas Location within the United States
- Coordinates: 28°59′41″N 98°19′29″W
- Country: United States
- State: Texas
- County: Atascosa
- Elevation: 449 ft (137 m)
- Time zone: UTC-6 (Central (CST))
  - Summer (DST): UTC-5 (CDT)
- Area code: 830
- GNIS feature ID: 1379424

Black Hill is an unincorporated community in Atascosa County, in the U.S. state of Texas. According to the Handbook of Texas, its population was 60 in 2000. It is located within the San Antonio metropolitan area.

== History ==
Black Hill was named for the black rocks that dominate the landscape. It had one business and several scattered houses in the 1940s. It had a community center and a few scattered houses in the 1960s. Its population was 60 in 2000.

== Geography ==
Black Hill is located along Farm to Market Road 478, 9 mi (14 km) northwest of Pleasanton in northeastern Atascosa County.

== Education ==
In 1920, Black Hill had a school that was named by local settler Jack Temple. It had 29 students and two teachers in 1934. It then joined with the Pleasanton Independent School District in 1953. It continues to be served by Pleasanton ISD to this day.
