= Poteet High School (Poteet, Texas) =

- Front entrance

Location
- 800 Leming Drive; Poteet, Atascosa County, Texas 78065-0138; United States; 29.04729°N 98.5659°W

Information
- School type: Public, high school
- Locale: Rural: Fringe
- School district: Poteet ISD
- NCES School ID: 483552004029
- Principal: Tony Dominguez
- Teaching staff: 37.20 (on an FTE basis)
- Grades: 9–12
- Enrollment: 493 (2023–2024)
- Student to teacher ratio: 13.25
- Colors: Maroon & White
- Athletics conference: UIL Class AAA
- Mascot: Aggies/Lady Aggies
- Website: phs.poteetisd.org

Poteet High School is a public high school located in Poteet, Texas, U.S., and classified as a 3A school by the University Interscholastic League (UIL). It is part of the Poteet Independent School District located in central Atascosa County. During 2022–2023, Poteet High School had an enrollment of 508 students and a student to teacher ratio of 13.15. The school received an overall rating of "C" from the Texas Education Agency for the 2024–2025 school year.

== Athletics ==
The Poteet Aggies compete in the following sports

- Baseball
- Basketball
- Cross Country
- Football
- Powerlifting
- Soccer
- Softball
- Tennis
- Track and Field
- Volleyball

== See also ==
- Poteet High School (Mesquite, Texas)
