= Poteat =

Poteat is a surname.

== People ==
Notable people with the surname include:

- Hank Poteat (born 1977), American football player
- Harrison Poteat (fl. 1923–1939), American clergyman
- Ida Isabella Poteat (1858–1940), American artist and instructor
- S. Eugene Poteat (1930–2022), Central Intelligence Agency executive
- Tonia Poteat, American epidemiologist
- William H. Poteat (1919–2000), American academic and philosopher
- William Louis Poteat (1856–1938), American academic and college president

== Other uses ==
- Poteat House, a historic plantation house located near Yanceyville, North Carolina, U.S.

== See also ==
- Poteet (disambiguation)
