= Atascosa County, Texas =

County in Texas, United States

- County
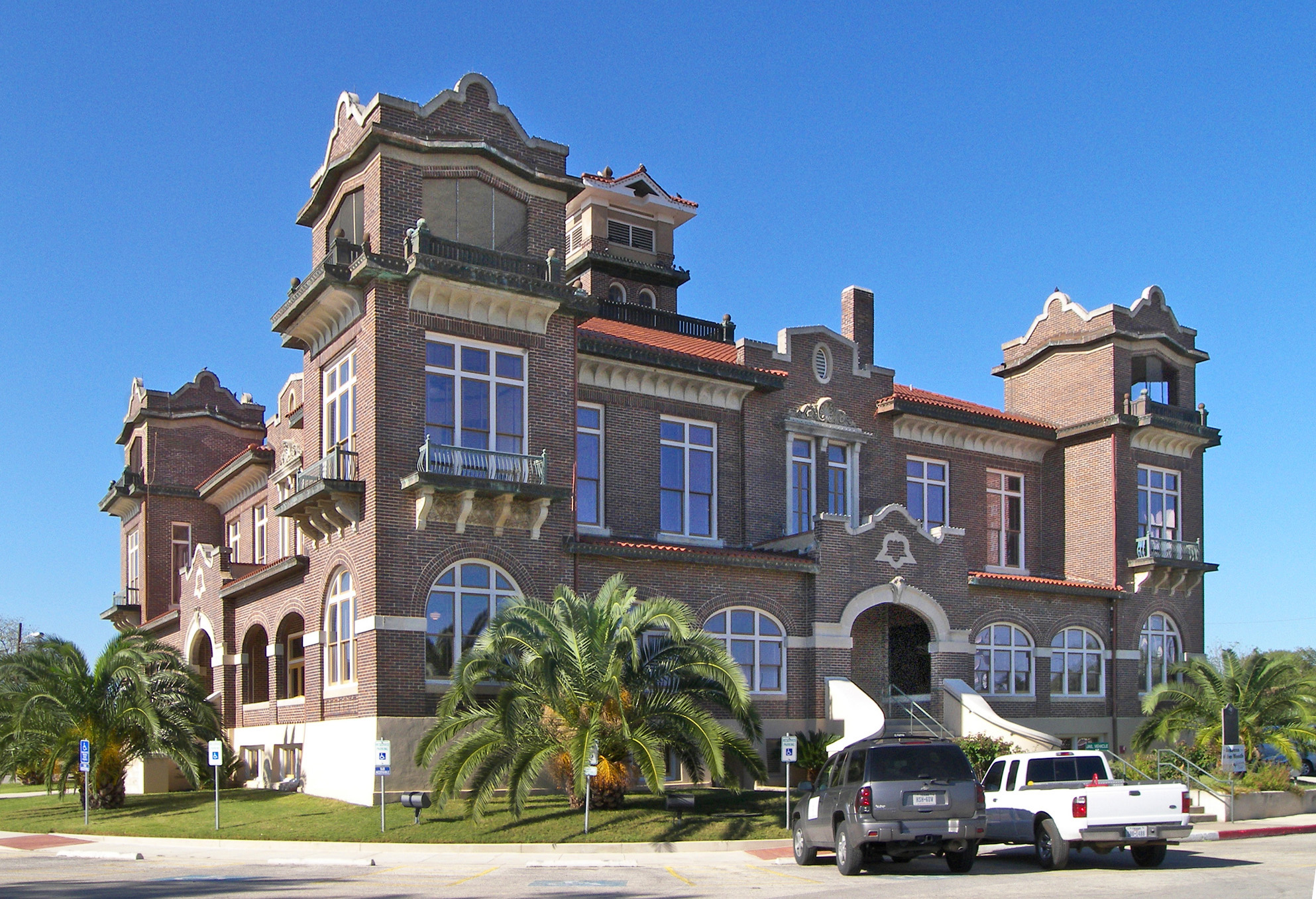
- The Atascosa County Courthouse in Jourdanton

- Location within the U.S. state of Texas
- Coordinates: 28°53′N 98°32′W
- Country: United States
- State: Texas
- Founded: 1856
- Named for: Atascosa River
- Seat: Jourdanton
- Largest city: Pleasanton

Area
  - Total: 1,221 sq mi (3,160 km^{2})
  - Land: 1,210 sq mi (3,100 km^{2})
  - Water: 1.9 sq mi (4.9 km^{2}) 0.2%

Population (2020)
  - Total: 48,981
  - Estimate (2025): 53,590 ▲
  - Density: 40.2/sq mi (15.5/km^{2})
- Time zone: UTC−6 (Central)
  - Summer (DST): UTC−5 (CDT)
- Congressional district: 28th
- Website: co.atascosa.tx.us

Atascosa County (/ˌætəsˈkoʊsə/ AT-əs-KOH-sə) is a county located in the U.S. state of Texas. It is in South Texas and its county seat is Jourdanton.

As of the 2020 United States Census, its population was 48,981. Atascosa County is part of the San Antonio-New Braunfels metropolitan statistical area.

== History ==
In 1856, the Texas Legislature established Atascosa County from portions of Bexar County and named it for the Atascosa River.

== Geography ==
According to the United States Census Bureau, the county has a total area of 1,221 square miles (3,160 km^{2}), of which 1.9 square miles (4.9 km^{2}) (0.2%) are covered by water.

The county contains rolling hills and knolls, sloped to the southeast. It is drained by the Atascosa River, which exits the county at its southeastern corner. The highest point is a localized hill near the northeastern border with Bexar County, between Lytle and Somerset in Bexar, at 810 ft (250 m) above sea level.

=== Major highways ===
- Interstate 35
- Interstate 37
- U.S. Highway 281
  - US 281 Alt.
- State Highway 16
- State Highway 85
- State Highway 97
- State Highway 132
- State Highway 173
- Loop 282
- Spur 162
- Spur 199
- Spur 242

=== Adjacent counties ===
- Bexar County - north
- Wilson County - northeast
- Karnes County - east
- Live Oak County - southeast
- McMullen County - south
- La Salle County - southwest
- Frio County - west
- Medina County - northwest

== Demographics ==
Historical population
Census	Pop.	Note	%±
1860	1,578		—
1870	2,915		84.7%
1880	4,217		44.7%
1890	6,459		53.2%
1900	7,143		10.6%
1910	10,004		40.1%
1920	12,702		27.0%
1930	15,654		23.2%
1940	19,275		23.1%
1950	20,048		4.0%
1960	18,828		−6.1%
1970	18,696		−0.7%
1980	25,055		34.0%
1990	30,533		21.9%
2000	38,628		26.5%
2010	44,911		16.3%
2020	48,981		9.1%
2025 (est.)	53,590	▲	9.4%
U.S. Decennial Census; 1850–1900 1910; 1920 1930 1940; 1950 1960 1970; 1980 1990 2000; 2010 2020

=== Racial and ethnic composition ===
Atascosa County, Texas – Racial and ethnic composition Note: the US Census treats Hispanic/Latino as an ethnic category. This table excludes Latinos from the racial categories and assigns them to a separate category. Hispanics/Latinos may be of any race.
Race / Ethnicity (NH = Non-Hispanic)	Pop 1980	Pop 1990	Pop 2000	Pop 2010	Pop 2020	% 1980	% 1990	% 2000	% 2010	% 2020
White alone (NH)	12,817	14,194	15,284	16,295	16,066	51.16%	46.49%	39.57%	36.28%	32.80%
Black or African American alone (NH)	104	108	179	256	340	0.42%	0.35%	0.46%	0.57%	0.69%
Native American or Alaska Native alone (NH)	48	46	145	143	116	0.19%	0.15%	0.38%	0.32%	0.24%
Asian alone (NH)	55	58	103	130	170	0.22%	0.19%	0.27%	0.29%	0.35%
Native Hawaiian or Pacific Islander alone (NH)	x	x	16	14	15	x	x	0.04%	0.03%	0.03%
Other race alone (NH)	48	63	31	43	177	0.19%	0.21%	0.08%	0.10%	0.36%
Mixed race or Multiracial (NH)	x	x	250	245	919	x	x	0.65%	0.55%	1.88%
Hispanic or Latino (any race)	11,983	16,064	22,620	27,785	31,178	47.83%	52.61%	58.56%	61.87%	63.65%
Total	25,055	30,533	38,628	44,911	48,981	100.00%	100.00%	100.00%	100.00%	100.00%

=== 2020 census ===
As of the 2020 census, the county had a population of 48,981. The median age was 37.4 years. 26.5% of residents were under the age of 18 and 15.6% of residents were 65 years of age or older. For every 100 females there were 98.3 males, and for every 100 females age 18 and over there were 95.8 males age 18 and over.

The racial makeup of the county was 57.6% White, 0.9% Black or African American, 1.0% American Indian and Alaska Native, 0.4% Asian, <0.1% Native Hawaiian and Pacific Islander, 15.4% from some other race, and 24.7% from two or more races. Hispanic or Latino residents of any race comprised 63.7% of the population.

28.5% of residents lived in urban areas, while 71.5% lived in rural areas.

There were 16,485 households in the county, of which 37.6% had children under the age of 18 living in them. Of all households, 52.3% were married-couple households, 17.5% were households with a male householder and no spouse or partner present, and 23.7% were households with a female householder and no spouse or partner present. About 21.0% of all households were made up of individuals and 9.6% had someone living alone who was 65 years of age or older.

There were 18,777 housing units, of which 12.2% were vacant. Among occupied housing units, 75.2% were owner-occupied and 24.8% were renter-occupied. The homeowner vacancy rate was 1.4% and the rental vacancy rate was 10.9%.

=== 2010 census ===
As of the 2010 United States census, 44,911 people resided in the county; 84.9% were White, 0.8% Black or African American, 0.8% Native American, 0.3% Asian, 0.1% Pacific Islander, 10.9% of some other race, and 2.3% of two or more races. About 61.9% were Hispanics or Latinos (of any race).

=== 2000 census ===
As of the 2000 United States census, 38,628 people, 12,816 households, and 10,022 families were in the county. The population density was 31 people per square mile (12 people/km^{2}). The 14,883 housing units had an average density of 12 per square mile (4.6/km^{2}). The racial makeup of the county was 73.23% White, 0.60% African American, 0.80% Native American, 0.31% Asian, 21.6% from other races, and 3.47% from two or more races. About 58.56% of the population were Hispanics or Latinos of any race.

Of the 12,816 households, 41.7% had children under 18 living with them, 60.3% were married couples living together, 13.0% had a female householder with no husband present, and 21.8% were not families. About 18.9% of all households were made up of individuals, and 8.7% had someone living alone who was 65 or older. The average household size was 2.99, and the average family size was 3.41.

The age distribution was 31.7% under 18, 8.9% from 18 to 24, 27.6% from 25 to 44, 21.0% from 45 to 64, and 10.8% who were 65 or older. The median age was 32 years. For every 100 females, there were 96.60 males. For every 100 females 18 and over, there were 94.20 males.

The median income for a household in the county was $33,081, and for a family was $37,705. Males had a median income of $27,702 versus $18,810 for females. The per capita income for the county was $14,276. About 16.10% of families and 20.20% of the population were below the poverty line, including 25.60% of those under age 18 and 21.70% of those age 65 or over.

== Education ==
These school districts serve Atascosa County:

- Charlotte Independent School District (partial)
- Jourdanton Independent School District
- Karnes City Independent School District (partial)
- Lytle Independent School District (partial)
- Pleasanton Independent School District
- Poteet Independent School District
- Somerset Independent School District (partial)

Most of the county is in the service area of Alamo Community College District. The portion in Pleasanton ISD is zoned to Coastal Bend College (formerly Bee County College).

== Communities ==
=== Cities ===
- Charlotte
- Jourdanton (county seat)
- Lytle (partly in Medina and Bexar counties)
- Pleasanton
- Poteet

=== Town ===
- Christine

=== Census-designated place ===
- Leming

=== Unincorporated communities ===
- Amphion
- Anchorage
- Black Hill
- Campbellton
- Coughran
- Crown
- Davis
- Espey
- Fashing
- Hindes
- Iuka
- Kyote
- La Parita
- McCoy
- Peggy
- Rossville
- Verdi

=== Ghost towns ===
- Ditto
- Dobrowolski
- Leal

== Gallery ==
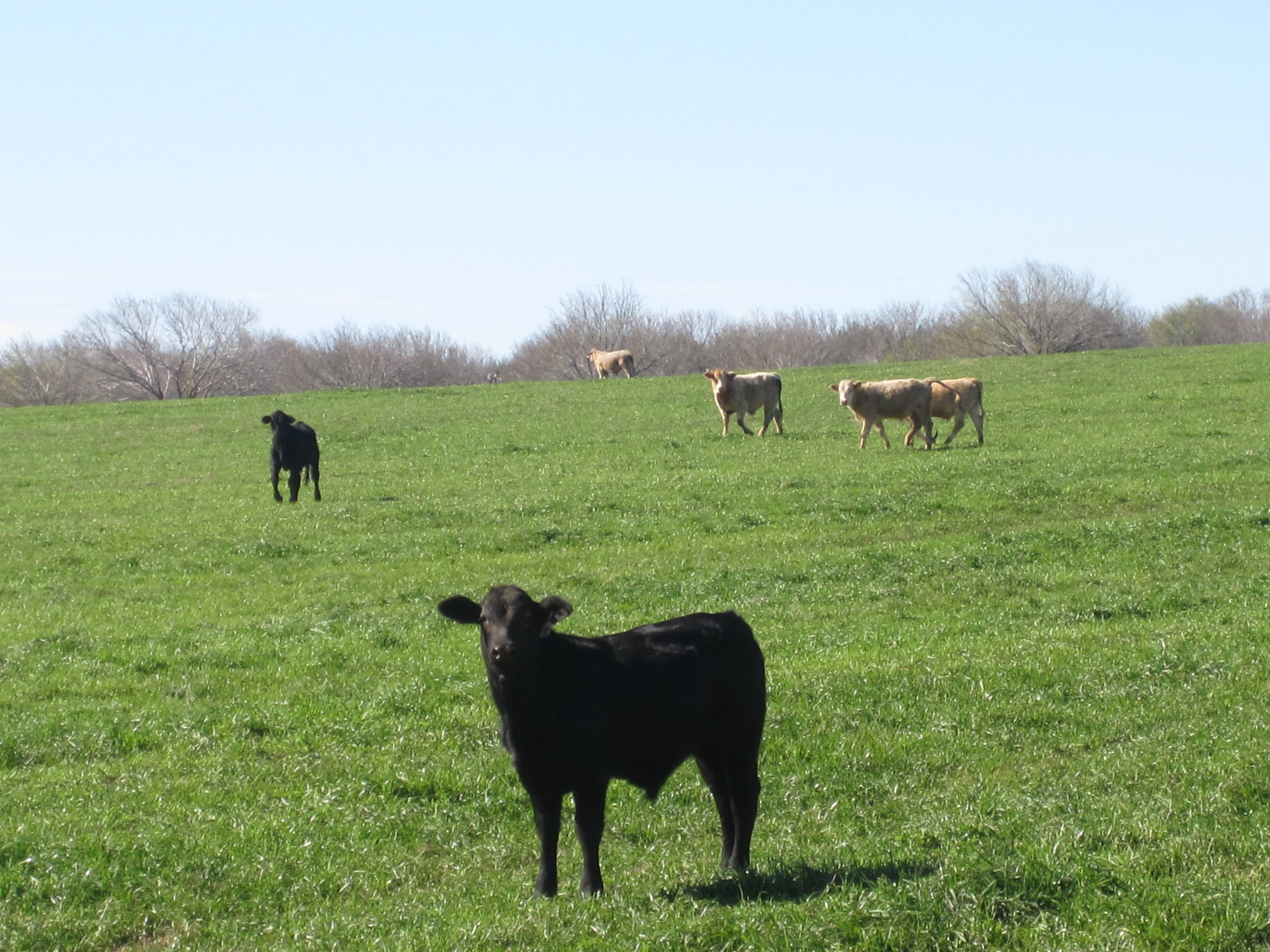
Atascosa County has long been cattle country

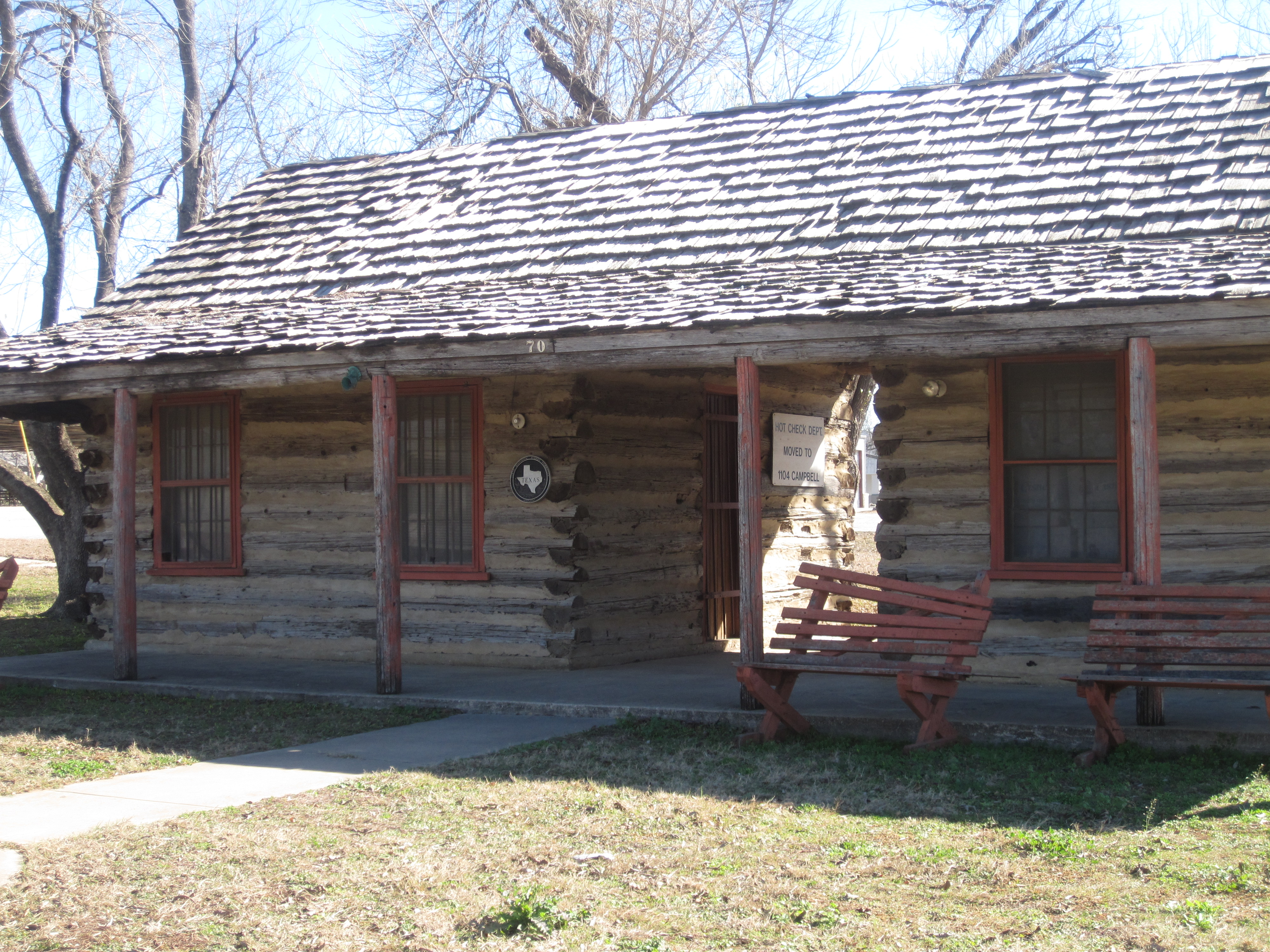
Replica of the original Atascosa County log courthouse in Jourdanton

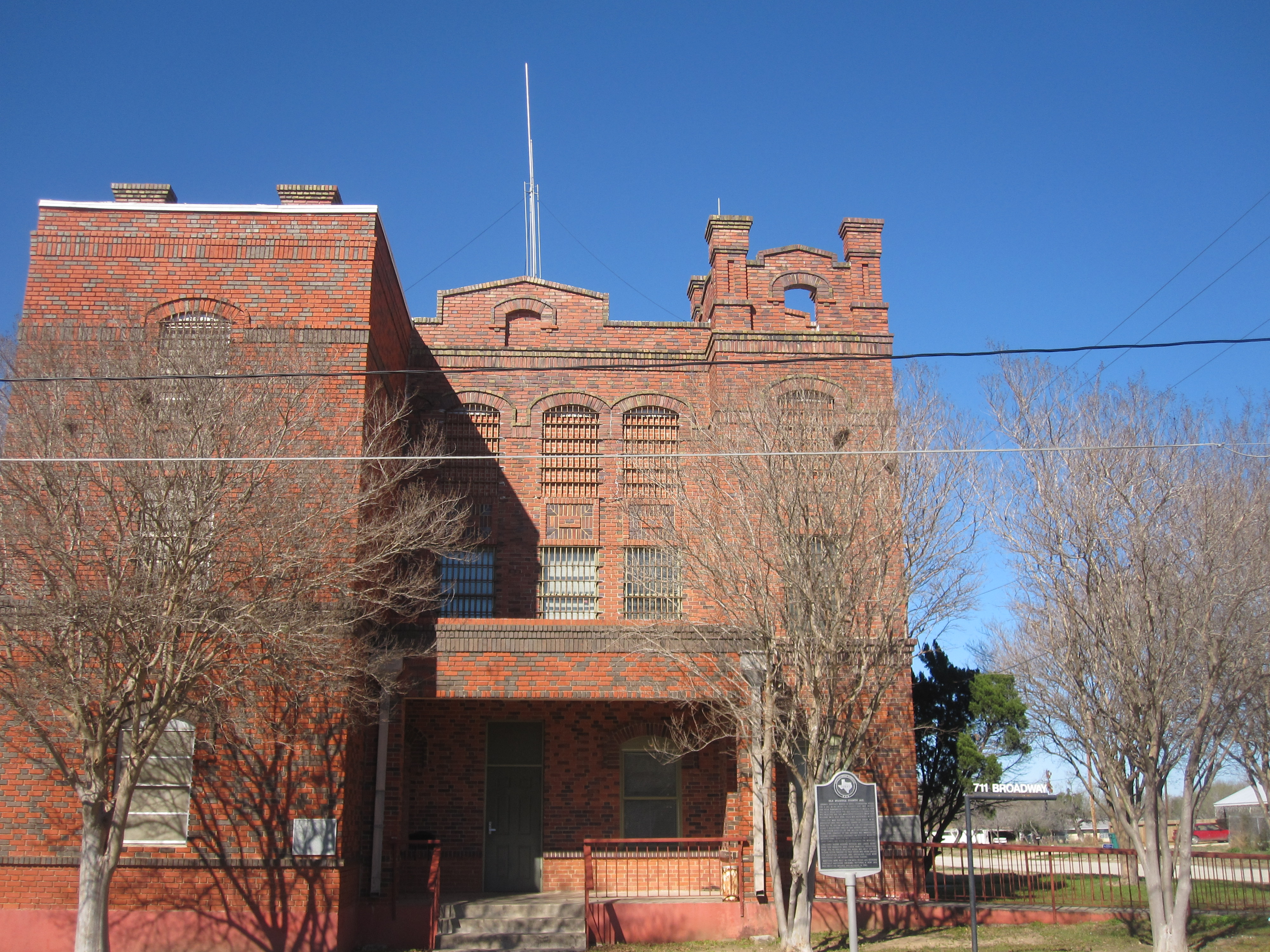
The old Atascosa County Jail in Jourdanton was used from 1911 to 1982

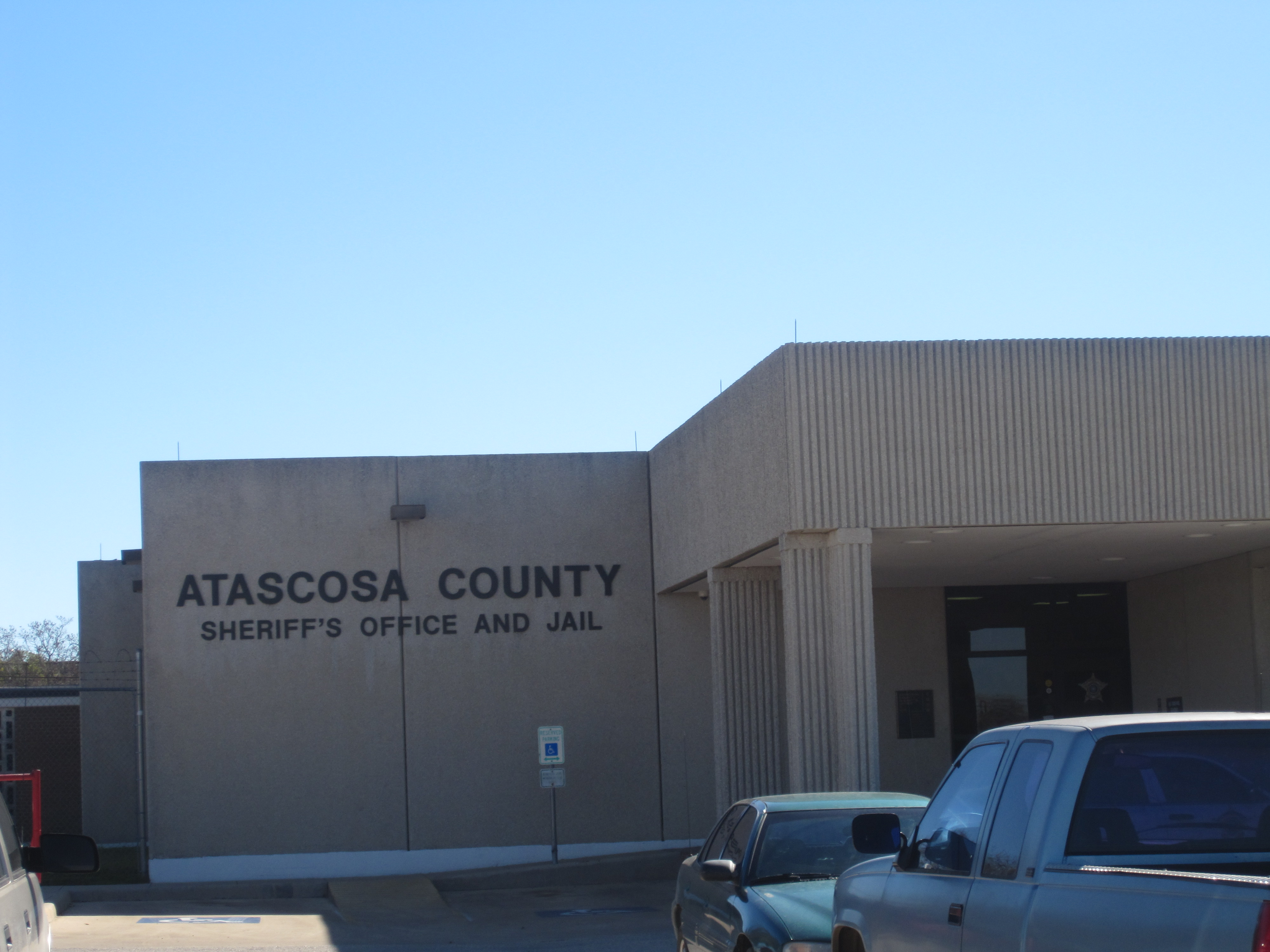
The Atascosa County Sheriff's Office and Jail in Jourdanton is located behind the old log courthouse

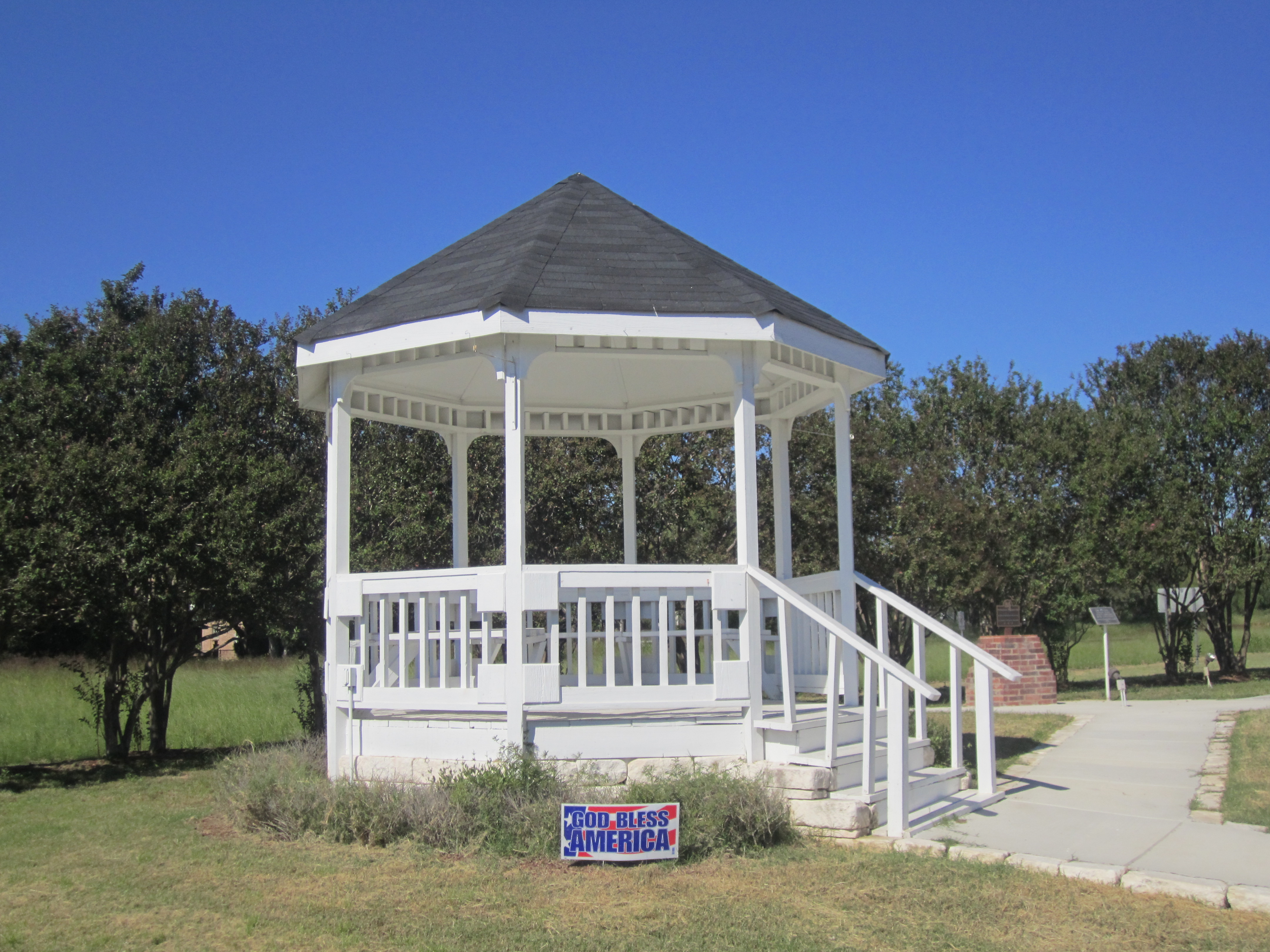
Gazebo at Veterans Memorial Park in Lytle

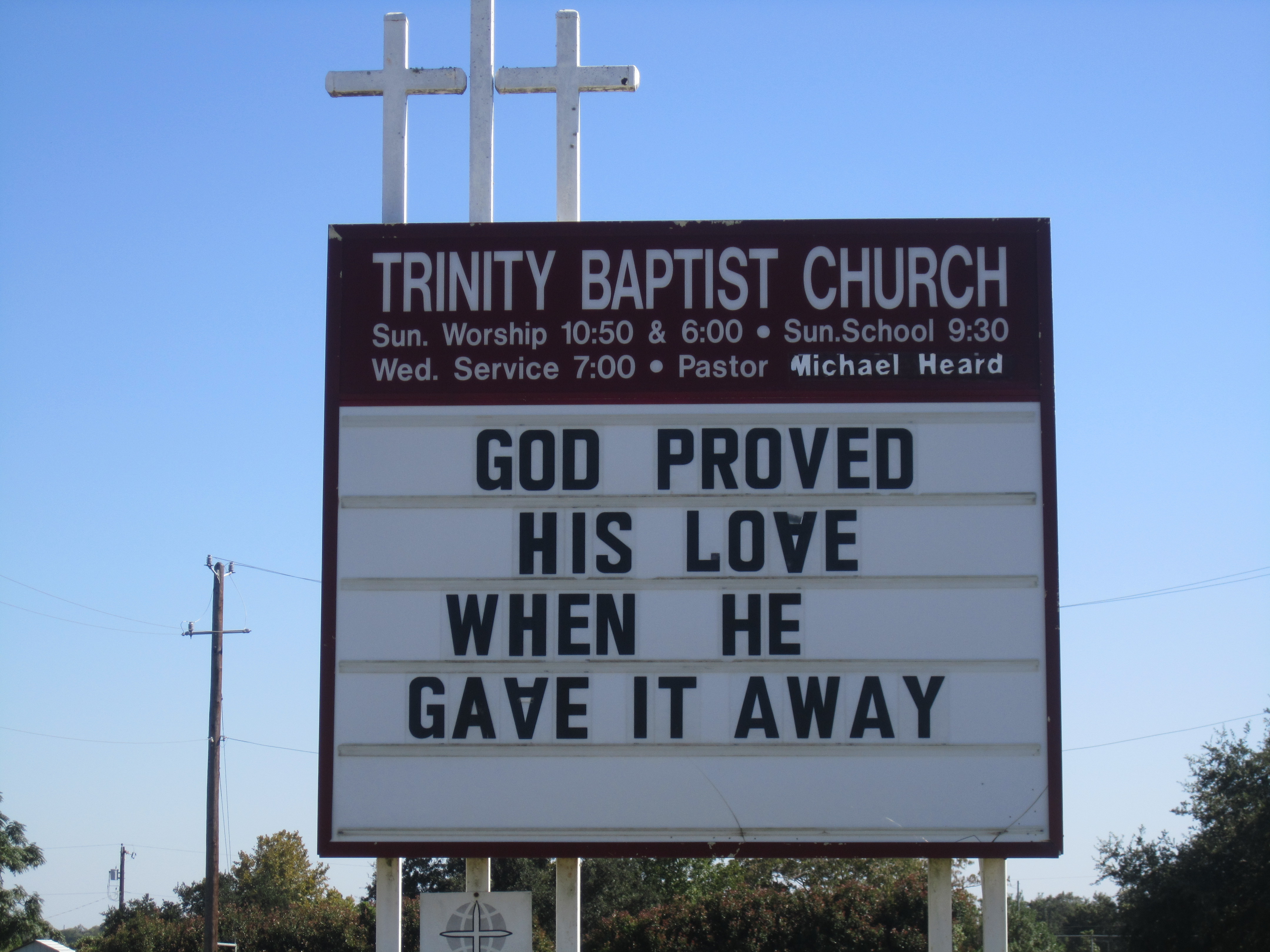
Sign at Trinity Baptist Church in Lytle

== Politics ==
United States presidential election results for Atascosa County, Texas
Year	Republican		Democratic		Third party(ies)	
Year	No.	%	No.	%	No.	%
1912	34	4.92%	593	85.82%	64	9.26%
1916	119	14.69%	635	78.40%	56	6.91%
1920	185	24.12%	531	69.23%	51	6.65%
1924	303	21.81%	869	62.56%	217	15.62%
1928	888	56.56%	682	43.44%	0	0.00%
1932	192	8.32%	2,101	91.07%	14	0.61%
1936	285	12.13%	2,041	86.85%	24	1.02%
1940	418	17.83%	1,922	82.00%	4	0.17%
1944	685	25.89%	1,757	66.40%	204	7.71%
1948	704	25.77%	1,895	69.36%	133	4.87%
1952	2,147	50.15%	2,124	49.61%	10	0.23%
1956	1,804	54.55%	1,492	45.12%	11	0.33%
1960	1,812	41.55%	2,544	58.34%	5	0.11%
1964	1,283	28.41%	3,224	71.39%	9	0.20%
1968	1,805	35.41%	2,522	49.47%	771	15.12%
1972	3,400	65.28%	1,804	34.64%	4	0.08%
1976	2,415	34.15%	4,565	64.55%	92	1.30%
1980	4,364	51.53%	3,980	46.99%	125	1.48%
1984	5,279	59.68%	3,547	40.10%	19	0.21%
1988	4,777	50.26%	4,657	49.00%	70	0.74%
1992	3,806	39.41%	3,766	38.99%	2,086	21.60%
1996	4,102	44.33%	4,259	46.02%	893	9.65%
2000	6,231	57.98%	4,322	40.22%	193	1.80%
2004	7,635	63.02%	4,421	36.49%	60	0.50%
2008	5,462	54.96%	4,415	44.43%	61	0.61%
2012	7,461	58.65%	5,133	40.35%	127	1.00%
2016	8,618	63.03%	4,651	34.02%	404	2.95%
2020	12,039	66.37%	5,876	32.40%	223	1.23%
2024	13,142	71.25%	5,153	27.94%	149	0.81%

United States Senate election results for Atascosa County, Texas1
Year	Republican		Democratic		Third party(ies)	
Year	No.	%	No.	%	No.	%
2024	11,973	65.94%	5,739	31.61%	446	2.46%

United States Senate election results for Atascosa County, Texas2
Year	Republican		Democratic		Third party(ies)	
Year	No.	%	No.	%	No.	%
2020	11,906	66.53%	5,588	31.22%	402	2.25%

Texas Gubernatorial election results for Atascosa County
Year	Republican		Democratic		Third party(ies)	
Year	No.	%	No.	%	No.	%
2022	8,801	69.30%	3,709	29.21%	189	1.49%

=== Commissioners Court ===
Under Texas state law, each county is governed by a commissioners court with one countywide elected judge and four precinct-level elected commissioners. Republicans currently hold all five seats on the Atascosa County Commissioners Court.

Current composition of the Atascosa County Commissioners Court
Precinct	Name	Affiliation	First elected
Judge	Weldon Cude	Republican	2022
1	Mark Gillespie	Republican	2017
2	Mark Bowen	Republican	2022
3	Butch Pawelek	Republican	2024
4	Joseph Eustace	Republican	2026

== See also ==
- National Register of Historic Places listings in Atascosa County, Texas
- Recorded Texas Historic Landmarks in Atascosa County
