= Espey, Texas =

- Unincorporated community
- Location within Texas Location within the United States
- Coordinates: 29°06′45″N 98°29′20″W
- Country: United States
- State: Texas
- County: Atascosa
- Elevation: 515 ft (157 m)
- Time zone: UTC-6 (Central (CST))
  - Summer (DST): UTC-5 (CDT)
- Area code: 830
- GNIS feature ID: 2034623

Espey is an unincorporated community in Atascosa County, in the U.S. state of Texas. According to the Handbook of Texas, the community had a population of 55 in 2000. It is located within the San Antonio metropolitan area.

== Geography ==
Espey is located on US Highway 281, approximately 10 mi (16 km) north of Pleasanton in northern Atascosa County.

== Education ==
Espey is served by the Pleasanton Independent School District.
