= Poteet (surname) =

Poteet is a surname. Notable people with the surname include:

- Cody Poteet (born 1994), American baseball pitcher
- George Poteet (1948–2024), American racing driver
- Jerry Poteet (1936–2012), American martial arts instructor
- Scott Poteet (born 1973), American pilot

== See also ==
- Poteet (disambiguation)
