= Coughran, Texas =

- Unincorporated community
- Location within Texas Location within the United States
- Coordinates: 28°56′40″N 98°24′49″W
- Country: United States
- State: Texas
- County: Atascosa
- Elevation: 341 ft (104 m)
- Time zone: UTC-6 (Central (CST))
  - Summer (DST): UTC-5 (CDT)
- Area code: 830
- GNIS feature ID: 1379602

Coughran is an unincorporated community in Atascosa County, in the U.S. state of Texas. According to the Handbook of Texas, the community had a population of 20 in 2000. It is located within the San Antonio metropolitan area.

== Geography ==
Coughran is located at the junction of Farm to Market Road 1334 and the Missouri Pacific Railroad, 4 mi (6.4 km) southeast of Pleasanton in east-central Atascosa County.
