= Christine, Texas =

- Town
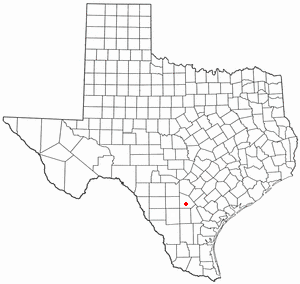
- Location of Christine, Texas

- Coordinates: 28°47′10″N 98°30′09″W
- Country: United States
- State: Texas
- County: Atascosa

Area
  - Total: 1.72 sq mi (4.45 km^{2})
  - Land: 1.72 sq mi (4.45 km^{2})
  - Water: 0 sq mi (0.00 km^{2})
- Elevation: 325 ft (99 m)

Population (2020)
  - Total: 337
  - Density: 196/sq mi (75.7/km^{2})
- Time zone: UTC-6 (Central (CST))
  - Summer (DST): UTC-5 (CDT)
- ZIP code: 78012
- Area code: 830
- FIPS code: 48-14860
- GNIS feature ID: 24132016

Christine is a town in Atascosa County, Texas, United States. The population was 337 at the 2020 census. It is part of the San Antonio Metropolitan Statistical Area.

== Etymology ==
In October 1910, the town of "New Artesia" was to be incorporated. When the papers were presented in Austin, the men who took them there were told that they would have to change the name since there was already a town in West Texas with that name. The men returned home, called a town meeting and asked for suggestions. Not having any luck, the city council members finally authorized their wives to choose a suitable name. The ladies renamed New Artesia "Christine" after Christine Andrews, the first baby girl born in the town. She was the daughter of City Marshal James Andrews and wife, Rieta. The corrected papers were taken back to Austin and Christine was incorporated on October 22, 1910.

== Geography ==
Christine is located 10 miles (16 km) south of Jourdanton, the county seat.

According to the United States Census Bureau, the town has a total area of 1.8 square miles (4.7 km^{2}), all land.

== Demographics ==
Historical population
Census	Pop.	Note	%±
1920	259		—
1930	524		102.3%
1940	286		−45.4%
1950	289		1.0%
1960	276		−4.5%
1970	289		4.7%
1980	392		35.6%
1990	368		−6.1%
2000	436		18.5%
2010	390		−10.6%
2020	337		−13.6%
U.S. Decennial Census; 2020 Census

As of the census of 2000, there were 436 people, 140 households, and 116 families residing in the town. The population density was 248.0 inhabitants per square mile (95.8/km^{2}). There were 160 housing units at an average density of 91.0 per square mile (35.1/km^{2}). The racial makeup of the town was 78.90% White, 0.23% Asian, 14.91% from other races, and 5.96% from two or more races. Hispanic or Latino people of any race were 74.54% of the population.

There were 140 households, out of which 48.6% had children under the age of 18 living with them, 65.0% were married couples living together, 12.9% had a female householder with no husband present, and 17.1% were non-families. 17.1% of all households were made up of individuals, and 8.6% had someone living alone who was 65 years of age or older. The average household size was 3.11 and the average family size was 3.50.

In the town, the population was spread out, with 37.6% under the age of 18, 6.9% from 18 to 24, 29.6% from 25 to 44, 15.8% from 45 to 64, and 10.1% who were 65 years of age or older. The median age was 30 years. For every 100 females, there were 96.4 males. For every 100 females age 18 and over, there were 92.9 males.

The median income for a household in the town was $23,333, and the median income for a family was $25,375. Males had a median income of $23,333 versus $13,281 for females. The per capita income for the town was $10,465. About 34.5% of families and 38.3% of the population were below the poverty line, including 47.4% of those under age 18 and 36.2% of those age 65 or over.

== Education ==
Christine is served by the Jourdanton Independent School District.
