= Leal, Texas =

- Ghost town
- Location within Texas Location within the United States
- Coordinates: 28°54′51″N 98°21′37″W
- Country: United States
- State: Texas
- County: Atascosa, Bexar
- Elevation: 302 ft (92 m)
- Time zone: UTC-6 (Central (CST))
  - Summer (DST): UTC-5 (CDT)
- Area code: 830
- GNIS feature ID: 1380070

Leal is a ghost town in Atascosa and Bexar counties, in the U.S. state of Texas. It is located within the San Antonio metropolitan area.

== History ==
A post office was established at Leal in 1858 and remained in operation until 1867. It was named in honor of a local family. The community disappeared after the Civil War and is now a part of the communities of Cassin and Earle.

== Geography ==
Leal is located at the intersection of Leon Creek and the Medina River in southern Bexar County. It also extends into Atascosa County.

== Education ==
Leal is served by the Pleasanton Independent School District.
