= Atascosa River =

Coordinates: 28.590°N 98.239°W

Location
- Country: United States

Physical characteristics
- Source
  - location: Texas

The Atascosa River is a river tributary of the Frio River, which is a tributary of the Nueces River in Texas.

== See also ==
- List of rivers of Texas
