= Charlotte, Texas =

City in Atascosa County, Texas, United States

- City
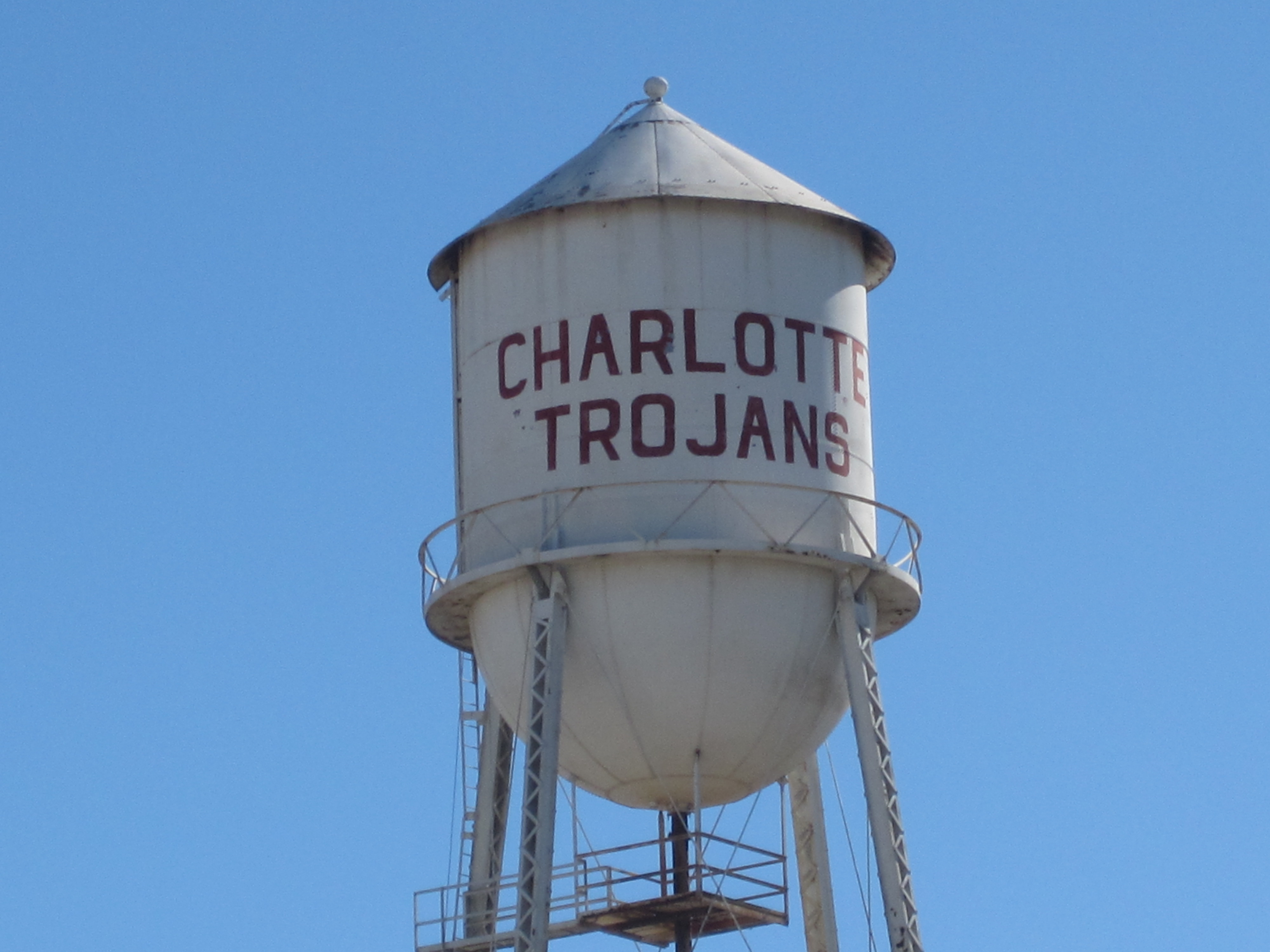
- The Charlotte Trojans are the school teams in Charlotte, Texas

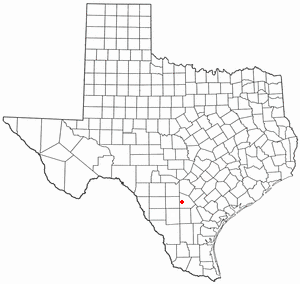
- Location of Charlotte, Texas

- Interactive map of Charlotte, Texas
- Coordinates: 28°51′43″N 98°42′23″W
- Country: United States
- State: Texas
- County: Atascosa

Area
  - Total: 2.04 sq mi (5.28 km^{2})
  - Land: 2.04 sq mi (5.28 km^{2})
  - Water: 0 sq mi (0.00 km^{2})
- Elevation: 541 ft (165 m)

Population (2020)
  - Total: 1,524
  - Density: 748/sq mi (289/km^{2})
- Time zone: UTC-6 (Central (CST))
  - Summer (DST): UTC-5 (CDT)
- ZIP code: 78011
- Area code: 830
- FIPS code: 48-14404
- GNIS feature ID: 1354329

Charlotte is a city in Atascosa County, Texas, United States. The population was 1,524 at the 2020 census. It is part of the San Antonio Metropolitan Statistical Area. The town is named for Charlotte Simmons, the daughter of Dr. Charles Simmons, who aided in the development of Atascosa County.

== Geography ==
Charlotte is located 52 miles (84 km) south of downtown San Antonio.

According to the United States Census Bureau, the city has a total area of 2.0 square miles (5.2 km^{2}), all land.

=== Climate ===
The climate in this area is characterized by hot, humid summers and generally mild to cool winters. According to the Köppen Climate Classification system, Charlotte has a humid subtropical climate, abbreviated "Cfa" on climate maps.

Climate data for Charlotte, Texas (5 miles north-northwest) (1981–2010 normals, extremes 1962–2012)
| Month | Jan | Feb | Mar | Apr | May | Jun | Jul | Aug | Sep | Oct | Nov | Dec | Year |
|---|---|---|---|---|---|---|---|---|---|---|---|---|---|
| Record high °F (°C) | 93 (34) | 100 (38) | 100 (38) | 107 (42) | 105 (41) | 109 (43) | 106 (41) | 111 (44) | 110 (43) | 107 (42) | 97 (36) | 90 (32) | 111 (44) |
| Mean daily maximum °F (°C) | 67.1 (19.5) | 71.0 (21.7) | 77.2 (25.1) | 84.2 (29.0) | 89.4 (31.9) | 93.9 (34.4) | 96.0 (35.6) | 97.1 (36.2) | 91.9 (33.3) | 85.1 (29.5) | 76.1 (24.5) | 67.7 (19.8) | 83.1 (28.4) |
| Daily mean °F (°C) | 54.6 (12.6) | 58.3 (14.6) | 64.5 (18.1) | 71.6 (22.0) | 78.3 (25.7) | 82.9 (28.3) | 84.5 (29.2) | 84.9 (29.4) | 80.4 (26.9) | 73.0 (22.8) | 63.9 (17.7) | 55.6 (13.1) | 71.0 (21.7) |
| Mean daily minimum °F (°C) | 42.0 (5.6) | 45.6 (7.6) | 51.9 (11.1) | 59.0 (15.0) | 67.1 (19.5) | 71.8 (22.1) | 73.0 (22.8) | 72.8 (22.7) | 68.9 (20.5) | 60.8 (16.0) | 51.8 (11.0) | 43.4 (6.3) | 59.0 (15.0) |
| Record low °F (°C) | 14 (−10) | 14 (−10) | 17 (−8) | 28 (−2) | 37 (3) | 55 (13) | 59 (15) | 58 (14) | 44 (7) | 27 (−3) | 20 (−7) | 6 (−14) | 6 (−14) |
| Average precipitation inches (mm) | 1.43 (36) | 1.72 (44) | 1.99 (51) | 1.97 (50) | 2.77 (70) | 3.39 (86) | 2.27 (58) | 1.90 (48) | 2.74 (70) | 3.09 (78) | 1.79 (45) | 1.51 (38) | 26.57 (674) |
| Average precipitation days (≥ 0.01 in) | 5.4 | 5.4 | 5.6 | 4.5 | 5.7 | 5.5 | 4.4 | 4.1 | 5.0 | 5.5 | 4.3 | 5.0 | 60.4 |
Source: NOAA

== Demographics ==
Historical population
| Census | Pop. | Note | %± |
|---|---|---|---|
| 1950 | 1,272 | | — |
| 1960 | 1,465 | | 15.2% |
| 1970 | 1,329 | | −9.3% |
| 1980 | 1,443 | | 8.6% |
| 1990 | 1,475 | | 2.2% |
| 2000 | 1,637 | | 11.0% |
| 2010 | 1,715 | | 4.8% |
| 2020 | 1,524 | | −11.1% |
U.S. Decennial Census

=== 2020 census ===
As of the 2020 census, Charlotte had a population of 1,524. The median age was 37.5 years. 26.6% of residents were under the age of 18 and 15.7% of residents were 65 years of age or older. For every 100 females there were 96.9 males, and for every 100 females age 18 and over there were 94.3 males age 18 and over.

0% of residents lived in urban areas, while 100.0% lived in rural areas.

There were 526 households in Charlotte, of which 39.4% had children under the age of 18 living in them. Of all households, 50.6% were married-couple households, 15.6% were households with a male householder and no spouse or partner present, and 24.9% were households with a female householder and no spouse or partner present. About 18.8% of all households were made up of individuals and 8.7% had someone living alone who was 65 years of age or older.

There were 581 housing units, of which 9.5% were vacant. Among occupied housing units, 80.8% were owner-occupied and 19.2% were renter-occupied. The homeowner vacancy rate was 0.9% and the rental vacancy rate was 8.0%.

Charlotte racial composition (NH = Non-Hispanic) (Note: Note: the US Census treats Hispanic/Latino as an ethnic category. This table excludes Latinos from the racial categories and assigns them to a separate category. Hispanics/Latinos can be of any race.)
| Race | Number | Percentage |
|---|---|---|
| White (NH) | 211 | 13.85% |
| Black or African American (NH) | 5 | 0.33% |
| Asian (NH) | 3 | 0.2% |
| Some Other Race (NH) | 5 | 0.33% |
| Mixed/Multi-Racial (NH) | 16 | 1.05% |
| Hispanic or Latino | 1,284 | 84.25% |
| Total | 1,524 | |

Racial composition as of the 2020 census
| Race | Percent |
|---|---|
| White | 57.0% |
| Black or African American | 0.4% |
| American Indian and Alaska Native | 1.0% |
| Asian | 0.2% |
| Native Hawaiian and Other Pacific Islander | 0% |
| Some other race | 14.6% |
| Two or more races | 26.8% |
| Hispanic or Latino (of any race) | 84.3% |

=== 2000 census ===
As of the census of 2000, there were 1,637 people, 514 households, and 401 families residing in the city. The population density was 823.4 inhabitants per square mile (317.9/km^{2}). There were 585 housing units at an average density of 294.3 per square mile (113.6/km^{2}). The racial makeup of the city was 64.94% White, 0.06% African American, 1.65% Native American, 29.93% from other races, and 3.42% from two or more races. Hispanic or Latino of any race were 81.19% of the population.

There were 514 households, out of which 45.1% had children under the age of 18 living with them, 54.3% were married couples living together, 17.1% had a female householder with no husband present, and 21.8% were non-families. 18.7% of all households were made up of individuals, and 10.5% had someone living alone who was 65 years of age or older. The average household size was 3.18 and the average family size was 3.61.

In the city, the population was spread out, with 34.8% under the age of 18, 10.2% from 18 to 24, 27.4% from 25 to 44, 18.0% from 45 to 64, and 9.7% who were 65 years of age or older. The median age was 30 years. For every 100 females, there were 98.9 males. For every 100 females age 18 and over, there were 92.1 males.

The median income for a household in the city was $24,792, and the median income for a family was $27,976. Males had a median income of $24,375 versus $15,313 for females. The per capita income for the city was $9,769. About 24.9% of families and 30.0% of the population were below the poverty line, including 35.1% of those under age 18 and 25.0% of those age 65 or over.

== Government ==
Charlotte is governed by a city council. Council members are elected by the city's voters every two years. The city council has no term limit.

== Education ==
Charlotte is served by the Charlotte Independent School District and home to the Charlotte High School Trojans. According to Guadalupe San Miguel, In Charlotte ISD is where the first official legal complaint regarding racial segregation against Mexicans in Texas took place in 1928. The complaint was filed by Felipe Vela on behalf of his daughter, Amada Vela. Their racial segregation complaint reached the State Board of Education and they sided with the Vela family.

== Gallery ==
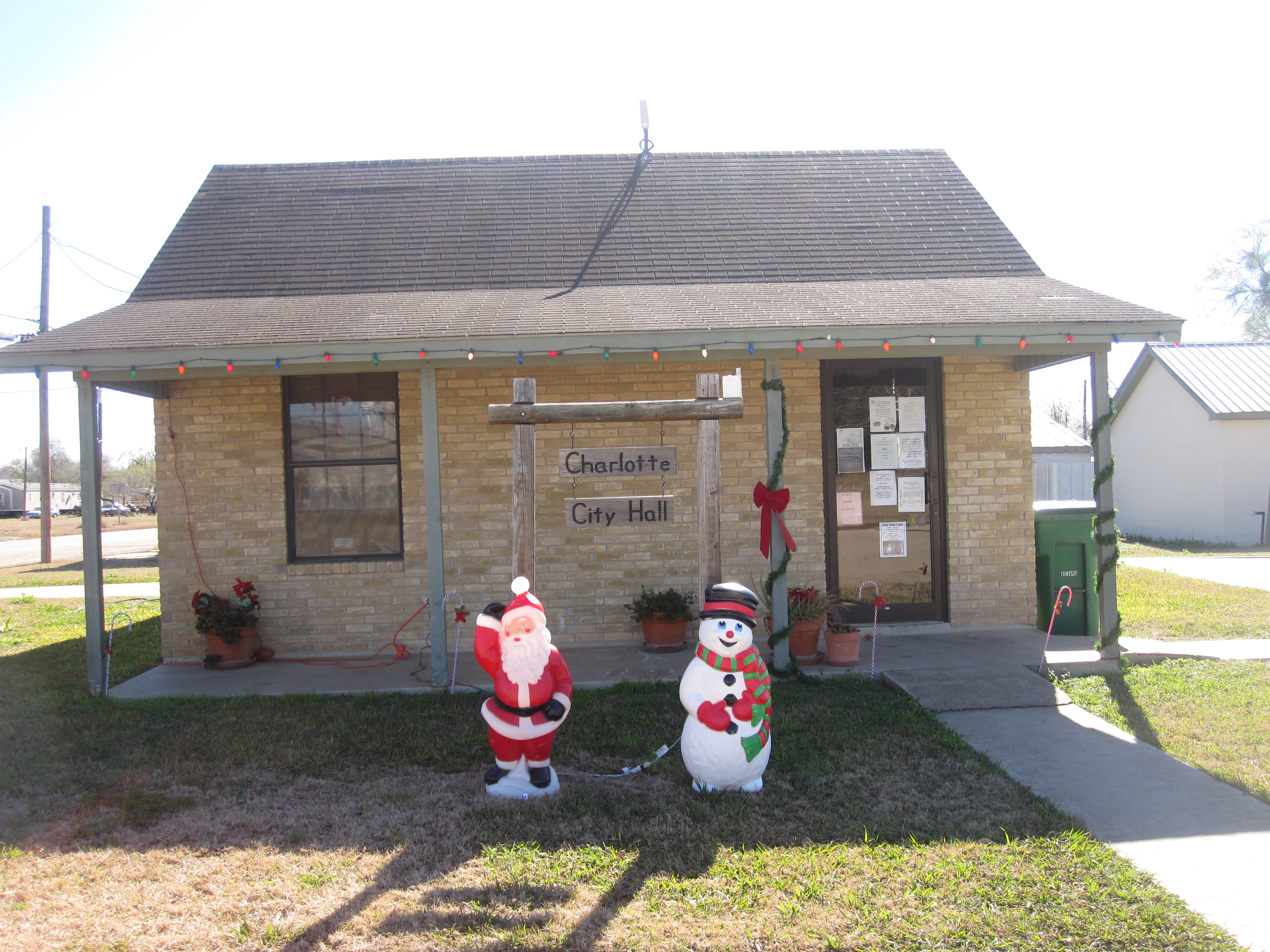
The small City Hall decorated at Christmas

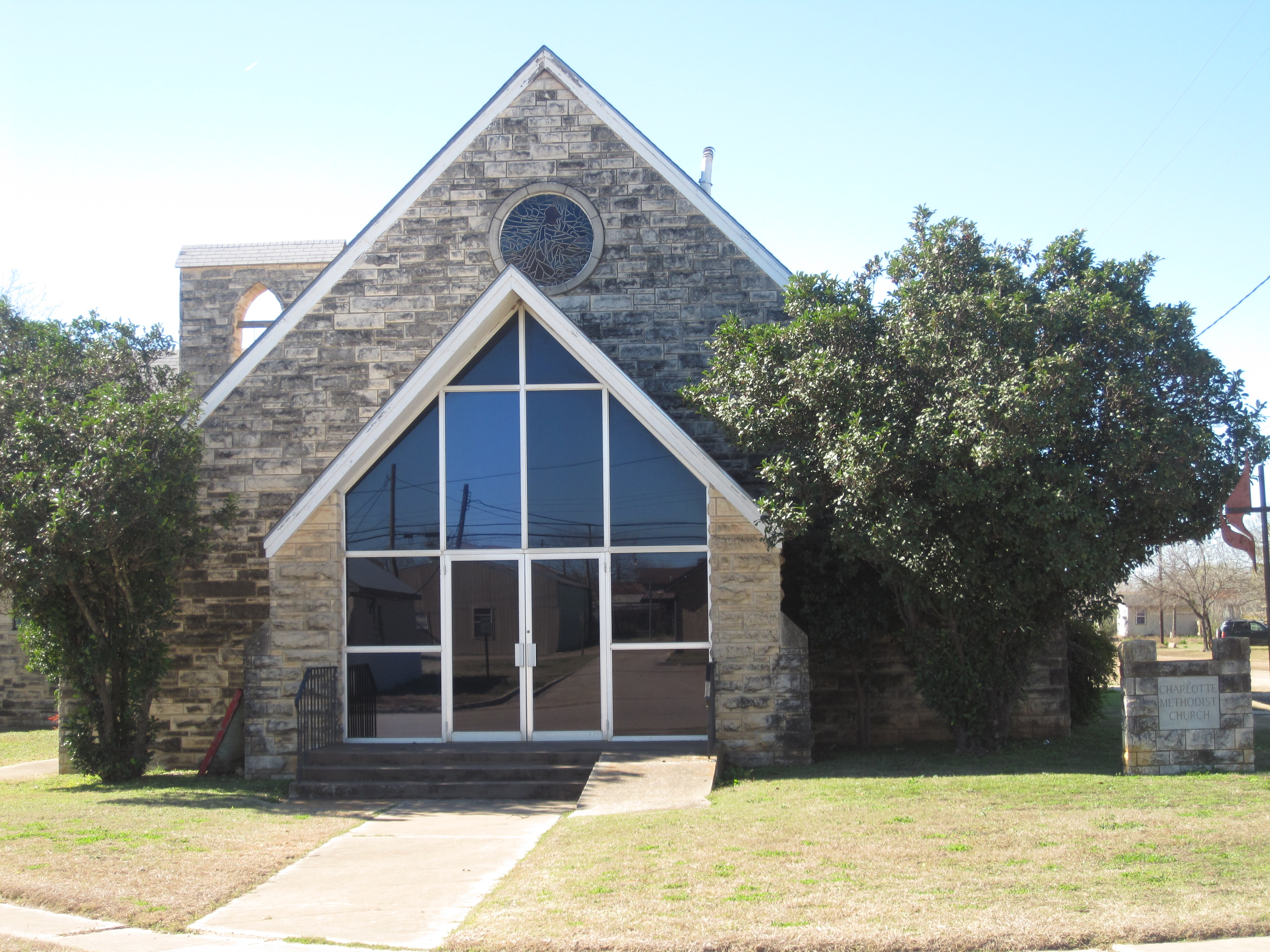
The First United Methodist Church, across the street from City Hall

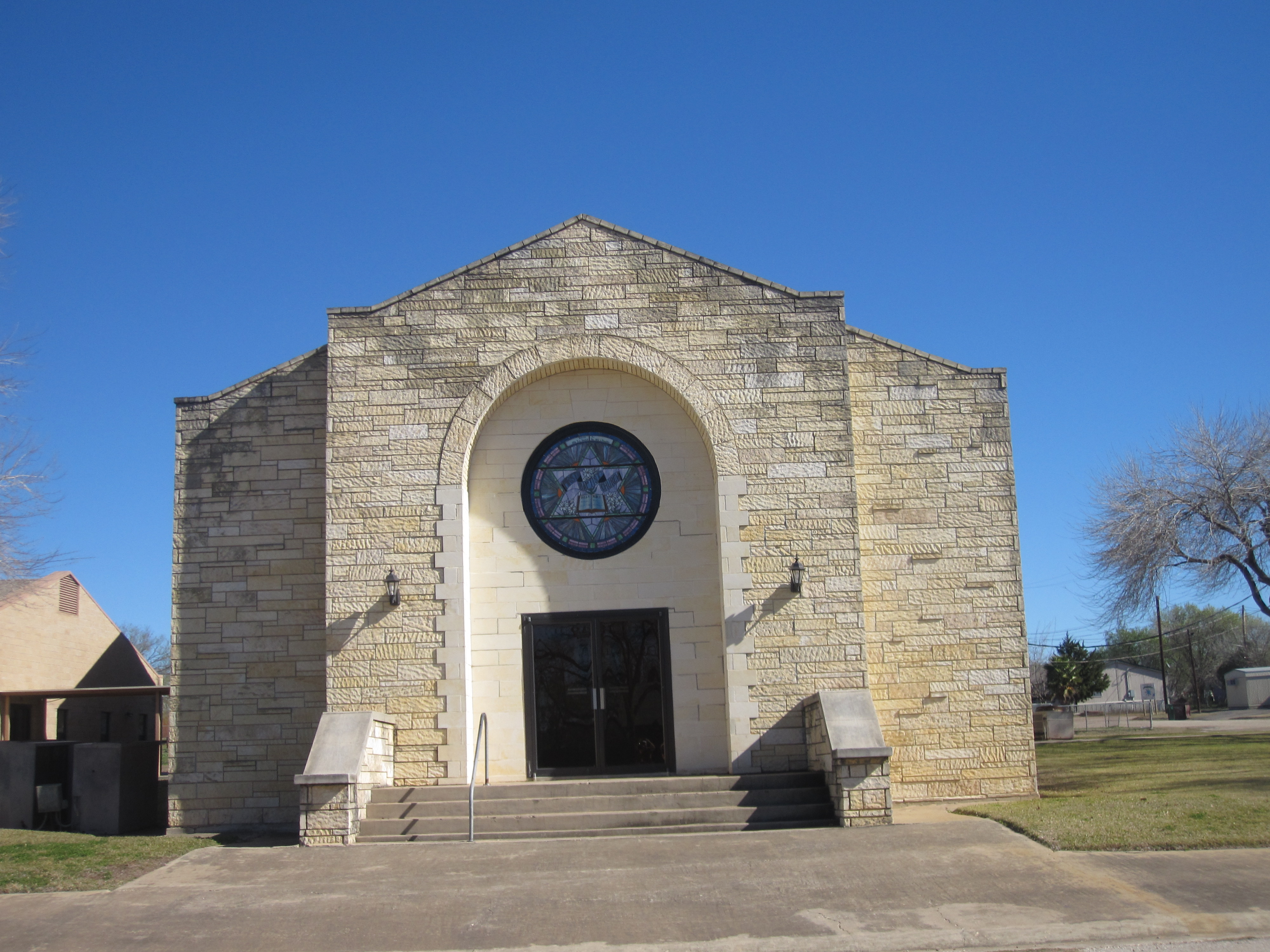
The architecture of the First Baptist Church resembles a fort or other western structure.

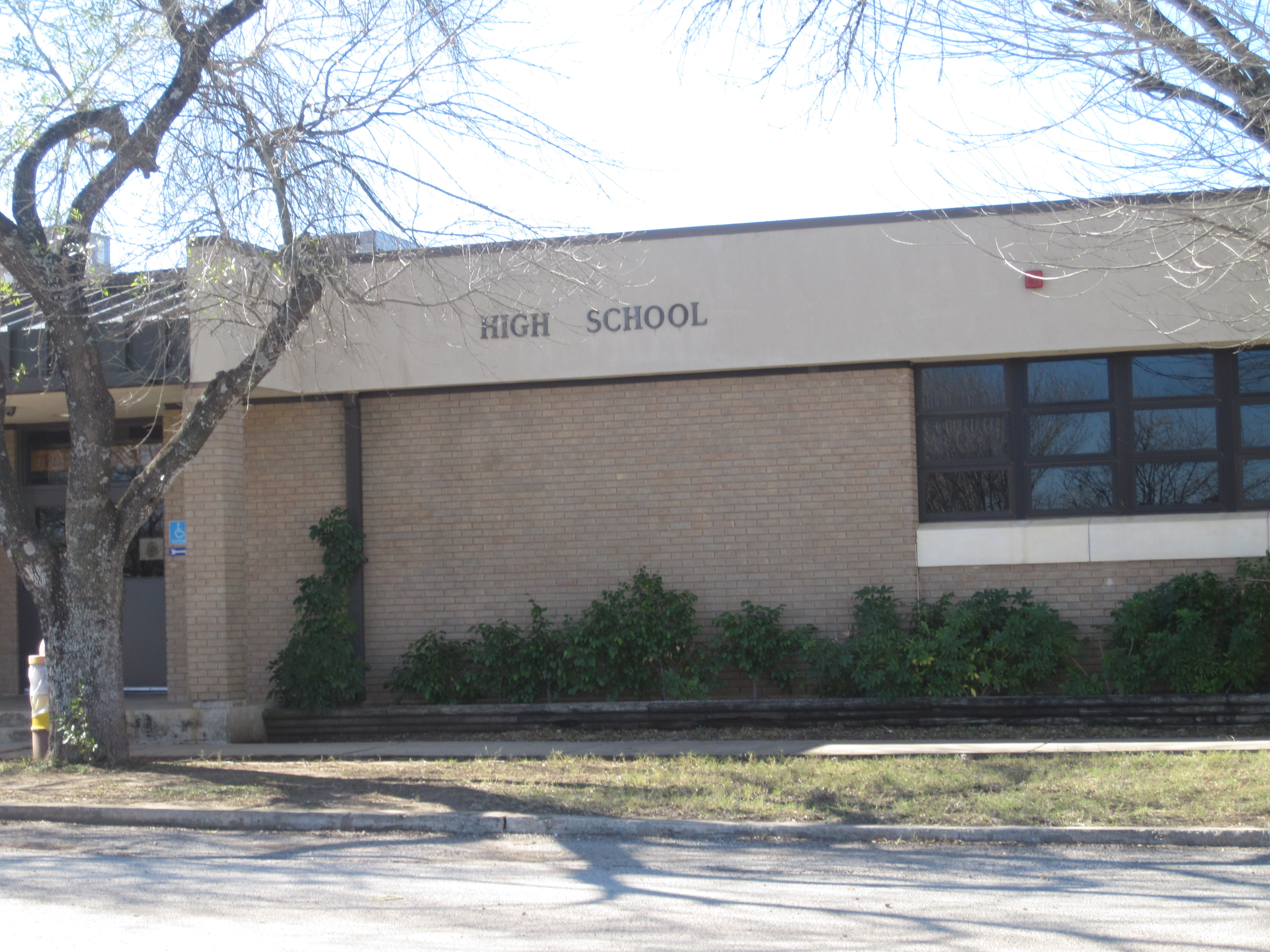
Charlotte High School is on the same campus as the primary and middle schools of the Charlotte Independent School District.

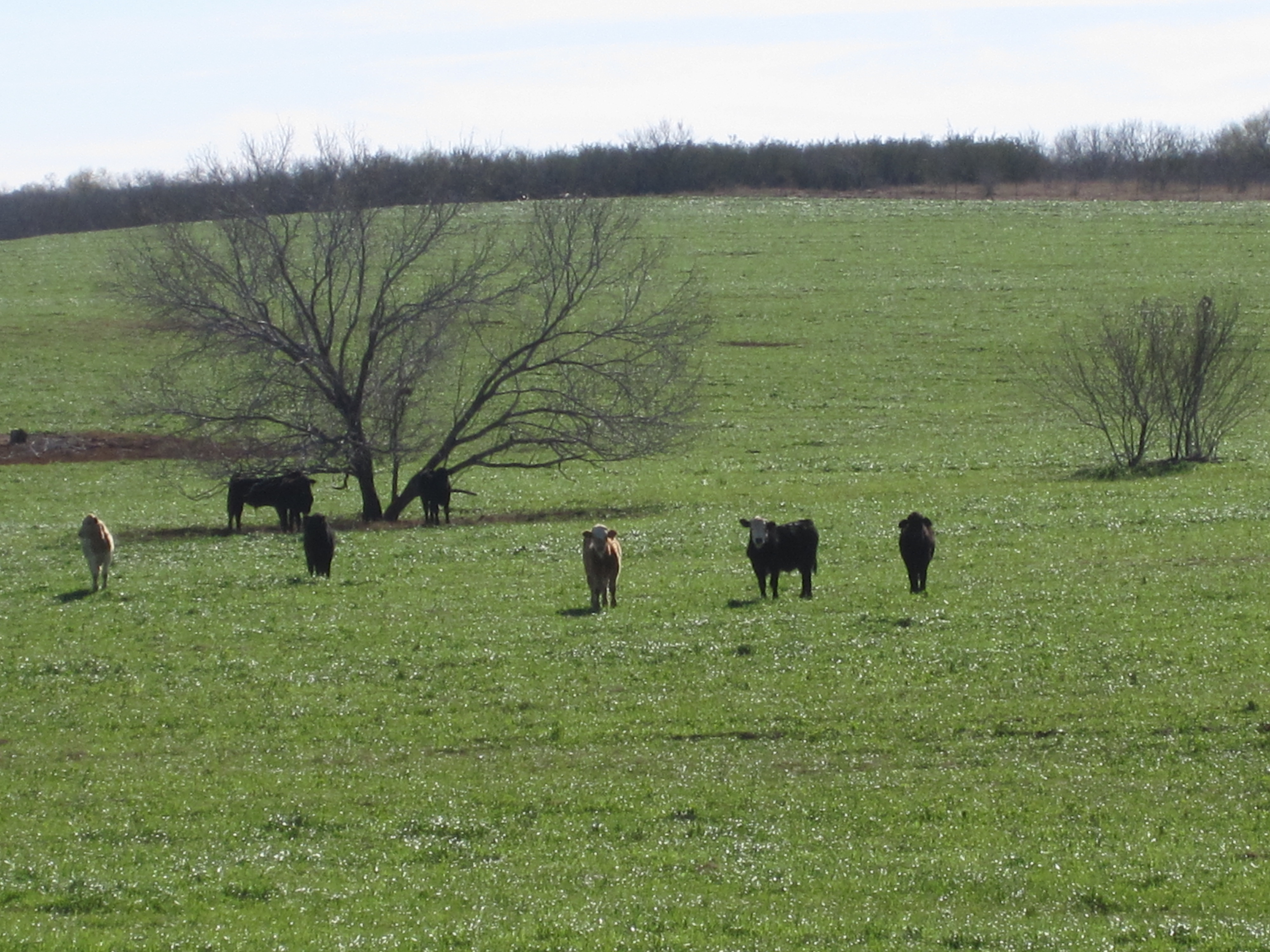
Cattle grazing off Texas State Highway 97 southwest of Charlotte

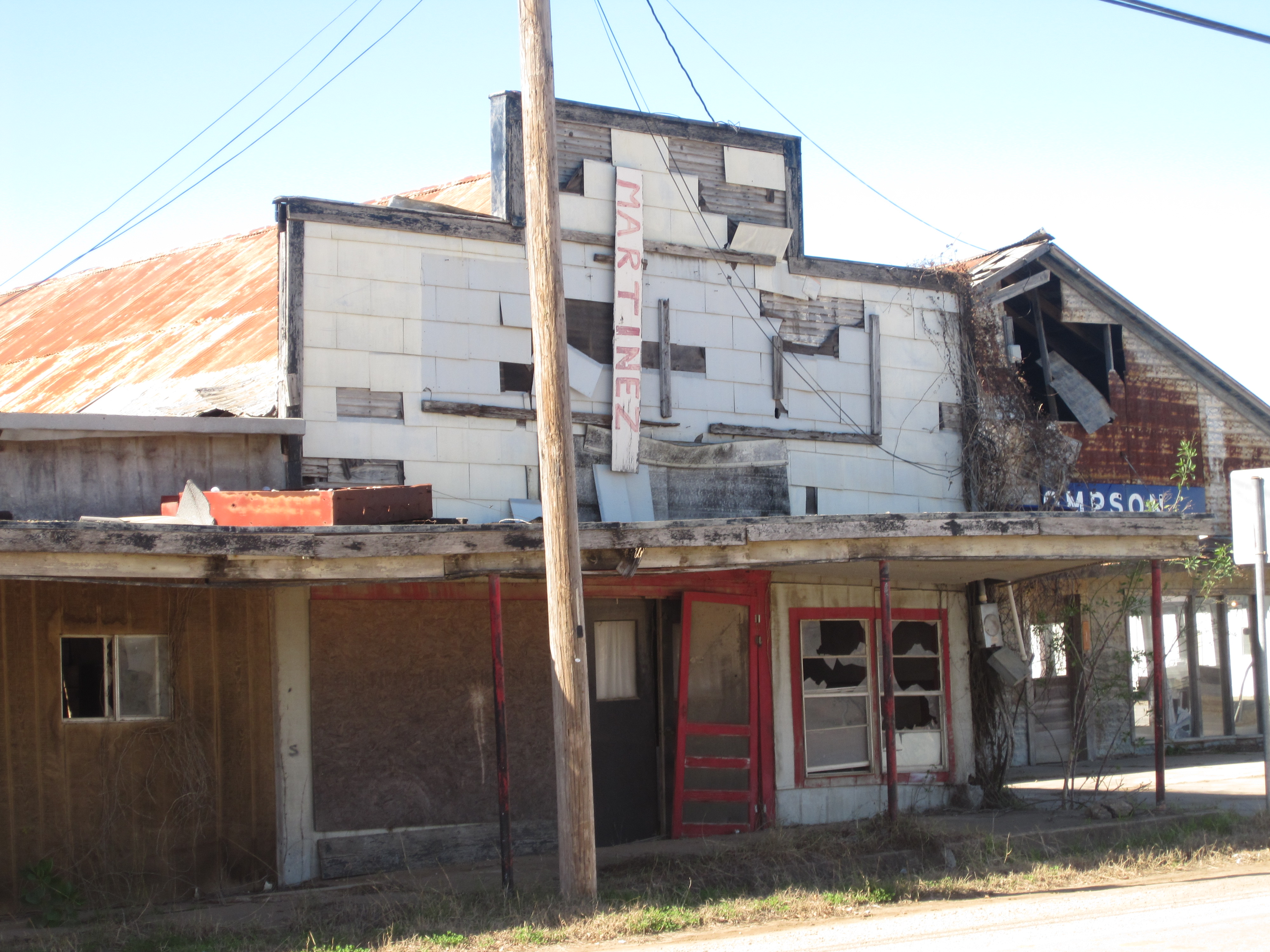
These are among some half-dozen abandoned buildings near City Hall in Charlotte.

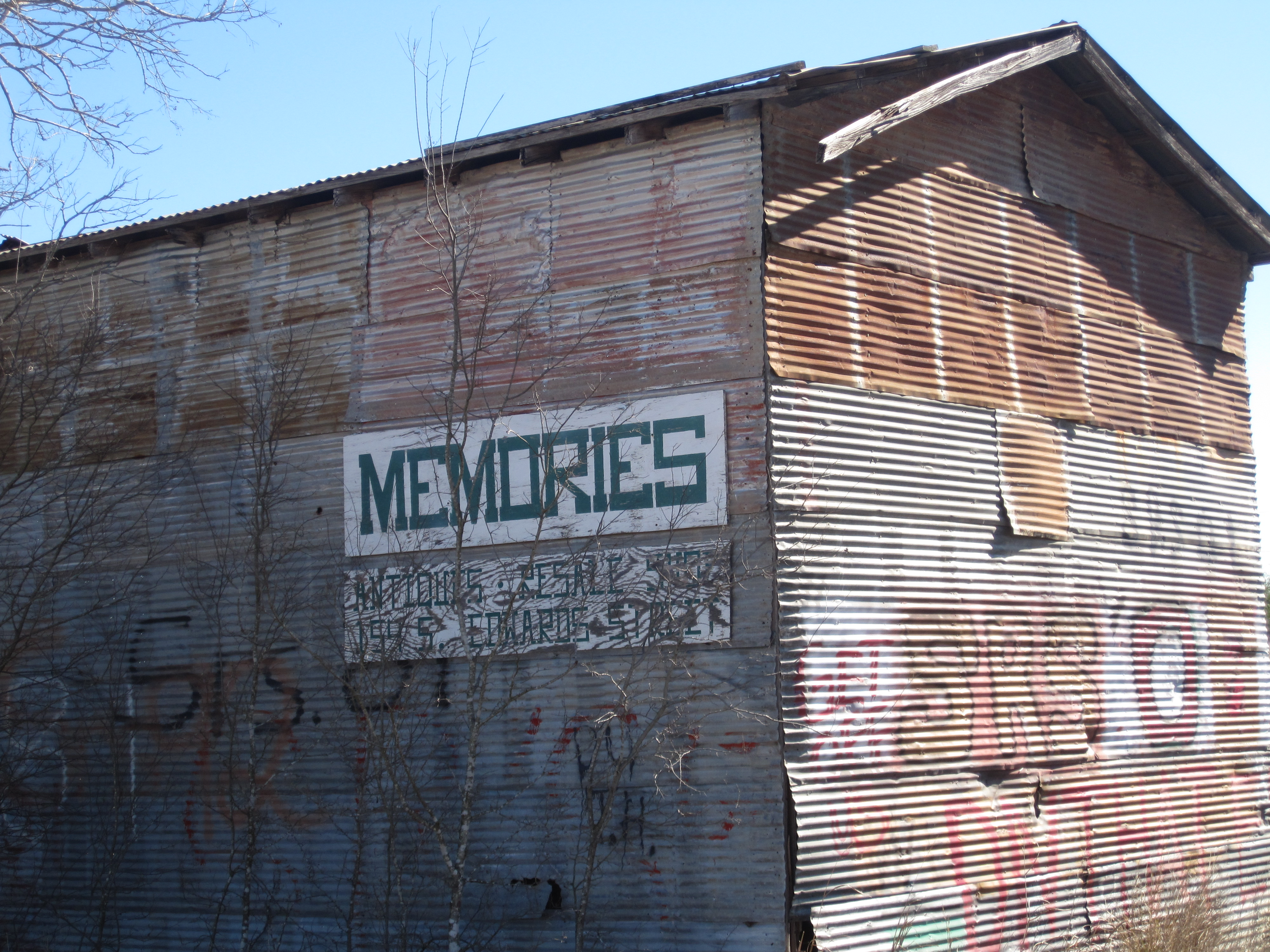
Someone inscribed "Memories" on this abandoned building outside Charlotte.

== See also ==
- List of municipalities in Texas
