= Charlotte Independent School District =

School district in Texas, United States

Coordinates: 28.856°N 98.716°W

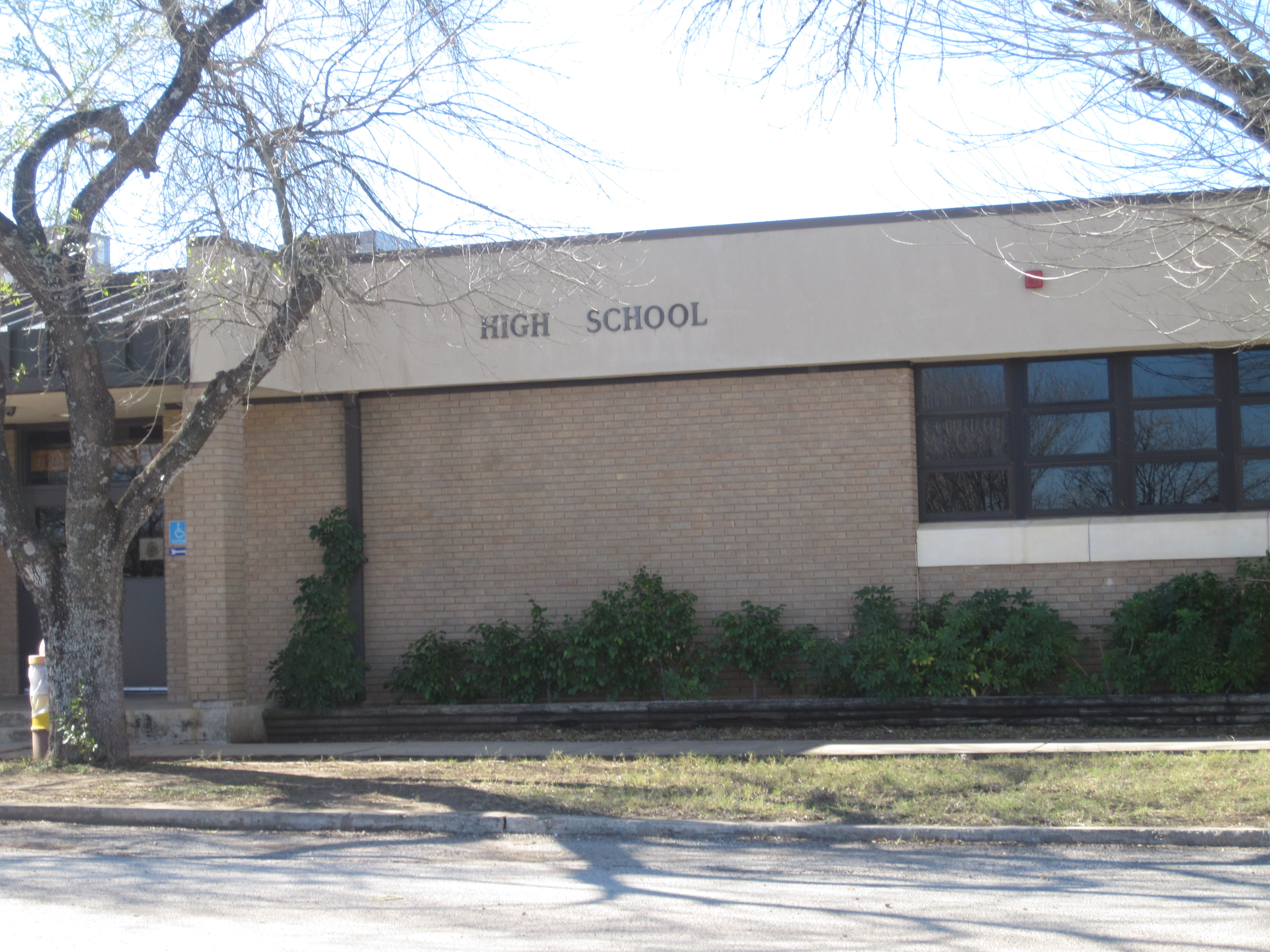
- Charlotte High School

Location
- Charlotte, Texas ESC Region 20 USA

District information
- Type: Public Independent school district
- Grades: EE through 12
- Superintendent: Mario Sotelo
- Schools: 5 (2011-12)
- NCES District ID: 4813710

Students and staff
- Students: 506 (2012-13)
- Teachers: 40.02 (2011-12) (on full-time equivalent (FTE) basis)
- Student–teacher ratio: 13.09 (2011-12)

Other information
- Website: Charlotte ISD

Charlotte Independent School District is a public school district based in Charlotte, Texas (USA). Located in Atascosa County, a small portion of the district extends into Frio County.

In 2009, the school district was rated "academically acceptable" by the Texas Education Agency.

School authorities provide websites to help students and parents find scholarships and financial aid.

== History ==
According to Dr. Guadalupe San Miguel, in Charlotte ISD, is where the first official legal complaint regarding racial segregation against Mexicans and Mexican Americans in Texas took place in 1928. The complaint was filed by Felipe Vela on behalf of his daughter, Amada Vela. Their racial segregation complaint reached the Texas State Board of Education and they sided with the Vela family.

== Schools ==
In the 2012-2013 school year, the district had students in five schools.

High schools

- Charlotte High School (Grades 9-12)

Middle schools

- Charlotte Junior High (Grades 5-8)

Elementary schools

- Charlotte Elementary (Grades EE-4)

Alternative schools

- Atascosa County Alternative School (Grades 6-12)
- District Reassignment and opportunity Center (Grades 6-12)
