= Poteet, Texas =

- City
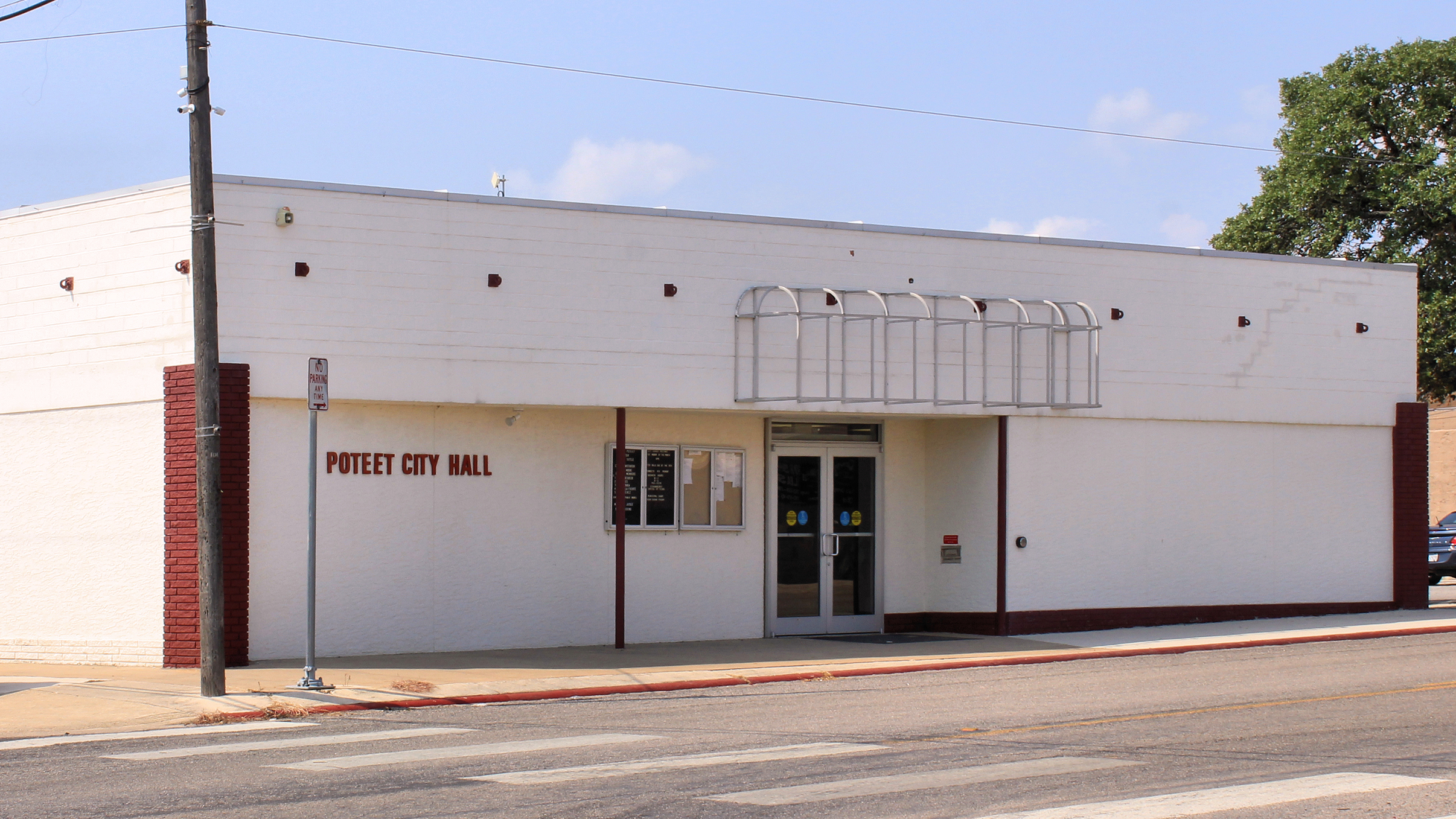
- Poteet City Hall
- Nickname: Strawberry Capital of Texas
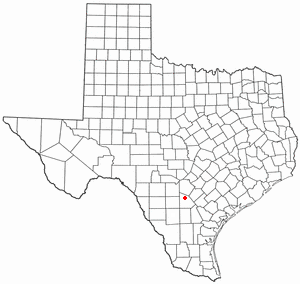
- Location of Poteet, Texas

- Coordinates: 29°02′14″N 98°34′22″W
- Country: United States
- State: Texas
- County: Atascosa
- Named for: Francis Marion Poteet

Area
  - Total: 1.73 sq mi (4.49 km^{2})
  - Land: 1.73 sq mi (4.49 km^{2})
  - Water: 0 sq mi (0.00 km^{2})
- Elevation: 436 ft (133 m)

Population (2020)
  - Total: 2,795
  - Density: 1,612.2/sq mi (622.49/km^{2})
- Time zone: UTC-6 (Central (CST))
  - Summer (DST): UTC-5 (CDT)
- ZIP code: 78065
- Area code: 830
- FIPS code: 48-59084
- GNIS feature ID: 2411477
- Website: www.poteettx.org

Poteet is a city in Atascosa County, Texas, United States. Its population was 2,795 as of the 2020 census. It is part of the San Antonio metropolitan statistical area. It was named for its first postmaster, Francis Marion Poteet. It is best known as the birthplace of country music legend George Strait.

Poteet is known for its Poteet Strawberry Festival. Poteet Canyon, Steve Canyon's ward in the long-running comic strip by Milton Caniff, is named after the town (and a mosaic of Poteet Canyon stands in front of the town's fire station).

== Geography ==
Poteet is located about 30 miles (48 km) south of downtown San Antonio.

According to the United States Census Bureau, the city has a total area of 1.7 square miles (4.4 km^{2}), all land.

=== Climate ===
Poteet has a humid subtropical climate (Köppen: Cfa) with long, hot summers and short, mild winters.

Climate data for Poteet, Texas (1991–2020 normals, extremes 1941–present)
Month	Jan	Feb	Mar	Apr	May	Jun	Jul	Aug	Sep	Oct	Nov	Dec	Year
Record high °F (°C)	96 (36)	98 (37)	100 (38)	109 (43)	110 (43)	107 (42)	110 (43)	110 (43)	112 (44)	112 (44)	98 (37)	90 (32)	112 (44)
Mean maximum °F (°C)	81.4 (27.4)	85.4 (29.7)	89.5 (31.9)	93.7 (34.3)	96.5 (35.8)	99.9 (37.7)	100.6 (38.1)	102.3 (39.1)	99.9 (37.7)	95.6 (35.3)	88.5 (31.4)	82.4 (28.0)	103.8 (39.9)
Mean daily maximum °F (°C)	65.9 (18.8)	70.1 (21.2)	75.9 (24.4)	82.4 (28.0)	88.3 (31.3)	93.9 (34.4)	96.3 (35.7)	97.6 (36.4)	92.0 (33.3)	84.7 (29.3)	74.9 (23.8)	66.7 (19.3)	82.4 (28.0)
Daily mean °F (°C)	53.3 (11.8)	57.4 (14.1)	63.9 (17.7)	70.3 (21.3)	77.4 (25.2)	82.9 (28.3)	85.1 (29.5)	85.6 (29.8)	80.7 (27.1)	72.2 (22.3)	62.1 (16.7)	54.4 (12.4)	70.4 (21.3)
Mean daily minimum °F (°C)	40.8 (4.9)	44.7 (7.1)	51.9 (11.1)	58.2 (14.6)	66.5 (19.2)	71.9 (22.2)	73.8 (23.2)	73.7 (23.2)	69.4 (20.8)	59.7 (15.4)	49.3 (9.6)	42.1 (5.6)	58.5 (14.7)
Mean minimum °F (°C)	25.7 (−3.5)	28.4 (−2.0)	33.6 (0.9)	41.3 (5.2)	51.1 (10.6)	63.8 (17.7)	68.1 (20.1)	67.8 (19.9)	57.4 (14.1)	41.5 (5.3)	32.0 (0.0)	27.2 (−2.7)	22.7 (−5.2)
Record low °F (°C)	−1 (−18)	5 (−15)	18 (−8)	30 (−1)	35 (2)	50 (10)	57 (14)	58 (14)	40 (4)	26 (−3)	22 (−6)	9 (−13)	−1 (−18)
Average precipitation inches (mm)	1.62 (41)	1.81 (46)	1.96 (50)	2.08 (53)	3.59 (91)	3.42 (87)	2.44 (62)	1.99 (51)	3.99 (101)	2.26 (57)	1.47 (37)	1.73 (44)	28.36 (720)
Average snowfall inches (cm)	0.0 (0.0)	0.0 (0.0)	0.0 (0.0)	0.0 (0.0)	0.0 (0.0)	0.0 (0.0)	0.0 (0.0)	0.0 (0.0)	0.0 (0.0)	0.0 (0.0)	0.0 (0.0)	0.0 (0.0)	0.0 (0.0)
Average precipitation days (≥ 0.01 in)	4.1	4.1	4.8	3.3	5.5	4.3	3.9	3.2	5.4	3.9	3.9	4.3	50.7
Average snowy days (≥ 0.1 in)	0.0	0.0	0.0	0.0	0.0	0.0	0.0	0.0	0.0	0.0	0.0	0.0	0.0
Source: NOAA

== Education ==
Poteet is served by the Poteet Independent School District, including Poteet High School.

== Demographics ==
Historical population
Census	Pop.	Note	%±
1930	1,231		—
1940	2,315		88.1%
1950	2,487		7.4%
1960	2,811		13.0%
1970	3,013		7.2%
1980	3,086		2.4%
1990	3,206		3.9%
2000	3,305		3.1%
2010	3,260		−1.4%
2020	2,795		−14.3%
U.S. Decennial Census

=== 2020 census ===
As of the 2020 census, Poteet had a population of 2,795. The median age was 35.1 years. 27.5% of residents were under the age of 18 and 15.5% of residents were 65 years of age or older. For every 100 females there were 92.1 males, and for every 100 females age 18 and over there were 89.3 males age 18 and over.

There were 963 households in Poteet, of which 37.0% had children under the age of 18 living in them. Of all households, 39.1% were married-couple households, 19.4% were households with a male householder and no spouse or partner present, and 32.8% were households with a female householder and no spouse or partner present. About 22.9% of all households were made up of individuals and 10.0% had someone living alone who was 65 years of age or older.

There were 1,081 housing units, of which 10.9% were vacant. The homeowner vacancy rate was 0.2% and the rental vacancy rate was 6.7%.

0.0% of residents lived in urban areas, while 100.0% lived in rural areas.

Racial composition as of the 2020 census
Race	Number	Percent
White	1,143	40.9%
Black or African American	21	0.8%
American Indian and Alaska Native	25	0.9%
Asian	1	0.0%
Native Hawaiian and Other Pacific Islander	0	0.0%
Some other race	389	13.9%
Two or more races	1,216	43.5%
Hispanic or Latino (of any race)	2,447	87.5%

=== 2000 census ===
As of the census of 2000, 3,305 people, 1,052 households, and 810 families resided in the city. The population density was 2,224.2 inhabitants per square mile (858.8/km^{2}). The 1,201 housing units averaged 808.2/sq mi (311.2/km^{2}). The racial makeup of the city was 64.99% White, 0.36% African American, 0.27% Native American, 30.11% from other races, and 4.27% from two or more races. Hispanics or Latinos of any race were 88.84% of the population.

Of the 1,052 households, 44.3% had children under 18 living with them, 47.1% were married couples living together, 23.7% had a female householder with no husband present, and 23.0% were not families. About 21.0% of all households were made up of individuals, and 11.8% had someone living alone who was 65 or older. The average household size was 3.11 and the average family size was 3.60.

In the city, the population was distributed as 34.6% under 18, 10.2% from 18 to 24, 25.6% from 25 to 44, 17.7% from 45 to 64, and 12.0% who were 65 or older. The median age was 29 years. For every 100 females, there were 90.8 males. For every 100 females age 18 and over, there were 83.5 males.

The median income for a household in the city was $25,329, and for a family was $27,949. Males had a median income of $23,929 versus $15,608 for females. The per capita income for the city was $9,368. About 23.6% of families and 28.0% of the population were below the poverty line, including 33.1% of those under age 18 and 29.7% of those age 65 or over.

== Notable people ==
- David Lee Garza, a Tejano music artist, was born in Poteet.
- George Strait, a country music singer, was born in Poteet.
