= Poteet Independent School District =

School district in Texas, United States

Location
- Poteet, Texas ESC Region 20 USA
- Coordinates: 29°02′28″N 98°34′10″W

District information
- Type: Public Independent school district
- Grades: EE through 12
- Superintendent: Charles Camarillo
- Schools: 5 (2023-24)
- Budget: $16,135,000
- NCES District ID: 4835520

Students and staff
- Students: 1680 (2023-24)
- Teachers: 119.86 (2011-12) (on full-time equivalent (FTE) basis)
- Student–teacher ratio: 13:1 (2023-24)

Other information
- Website: poteetisd.org

Poteet Independent School District is a public school district based in Poteet, in the U.S. state of Texas. In 2022, the school district was rated a "C" by the Texas Education Agency.

== Schools ==
The district has students in five schools.

Regular instructional schools

- Poteet High School (Grades 9–12)
- Poteet Junior High School (Grades 6–8)
- Poteet Intermediate School (Grades 4–5)
- Poteet Elementary School (Grades EE–3)

Alternative instructional schools

- Atascosa County Juvenile Unit (Grades 6-12)
