= Jourdanton, Texas =

- City
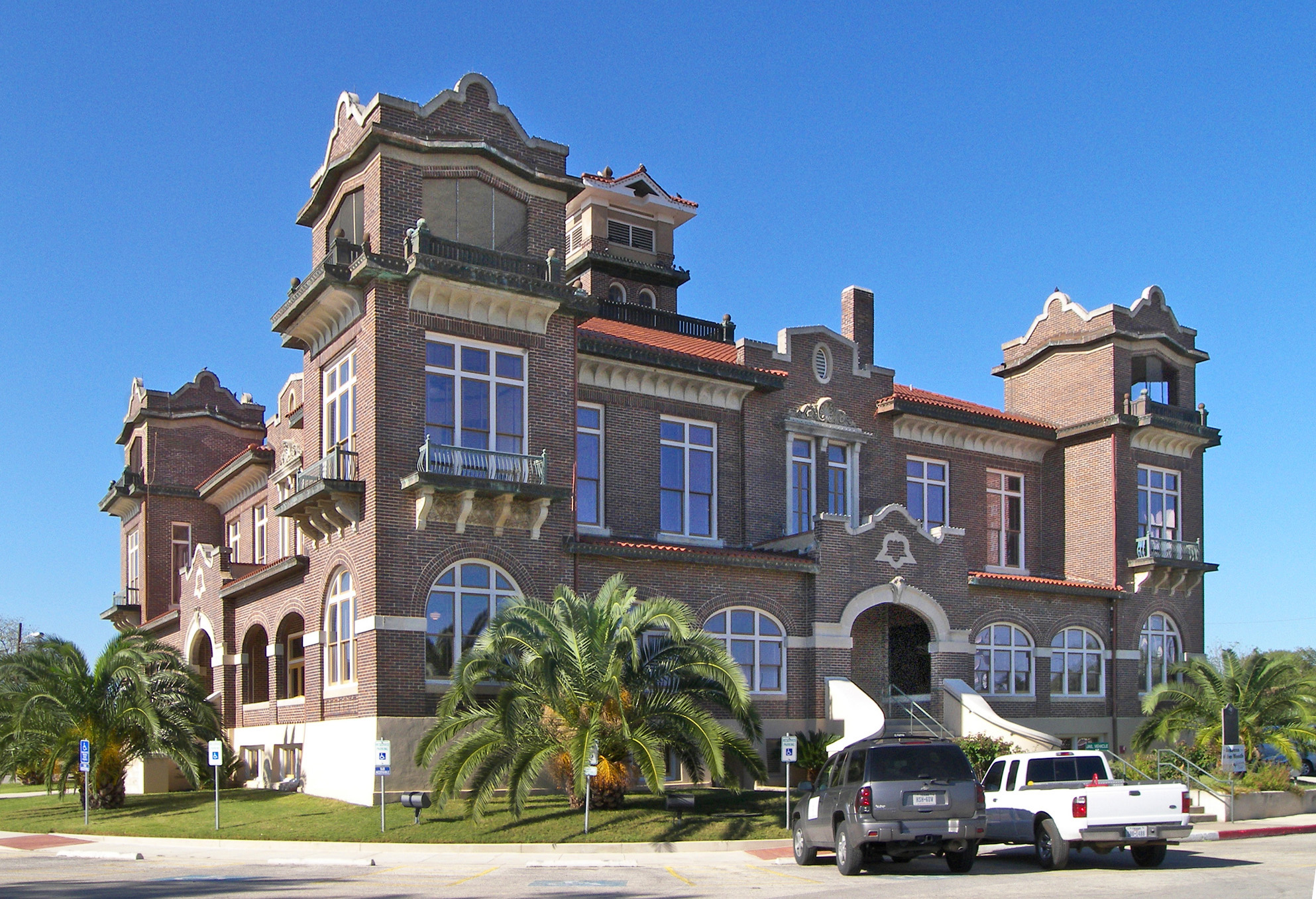
- Atascosa County Courthouse

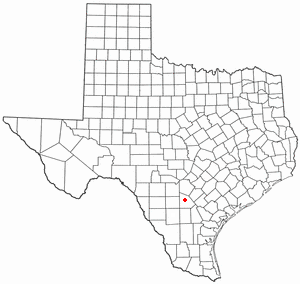
- Location of Jourdanton, Texas

- Coordinates: 28°54′50″N 98°32′27″W
- Country: United States
- State: Texas
- County: Atascosa
- Established: 1909

Area
  - Total: 3.58 sq mi (9.28 km^{2})
  - Land: 3.58 sq mi (9.28 km^{2})
  - Water: 0 sq mi (0.00 km^{2})
- Elevation: 489 ft (149 m)

Population (2020)
  - Total: 4,094
  - Density: 1,140/sq mi (441/km^{2})
- Time zone: UTC-6 (Central (CST))
  - Summer (DST): UTC-5 (CDT)
- ZIP code: 78026
- Area code: 830
- FIPS code: 48-38116
- GNIS feature ID: 2410153
- Website: jourdantontexas.org

Jourdanton (/ˈdʒɜːrdəntən/ JUR-dən-tən) is a city in and the county seat of Atascosa County, Texas, United States. As of the 2020 census, Jourdanton had a population of 4,094. It is part of the San Antonio metropolitan area.

== History ==
Jourdanton was founded in 1909 and was named after founder Jourdan Campbell. The county seat was moved from Pleasanton to Jourdanton in 1910.

== Geography ==
Jourdanton is located near the center of Atascosa County approximately 37 miles (60 km) south of downtown San Antonio. At the center of the city is the intersection of Texas State Highways 16 and 97. Highway 16 leads north to San Antonio and south 165 miles (266 km) to Zapata near the Mexican border. Highway 97 leads northeast 4 miles (6 km) to Pleasanton and 28 miles (45 km) to Floresville, and southwest 67 miles (108 km) to Cotulla.

According to the United States Census Bureau, Jourdanton has a total area of 3.5 square miles (9.1 km^{2}), all land.

== Demographics ==
Historical population
| Census | Pop. | Note | %± |
|---|---|---|---|
| 1920 | 682 | | — |
| 1930 | 767 | | 12.5% |
| 1940 | 950 | | 23.9% |
| 1950 | 1,481 | | 55.9% |
| 1960 | 1,504 | | 1.6% |
| 1970 | 1,841 | | 22.4% |
| 1980 | 2,743 | | 49.0% |
| 1990 | 3,220 | | 17.4% |
| 2000 | 3,732 | | 15.9% |
| 2010 | 3,871 | | 3.7% |
| 2020 | 4,094 | | 5.8% |
U.S. Decennial Census

=== 2020 census ===
As of the 2020 census, there were 4,094 people, 1,465 households, and 1,039 families residing in the city. The median age was 37.2 years, with 27.2% of residents under the age of 18 and 16.3% of residents 65 years of age or older. For every 100 females there were 90.3 males, and for every 100 females age 18 and over there were 84.7 males age 18 and over.

91.9% of residents lived in urban areas, while 8.1% lived in rural areas.

There were 1,465 households in Jourdanton, of which 39.1% had children under the age of 18 living in them. Of all households, 45.8% were married-couple households, 15.6% were households with a male householder and no spouse or partner present, and 32.2% were households with a female householder and no spouse or partner present. About 25.4% of all households were made up of individuals and 13.9% had someone living alone who was 65 years of age or older.

There were 1,623 housing units, of which 9.7% were vacant. The homeowner vacancy rate was 0.7% and the rental vacancy rate was 6.3%.

Racial composition as of the 2020 census
| Race | Number | Percent |
|---|---|---|
| White | 2,698 | 65.9% |
| Black or African American | 34 | 0.8% |
| American Indian and Alaska Native | 31 | 0.8% |
| Asian | 17 | 0.4% |
| Native Hawaiian and Other Pacific Islander | 2 | 0.0% |
| Some other race | 467 | 11.4% |
| Two or more races | 845 | 20.6% |
| Hispanic or Latino (of any race) | 2,317 | 56.6% |

=== 2010 census ===
At the 2010 census, 3,871 people, 1,187 households, and 923 families were living in the city. The population density was 1,071.1 inhabitants per square mile (413.6/km^{2}). The 1,353 housing units had an average density of 388.3 per square mile (149.9/km^{2}). The racial makeup of the city was 74.44% White, 1.13% African American, 0.96% Native American, 0.29% Asian, 0.03% Pacific Islander, 20.42% from other races, and 2.73% from two or more races. Hispanics or Latinos of any race were 52.87%.

Of the 1,187 households, 44.4% had children under 18 living with them, 58.5% were married couples living together, 15.2% had a female householder with no husband present, and 22.2% were not families. About 19.9% of households were one person and 9.5% were one person 65 or older. The average household size was 2.98, and the average family size was 3.42.

The age distribution was 32.2% under 18, 9.0% from 18 to 24, 29.4% from 25 to 44, 18.6% from 45 to 64, and 10.8% were 65 or older. The median age was 31 years. For every 100 females, there were 95.5 males. For every 100 females age 18 and over, there were 92.3 males.

The median household income was $34,975 and the median family income was $38,389. Males had a median income of $30,222 versus $16,313 for females. The per capita income for the city was $16,910. About 12.4% of families and 13.4% of the population were below the poverty line, including 13.1% of those under age 18 and 19.3% of those age 65 or over.

== Education ==
Jourdanton is served by the Jourdanton Independent School District and home to the Jourdanton High School Indians and Squaws.

== Climate ==
The climate in this area is characterized by hot, humid summers and generally mild to cool winters. According to the Köppen climate classification, Jourdanton has a humid subtropical climate, Cfa on climate maps.
