= List of secondary school sports team names and mascots derived from Indigenous peoples =

Secondary schools with Native American mascots

Among the categories of names for sports teams in the United States and Canada, those referring to Indigenous peoples are lesser in popularity only to the names of various animals. In a list of the top 100 team names, "Indians" is 15th, "Braves" is 40th, "Chiefs" is 60th. The typical logo is an image of a stereotypical Native American man in profile, wearing a Plains Indians headdress; and are often cartoons or caricatures. Other imagery include dreamcatchers, feathers, spears, and arrows. Individual schools may have performance traditions, such as the tomahawk chop, a mascot or cheerleaders in stereotypical Native attire, and chants adapted from Hollywood movies. These fictional representations stand in the way of any authentic understanding of contemporary Indigenous peoples, and promote racism.

The documents often cited to justifying the trend for change are an advisory opinion by the United States Commission on Civil Rights in 2001 and a resolution by the American Psychological Association in 2005. Both support the views of Native American organizations and individuals that such mascots maintain harmful stereotypes that are discriminatory and cause harm by distorting the past and preventing understanding of Native American/First Nations peoples in the present.

The trend towards the elimination of Indigenous names and mascots in local schools has been steady, with two-thirds having been eliminated during the 50 years prior to 2013 according to the National Congress of American Indians (NCAI). In more recent years, the trend has accelerated, particularly in July 2020, following a wave of racial awareness and reforms in wake of national protests after the murder of George Floyd, and the decision by the Washington Commanders to change their Redskins name and logo.

In a few states with significant Native American populations; such as Colorado, Maine, Nevada, Oregon, Washington, and Wisconsin, change has been mandated by law. A law was passed in Connecticut which withholds tribal funding provided by casino revenue from any school that retains a Native mascots after July 1, 2022. Most have complied, but as of 2025, three school districts had decided to keep their mascots; Derby Red Raiders, Windsor Warriors and Nonnewaug High School Chiefs.

The school board in Cambridge, New York voted in June 2021 to eliminate the name and logo of the Cambridge High School "Indians". After the seating of two new members, the board voted to reverse this decision in July 2021. A group of parents favoring removal filed an appeal to the New York State Department of Education which issued an order requiring removal of the mascot or lose state funding. This order applies only to Cambridge, although there are 70 schools in the state that have Native mascots. In a final order, the state Education Commissioner ordered the school to eliminate the mascot by July 1, 2022, citing the evidence that Native mascots "inhibits the creation of 'a safe and supportive environment' for all students". The school board voted 3–2 to file an appeal with the state Supreme Court, arguing that the state Education Commissioner's order singles out Cambridge while allowing other schools to maintain their mascots. It is the state's position that the order to remove the Cambridge mascot alone is in support of the prior board's decision. In December 2023, the New York Supreme Court, Appellate Division unanimously dismissed the appeal as "moot."

The list below for secondary schools in the United States and Canada remains substantial, with 358 teams currently calling themselves "Indians", 158 "Warriors" using Indigenous imagery (there are many with the name using generic, Greek or Roman mascots), 108 "Braves", 61 "Chiefs", and 33 "Redskins". The latter has shown the greatest decline, due to an association with the Washington Redskins name controversy. Since the NFL team began the process of changing its name to the Washington Commanders, twelve high schools previously using the name also changed. Snell Middle School in Bayard, New Mexico also dropped the name.

== Current usage ==
The following schools are listed in alphabetical order by team name:

=== Apaches ===
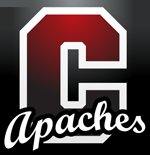
Centennial High School

- Antonian College Preparatory High School, San Antonio, Texas – a co-educational Catholic high school
- Arcadia High School, Arcadia, California
- Arcola Intermediate School, Eagleville, Pennsylvania
- Arlington Country Day School, Jacksonville, Florida – private college-prep K–12
- Centennial High School, Compton, California
- Fairview High School, Sherwood, Defiance County, Ohio
- Fort Thomas High School, Fort Thomas, Arizona – 93% Native American, adjacent to San Carlos Apache Indian Reservation
- Glenbrook School, Minden, Louisiana – The school was established as a segregation academy when the public Minden High School was desegregated in 1966. While now asserting its nondiscriminatory status, the school remains 92.8 percent white, with no Native American students. Glenbrook has an annual "Apache Princess" pageant.
- Gonzales High School, Gonzales, Texas
- Nogales High School, Nogales, Arizona
- Pottsville High School, Pottsville, Arkansas
- Sanger Union High School, Sanger, California
- Wabash High School, Wabash, Indiana

=== Arrows ===
The following use Native American arrows, feathers, or arrowheads in their logos:

- Ashland High School, Ashland, Ohio
- Clinton High School, Clinton, Mississippi
- Lancaster High School, Lancaster, Wisconsin - All schools in the district are the "Flying Arrows".
- Pipestone Area High School, Pipestone, Minnesota - Entire school district is the Arrows with a crossed-arrow logo.
- Preble Shawnee High School, Camden, Ohio - Entire school district is the Arrows.
- Sachem High School East, Farmingville, New York
- Sachem High School North, Lake Ronkonkoma, New York - (Flaming Arrows)
- Tecumseh High School, New Carlisle, Ohio
- Watertown High School, Watertown, South Dakota – The prior use of faux Native American costumes was removed from the homecoming festival in 2016, but the arrow in some logos remains.

=== Aztec(s) ===
- Ánimo Leadership Charter High School, Inglewood, California
- Assabet Valley Regional Technical High School, Marlborough, Massachusetts
- Azusa High School, Azusa, California - Azusa Unified School District is debating mascot.
- Barstow High School, Barstow, California
- Copper Canyon High School, Glendale, Arizona
- Corona del Sol High School, Tempe, Arizona
- El Dorado High School, El Paso, Texas
- Esperanza High School, Anaheim, California
- Farmersville High School, Farmersville, California
- Frontier High School, Whittier, California
- La Quinta High School, Westminster, California
- Mark Keppel High School, Alhambra, California
- Mendota Junior High School, Mendota, California
- Montgomery High School, San Diego, California
- Palm Desert High School, Palm Desert, California
- Soledad High School, Soledad, California
- Yerba Buena High School, San Jose, California – mascot: Aztec Warrior
- William Moreno Junior High School, Calexico, California

=== Big Reds ===
- Bellaire High School, Bellaire, Ohio - Uses Indian head logo
- Centerville High School, Centerville, Iowa
- Chippewa Valley High School, Clinton Township, Macomb County, Michigan
- Missouri Valley High School, Missouri Valley, Iowa
- Parkersburg High School, Parkersburg, West Virginia
- West Middlesex Jr/Sr High School, West Middlesex, Pennsylvania - Logo is a Native American in a headdress. Girls teams are Ms. Reds.

=== Blackhawks ===
Most of the schools with the name use a bird logo, therefore are not directly derived from an Indigenous people although there may be an indirect reference to Chief Black Hawk. The following use Native American images/symbols:

- Adrian High School, Adrian, Missouri
- Baldwin-Woodville Area High School, Baldwin, Wisconsin
- Cheney High School, Cheney, Washington
- Cowan High School, Muncie, Indiana
- Fort Atkinson High School, Fort Atkinson, Wisconsin
- Prairie du Chien High School, Prairie du Chien, Wisconsin
- Stockton High School, Stockton, Illinois
- West Aurora High School, Aurora, Illinois
- Westville High School, New Durham Township, LaPorte County, Indiana

=== Brave(s) ===
- Absegami High School, Galloway Township, New Jersey
- Alakanuk High School, Alakanuk, Alaska – 95% Alaskan Native
- Alta Loma High School, Rancho Cucamonga, California
- Annawan High School, Annawan, Illinois
- Badger High School, Kinsman, Ohio
- Baker High School, Baker, California
- Baldwin High School, Milledgeville, Georgia – A Mascot Advisory Committee was formed by the Baldwin County Board of Education. After a year of discussion the Board of Education has decided to retain the "Braves" mascot name but remove some of the stereotypical imagery.
- Baldwin Park High School, Baldwin Park, California
- Banks High School, Banks, Oregon
- Bartram High School, Philadelphia
- Battle Creek Jr/Sr High School, Battle Creek, Nebraska – Girls teams are the "Bravettes".
- Bellmont High School, Decatur, Indiana – Girls teams are the "Squaws".
- Belmont High School, Belmont, Wisconsin
- Benson High School, Benson, Minnesota
- Bishop Blanchet High School, Seattle, Washington
- Blackhawk Christian School, Fort Wayne, Indiana – a K–12 school operated by a fundamentalist Christian ministry
- Bonner Springs High School, Bonner Springs, Kansas
- Borden Jr/Sr High School, Sellersburg, Indiana
- Bottineau High School, Bottineau, North Dakota
- Brebeuf Jesuit Preparatory School, Indianapolis, Indiana
- Bradford Central High School, Bradford, New York
- Bremen High School, Midlothian, Illinois
- Bridgeport Middle School, Bridgeport, West Virginia
- Britton-Hecla High School, Britton, South Dakota
- Brownstown Central High School, Brownstown, Indiana
- Carey Junior High School, Cheyenne, Wyoming
- Cherokee High School, Cherokee, North Carolina – Operated by the Eastern Band of Cherokee Indians
- Central High School, Tulsa, Oklahoma
- Cheyenne-Eagle Butte School, North Eagle Butte, South Dakota – Operated by the Cheyenne River Indian Reservation
- Chemawa Indian High School, Salem, Oregon
- Cheraw High School, Cheraw, South Carolina
- Chopticon High School, Morganza, Maryland
- Community High School, Nevada, Texas
- Collidge Middle School, Granite City, Illinois
- Council Grove High School, Council Grove, Kansas
- El Cajon Valley High School, El Cajon, California
- Flathead High School, Kalispell, Montana
- Fort Wayne Blackhawk Christian High School, Fort Wayne, Indiana
- Gettysburg Area Middle School, Gettysburg, Pennsylvania – High School is the Warriors
- Gladstone Area High School, Gladstone, Michigan
- Granite Baptist High School, Glen Burnie, Maryland
- Grant County High School, Dry Ridge, Kentucky
- Gustine Middle School, Gustine, California
- H. L. Bourgeois High School, Gray, Louisiana
- Hamilton Union High School, Hamilton City, California
- Heard County High School, Franklin, Georgia
- Hoonah High School, Hoonah, Alaska – Native Americans are a majority of the population
- Indian Creek Senior High School, Trafalgar, Indiana
- Indian Hill High School, Cincinnati, Ohio
- Indian Hills High School, Oakland, New Jersey
- Indian River High School, Chesapeake, Virginia
- Indian Valley High School, Gnadenhutten, Ohio
- Iraan High School, Iraan, Texas
- Iroquois High School, Erie, Pennsylvania
- Justin-Siena High School, Napa, California
- Kamiakin High School, Kennewick, Washington – Following the 2021 Washington State law, Kamiakin sought the approval of the Confederated Tribes and Bands of the Yakama Nation to retain their mascot based upon their curriculum which includes tribal history, culture and government. Not having notification of an agreement, and with the approach of the legislative deadline, the school district is making contingency plans to change the name.
- La Conner High School, La Conner, Washington
- Lake Gibson High School, Lakeland, Florida
- Logan Elm High School, Circleville, Ohio
- Lompoc High School, Lompoc, California
- Maconaquah High School, Bunker Hill, Indiana
- Mandan High School, Mandan, North Dakota
- Manalapan High School, Englishtown, New Jersey
- Marty Indian High School, Marty, South Dakota – Operated by the Yankton Sioux Tribe
- Menahga High School, Menahga, Minnesota
- Modoc High School, Alturas, California
- Montezuma High School, Montezuma, Iowa
- Mount Zion High School, Mt. Zion, Illinois
- Mt. Edgecumbe High School, Sitka, Alaska
- Newton High School, Newton, New Jersey
- Noli Indian High School, San Jacinto, California
- Norte Vista High School, Riverside, California
- North Summit High School, Coalville, Utah
- Northern Secondary School, Sturgeon Falls, Ontario
- Octorara Area High School, Atglen, Pennsylvania
- Olentangy High School, Lewis Center, Ohio
- Owyhee High School, Owyhee, Nevada – Operated by the Duck Valley Indian Reservation
- Parshall High School, Parshall, North Dakota – Located on the Fort Berthold Indian Reservation
- Pequea Valley High School, Kinzers, Pennsylvania
- Potter Junior High School, Fallbrook, California
- Reedsport Community Charter School, Reedsport, Oregon
- Riverside Indian School, Anadarko, Oklahoma
- Sacajawea Junior High School, Lewiston, Idaho
- St. John Bosco High School, Bellflower, California
- St. Labre Indian Catholic High School, Ashland, Montana
- San Carlos High School, San Carlos, Arizona – Located on the San Carlos Apache Indian Reservation
- Santa Fe Indian School, Santa Fe, New Mexico
- Scott County Central High School, Sikeston, Missouri
- Shabbona Middle School, Morris, Illinois
- Shawnee High School, Springfield, Ohio – Superintendent states “We adjusted our logo based on the feedback we received, and we also have hosted an assembly where a member of the Shawnee tribe engaged with our students about the tribe's values, heritage and history,”.
- Shikellamy High School, Sunbury, Pennsylvania
- Smithville High School, Smithville, Oklahoma
- Socastee High School, Socastee, South Carolina
- South Jones High School, Ellisville, Mississippi
- Star Valley High School, Afton, Wyoming
- Tawas Area High School, Tawas City, Michigan
- Tecumseh Junior – Senior High School, Lynnville, Indiana
- South Vigo Senior High, Terre Haute, Indiana
- Terry Parker High School, Jacksonville, Florida
- Tishomingo County High School, Iuka, Mississippi
- Tomales High School, Tomales, California
- Turtle Mountain Community Schools, Belcourt, North Dakota – Operated by the Turtle Mountain Band of Chippewa Indians
- Union County High School, Morganfield, Kentucky – Girls teams are the "Bravettes".
- Walton High School, DeFuniak Springs, Florida
- Warrior Academy High School, Eutaw, Alabama
- Whetstone High School, Columbus, Ohio
- William R. Boone High School, Orlando, Florida
- Williamstown High School, Williamstown, New Jersey

=== Brownies ===
- Agawam High School, Agawam, Massachusetts - With controversy going back decades, the Town Council again voted to retain the Native American imagery associated with their mascot in 2020, disregarding the national trend.

=== Cherokees ===
- Greenback High School, Greenback, Tennessee
- Kendrick High School, Columbus, Georgia
- McMinn County High School, Athens, Tennessee
- Morgan Township Middle-High School, Valparaiso, Indiana
- South-Doyle High School, Knoxville, Tennessee

=== Chickasaws ===
- Blytheville High School, Blytheville, Arkansas
- New Hampton High School, New Hampton, Iowa

=== Chiefs ===
- Berryhill High School, Tulsa, Oklahoma – Home of the Chiefs and Maidens
- Big Foot High School, Walworth, Wisconsin
- Buena Regional High School, Buena, New Jersey
- Canarsie High School, Brooklyn, New York
- Capac Jr/Sr High School, Capac, Michigan
- Cardinal Gibbons High School, Fort Lauderdale, Florida – Changed from Redskins to Chiefs in 2006, retaining logo.
- Carlisle School, Martinsville, Virginia – private school
- Cheboygan Area High School, Cheboygan, Michigan
- Cherokee High School, Cherokee, Oklahoma
- Cherokee High School, Burlington County, New Jersey
- Cherokee High School, Rogersville, Tennessee
- Cornell High School, Cornell, Wisconsin – In response to changes at other schools, the Cornell district supervisor stated it is a non-issue locally, and that there are no plans to change the nickname, although the imagery was modified a few years ago.
- Craigmont High School, Memphis, Tennessee
- Crazy Horse High School, Wanblee, South Dakota – Native school
- Crosbyton High School, Crosbyton, Texas
- Deer Creek Mackinaw High School, Mackinaw, Illinois
- Donna North High School, Donna, Texas
- Gaffney Middle School, Gaffney, South Carolina
- Hopatcong High School, Hopatcong, New Jersey
- Hubbard High School, Courtland, Alabama
- Huron High School, New Boston, Michigan – With the widespread attention to systemic racism, Native American mascots are being questioned, including by alumni of Huron HS.
- Iroquois Middle/High School, Iroquois, South Dakota
- J.D. Meisler Middle School, Metairie, Louisiana
- James Caldwell High School, West Caldwell, New Jersey
- Kempsville High School, Virginia Beach, Virginia
- Keokuk High School, Keokuk, Iowa
- Kickapoo High School, Springfield, Missouri – While retaining the name, some imagery and performances have been removed.
- Lake View High School, San Angelo, Texas – The girls' teams are the Maidens.
- Lakeland School District, Lackawanna County, Pennsylvania
- Lakeside High School, Eufaula, Alabama
- Magnolia Heights High School, Senatobia, Mississippi
- Massapequa High School, Massapequa, New York
- McCormick High School, McCormick, South Carolina
- McIntosh High School, Peachtree City, Georgia
- Mescalero Apache High/Mid School, Mescalero, New Mexico – Town population is 90% Native American.
- Metlakatla High School, Metlakatla, Alaska – Alaska Native population.
- Miami Carol City Senior High School, Miami, Florida
- Monacan High School, Richmond, Virginia
- Natchitoches Central High School, Natchitoches, Louisiana
- Nonnewaug High School, Woodbury, Connecticut
- North Jackson High School, Stevenson, Alabama
- North Myrtle Beach High School, Little River, South Carolina
- Northview High School, Century, Florida
- Omaha Nation Public Schools, Macy, Nebraska – Operated by the Omaha Reservation
- Pelahatchie High School, Pelahatchie, Mississippi
- Piscataway High School, Piscataway, New Jersey
- Ronan High School, Ronan, Montana – Located on the Flathead Indian Reservation
- Santa Fe High School, Alma, Missouri
- Santa Fe High School, Santa Fe Springs, California
- Santaluces Community High School, Lantana, Florida
- Sequoyah High School, Hickory Flat, Georgia
- Shiocton High School, Shiocton, Wisconsin
- Shoshone Bannock Jr./Sr. High School, Fort Hall, Idaho – Located on the Fort Hall Indian Reservation
- Sir John A. McDonald Secondary School, Hamilton, Ontario
- Tensas Academy, St. Joseph, Louisiana – a private pre-K through 12 school
- Tylertown High School, Tylertown, Mississippi
- Waukomis High School, Waukomis, Oklahoma
- West Ouachita High School, West Monroe, Louisiana
- White Pigeon Jr/Sr High School, White Pigeon, Michigan
- Wisconsin Dells High School, Wisconsin Dells, Wisconsin
- Wyoming Indian High School, Ethete, Wyoming – Located on the Wind River Indian Reservation

=== Chieftains ===
- Bellefontaine High School, Bellefontaine, Ohio
- Bellevue East High School, Bellevue, Nebraska
- Bluejacket High School, Bluejacket, Oklahoma
- Bristol County Agricultural High School, Dighton, Massachusetts
- Calumet High School, Calumet, Oklahoma
- Chickasaw High School, Chickasaw, Alabama
- Clairemont High School, Clairemont, California
- Clark Intermediate School, Clovis, California - Anticipating the enforcement of the California Racial Mascots Act, Clark Intermediate announced in December, 2025 that their mascot would change from Chieftains to Cougars. Only days later the North Fork Rancheria of Mono Indians of California announced that it would concent, as provided by the law, to having the school retain the Chieftains mascot.
- Comstock High School, Comstock, Michigan
- Crow Creek High School, Stephan, South Dakota
- Dowagiac High School, Dowagiac, Michigan – In October 2023 the Tribal Council of the Pokagon Band of Potawatomi Indians ended its agreement approving use of the Chieftain mascot.
- Friona High School, Friona, Texas
- Graham-Dustin High School, Weleetka, Oklahoma
- Green Mountain High School, Chester, Vermont – The school board decision to retain the name has been appealed by three residents to the Vermont Agency of Education.
- Hopewell-Loudon High School, Bascom, Ohio
- Irwin County High School, Ocilla, Georgia
- Klawock High School, Klawock, Alaska
- Logan High School, Logan, Ohio
- Masconomet Regional High School, Boxford, Massachusetts
- Okolona High School, Okolona, Mississippi
- Osceola High School, Osceola, Wisconsin
- Palma High School, Salinas, California
- Ponaganset High School, North Scituate, Rhode Island
- Potosi High School, Potosi, Wisconsin
- Riverdale High School, Muscoda, Wisconsin
- Rogue River High School, Rogue River, Oregon
- Sapulpa High School, Sapulpa, Oklahoma
- Selfridge High School, Selfridge, North Dakota – Located on the Standing Rock Indian Reservation
- Seminole High School, Seminole, Oklahoma
- Sierra High School, Tollhouse, California
- Shiprock High School, Shiprock, New Mexico – (Public High School mostly Navajo)
- South Barber High School, Kiowa, Kansas
- Utica High School, Utica, Michigan
- West Cottonwood Junior High School, Cottonwood, California
- Wetumka High School, Wetumka, Oklahoma
- Yutan High School, Yutan, Nebraska

=== Chippewas/Chippewa Raiders ===
- Chippewa Secondary School, North Bay, Ontario

=== Choctaws ===
- Bibb County High School, Centreville, Alabama
- Dyer County High School, Newbern, Tennessee
- West Tallahatchie High School, Webb, Mississippi

=== Comanche(s) ===
- Cahokia High School, Cahokia Heights, Illinois
- Canyon High School, Anaheim Hills, Anaheim, California
- Shiner High School, Shiner, Texas
- West Texas High School, Stinnett, Texas

=== Dine' Warriors ===
- Tse Yi Gai High School, Cuba, New Mexico – town is 26% Native American

=== Eskimos or Eskymos ===
- Bowbells High School, Bowbells, North Dakota
- Escanaba Area Public Schools, Escanaba, Michigan – The public schools are all the Eskymos, and have an Indian education program.
- Town of Webb High School, Old Forge, New York

=== Halfbreeds ===
- Aniak Jr/Sr High School, Aniak, Alaska

=== Hurons ===
- Rogers City High School, Rogers City, Michigan

=== Indian(s) ===
==== A-E ====
- Adair County High School, Columbia, Kentucky
- Altamont High School, Altamont, Illinois
- Alvarado High School, Alvarado, Texas
- Anacoco High School, Anacoco, Louisiana
- Anacostia High School, Washington, D.C.
- Andale High School, Andale, Kansas
- Anderson High School, Anderson, Indiana – The mascot will be retained, but the pre-game "Indian Maiden" dance and costumed mascot performance, which had been suspended following negative response to a viral video, will be eliminated.
- Arapaho High School, Arapaho, Oklahoma
- Arickaree High School, Anton, Colorado
- Armuchee High School, Rome, Georgia
- Asher High School, Asher, Oklahoma
- Athens Jr/Sr High School, Athens, Michigan
- Avinger High School, Avinger, Texas
- Baldwin Middle-Senior High School, Baldwin, Florida
- Bartlett High School, Webster, Massachusetts – Student journalism uses "Totem Pole Television" as the name of its YouTube channel, and "Trading Post" for a collection of new and used clothing that is free to students.
- Berkeley Springs High School, Berkeley Springs, West Virginia
- Berlin High School, Berlin, Wisconsin – In 2015, 92% of the community and 90% of the students voted to keep the name.
- Billerica Memorial High School, Billerica, Massachusetts
- Biloxi High School, Biloxi, Mississippi
- Bismarck High School, Bismarck, Missouri
- Bridgeport High School, Bridgeport, West Virginia
- Brimfield High School, Brimfield, Illinois
- Broken Bow High School, Broken Bow, Nebraska
- Browning High School, Browning, Montana – Blackfeet Indian Reservation
- Buhl High School, Buhl, Idaho
- Burroughs High School, Burbank, California
- Byhalia High School, Byhalia, Mississippi
- Caddo Hills High School, Norman, Arkansas
- Calumet High School, Chicago, Illinois
- Campbell High School, Campbell, Texas
- Canal Winchester High School, Canal Winchester, Ohio
- Canaseraga High School, Canaseraga, New York
- Candor High School, Candor, New York
- Carlisle High School, Price, Texas
- Carlisle High School, Carlisle, Ohio
- Carlyle High School, Carlyle, Illinois
- Catoosa High School, Catoosa, Oklahoma
- Cedarville High School, Cedarville, Ohio
- Central High School, Cheyenne, Wyoming
- Central High School, St. Joseph, Missouri
- Charlton County High School, Folkston, Georgia
- Chattooga High School, Summerville, Georgia
- Cherokee High School (Alabama), Cherokee, Alabama
- Cherokee High School, Rogersville, Tennessee
- Chesaning High School, Chesaning, Michigan,
- Chiefland High School, Chiefland, Florida
- Chilhowee High School, Chilhowee, Missouri
- Choctawhatchee High School, Fort Walton Beach, Florida
- Clark County High School, Kahoka, Missouri
- Clarke High School, Osceola, Iowa – A proposed poster depicting the girls' basketball team in headdresses and warpaint received national attention for cultural insensitivity when it was posted on social media.
- Clarksville High School, Clarksville, Iowa
- Cleveland High School, Cleveland, Texas
- Clifton-Fine High School, Star Lake, New York
- Cobre High School, Bayard, New Mexico
- Colbert County High School, Leighton, Alabama
- Comanche High School, Comanche, Texas
- Comanche High School, Comanche, Oklahoma
- Conemaugh Township High School, Davidsville, Pennsylvania
- Conneaut Lake High School, Conneaut Lake, Pennsylvania
- Conneaut Valley High School, Conneautville, Pennsylvania
- Copley High School, Copley, Ohio
- Cord-Charlotte High School, Charlotte, Arkansas
- Couch High School, Myrtle, Missouri
- Council Rock North High School, Newtown, Pennsylvania
- County Line High School, Branch, Arkansas
- Cowanesque Valley High School, Westfield, Pennsylvania
- Dakota High School, Dakota, Illinois

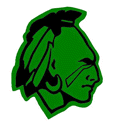
Dartmouth High School Indian

- Dartmouth High School, Dartmouth, Massachusetts
- Delaplaine High School, Delaplaine, Arkansas
- Dobyns-Bennett High School, Kingsport, Tennessee
- Dodge County High School, Eastman, Georgia – Girl's teams are "Squaws"
- Donegal High School, Mt. Joy, Pennsylvania
- Douglass High School, Douglass, Texas
- DuQuoin High School, DuQuoin, Illinois
- East Bay High School, Gibsonton, Florida – While six lower schools in the Hillsborough County, Florida School District will get new mascots, the Chamberlain and East Bay high schools will keep their mascots but change their traditions to be more authentic and less insensitive.
- East Coweta High School, Sharpsburg, Georgia
- East Limestone High School, Athens, Alabama
- East Robertson High School, Cross Plains, Tennessee
- El Reno High School, El Reno, Oklahoma – There was discussion about the name when a Native American student was not allowed to wear a beaded mortarboard at graduation. The result was the signing of a Spirit Charter with the Cheyenne & Arapaho Tribes to retain the name while agreeing to avoid any derogatory or disrespectful Native American references.
- Elko High School, Elko, Nevada - A resolution by the Te-Moak Tribe of Western Shoshone Indians of Nevada allows the school to retain its mascot.
- Elsberry High School, Elsberry, Missouri
- Elton High School, Elton, Louisiana

==== F-L ====
- Fair Park High School, Shreveport, Louisiana
- Fairfield High School, Fairfield, Ohio - A Native American student who created an online survey to collect suggestions for a new mascot received death threats and racial slurs.
- Flandreau Indian High School, Flandreau, South Dakota
- Forest City High School, Forest City, Iowa
- Fort Davis High School, Fort Davis, Texas
- Fort Defiance High School, Fort Defiance, Virginia
- Fort Osage High School, Independence, Missouri
- Fort Recovery High School, Fort Recovery, Ohio
- Fort White High School, Fort White, Florida
- Four Winds High School (Spirit Lake Reservation), Fort Totten, North Dakota
- Fourche Valley High School, Briggsville, Arkansas
- Franklin High School, Reisterstown, Maryland
- Frankston High School, Frankston, Texas
- Fullerton Union High School, Fullerton, California
- Gaffney High School, Gaffney, South Carolina
- Ganado High School, Ganado, Texas
- Giddings State School, Giddings, Texas – Juvenile Corrections School
- Gilbert High School, Gilbert, South Carolina
- Girard High School, Girard, Ohio
- Grafton High School, Grafton, Massachusetts
- Grand Ridge High School, Grand Ridge, Florida
- Grand Saline High School, Grand Saline, Texas
- Greenville Junior-Senior High School, Greenville, California
- Greenwood High School, Greenwood, Wisconsin
- Griffiths Middle School, Downey, California
- Groton High School, Groton, New York
- Groveton High School, Groveton, Texas
- Hallsville High School, Hallsville, Missouri
- Hancock County High School, Sneedville, Tennessee
- Happy Camp High School, Happy Camp, California
- Harlandale High School, San Antonio, Texas – Logo and school colors are the same as the Washington Redskins
- Harpeth High School, Kingston Springs, Tennessee
- Haskell High School, Haskell, Texas
- Hays High School, Hays, Kansas
- Hayti High School, Hayti, Missouri
- Hazlehurst High School, Hazlehurst, Mississippi
- Hillsboro High School, Hillsboro, Ohio
- Holt High School, Wentzville, Missouri
- Holy Cross High School, Covington, Kentucky
- Hononegah Community High School, Rockton, Illinois - A non-native cheerleader's performance as "Princess Hononegah" has led to competing online petitions by students regarding the elimination or retention of the school mascot; and a state legislator's proposal to amend the Illinois Interscholastic Athletic Organization Act to require the consent of a local tribe for any Native American mascot.
- Hoosic Valley High School, Schaghticoke, New York
- Hoxie High School, Hoxie, Kansas
- Huckabay High School, Huckabay, Texas
- Immokalee High School, Immokalee, Florida
- Indian Lake Central High School, Indian Lake, New York
- Indian River High School, Dagsboro, Delaware
- Indiana Area Senior High School, Indiana, Pennsylvania
- Indianola High School, Indianola, Iowa
- Irwin County High School, Ocilla, Georgia
- Istrouma High School, Baton Rouge, Louisiana
- Itawamba Agricultural High School, Fulton, Mississippi
- Jackson High School, Jackson, Missouri
- Jacksonville High School, Jacksonville, Texas
- Jim Ned High School, Tuscola, Texas
- Johnston City High School, Johnston City, Illinois
- Jourdanton High School, Jourdanton, Texas – Girls team are "Squaws"
- Juniata High School, Mifflintown, Pennsylvania
- Karnack High School, Karnack, Texas
- Keller High School, Keller, Texas - The Society of Native Nations wants the school board to drop the name.
- Kennett High School, Kennett, Missouri
- Ketcham High School, Wappingers Falls, New York
- Kewaskum High School, Kewaskum, Wisconsin
- Keya Paha County High School, Springview, Nebraska
- Keystone Heights Junior/Senior High School, Keystone Heights, Florida
- Kiowa High School, Kiowa, Colorado - The state commission on mascots allowed the school to retain their name with support of the Kiowa tribe.
- Lake Central High School, St. John, Indiana
- Larned High School, Larned, Kansas
- Lawrenceville High School, Lawrenceville, Illinois
- Lehighton Area High School, Lehighton, Pennsylvania
- Lenape High School, Medford, New Jersey
- Lewistown High School, Lewistown, Illinois
- Liberty High School, Liberty, New York
- Lipan High School, Lipan, Texas
- Little Axe High School, Norman, Oklahoma
- Loachapoka High School, Loachapoka, Alabama
- Lodge Grass High School, Lodge Grass, Montana
- Lumpkin County High School, Dahlonega, Georgia
- Lutie High School, Theodosia, Missouri

==== M-R ====
- Madison Central High School, Richmond, Kentucky
- Mahnomen High School, Mahnomen County, Minnesota
- Manhattan High School, Manhattan, Kansas – The mascot was discussed at a school board forum where student and community members spoke on both sides of the issue. The Unitarian Universalist Fellowship of Manhattan passed a resolution in favor of changing the mascot. The school board has set a September 6, 2017 deadline for a decision on the recommendations of the mascot advisory committee which included having the students vote on a name change. The decision was to retain the name but add Native American studies to the curriculum, and create a Native American student scholarship and/or a teacher grant.
- Marengo Community High School, Marengo, Illinois
- Maricopa High School, Maricopa, California
- Marietta High School, Marietta, Oklahoma
- Marked Tree High School, Marked Tree, Arkansas
- Marysville High School, Marysville, California
- Mascoutah Community High School, Mascoutah, Illinois
- McEachern High School, Powder Springs, Georgia
- Mechanicsburg High School, Mechanicsburg, Ohio
- Medicine Lodge High School, Medicine Lodge, Kansas
- Meredosia-Chambersburg High School, Meredosia, Illinois
- Milan High School, Milan, Indiana
- Millersburg Area High School, Millersburg, Pennsylvania
- Minatare High School, Minatare, Nebraska
- Minooka High School, Minooka, Illinois - Online petitions have been created to gather support for both changing and retaining the mascot.
- Mishicot High School, Mishicot, Wisconsin
- Mississinewa High School, Gas City, Indiana
- Mohawk High School, Marcola, Oregon
- Momence High School, Momence, Illinois
- Montgomery Central High School, Cunningham, Montgomery County, Tennessee
- Montgomery County High School, Mt. Sterling, Kentucky
- Morton High School, Morton, Texas
- Mosinee High School, Mosinee, Wisconsin
- Mountain Valley High School, Saguache, Colorado
- Mount Gilead High School, Mount Gilead, Ohio
- Mukwonago High School, Mukwonago, Wisconsin
- Muncy Junior-Senior High School, Muncy, Pennsylvania
- Murray County High School, Chatsworth, Georgia
- Navajo High School, Altus, Oklahoma
- Negreet High School, Negreet, Louisiana
- Neoga High School, Neoga, Illinois
- New Hope High School, New Hope, Alabama
- Newberry High School, Newberry, Michigan
- Newton Local High School, Pleasant Hill, Ohio - Superintendent states: “In this country, the PC culture is continuing to fuel conflict where none should exist and in places where common sense prevails”
- Nocona High School, Nocona, Texas
- North East High School, North East, Maryland
- North Hills High School, Ross Township, Allegheny County, Pennsylvania (a suburb of Pittsburgh, Pennsylvania)
- North Side High School, Jackson, Tennessee
- North Brookfield High School, North Brookfield, Massachusetts
- Northside High School, Vernon, Texas
- Northumberland High School, Heathsville, Virginia
- Northwest High School, Canal Fulton, Ohio
- Norwood High School, Norwood, Ohio
- Ogallala High School, Ogallala, Nebraska
- Ohatchee High School, Ohatchee, Alabama
- Oklahoma School for the Deaf, Sulphur, Oklahoma
- Oneida High School, Oneida, Tennessee
- Orangeburg Preparatory Schools, Orangeburg, South Carolina
- Osage High School, Kaiser, Missouri
- Osage City High School, Osage City, Kansas
- Osceola High School, Osceola, Missouri
- Oskaloosa High School, Oskaloosa, Iowa
- Oswego High School, Oswego, Kansas
- Pacific High School, Pacific, Missouri
- Paint Rock High School, Paint Rock, Texas
- Palm Springs High School, Palm Springs, California
- Passaic High School, Passaic, New Jersey
- Pawnee High School, Pawnee, Illinois
- Pawnee City High School, Pawnee City, Nebraska
- Payson-Seymour High School, Payson, Illinois
- Pecatonica High School, Pecatonica, Illinois
- Peebles High School, Peebles, Ohio
- Penn Hills High School, Pittsburgh, Pennsylvania
- Pennsauken High School, Pennsauken Township, New Jersey
- Peters Township High School, McMurray, Pennsylvania
- Pinson Valley High School, Pinson, Alabama
- Piqua High School, Piqua, Ohio
- Plainview High School, Ardmore, Oklahoma
- Pocahontas Area Middle School/High School, Pocahontas, Iowa
- Pocola High School, Pocola, Oklahoma
- Ponca High School, Ponca, Nebraska
- Pontiac Township High School, Pontiac, Illinois
- Poplar High School, Poplar, Montana
- Port Neches-Groves High School, Port Neches, Texas - The Alabama-Coushatta Tribe of Texas is calling for an end to using the Indian mascot. The school district had cited a 1979 document in which a former chief of the Cherokee Nation had given permission for the mascot, but this was revoked in 2020.
- Portage High School, Portage, Indiana
- Powell Valley High School, Speedwell, Tennessee
- Powhatan High School, Powhatan, Virginia
- Poyen High School, Poyen, Arkansas
- Prairie Lea High School, Prairie Lea, Texas
- Preston High School, Preston, Idaho
- Puxico High School, Puxico, Missouri
- Quanah High School, Quanah, Texas
- Rahway High School, Rahway, New Jersey
- Ravena-Coeymans-Selkirk High School, Ravena, New York
- Reardan High School, Reardan, Washington
- Riesel High School, Riesel, Texas
- Ripon High School, Ripon, California
- Rittman High School, Rittman, Ohio
- Roseburg High School, Roseburg, Oregon - The school board voted in April 2021 to retain the mascot by one dissenting vote, which needed to be unanimous. The vote came in response to a local petition after a year in which many schools changed their mascots following the decision by the Washington Commanders. However Oregon State law allows schools to retain their Native American mascots with the consent of a local tribe, which Roseburg has with the Cow Creek Band of Umpqua Indians.
- Roxborough High School, Philadelphia, Pennsylvania
- Rural Retreat High School, Rural Retreat, Virginia
- Russellville High School, Russellville, Missouri

==== S-Z ====
- Sac City High School, Sac City, Iowa
- Sacred Heart Catholic School, Hallettsville, Texas
- Sanborn Regional High School, Kingston, New Hampshire - Students are showing support for an online petition to change the name, and using a Facebook page to collect suggestions for a replacement.
- Sandwich Community High School, Sandwich, Illinois
- Sanger High School, Sanger, Texas
- Santa Fe High School, Santa Fe, Texas
- Satanta High School, Satanta, Kansas
- Sauquoit Valley High School, Sauquoit, New York
- Scappoose High School, Scappoose, Oregon
- Seminole High School, Seminole, Texas – Indians and Maidens
- Seminole County High School, Donalsonville, Georgia
- Seneca High School, Seneca, Missouri
- Sequatchie County High School, Dunlap, Tennessee
- Sequoyah High School, Tahlequah, Oklahoma
- Shamokin Area High School, Coal Township, Pennsylvania
- Shattuck High School, Shattuck, Oklahoma
- Shawnee High School, Lima, Ohio
- Shoshone High School, Shoshone, Idaho
- Sissonville High School, Sissonville, West Virginia
- Souderton Area High School, Souderton, Pennsylvania
- Southampton High School, Courtland, Virginia
- Southern Local Jr./Sr. High School, Salineville, Ohio
- Southern Choctaw High School, Gilbertown, Alabama
- Southern Fulton High School, Warfordsburg, Pennsylvania
- Spirit Lake High School, Spirit Lake, Iowa
- St. Francis High School, St. Francis, Kansas
- St. Paul High School, St. Paul, Kansas
- St. Stephens High School, Hickory, North Carolina
- St. Vincent High School, Perryville, Missouri
- Stafford Senior High School, Falmouth, Virginia
- Stamford Central High School, Stamford, New York
- Stebbins High School, Riverside, Ohio
- Stephens County High School, Toccoa, Georgia
- Stilwell High School, Stilwell, Oklahoma
- Stockbridge Valley High School, Munnsville, New York
- Strafford High School, Strafford, Missouri
- Strasburg High School, Strasburg, Colorado - School has established an agreement with the Northern Arapahoe Tribe.
- Susquehanna Township High School, Harrisburg, Pennsylvania - In 2021, although the community was divided, after meetings that included local Indigenous people the decision was made to change the mascot, the final impetus coming from students. In 2022 the Susquehanna Township School District voted to reverse their decision by a 5-4 vote.
- Tallulah Falls School, Tallulah Falls, Georgia – Private boarding school
- Tarkio High School, Tarkio, Missouri
- Tecumseh High School, Tecumseh, Michigan
- Tekonsha High School, Tekonsha, Michigan
- Tioga High School, Tioga, Louisiana
- Tishomingo High School, Tishomingo, Oklahoma
- Toms River High School South, Toms River, New Jersey - Some say school's ‘Indian’ mascot is demeaning and needs to go. For others, it's a proud tradition.
- Towns County High School, Hiawassee, Georgia
- Twin Lakes High School, Monticello, Indiana
- Union City High School, Union City, Indiana
- Upper Perkiomen High School, Pennsburg, Pennsylvania
- Valley High School, Lucasville, Ohio
- Van-Far High School, Vandalia, Missouri
- Venice High School, Venice, Florida - The school was asked to cover its logo, a man in a Native American headdress, for a performance by the marching band at Disney World on November 12, 2022, but have decided not to do so. Student members of the band will attend without performing.
- Vero Beach High School, Vero Beach, Florida
- Vici High School, Vici, Oklahoma
- Vidalia Comprehensive High School, Vidalia, Georgia
- Waite High School, Toledo, Ohio
- Wapanucka High School, Wapanucka, Oklahoma
- Wapello Jr/Sr High School, Wapello, Iowa
- Ware High School, Ware, Massachusetts
- Washington-Marion High School, Lake Charles, Louisiana
- Waukon High School, Waukon, Iowa
- Wauseon High School, Wauseon, Ohio
- Waxahachie High School, Waxahachie, Texas
- Wayne City High School, Wayne City, Illinois
- Wayne Valley High School, Wayne, New Jersey - A survey of local opinion resulted in 57% wanting to keep the mascot, only 25% favoring change.
- Waynesboro Area Senior High School, Waynesboro, Pennsylvania
- Weehawken High School, Weehawken, New Jersey
- Weeping Water High School, Weeping Water, Nebraska
- Weequahic High School, Newark, New Jersey
- West Allegheny High School, Imperial, Pennsylvania
- West Canada Valley High School, Newport, New York
- West Forest Junior Senior High School, Tionesta, Pennsylvania
- Western High School, Latham, Ohio
- Westminster Catawba Christian School, Rock Hill, South Carolina – Private Christian preK–12 school.
- Wetumpka High School, Wetumpka, Alabama
- White Cloud High School, White Cloud, Michigan
- Wichita County High School, Leoti, Kansas
- Wicomico High School, Salisbury, Maryland
- Williford High School, Williford, Arkansas
- Winnebago High School, Winnebago, Illinois
- Winnebago High School, Winnebago, Nebraska
- Yazoo City High School, Yazoo City, Mississippi
- Ysleta High School, El Paso, Texas

=== Kahoks ===
- Collinsville High School, Collinsville, Illinois

=== Little Green ===
- Manchester High School Central, Manchester, New Hampshire

=== Maidens ===
- Waynesboro Area Senior High School, Waynesboro, Pennsylvania Boys' teams are "Indians"

=== Marauders ===
- Monache High School, Porterville, California – There was a large mural of a Native American on the side of the school's gym, created by Adam Sanchez, class of 2002. This referred to the high school's mascot, the "Marauder".

=== Mohawk(s) ===
- Bethune-Bowman Middle/High School, Rowesville, South Carolina
- Colebrook Academy, Colebrook, New Hampshire
- James Madison Middle School, Titusville, Florida
- Madison High School, Middletown, Ohio
- McAuley High School, Cincinnati, Ohio
- Marquette High School, Bellevue, Iowa
- Medicine Hat High School, Medicine Hat, Alberta – In 2015 a grade-12 student started a petition to change the name.
- Millis High School, Millis, Massachusetts
- Moravia High School, Moravia, Iowa
- Morley-Stanwood High School, Morley, Michigan
- Morrisonville Jr./Sr. High School, Morrisonville, Illinois
- Northwest High School, McDermott, Ohio
- Piggott High School, Piggott, Arkansas
- Waldron Junior-Senior High School, Waldron, Indiana

=== Mohigans ===
- Morgantown High School, Morgantown, West Virginia

=== Red Devils ===
- Springville High School (Utah) — a local community group, with the support of the Navajo Nation, attempted unsuccessfully in 2002 to advocate for a change in the school mascot name on the basis of the dual racist and religious connotations.

=== Red Raiders/Raiders ===
- Argonia High School, Argonia, Kansas
- Cameron County High School, Emporium, Pennsylvania
- Cliffside Park High School, Cliffside Park, New Jersey
- Coatesville Area High School, Coatesville, Pennsylvania
- Colonie Central High School, Albany, New York
- Decatur High School, Decatur, Alabama
- Derby High School, Derby, Connecticut
- Dwight Morrow High School, Englewood, New Jersey
- East Side High School, Newark, New Jersey
- Ecorse Community High School, Ecorse, Michigan
- High School of Commerce, Springfield, Massachusetts
- James I. O'Neill High School, Highland Falls, NY
- Kahuku High & Intermediate School, Kahuku, Hawaii
- Keyport High School, Keyport, New Jersey
- Lakota High School, Kansas, Ohio
- London High School, London, Ohio
- Loup City Jr/Sr High School, Loup City, Nebraska
- Lowell High School, Lowell, Massachusetts
- Marion County High School, Guin, Alabama
- Montgomery Area High School, Montgomery, Pennsylvania
- Ocean City High School, Ocean City, New Jersey
- Our Lady of Lourdes Regional School, Coal Township, Northumberland County, Pennsylvania
- Port Jervis High School, Port Jervis, New York
- Port Richmond High School, Port Richmond, Staten Island, New York
- Reeves High School, Reeves, Louisiana
- Ridley High School, Folsom, Pennsylvania – The "Green Raiders" use a Rocking R as their primary logo and a Native American Head as an alternate logo.
- St. Oscar Romero Catholic Secondary School, York, Toronto, Ontario, Canada
- South Point High School, Belmont, North Carolina
- Spaulding High School, Rochester, New Hampshire
- Thomas Jefferson High School, Auburn, Washington
- Twin Valley High School, Elverson, Pennsylvania - Although a petition to change the name started by students has received 5,500+ signatures, the school board and administration have been largely silent, citing the pandemic as their focus in 2020—21.
- Uniontown Area High School, Uniontown, Pennsylvania
- Wamego High School, Wamego, Kansas
- Warren East High School, Bowling Green, Kentucky
- Warren G. Harding High School, Warren, Ohio
- Winnsboro High School, Winnsboro, Texas

=== Redmen ===
- Arnprior District High School, Arnprior, Ontario
- Bellevue High School, Bellevue, Ohio
- Bucyrus High School, Bucyrus, Ohio
- Denis Morris Catholic High School, St. Catharines, Ontario
- East Islip High School, Islip Terrace, New York
- Fostoria High School, Fostoria, Ohio
- Parma Senior High School, Parma, Ohio
- Rock Hill Senior High School, Ironton, Ohio
- Sisseton High School, Sisseton, South Dakota – Located on the Lake Traverse Indian Reservation
- Smith Center High School, Smith Center, Kansas
- Tewksbury Memorial High School, Tewksbury, Massachusetts

=== Reds ===
- Calaveras High School, San Andreas, California - When a state law required dropping the Redskins, no new name was selected in 2016 and their Native logo was retained. They are now "The Mighty Reds"
- Eaton High School, Eaton, Colorado

=== Redskins ===
- Algood Middle School, Algood, Tennessee
- Arcadia High School, Arcadia, Ohio
- Bryan County High School, Pembroke, Georgia
- Caldwell High School, Caldwell, Ohio
- Coshocton High School, Coshocton, Ohio
- Donna High School, Donna, Texas
- Fort Loramie High School, Fort Loramie, Ohio - At a school board meeting in July 2020 only one resident spoke in favor of changing the name, while 14 favored keeping it.
- Hurricane High School, Hurricane, West Virginia
- Indian Creek High School, Wintersville, Ohio
- Kingston High School, Kingston, Oklahoma - The town population is about 15% Native American
- Knox Community High School, Knox, Indiana
- Liberal High School, Liberal, Kansas
- Little River High School, Little River, Kansas
- Loudon High School, Loudon, Tennessee
- Manteo High School, Manteo, North Carolina
- McLoud High School, McLoud, Oklahoma
- Momence High School, Momence, Illinois
- Neshaminy High School, Langhorne, Pennsylvania
- Nokomis High School, Nokomis, Illinois
- Oneonta High School, Oneonta, Alabama
- Pocahontas High School, Pocahontas, Arkansas
- Port Clinton High School, Port Clinton, Ohio
- Red Mesa High School, Teec Nos Pos, Arizona (Majority of students Native American)
- Ringgold High School, Ringgold, Louisiana
- Rush Springs High School, Rush Springs, Oklahoma
- St. Henry High School, St. Henry, Ohio
- St. Johns High School, St. Johns, Arizona
- Sayre High School, Sayre, Pennsylvania
- Shawnee High School, Wolf Lake, Illinois
- Social Circle High School, Social Circle, Georgia - Having received comments both pro and con on changing the mascot, the superintendent stated that there will be no change in 2020 due to the cost.
- Sullivan High School, Sullivan, Illinois
- Utica High School, Utica, Ohio
- Wapakoneta High School, Wapakoneta, Ohio
- Wellpinit High School, Wellpinit, Washington - The majority of students are members of the Spokane Tribe, and voted to retain the name in 2014 and again in 2023.

=== Renegades ===
The term "renegade" was historically used to describe Native Americans who refused to live on reservations and continued to follow traditional lifestyles.

- Shawnee High School, Burlington County, New Jersey

=== Sachems ===
- Middleborough High School, Middleborough, Massachusetts
- Saugus High School, Saugus, Massachusetts
- Laconia High School, Laconia, New Hampshire

=== Sauras ===
- South Stokes High School, Walnut Cove, North Carolina

=== Savages ===
- Broken Bow High School, Broken Bow, Oklahoma
- Leflore High School, Leflore, Oklahoma
- Quinton High School, Quinton, Oklahoma
- Salmon High School, Salmon, Idaho
- Salmon River High School, Salmon River, Idaho
- Savannah High School, Savannah, Missouri - The school board voted in 2021 to phase out imagery, but retain the name.
- Sigourney Junior/Senior High School, Sigourney, Iowa
- Tecumseh High School, Tecumseh, Oklahoma
- Wynnewood High School, Wynnewood, Oklahoma

=== Scouts ===
- Lake Forest High School, Lake Forest, Illinois – Some logos use Native American images or spear

=== Seminoles ===
- Creekside High School, Fairburn, Georgia
- Monroe Central High School, Woodsfield, Ohio
- Osceola High School, Osceola, Arkansas
- Salem High School, Conyers, Georgia
- Southeast High School, Bradenton, Florida
- Westside High School, Macon, Georgia
- Toms River Intermediate School South, Beachwood, New Jersey
- Seminole High School, Sanford, Florida

=== Senecas ===
- Calvert High School, Tiffin, Ohio

=== Sioux ===
- Lower Brule High School, Lower Brule, South Dakota – Located on the Lower Brule Indian Reservation
- Solen High School, Solen, North Dakota – Located on the Standing Rock Indian Reservation
- Westhope High School, Westhope, North Dakota

=== Sobos ===
- South Beloit High School, South Beloit, Illinois

=== Squaws ===
Squaw is a sexualized racial slur against Native women.

- Bellmont High School, Decatur, Indiana – Boys' teams are "Braves"
- Dodge County High School, Eastman, Georgia – Boys' teams are "Indians"
- Jourdanton High School, Jourdanton, Texas – Boys' teams are "Indians"

=== Thunderbirds ===
Although the thunderbird is a creature in Native American mythology, these school's logos/mascots may come from indirect associations with the United States Air Force Thunderbirds or the Ford Thunderbird.

- Bellevue West High School, Bellevue, Nebraska - Offutt Air Force Base is located in Bellevue
- Circle High School, Towanda, Kansas
- Edsel Ford High School, Dearborn, Michigan - Dearborn is the location of the Ford Motor Company headquarters.
- GFW High School, Winthrop, Minnesota
- Johnson County Central High School, Tecumseh, Nebraska
- Legacy High School, Vancouver, Washington
- Mount Tahoma High School, Tacoma, Washington
- North Callaway High School, Kingdom City, Missouri
- Park Crossing High School, Montgomery, Alabama
- Sangre De Cristo Undivided High School, Mosca, Colorado
- Thornwood High School, South Holland, Illinois
- Timpview High School, Provo, Utah
- Tumwater High School, Tumwater, Washington
- Yucaipa High School, Yucaipa, California

=== Tomahawk(s) ===
- Marysville Pilchuck High School, Marysville, Washington - With the passage of a new state law, the Tulalip Tribes leadership requested the change in June 2021. In December 2021 the Tulalip granted permission to keep the name. However, Marysville's Totem Lake Middle School will no longer be the Tomahawks.
- Merrimack High School, Merrimack, New Hampshire

=== Tribe ===
- Chowchilla Union High School, Chowchilla, California

=== Wamps ===
- Braintree High School, Braintree, Massachusetts – Nickname derived from the Wampanoag people

=== Warrior(s) ===
A number of schools with the name "Warriors" never used Indigenous imagery, or changed in response to the controversy.

- Adair High School, Adair Independent School District, Adair, Oklahoma - Former logo was the head of a Native American wearing a Plains feather headdress. Current logo is two eagle feathers attached to the letter 'A'. The school sits within Cherokee Nation boundaries.
- Adena High School, Frankfort, Ohio
- Ahwahnee Middle School, Fresno, California - Logo is a spear with feathers
- Alabama School for the Deaf, Talladega, Alabama - The "Silent Warriors" use an Indian head logo.
- Aloha High School, Aloha, Oregon
- Alta Loma Junior High School, Alta Loma, California - Logo includes feathers
- Amity High School, Amity, Oregon
- Anadarko High School, Anadarko, Oklahoma – The city population is 41% Native American, and the entire school district are the Warriors.
- Arapahoe High School, Centennial, Colorado
- Blue Hills Regional Technical School, Canton, Massachusetts
- Bristol High School, Bristol, Pennsylvania
- Brookfield High School, Brookfield, Ohio
- Brother Rice High School Bloomfield Township, Oakland County, Michigan
- Buckeye Trail High School, Lore City, Ohio
- Cambridge Rindge and Latin School, Cambridge, Massachusetts
- Canton High School, Canton, Connecticut
- Carpinteria High School, Carpinteria, California
- Carrollton High School, Carrollton, Ohio
- Casey-Westfield High School, Casey, Illinois
- Cherokee High School, Canton, Georgia
- Chippewa Hills High School, Remus, Michigan
- Choctaw Central High School, Philadelphia, Mississippi
- Clinton High School, Clinton, New York
- Cotter High School, Cotter, Arkansas
- Crete-Monee High School, Crete, Illinois
- Danville Community High School, Danville, Indiana
- Delaware Valley High School, Milford, Pennsylvania
- Dodge County Middle School, Eastman, Georgia
- East Middle School, Erie, Pennsylvania - Proposal by the school board president to eliminate Native American logo but retain Warriors name receives little support.
- East Dubuque High School, East Dubuque, Illinois
- East Poinsett County High School, East Poinsett County, Arkansas
- East Ridge High School, Pike County, Kentucky
- Eastern High School, Sardinia, Ohio
- Edgewood Senior High School, Ashtabula, Ohio
- Elizabeth Forward High School, Elizabeth, Pennsylvania – Entire school district, including Elizabeth Forward Middle School and four elementary schools, are all the "Warriors" and use an "Indian Head" logo.
- Eminence High School, Eminence, Kentucky
- Fairview Middle School, Gonzales, California
- Fallbrook High School, Fallbrook, California
- Galt High School, Galt, California
- Gettysburg Area High School, Adams County, Pennsylvania
- Gordon Central High School, Calhoun, Georgia
- Goshen High School, Goshen, Ohio
- Granite City High School, Granite City, Illinois
- Grass Lake High School, Grass Lake, Michigan
- Harrison High School, Evansville, Indiana
- Heart Butte Warriors, Blackfeet Reservation
- Henderson High School, West Chester, Pennsylvania
- Hickman Middle School, Hickman, California
- Hunters Lane High School, Nashville, Tennessee
- Idabel High School, Idabel, Oklahoma
- Jupiter Community High School, Jupiter, Florida
- Kecoughtan High School, Hampton, Virginia
- King Philip Regional High School, Wrentham, Massachusetts
- La Puente High School, La Puente, California
- Lakeview–Fort Oglethorpe High School, Fort Oglethorpe, Georgia
- Lakeview Middle School, Rossville, Georgia
- Lamar High School, Lamar, Arkansas
- Laytonville High School, Laytonville, California
- Lebanon High School, Lebanon, Ohio
- Liverpool High School, Liverpool, New York - The school board voted in 2023 to retain the Warriors name but remove Native American references, with no certaintly as to whether this will satisfy state requirements.
- Maine West High School, Des Plaines, Illinois - Mascot is being questioned after negative social media response to a YouTube video. The performance of a student in a Native American costume, which was similar to Chief Illiniwek, has been discontinued, and a committee will be formed to discuss the imagery that will be used in the future.
- Mandaree High School, Fort Berthold Indian Reservation, Mandaree, North Dakota
- Magna Vista High School, Ridgeway, Virginia
- Manasquan High School, Manasquan, New Jersey
- Mariemont High School, Mariemont, Ohio
- McCormick Junior High School, Cheyenne, Wyoming
- Medfield High School, Medfield, Massachusetts
- Meridian High School, Meridian, Idaho - The team will keep the Warriors nickname, but continue to phase out its native headdress logo in favor of a block "M".
- Methacton High School, Fairview Village, Pennsylvania
- Mission San Jose High School, Fremont, California
- Mohawk High School, Sycamore, Ohio
- Modoc Middle School, Alturas, California
- Muskego High School, Muskego, Wisconsin
- Nipmuc Regional High School, Upton, Massachusetts
- Narragansett Regional High School, Templeton, Massachusetts
- Nokomis Regional High School, Newport, Maine - New school being built likely to retain name, but eliminate Native American imagery.
- North Cobb High School, Kennesaw, Georgia
- Northwestern High School, Springfield, Ohio
- Oakdale High School, Oakdale, Louisiana
- Oconee County High School, Watkinsville, Georgia
- Ontario High School, Mansfield, Ohio
- Orestimba High School, Newman, California
- Osceola Fundamental High School, Largo, Florida
- The Orme School, Mayer, Arizona
- Ouachita High School, Donaldson, Arkansas
- Pocahontas County High School, Dunmore, West Virginia
- Portage High School, Portage, Wisconsin
- Rice Lake High School, Rice Lake, Wisconsin
- Riverside High School, Belle, West Virginia
- Salamanca Central High School, Salamanca, New York - The school district is located within the Seneca Nation of Indians sovereign territory, 36% of the enrollment listed their ethnicity as Native in a 2018 survey.
- San Pasqual Valley High School, Winterhaven, California
- Seekonk High School, Seekonk, Massachusetts – Logo includes a feathered spear
- Senatobia Municipal School District, Senatobia, Mississippi
- Sherando High School, Stephens City, Virginia – A local Abenaki man has contacted the school administration voicing his objections to the name. In spite of objections by students and others; a man in Native American costume, face paint, riding a horse and carrying a spear continues to make appearances at football games.
- South Grand Prairie High School, Grand Prairie, Texas
- Standing Rock High School, Standing Rock Indian Reservation, Fort Yates, North Dakota
- St. Charles West High School, St. Charles, Missouri
- Smithville High School, Smithville, Missouri
- Southwestern High School, Somerset, Kentucky
- Sterling High School, Sterling, Illinois - The "Golden Warriors" logo is an S in a circle with two feathers.
- Susquehannock High School, Glen Rock, Pennsylvania - The image of an indigenous warrior was replaced with a "W" logo in 2021. The Southern York County School District school board, newer members constituting a conservative majority, voted 7-2 to restore the old mascot over opposition by local native communities who find it offensive and racist.
- Swett High School, Crockett, California – Citing the Golden State Warriors as an example, this Bay Area school changed from Indians to Warriors in February, 2016. However, unlike the NBA team the high school has not eliminated Native American references.
- Tantasqua Regional High School, Fiskdale, Massachusetts
- Tehachapi High School, Tehachapi, California
- Tenaya Middle School, Merced, California
- Thompson High School, Alabaster, Alabama
- Tidewater Academy, Wakefield, Virginia
- Tuloso-Midway High School, Corpus Christi, Texas
- Valley Regional High School, Deep River, Connecticut - 250 students and alumni have signed a petition to change the logo, which is similar to the one used by the Washington Redskins.
- Waccamaw High School, Pawleys Island, South Carolina
- Wahconah Regional High School, Dalton, Massachusetts
- Wahluke High School, Mattawa, Washington - The Yakama Nation has approved the school district's use of the Warrior image.
- Walsh Jesuit High School, Cuyahoga Falls, Ohio
- Walled Lake Western High School, Commerce Township, Michigan
- Wamogo Regional High School, Litchfield, Connecticut
- Wando High School, Mount Pleasant, South Carolina - A petition to change the mascot has been started by students.
- Wantagh Senior High School, Wantagh, New York
- Warren High School, Warren, Illinois
- Warren Central High School, Indianapolis, Indiana
- Warroad High School, Warroad, Minnesota
- Warwick High School, Lititz, Pennsylvania
- Warwick High School, Spirit Lake Indian Reservation, Warwick, North Dakota
- Washington High School, Sioux Falls, South Dakota
- Washington Academic Middle School, Sanger, California
- Wasilla High School, Wasilla, Alaska - With input from the local Knik Tribe the prior logo, a Lakota Sioux warrior, was replaced with an image of the Dena’ina Athabascan Chief Wasilla, the community's namesake.
- Watchung Hills Regional High School, Warren Township, New Jersey
- Watkins Memorial High School, Pataskala, Ohio
- Waunakee High School, Waunakee, Wisconsin
- Waubonsie Valley High School, Aurora, Illinois
- Wawasee High School, Syracuse, Indiana
- Wayland High School, Wayland, Massachusetts – Uses a feathered spear as its logo
- Wayne High School, Huber Heights, Ohio
- West Branch High School, Beloit, Ohio
- West Hill Collegiate Institute, Scarborough, Toronto, Ontario
- West Iredell High School, Statesville, North Carolina
- West Orange High School, Winter Garden, Florida
- West Torrance High School, Torrance, California
- Western Grove High School, Western Grove, Arkansas
- Western High School, Las Vegas, Nevada - In 2018, Native American students and parents have asked the administration to change the name and imagery as perpetuating harmful stereotypes.
- Westinghouse High School, Chicago, Illinois
- Westlake High School, Westlake Village, California
- Westside High School, Jonesboro, Arkansas
- Westside High School, Omaha, Nebraska
- Wheaton Academy, West Chicago, Illinois
- Whiteland Community High School, Whiteland, Indiana – The discussion of a possible change among school officials prompted a "Save the Warrior" page on Facebook. The name will be retained, but the school plans to phase out its Native American logo, beginning with sports jerseys.
- White County High School, Cleveland, Georgia
- White Oak Middle School, Cincinnati, Ohio - School is considering changing its logo, which depicts a Native American in a headdress.
- Wickes High School, Wickes, Arkansas
- White Shield High School, Fort Berthold Indian Reservation, Roseglen, North Dakota
- Wildwood High School, Wildwood, New Jersey
- Wilson Area High School, Easton, Pennsylvania - In July 2021 the school superintendent announced that the school district would be using a 'W' logo on future purchases of uniforms and merchandise. In August this decision was reversed after pushback from the community, the Native American logo being retained.
- Wilson Junior High School, El Centro, California
- Wilton-Lyndeborough Cooperative Middle/Senior High School, Wilton, New Hampshire
- Windsor High School, Windsor, Connecticut
- Woodbridge High School, Irvine, California
- Wyoming Area Secondary Center, Exeter, Pennsylvania
- Ygnacio Valley High School, Concord, California
- Yuba Gardens Intermediate, Olivehurst, California

== Prior usage ==
=== School closures ===
There have been at least 21 changes due to school closures or consolidations.

School	City	State / Province	Old Name	Year	Notes
Albany High School	Albany	Georgia	Indians/Squaws	2017	
Alto Pass High School	Alto Pass	Illinois	Apaches	1969	Consolidated into Cobden High School, nicknamed Appleknockers.
Austine School for the Deaf	Brattleboro	Vermont	Arrows	2014	
Berea High School	Berea	Ohio	Braves	2013	Merged with Midpark High School to reopen as Berea–Midpark High School, nicknamed Titans.
Cambridge Matignon School	Cambridge	Massachusetts	Warriors	2023	
Carrollton High School	Carrollton	Alabama	Indians	2006	
Coushatta High School	Coushatta	Louisiana	Choctaws	2002	
Cumberland High School	Cumberland	Kentucky	Redskins	2008	Consolidated with Evarts and Cawood High Schools to become Harlan County High School, nicknamed Black Bears and Lady Bears.
Elmer L. Meyers Junior/Senior High School	Wilkes-Barre	Pennsylvania	Mohawks	2021	Consolidated with Coughlin and G.A.R. Memorial High Schools to become Wilkes-Barre Area High School, nicknamed Wolfpack.
Gridley High School	Gridley	Illinois	Redskins	2004	Merged with El Paso High School to become El Paso–Gridley High School, nicknamed Titans.
Kelly High School	Wise	Virginia	Indian	2011	Merged with Pound High School to become Central High School, nicknamed Warriors.
Ledgemont High School	Thompson Township	Ohio	Redskins	2015	
Logan High School	Logan	South Dakota	Arrows		
Luther High School South	Chicago	Illinois	Braves	2014	
Manual High School	Indianapolis	Indiana	Redskins	2021	Merged into the Christel House Indianapolis charter network, became Christel House Watanabe High School, nicknamed Eagles.
Pocahontas High School	Pocahontas	Virginia	Indians	2008	
Pontiac Central High School	Pontiac	Michigan	Chiefs	2009	Merged with Pontiac Northern High School to become Pontiac High School, nicknamed Phoenix.
St. Alphonsus High School	Dearborn	Michigan	Arrows	2002	
St. Wendelin High School	Fostoria	Ohio	Mohawks	2017	
Storden Jeffers High School	Storden	Minnesota	Chiefs	1992	Consolidated with Sanborn and Lamberton High Schools to become Red Rock Central High School, nicknamed Falcons.
Tulare High School	Tulare	South Dakota	Chieftains		Merged with Hitchcock High School to become Hitchcock-Tulare High School, nicknamed Patriots.

=== Change decisions ===
There have been at least 275 changes due to decisions to eliminate discrimination.

Note: the year column represents when the decision was made to remove the old name.

School	City	State / Province	Old Name	New Name	Year	Notes
Afton High School	Afton	New York	Indians	Crimson Knights	2001	
Alabama School for the Blind	Talladega	Alabama	Redskins	Red Wolves	2026	
Algonquin Regional High School	Northborough	Massachusetts	Tomahawks	Titans	2021	Northboro-Southboro Regional School Committee retires the mascot after a unanimous vote. One of the leading suggestion for a new mascot in a community survey, "Thunderhawks" has met with resistance from three Native tribes as not moving away from Native American associations.
Amesbury High School	Amesbury	Massachusetts	Indians	Red Hawks	2021	After discussions that began in 2016, a committee appointed to study the issue in 2021 voted to retire the mascot.
Anderson High School	Cincinnati	Ohio	Redskins	Raptors	2020	After decades of discussion, the Forrest Hills School Board voted to change the name in the wake of increased recognition of systemic racism. The new mascot, Raptors was announced in March, 2021.
Armijo High School	Fairfield	California	Indians	The Royals	2019	In 2018 the school district instructed the superintendent to appoint a committee to study the possible change of the mascot. In 2019 the committee voted 11–4 in favor of changing the "Indians" name.
Arvada High School	Arvada	Colorado	Redskins	Reds	1993	Bulldog mascot
Atchison High School	Atchison	Kansas	Redmen	Phoenix	2021	Changing the mascot was discussed at a public forum in October, 2018 with no consensus to change. In 2021 public opinion had progressed, and the Atchison Unified School District 409 Board of Education voted unanimously to drop both the "Redmen" and the "Braves", the mascot of the middle school.
Athol High School	Athol	Massachusetts	Red Raiders	Bears	2020	The Athol Royalston Regional School Committee voted unanimously to discontinue the Red Raider as the mascot for Athol High School sports teams.
Auburndale Middle & High School	Auburndale	Wisconsin	Apaches	Eagles	2019	
Averill Park High School	Averill Park	New York	Warriors	Golden Knights	2024	
Avon High School	Avon	New York	Braves	River Hawks	2024	
Balfour Collegiate	Regina	Saskatchewan	Redmen	Bears	2014	
Barnstable High School	Hyannis	Massachusetts	Red Raiders	Red Hawks	2020	After years of opposition, including by the Mashpee Wampanoag Tribe, the principal decided it was time for change. Although the decision needs to be confirmed by a school committee in August, it is not in doubt given the awareness of institutional racism.
Bedford Road Collegiate	Saskatoon	Saskatchewan	Redmen	Redhawks	2014	
Belding High School	Belding	Michigan	Redskins	Black Knights	2016	The Belding Area Schools Board of Education unanimously voted December 19, 2016 to drop the Redskins and begin the process of selecting a new name.
Bellingham High School	Bellingham	Washington	Red Raiders	Bayhawks	2021	A new name will be selected from four alternatives after a period of public online comment.
Belmont High School	Belmont	New Hampshire	Red Raiders	N/A	2022	Students proposed a change of imagery in 2014. In June 2022 the school board voted to remove the Native American logo, retaining the Raiders name, with a new theme to be selected by students.
Bethel High School	Spanaway	Washington	Braves	Bison	2021	In accordance with Washington law
Bodley High School	Fulton	New York	Red Raiders	Red Dragons	2023	
Boise High School	Boise	Idaho	Braves	Brave	2019	While the name will be used immediately, it may take years to remove all of the former mascot imagery.
Bountiful High School	Bountiful	Utah	Braves	Redhawks	2020	Calls for change of the mascot for the predominantly white school mounted after the murder of George Floyd.
Brebeuf College School	Toronto	Ontario	Redmen	Bulls	2004	
Brentwood High School	Brentwood	New York	Indians	Spartans	2024	
Caledonia-Mumford High School	Caledonia	New York	Red Raiders	Raiders	2023	Logo also changed to wolf.
Camanche High School	Camanche	Iowa	Indians	Storm	2021	Responding to letters from the Meskawki and Oneida Nations, the school board voted 5–1 in favor of changing the mascot.
Camden-Frontier High School	Camden	Michigan	Redskins	RedHawks	2023	The mascot was retired immediately in May 2023 and was phased out in favor of the RedHawks name by June 2024.
Campo High School	Campo, Colorado	Colorado	Warriors	Patriots	2022	The South Baca Patriots are a CO-OP between Campo, Vilas, and Pritchett school districts.
Canajoharie High School	Canajoharie	New York	Redskins	Cougars	2000	
Canandaigua Academy	Canandaigua	New York	Braves	Gray Wolves	2023	
Canister-Greenwood High School	Canisteo	New York	Redskins	Chargers	2023	A committee that included students, staff and alumni recommended changing the mascot after two months of study that included a survey in which 80% supported the change. Final action will not occur until 2023.
Canton High School	Canton	Connecticut	Warriors	N/A	2021	After a year of evaluation and gathering feedback from the public, a committee unanimously voted to recommend the removal of Native American imagery from logos and athletic equipment while retaining the Warriors name.
Canton High School	Canton	Michigan	Chiefs	Cobras	2023	Change passed by school board due to student initiative over alumni opposition.
Capitol Hill High School	Oklahoma City	Oklahoma	Redskins	Red Wolves	2015	Redskins retired December 2014 by a vote of the school board, students selected as their new mascot in 2015.
Cedar High School	Cedar City	Utah	Redmen	Reds	2019	"Redmen" mascot retired by a 3–2 vote of the school board. Five years after the decision, the school board voted down a proposal to revert to the old mascot.
Centennial High School	Blaine	Minnesota	Chiefs	Cougars	1995	Students at the high school, led by the high school principal and the student council, solicited suggested mascot names from the student body and from the community. A variety of names were recommended and put on a ballot. The students at the high school voted to change the name to "Cougars". The Centennial School Board approved the new name.
Central High School	Grand Junction	Colorado	Warriors	N/A	2021	In response to state law, the Native logo was dropped. The name will be retained, but represented by a shield.
Chamberlain High School	Tampa	Florida	Chiefs	Storm	2022	
Chautauqua Lake Central School	Mayville	New York	Thunderbirds	Eagles	2023	
Cheektowaga Central High School	Cheektowaga	New York	Warriors	Chargers	2023	
Cheyenne Mountain High School	Colorado Springs	Colorado	Indians	Red-Tailed Hawk	2021	In response to a statewide program, the school took action in 2016 to eliminate stereotyping, including doing the tomahawk chop, or wearing warpaint and headdresses at games. In February 2021, the district board voted 4–1 to retire the mascot in response to Indigenous people advocating change, while students and alumni sought to retain it. In July the Red-Tailed Hawk was selected as the new mascot although the logo is "Cheyenne Mountain Hawks" with two feathers.
Chowchilla High School	Chowchilla	California	Redskins	Tribe	2016	School plans to retain Native American imagery.
Cincinnati Country Day School	Cincinnati	Ohio	Indians	Nighthawks	2020	The school board voted to change the mascot in August 2020, with overwhelming support of the community. Nighthawks was selected in January 2021.
Clinton Central School District	Clinton	New York	Warriors	Comets	2023	In 2022 to 2023, when the administration made the community vote on various names, the superintendent had to explain multiple times why the name had to change since the Warriors name was used in the 1950s and its been connected too close to the Native American culture.
Clinton Community Schools	Clinton	Michigan	Redskins	Redwolves	2020	In 2010 the school said it would keep the name as long as it was being used by the Washington NFL team.
Colonie Central High School	Colonie	New York	Raiders	Wolfpack	2023	
Clover Park High School	Lakewood	Washington	Warriors	Timberwolves	2022	
Columbia River High School	Vancouver	Washington	Chieftain	The Rapids	2020	Although the Washington State Board of Education issued a resolution advising schools to review their use of Native American mascots, Columbia River students voted in May, 2019 to retain their mascot. In September 2020 the board responded to local tribal leaders and a petition by voting unanimously to retire the mascot at the high school, and also Minnehaha Elementary School.
Colusa High School	Colusa	California	Redskins	RedHawks	2012	
Colville High School	Colville	Washington	Indians	Crimson Hawks	2021	
Comsewogue High School	Port Jefferson Station	New York	Warriors	Spartans	2024	
Conard High School	West Hartford	Connecticut	Chieftain	Red Wolves	2022	After a meeting with local voices for and against, the Board of Education voted 5-2 change mascot.
Connetquot High School	Bohemia	New York	Thunderbirds	T-Birds	2025	Name changed in compromise with New York State.
Conrad Schools of Science	Wilmington	Delaware	Redskins	Red Wolves	2017	The name was dropped in June 2016 The "Red Wolves" was selected by a student vote in February, 2017.
Cooperstown Junior-Senior High School	Cooperstown	New York	Redskins	Hawkeyes	2013	Students voted to change the mascot over the objections of alumni and parents. In appreciation the Oneida Tribe of New York donated $10,000 to assist with the cost of the change.
Copper Cliff	Sudbury	Ontario	Braves	Crushers	2013	
Corinth Central High School	Corinth	New York	Tomahawks	River Hawks	2023	To comply with state mandate, the school board voted for the name change after surveying students and residents.
Coxsackie-Athens High School	Coxsackie	New York	Indians	Riverhawks	2021	In addition to the new mascot, the school district will develop a K-12 cirriculum to educate on the Indigenous peoples of our region.
Cross Keys High School	Atlanta	Georgia	Indians	Phoenix	2024	
Cuyahoga Heights High School	Cuyahoga Heights	Ohio	Redskins	Red Wolves	2021	Until a news mascot is selected, the school will be known as "Heights". Imagery associated with the old name on uniforms and surfaces will be removed by normal replacement.
Danville High School	Danville	Vermont	Indians	Bears	2020	The school board voted to eliminate the Indians mascot in March 2020. Students selected the Bears in December 2021.
David and Mary Thomson Collegiate Institute	Scarborough	Ontario	Redmen	Titans	2005	
Edmondson-Westside High School	Baltimore	Maryland	Redskins	Red Storm	2002	
Edgewood Junior/Senior High School	Brevard County	Florida	Indians	Red Wolves	2021	An advisory committee voted unanimously to begin the process of changing the mascot.
Enterprise High School	Enterprise	Oregon	Savages	Outlaws	1997	
Esko High School	Esko	Minnesota	Eskomos	none	2023	
Fairview High School	Fairview Park	Ohio	Warriors	N/A	2019	Native imagery replaced by gladiator, name kept.
Farmington High School	Farmington	Connecticut	Indians	River Hawks	2020	After debating the name since the 1990s, Farmington's school board appointed a committee in early 2020 that concluded the name should go.
Flint Central High School	Flint	Michigan	Indians	Phoenix	2005	
Fonda-Fultonville High School	Fonda, New York	New York	Braves	Valley Hawks	2023	State mascot advisory panel rejected plan to keep the name sponsored by an individual that did not represent a Federally recognized tribe.
Foxborough High School	Foxborough	Massachusetts	Warriors	N/A	2023	School is changing logo but keeping the name.
Frederick High School	Frederick	Colorado	Warriors	Golden Eagles	2021	The school will change its mascot in response to new state law.
Fresno High School	Fresno	California	Warriors	N/A	2020	Name will remain, but Native American images will be removed.
Frontier Regional School	Deerfield	Massachusetts	Redskins	Red Hawks	2000	
Gardena High School	Los Angeles	California	Mohican	Panther	1997	Located in the Harbor Gateway neighborhood of LA.
Gar-Field Senior High School	Woodbridge	Virginia	Indian	Red Wolves	2021	A committee will select a new mascot from those submitted by alumni, students, a community members.
General William J. Palmer High School	Colorado Springs	Colorado	Terrors	N/A	1985	Did not change the name but the original mascot was a caricature of a Native American called "Eagle Beak", replaced with an Eagle.
Glastonbury High School	Glastonbury	Connecticut	Tomahawks	Guardians	2020	The board of education voted 7–1 to retire the mascot, citing racial insensitivity.
Glens Falls High School	Glens Falls	New York	Indians	Black Bears	2023	The student body chose Black Bears from four mascot choices in March 2023.
Glenwood High School	Chatham	Illinois	Redskins	Titans	2001	
Goffstown High School	Goffstown	New Hampshire	Redskins	Grizzlies	1994	
Goshen High School	Goshen	Indiana	Redskins	Redhawks	2016	
Grafton High School	Grafton	Wisconsin	Blackhawks	Black Hawks	1998	
Grand Forks Central High School	Grand Forks	North Dakota	Redskins	Knights	1992	
Grand Rapids High School	Grand Rapids	Minnesota	Indians	Thunderhawks	1995	
Green Mountain Union High School	Chester	Vermont	Chieftains	Grizzlies	2023	
Guilford High School	Guilford	Connecticut	Indians	Grizzlies	2020	The School Board voted unanimously in favor of the change.
Gustine High School	Gustine	California	Redskins	Reds	2016	Became the first to comply with the Californian state law, adopting the name used by the school from 1913 to 1936.
H.C. Wilcox Technical High School	Meriden	Connecticut	Indians	Wildcats	2021	
Half Hollow Hills East High School	Dix Hills	New York	Thunderbirds	Red Hawks	2024	
Hall High School	West Hartford	Connecticut	Warriors	Titans	2022	In 2012 the vote was to keep the name, but remove Native American imagery. In 2022, the Board of Education voted to change the name also.
Hanover High School	Hanover	Massachusetts	Indians	Hawks	2020	A mascot selection committee received 89 suggestions for a replacement.
Hart High School	Newhall, Santa Clarita	California	Indians	Hawks	2021	Beginning with an online petition in 2020, thousands of students favored changing the name, but in 2021 a survey found that a majority of students favored keeping the mascot. In July 2021 the school governing board voted to begin a process to remove the name and imagery by 2025. The Hawks was selected as the new mascot in March 2024.
Hartford High School	Hartford	Michigan	Indians	Huskies	2021	In 2021 Hartford Public Schools announced retirement the Indian mascot for the end of the 2021–2022 school year. The Huskies was selected as the new name in April, 2022.
Henderson High School	West Chester	Pennsylvania	Warriors	N/A	2020	The school will keep the name but remove Native American imagery.
Hiawatha High School	Hiawatha	Kansas	Redskins	Red Hawks	2001	
Hinkley High School	Aurora	Colorado	Thunderbirds	Thunder	2022	In compliance with state law, the Thunderbirds mascot has been removed from three local schools.
Hot Springs High School	Hot Springs	Montana	Savages	Savage Heat	2007	
Huntley High School	Huntley	Illinois	Redskins	Red Raiders	2002	Native American Bar Association threatened litigation.
Idaho School for the Deaf and the Blind	Gooding	Idaho	Redskins	Raptors	1990	
Immaculate Conception High School	Lodi	New Jersey	Apaches	Blue Wolves	2004	
Indian River Central High School	Philadelphia	New York	Warriors	Wolves	2023	
Iowa Falls-Alden High School	Iowa Falls	Iowa	Redskins	Cadets	1999	
Iroquois High School	Buffalo	New York	Chiefs	Red Hawks	2023	
Iroquois High School	Elma	New York	Chiefs	Red Hawks	2023	
James S. Rickards High School	Tallahassee	Florida	Redskins	Raiders	2000	
Jamestown High School	Jamestown	New York	Red Raiders	Red & Green	2022	A "big cat" logo was used with the raiders name from the 1930s to the 1970s, when a Native American logo was first used. This was replaced with a "J" with feathers in 2014. The 2022 decision removed the feathers, and the current proposal is to restore a modernized version of the big cat.
Jefferson High School	Daly City	California	Indians	Grizzlies	2015	
John Jay High School	Cross River	New York	Indians	Wolves	2019	The Katonah-Lewisboro Board of Education reached a consensus to replace the mascot, noting that some in the community may find it offensive.
John Swett High School	Crockett	California	Indians	Warriors	2015	While dropping the Indian name, adoption of the Warriors is seen by many as a way of retaining Native American imagery.
Kalama Middle/High School	Kalama	Washington	Chinook	N/A	2021	The prior logo featuring "Charlie Chinook", a cartoon Native American character has been replaced by a salmon.
Keshequa High School	Nunda	New York	Indians	Wildcats	2024	
Killingly High School	Killingly	Connecticut	Redmen	Trailblazers	2024	Renewed discussion in 2019 of whether the mascot is offensive was prompted by a student initiative. After input from the Nipmuc Tribal Council that no Native mascots are flattering, the school board decided to change the name. In October, "Red Hawks" was chosen initially as the new mascot by the Board of Education. However, the name change became an issue in the 2019 municipal elections, leading to record turnout and Republican victories. In December after a contentious meeting the Board decided to have no mascot. In January, 2020 the new school board, now with a Republican majority, voted to reinstate the Redmen mascot. Calling the change and reversion "a mockery of the process", Connecticut Speaker of the House Joe Aresimowicz announced the consideration of legislation to ban all Native American nicknames and logos statewide which would effect 19 high schools, including Killingly. In February 2024, the school board again formed a committee to review the name and mascot. In November, that committee voted to retire the Redmen name and mascot. There were no immediate plans for a replacement.
La Crosse Central High School	La Crosse	Wisconsin	Red Raiders	RiverHawks	2020	The logo was changed from a Native American image to a Knight in the 1990s.
La Veta High School	La Veta	Colorado	Redskins	Redhawks	2020	After a contentious discussion, the La Vita School Board vote 3–1 to retire the mascot and appoint a committee to select another.
Lamar High School	Lamar	Colorado	Savages	Thunder	2022	"Savage Thunder" was originally proposed as the new name, accompanied by a bison logo. Savage was then dropped when the state commission reject the proposal.
Lamar High School	Houston	Texas	Redskins	Texans	2014	Houston ISD voted to change racially insensitive mascots.
Lancaster High School	Lancaster	New York	Redskins	Legends	2015	After contentious community meetings, the school board voted to retire the name. The new name was selected by a vote by students.
Lane Technical College Prep High School	Chicago	Illinois	Indians	Champions	2020	The mascot was retired in August after a month-long period of consideration which included input from the American Indian Center and a questionnaire which found overwhelming support for change among students, faculty, staff and alumni.
Lemont High School	Lemont	Illinois	Indians	TBD	2021	The school board voted unanimously to phase out the old mascot.
Letchworth High School	Gainesville	New York	Indians	Legends	2023	
Loveland High School	Loveland	Colorado	Indians	Red Wolves	2020	One of two mascots retired by the Thompson School District Board of Education as racist and offensive. Bill Reed Middle School that had previously been the "Redskins" changed to the "Warriors" in 1995; but now will select a new mascot.
Lyme Central High School	Chaumont	New York	Indians	Lakers	2022	
McClymonds High School	Oakland	California	Warriors	N/A	2021	Students led an effort to adopt African warrior imagery for the school.
Mahopac High School	Mahopac	New York	Indians	Wolf Pac	2023	
Manchester High School	Manchester	Connecticut	Indians	Red Hawks	2019	The Manchester Board of Education voted to change the nickname and mascot.
Manhasset Secondary School	Manhasset, New York	New York	Indians	Manhasset	2024	Officially, there will be no mascot, Manhasset or "Set" being used to refer to the team.
Manistee Middle / High School	Manistee	Michigan	Chippewa	Mariners	2022	
Marion High School	Marion	Iowa	Indians	Wolves	2020	MISD board of education voted 5–2 in favor of change. The first replacement was to be the "Mavericks", but upon finding the name derives from a Texas slave owner, Wolves was selected.
Marist High School	Chicago	Illinois	Redskins	Redhawks	1997	Change was discussed, then made with little comment except a few alumni.
Marquette Senior High School	Marquette	Michigan	Redmen	Sentinels	2023	
Marshall High School	Marshall	Michigan	Redskins	Redhawks	2005	
Mason City High School	Mason City	Iowa	Mohawks	River Hawks	2021	
Massena Central High School	Massena	New York	Red Raiders	Raiders	2001—2023 (See note)	While remaining the Red Raiders, the Indian head logo was phased out 2001–2004. The new Spartan logo was not approved until 2018, so unofficial use of the prior logo continued. In 2023, the name was changed to simply Raiders.
Meadowdale High School	Edmonds	Washington	Chiefs	Mavericks	1999	
Mechanicville High School	Halfmoon	New York	Red Raiders	TBD		
Melrose High School	Melrose	Massachusetts	Red Raiders	Red Hawks	2021	
Menomonee Falls High School	Menomonee Falls	Wisconsin	Indians	Phoenix	2020	
Milford High School	Highland	Michigan	Redskins	Mavericks	2002	
Millard South High School	Omaha	Nebraska	Indians	Patriots	2000	
Minnehaha Academy	Minneapolis	Minnesota	Indians	Redhawks	1990	A private Christian school
Minisink Valley Central High School	Slate Hill	New York	Warriors	N/A	2023	Replacing Native American image with "MV" logo.
Mohawk High School	Marcola	Oregon	Mohawk Indians	Mustangs	2017	Name derived from Mohawk Valley.
Mohawk Trail Regional High School	Buckland	Massachusetts	Warriors	N/A	2022	Name retained, but Native American imagery removed.
Mohonasen High School	Rotterdam	New York	Warriors	N/A	2023	
Montevideo High School	Montevideo	Minnesota	Mohawks	Thunderhawks	2015	
Montrose High School	Montrose	Colorado	Indians	Red Hawks	2021	Change is being made in response to new state law.
Montville High School	Oakdale	Connecticut	Indians	Wolves	2022	
Morris Community High School	Morris	Illinois	Redskins	Chiefs	2022	The school board voted to change the mascot in 2022, the new name was selected in 2026
Morrisville-Eaton High School	Morrisville	New York	Warriors	Mavericks	2024	
Moses Lake High School	Moses Lake	Washington	Chiefs	Mavericks	2022	To comply with state law, and a decision by the Confederated Tribes of the Colville Reservation, the change also includes two middle schools in the district.
Mountain Empire High School	Pine Valley	California	Redskins	Redhawks	1997	
Napa High School	Napa	California	Indians	Grizzlies	2018	A school district committee recommended changing the mascot in 2017, which aroused some opposition. However, a new mascot was selected in August, 2018 by students and staff.
Naperville Central High School	Naperville	Illinois	Redskins	Redhawks	1992	Alumni retained an attachment to the old name, but most think the change was a good one.
Nashoba Regional High School	Bolton	Massachusetts	Chieftains	Wolves	2021	
Natick High School	Natick	Massachusetts	Redmen	Redhawks	2012	Change voted 2007, new name selected 2012.
Nauset Regional High School	Eastham	Massachusetts	Warriors	N/A	2008	Name retained, but all references to Native Americans removed.
Newington High School	Newington	Connecticut	Indians	Nor’Easters	2021	School board vote followed trend of other Connecticut high schools.
Nezperce High School	Nezperce	Idaho	Indians	Nighthawks	2020	In January 2014 the Nez Perce Tribal Executive Committee sent a letter to the school district asking that the mascot be changed. The school began de-emphasizing Native imagery, and used a block "N" as its logo. The school board voted to retire the mascot in July 2020 with a committee to select a new name in September. Nighthawks was selected in December, 2020.
Niles West High School	Skokie	Illinois	Indians	Wolves	2002	The name Indians was dropped and the new name Wolves was voted in by student vote and internet polling.
Niskayuna High School	Niskayuna	New York	Mohawks	Silver Warriors	2023	
North Central High School	Spokane	Washington	Indians	Wolfpack	2021	In addition to the high school, the Spokane Public Schools board unanumously approved retiring the mascots at Sheridan Elementary and Garry Middle School.
North Douglas High School	Drain	Oregon	Warriors	N/A	2016	Name will be retained, but the mascot "Willie the Warrior" will be retired at the end of the 2016 school year and other Native American imagery will be removed.
North Haven High School	North Haven	Connecticut	Indians	Nighthawks	2021	Although there had been movement toward changing the mascot in recent years, the final unanimous decision by the school board came in response to a decision to withhold any Connecticut school's share of revenue from Native American gaming if they retained the mascot.
North Quincy High School	Quincy	Massachusetts	Red Raiders	Raiders	2020	Changed the logo from Native American to revolutionary war era clothing
North River High School	Cosmopolis	Washington	Redskins	Mustangs	1995	
North Side High School	Fort Wayne	Indiana	Redskins	Legends	2015	The school's yearbook had always been the Legend.
Northwest Catholic High School	West Hartford	Connecticut	Indians	Lions	2015	
Norwalk High School	Norwalk	Iowa	Warriors	N/A	2020	Name will be retained, but Native American imagery will be removed.
Nyack High School	Upper Nyack	New York	Indians	Redhawks	2020	Name dropped by a unanimous vote of the school board citing movement away from Native mascots by professional teams.
Oak Park High School	Oak Park	Michigan	Redskins	Knights	1990	
Odessa-Montour High School	Odessa	New York	Indians	Grizzlies	2022	Change prompted by discussions between school leaders and members of the Seneca Nation of New York.
Okemos High School	Okemos	Michigan	Chieftains/Chiefs	Wolves	2021	A debate since the 1990s, the school had agreed in 2004 to phase out Chieftains in favor of Chiefs, a more direct reference to the town's namesake. The main issue currently is the cost, projecting 2023 for the completion of the change.
Oneida High School	Oneida	New York	Indians	Express	2023	
Onteora High School	Boiceville	New York	Indian	Eagle	2016	
Oriskany High School	Oriskany	New York	Redskins	Skyhawks	2024	
Osseo-Fairchild High School	Osseo	Wisconsin	Chieftains	Thunder	2010	
Ossining High School	Ossining	New York	Indians	Lion	2002	In June 2002, the school changed its mascot to Riverhawk, but after opposition from the student body, the team became 'O' in 2007. In 2024, the mascot became the Lion
Owatonna Senior High School	Owatonna	Minnesota	Indians	Huskies	1994	
Owego Free Academy High School	Owego	New York	Indians	River Hawks	2023	
Park High School	Cottage Grove	Minnesota	Indians	Wolfpack	1994	An "Indian Head" mosaic created in 1965 in the main hallway of the school has become the subject of contention between Native Americans and their supporters who want it removed, and others in the community who consider it a work of art and part of the school's history.
Parsippany High School	Parsippany-Troy Hills	New Jersey	Redskins	Redhawks	2001	
Pascack Valley High School	Hillsdale	New Jersey	Indians	Panthers	2020	The Pascack Valley Regional District High School Board of Education voted to change both the "Cowboys" of Pascack Hills HS and the "Indians" at Pascack Valley.
Paw Paw High School	Paw Paw	Michigan	Redskins	Red Wolves	2020	Having voted to retain the mascot in 2017, the school board decided to end the continuing controversy in March 2020 and retire the name at the end of the school year. In July 2020 the school board voted to accept Red Wolves as the new name.
Penfield High School	Penfield	New York	Chiefs	Patriots	2001	
Pentucket Regional High School	West Newbury	Massachusetts	Sachem	Panthers	2022	Criticism of the mascot began in 2016, but the school board voted to retain the mascot With the attention to racial justice as an issue in June 2020, the name again drew scrutiny, noting the lack of Native American education at the school, and the name referring to an honorific that is inappropriate for a sports team. The change decision was made in June, 2022.
Peru High School	Peru	New York	Indians	Nighthawks	2021	
Petoskey High School	Petoskey	Michigan	Northmen	N/A	2020	The school board voted unanimously to retire the Native American logo used by the Northmen. The nearby Little Traverse Bay Bands of Odawa Indians passed a resolution in 2005 condemning the use of Native American mascots.
Pocatello High School	Pocatello	Idaho	Indians	Thunder	2020	In response to the change of mascots at other Idaho schools in 2019, Pocatello supporters indicated that they would oppose change, "Indians" not being the same as Reskins or Savages. In 2020, the Pocatello-Chubbuck School Board voted to retire the mascot, but not effective until the end of the school year.
Port Huron High School	Port Huron	Michigan	Big Reds	Redhawks	2023	Two elementary schools also have new mascots.
Port Townsend High School	Port Townsend	Washington	Redskins	Redhawks	2014	
Potomac High School	Oxon Hill	Maryland	Braves	Wolverines	2001	
Poynette High School	Poynette	Wisconsin	Indians	Pumas	2009	
Radnor High School	Radnor Township	Pennsylvania	Raiders	Raptors	2020	The school board voted 8–1 to retire the name and Native American imagery as offensive, a replacement to be selected later.
Ramay Junior High School	Fayetteville	Arkansas	Indians	Red Wolves	2019	In April, 2019 a decision has been made by referendum to replace the Ramay "Indians" with a new mascot in 2020.
Reading Memorial High School	Reading	Massachusetts	Redmen	Rockets		
Red Cloud Indian School	Pine Ridge Indian Reservation	South Dakota	Chiefs	Crusaders		
Red Jacket High School	Shortsville	New York	Indians	Cardinals	2024	
Red Lodge High School	Red Lodge	Montana	Redskins	Rams	2011	The trustees of the school favored a change, while the community was divided.
Reedsport Community Charter School	Reedsport	Oregon	Braves	Brave	2016	The school board decided to change name and remove Native American imagery.
Renton High School	Renton	Washington	Indians	Redhawks	2021	Change is in response to new state law.
RHAM High School	Hebron	Connecticut	Sachems	Raptors	2020	Discussion of change began in February, 2020 in response to opposition to the mascot, including the Mohican Tribe stating that they no longer support the use of Native American mascots in Connecticut.
Richfield Springs Central School	Richfield Springs	New York	Indians	Eagles	2023	The school announced on January 18, 2023, that the name would officially be retired at the conclusion of the school year and a new name would be selected.
Romulus Central High School	Romulus	New York	Warriors	Royals	2023	
Roy C. Ketcham High School	Wappingers Falls	New York	Indians	Storm	2023	
Runnymede Collegiate Institute	Toronto	Ontario	Redmen	Ravens	1994	
Rutland High School	Rutland	Vermont	Raiders	Rutland	2022	After years of local controversy that included a name change and a reversal, the school board voted to make the school mascot "Rutland" in 2023.
St. Joseph High School	South Bend	Indiana	Indians	Huskies	2023	A committee including students, faculty and parents recommended the change and adopted the new mascot.
Salesian High School	Richmond	California	Chieftains	"Pride" the Lion	2006	
Sandusky High School	Sandusky	Michigan	Redskins	Wolves	2022	In April 2022, the Sandusky Community Schools Board of Education voted to retire its mascot at the end of the current school year. However, in August 2024, the board voted to incorporate the previous logo back into school affairs for historical tribute purposes.
Sanford High School	Sanford	Colorado	Indians	Mustangs	2022	Change in response to state law.
Sanford High School	Sanford	Maine	Redskins	Spartans	2012	New mascot select by students.
Saranac Central High School	Dannemora	New York	Chiefs	Spartans	2023	
Saranac High School	Saranac	Michigan	Redskins	Redhawks	2021	
Saranac Lake High School	Saranac Lake	New York	Redskins	Red Storm	2001	
Saugatuck High School	Saugatuck	Michigan	Indians	Trailblazers	2020	Stating that the mascot was reexamined in light of recent changes by other teams, the Board of Education voted unanymousy to retire the "Indians".
Sauk Rapids-Rice High School	Sauk Rapids	Minnesota	Indians	Storm	1995	
Scarborough High School	Scarborough	Maine	Redskins	Red Storm	2001	
Schoharie High School	Schoharie	New York	Indians	Storm	2023	
Scotch Plains-Fanwood High School	Union County	New Jersey	Raiders	N/A	2004	Although the Native American logo was replaced in 2004 by a generic figure with a sword and shield, fans continued to wear the old logo and appear at games in Native American headdresses. The more professionally designed logo for 2018 of a Knight in Armor is intended to reference a Scottish tradition.
Seneca High School	Seneca	Wisconsin	Indians	Royals	2021	Although meeting attendees spoke in favor of retaining the name, the board voted unanimously to drop the Indians mascot, citing the actions of the Washington NFL and Cleveland MLB teams as indicative of the social opposition to the usage.
Sequoia High School	Redwood City	California	Cherokee	Ravens	2019	
Seneca High School MCA	Louisville	Kentucky	Redskins	RedHawks	1997	
Seneca Valley Senior High School	Pittsburgh	Pennsylvania	Raiders	N/A	2021	The entire school district will remain the "Raiders" but discontinue use of Native American imagery including mascot costumes.
Sewanhaka High School	Floral Park	New York	Indians	Ravens	2024	
Sexton High School	Lansing	Michigan	Big Reds	J-Dubbs	2022	
Shawnee Mission North High School	Overland Park	Kansas	Indians	Bison	2021	The Shawnee Mission USD 512 voted unanimously in favor of a policy that school mascots be culturally and racially sensitive and appropriate. In addition to Shawnee Mission North, three elementary schools will change their mascots.
Shelter Island High School	Shelter Island	New York	Indians	Islanders	2020	
Shorewood High School	Shoreline	Washington	Thunderbirds	Stormrays	2021	A new mascot will be selected to comply with Washington State law.
Skowhegan Area High School	Skowhegan	Maine	Indians	RiverHawks	2019	After receiving opposition to the "Indians" name from the Penobscot Nation and the ACLU of Maine, the school board voted in March 2019 to eliminate the mascot.
Sleepy Eye High School	Sleepy Eye	Minnesota	Indians	Storm	2024	
South Bend High School	South Bend	Washington	Indians	Bears	2021	
Southern Cayuga High School	Poplar Ridge	New York	Chiefs	Falcons	2023	The original replacement was set to be Cougars, but the Board of Education refused to approve the name due to "negative connotations." District residents re-voted for the Falcons name in November 2023.
Syosset High School	Syosset	New York	Braves	TBD	2023	While voting to comply with the New York state order, the school district will be seeking ways for the state to pay for the estimated $70,000 it will cost to do so.
Taconic High School	Pittsfield	Massachusetts	Braves	Thunder	2020	Logo adjusted as of 2019, name dropped by 5–1 vote of the school committee in August, 2020.
Talawanda High School	Oxford	Ohio	Braves	Brave	2018	In June, 2018 the Native American Rights Fund sent a six-page letter detailing its opposition to the name and logo, including the testimony of a former student who stated that she was bullied after identifying herself as Native American. The Talawanda School District has formed a committee to study the issue. In November, 2018 the Board of Education voted 3–2 to change the name from Braves to Brave and phase out Native American references.
Tamalpais High School	Mill Valley	California	Indians	Red-Tailed Hawks	1990	
Teton High School	Driggs	Idaho	Redskins	Timberwolves	2019	The school board for the Teton School District voted 4–1 to retire the nickname with the stipulation no taxpayer money goes toward the removal process; after two of Idaho's largest Native American tribes, the Shoshone-Bannock and the Nez Perce urged the change, citing the word's offensive definition by major dictionaries and its use as a racial slur.
The Dalles-Wahtonka High School	The Dalles	Oregon	Indian Eagles	Riverhawks	2014	Prior to a district merger in the early 2000s The Dalles High School were the "Indians", and Wahtonka the "Eagles", with TDHS using a logo essentially identical to Chief Wahoo.
Thomson Collegiate Institute	Scarborough	Ontario	Redmen	Titans	2005	
Thunderbird High School	Phoenix	Arizona	Chiefs	Titans	2020	The school board's unianymous vote was in response to a student petition for change. In prior years there was discussion based upon the logo being a Native American in full headdress, which is not worn by any tribe in Arizona.
Toledo High School	Toledo	Washington	Indians	Riverhawks	2021	After initially seeking to retain their mascot following the passage of a state law, the school decided to rebrand.
Tonawanda High School	Tonawanda	New York	Warriors	Timberwolves	2023	
Touchet High School	Touchet	Washington	Indians	Redhawks	2022	Change per state law.
Tulare Union High School	Tulare	California	Redskins	Tribe	2022	One of the schools in California the changed its Redskins mascot in compliance with a state law in 2016, Tulare became the Tribe in order to retain Native American imagery. In 2022 they became the Red Hawks with is new logo and mascot.
Turners Falls High School	Montague	Massachusetts	Indians	Thunder	2017	Both the school and Turners Falls, Massachusetts are named in honor of Capt. William Turner, who led troops into a battle during King Philip's War where 300 Native Americans were killed. Citing the viewpoints of Native Americans and historians, the Gill-Montague Regional School Committee voted to change the "Indians" mascot in February 2017, which prompted a walkout protest by about 120 students.
Union High School	Tulsa	Oklahoma	Redskins	Redhawks	2020	Voted unanimously by the Union School Board
Unionville High School	Kennett Square	Pennsylvania	Indians	Longhorns	2020	After years of community contention, on August 24, 2020, the Unionville-Chadds Ford School Board voted unanimously to retire the mascot, a replacement to be selected by a committee with input from the Lenape Tribe.
Vallejo High School	Vallejo	California	Apaches	RedHawks	2014	
Wakefield Memorial High School	Wakefield	Massachusetts	Warriors	N/A	2021	The name will remain, but the logo will be changed by a 5–2 vote of the school board. Subsequently, a non-binding referendum was placed on the ballot in the next election, the change having become a polarizing issue between older and more recent residents of the town. The result of the referendum was 55% in favor of keeping the logo, however the decision remains with the school board.
Warrenton High School	Warrenton	Oregon	Braves	Warriors	2015	Native American images removed. In addition, the grade school in the same school distinct will change from "Braves" to Warriors.
Washington Middle School	Missoula	Montana	Warriors	Wildcats		Native American images removed circa 1992, replaced with Viking images but maintaining the Warriors nickname. Nickname later changed to Wildcats.
Waterloo High School	Waterloo	New York	Indians	Tigers	2022	The school board previously voted to drop the Indians over some local opposition. Four animal names were offered as a replacement, Tigers being selected in June.
Watertown High School	Watertown	Connecticut	Indians	Warriors	2021	In January 2021 the board of education voted 4–3 to remove the name in response to a letter from over 400 alumni and community members, becoming the seventh Connecticut school to change its nickname since 2019. Warriors was selected as the new mascot, with a new logo design to be selected by a contest in Spring 2022.
Watertown High School	Watertown	Massachusetts	Red Raiders	Raiders	2008	
Waterville Jr/Sr High School	Waterville	New York	Indians	Eagles	2023	
Watkins Glen Central School	Watkins Glen	New York	Senecas	Lake Hawks	2023	
Wauwatosa East High School	Wauwatosa	Wisconsin	Red Raiders	N/A	2010	Nickname retained, but mascot changed to a pirate.
Webutuck High School	Amenia	New York	Warriors	Wildcats	2023	
Weedsport Junior/Senior High School	Weedsport	New York	Warriors	Wolverines	2023	
Weldon Valley Junior/Senior High School	Weldona	Colorado	Warriors	N/A	2021	New logo selected eliminates Native imagery.
Wells High School	Wells	Maine	Warriors	N/A	2018	The school will remain the Warriors, but remove all Native American imagery.
Wells High School	Wells	New York	Indians	Wildcats	2023	The school board voted to comply with the New York State Education Department requirement to remove Native mascots.
West Seneca West Senior High School	West Seneca	New York	Indians	Warhawks	2023	
Weyauwega-Fremont High School	Weyauwega	Wisconsin	Indians	Warhawks	2020	
Wichita North High School	Wichita	Kansas	Redskins	Redhawks	2021	The name will be phased out over the next two school years, and a Native American studies program will be initiated.
Willsboro Central High School	Willsboro	New York	Warriors	Wolves	2024	
Wilton High School	Wilton	Connecticut	Warriors	N/A	2021	The removal of a lance with feathers from "W" logo is indicative of moving away from Native American imagery while retaining the Warriors name.
Winchester High School	Winchester	Massachusetts	Sachems	Red & Black	2020	After a contentious meeting, a school committee voted to retire the name.
Winnacunnet High School	Hampton	New Hampshire	Warriors	N/A	2020	The name will remain, but Native American imagery will change.
Wiscasset High School	Wiscasset	Maine	Redskins	Wolverines	2011	Change was approved in 2011, but the Redskins name was retained until the end of the school year. The new name was then selected by a public poll. In August, 2014 selectmen of the town of Wiscasset voted to name a private road "Redskins Drive" as an indication of their continued attachment to the name of the school. However, following weeks of criticism by members of Maine's Indian tribes and others, a second vote changed the name again, to Micmac Drive.
Woonsocket High School	Woonsocket	South Dakota	Redmen	Blackhawks	2016	
Wyoming Central School	Wyoming	New York	Indians	Mighty Eagles	2023	
Ypsilanti High School	Ypsilanti	Michigan	Braves	Grizzlies	2006	
Yuma High School	Yuma	Colorado	Indians	Outlaws	2022	Yuma's teams went by Yuma for the 2022-23 school year before selecting Outlaws as the new mascot.

== See also ==
- List of sports team names and mascots derived from indigenous peoples
- Native American mascot controversy
- List of contemporary ethnic groups
- Confederate mascots
