= Wilson Júnior =

Wilson Júnior or Wilson Jr. may refer to:

- Wilson Júnior (footballer, born 1976), Brazilian football goalkeeper
- Wilson Júnior (footballer, born 1991), Brazilian football forward
- Wilson Fittipaldi Júnior (born 1943), Brazilian former racing driver

== See also ==
- Woodrow Wilson Junior College (disambiguation)
- Wilson Junior High School
