= Cotter High School =

Cotter High School can refer to:

- Cotter High School (Winona, Minnesota)
- Cotter High School (Cotter, Arkansas)
