= Avinger Independent School District =

School district in Texas

Location
- 245 Connor St. Avinger, Texas ESC Region 8 USA
- Coordinates: 32°54′8″N 94°33′42″W

District information
- Type: Independent school district
- Grades: K through 12
- Superintendent: Adam Chandler
- Schools: 2 (2009-10)
- NCES District ID: 4809090

Students and staff
- Students: 138 (2010-11)
- Teachers: 18.47 (2009-10) (on full-time equivalent (FTE) basis)
- Student–teacher ratio: 6.98 (2009-10)
- Athletic conference: UIL Class 1A Basketball Division II
- District mascot: Indians
- Colors: Maroon, White

Other information
- TEA District Accountability Rating for 2011-12: Recognized
- Website: Avinger ISD

Avinger Independent School District is a public school district based in Avinger, Texas (USA). The district is located in southwestern Cass County and extends into a portion of Marion County.

== Finances ==
As of the 2010–2011 school year, the appraised valuation of property in the district was $51,670,000. The maintenance tax rate was $0.117 and the bond tax rate was $0.011 per $100 of appraised valuation.

== Academic achievement ==
In 2011, the school district was rated "recognized" by the Texas Education Agency. Thirty-five percent of districts in Texas in 2011 received the same rating. No state accountability ratings will be given to districts in 2012. A school district in Texas can receive one of four possible rankings from the Texas Education Agency: Exemplary (the highest possible ranking), Recognized, Academically Acceptable, and Academically Unacceptable (the lowest possible ranking).

Historical district TEA accountability ratings

- 2011: Recognized
- 2010: Recognized
- 2009: Recognized
- 2008: Recognized
- 2007: Recognized
- 2006: Recognized
- 2005: Academically Acceptable
- 2004: Academically Acceptable

== Schools ==
As of the 2011–2012 school year, the district had one school, Avinger School. From at least 2004 through 2010, there was a separate Avinger Elementary School.

== Special programs ==
=== Athletics ===
Avinger High School participates in the boys sports of basketball and wrestling. The school participates in the girls sport of basketball. For the 2012 through 2014 school years, Avinger High School will play basketball in UIL Class 1A Division II.

== See also ==
- List of school districts in Texas
- List of high schools in Texas
