= Killingly High School =

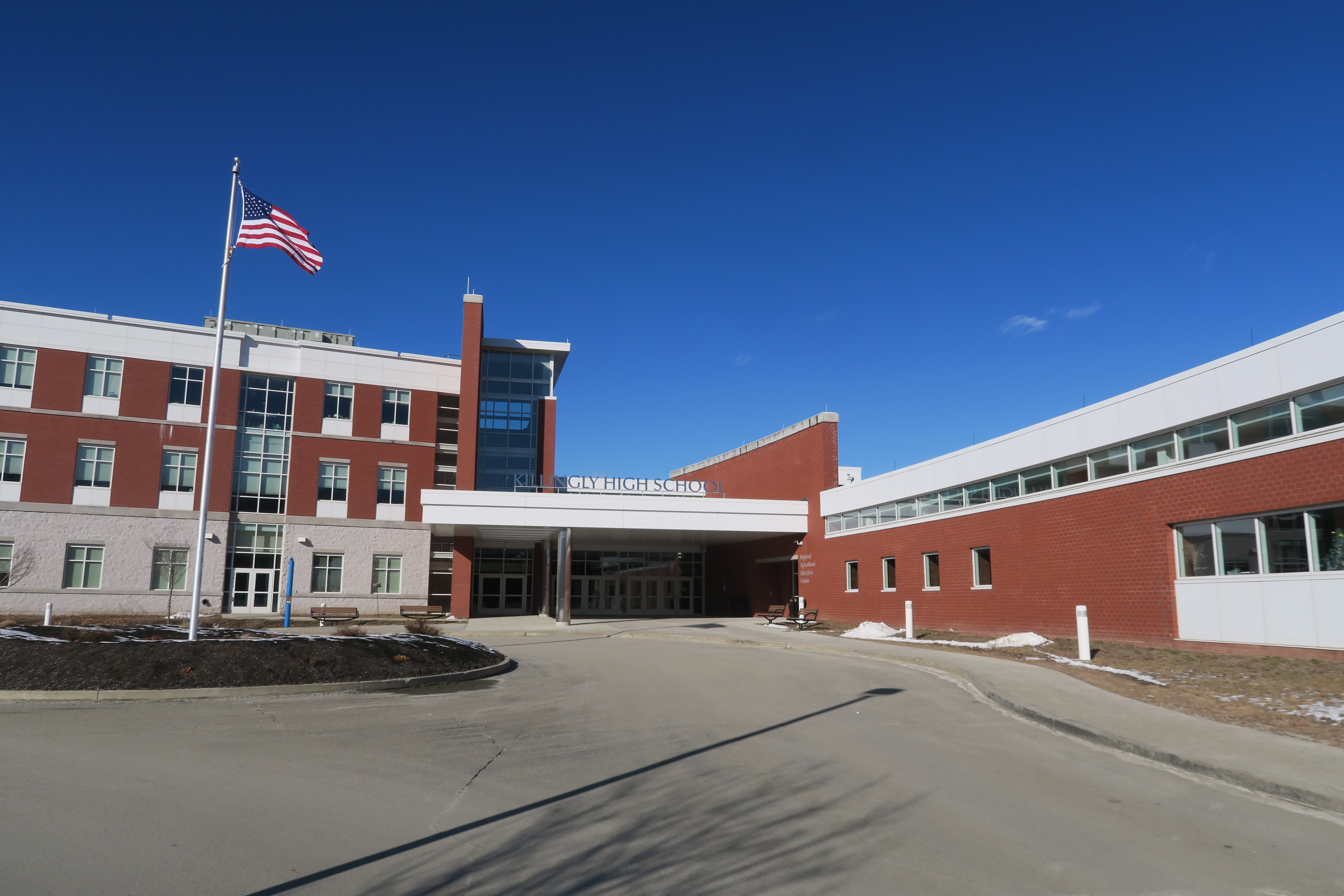
- Killingly High School

Location
- 226 Putnam Pike; Killingly, Connecticut 06241; United States; 41°51′36″N 71°52′24″W

Information
- Type: Public high school
- Motto: Great Things Happen Here!
- Established: 1908 (118 years ago)
- School district: Killingly School District
- Superintendent: Dr. Paul Haughey
- CEEB code: 070135
- NCES School ID: 090207000392
- Principal: Carrie Apanovitch
- Teaching staff: 65.05 (FTE)
- Grades: 9 to 12
- Gender: Co-educational
- Enrollment: 762 (2023–2024)
- Student to teacher ratio: 11.71
- Campus type: Rural
- Colors: Maroon and white
- Athletics conference: Eastern Connecticut Conference
- Mascot: Trailblazers (formerly Redmen)
- Newspaper: The Red Line
- Website: khs.killinglyschools.org

Killingly High School is a public high school in Killingly, Connecticut. The school reported 792 students and 65 FTE classroom teachers for the 2014–2015 school year. Killingly High is the only public high school in the Killingly School District, which is on the eastern edge of Windham County. It also serves the nearby town of Brooklyn.

For 2015, the community voted to make the school the sole polling place in Killingly. The Secretary of State informed the town registrar's office that this was a misinterpretation of statute, and in 2016, a second polling place was opened at the school's old location.

Sports at the school are done as part of the Eastern Connecticut Conference.

Killingly High was included in a segment of the reality TV series The Principal's Office in 2009.

Old Killingly High School was built in 1908 and used by the school until 1965. The second building was then used until 2010 and continues to act as the site of an alternative learning program and the school district's central office. The first building was listed on the National Register of Historic Places in 1992 and is now the town's community center.

== Mascot controversies ==
In 2014 school officials began discussing changing the school's mascot name, The Redmen, in response to controversy over Native American mascots.

In 2019, another student group advocated for a name change and brought the issue back into the news. The school board voting to change the name to "Red Hawks", which was selected as the new mascot by 80% of students in an October, 2019 vote. An effort to restore the name Redmen was supported by the Native American Guardians Association (a controversial non-profit funded by the Washington Redskins Original Americans Foundation) which gave lectures on the origin of the name. On January 9, 2020, the board voted to reinstate the name "Redmen" with an updated logo to reduce negative stereotypes. The reinstatement drew national attention to the school. Connecticut State Speaker of the House Joe Aresimowicz called the reinstatement a "mockery of the process" and announced plans to ban the use of such mascots at the legislative level, following a precedent first set by Maine and followed by other states.

In 2022, the school and two others in the state were found to be out of compliance with state statutes due to the mascot and name, making Killingly High School ineligible to receive $94,000 in funding from Mashantucket Pequot Tribe and Mohegan funds.

In February 2024, the school board again formed a committee to review the name and mascot. In November, the committee voted to retire the Redmen name and mascot.

In the summer of 2025, after nearly a year of collaborative meetings and input from locals, alumni, staff, students, the local historical society, and other involved parties, the Board of Education voted to introduce the Trailblazers as the new name of the district's sports team.

== Athletics ==
=== CIAC State Championships ===
Team	Year
Football	1981, 1996, 2017, 2021
Golf	2016, 2018
Wrestling	2003, 2008, 2009, 2019, 2020, 2023, 2024
Gymnastics	1990, 2004, 2005, 2007, 2012

=== ECC Championships ===
Team	Year
Football	1966, 1980, 1981, 1995, 1996, 2009, 2015, 2016, 2017, 2018, 2021, 2022
Golf	1970, 1971, 1972, 1985, 1986, 1987, 1993, 2007, 2008, 2013, 2014, 2015, 2016, 2017, 2018, 2019, 2021, 2022, 2023
Wrestling	1995, 1996, 2001, 2002, 2003, 2018, 2019, 2020, 2022, 2024
Gymnastics	1988, 1989, 1990, 1991, 1992, 1994, 1995, 2004, 2005, 2007, 2008
Girls Tennis	2013, 2016, 2017, 2018

== Notable alumni ==
- Bruce Boisclair, New York Mets outfielder
- Shane Gibson, professional basketball player
- Eric Laakso, Miami Dolphins professional football player (NFL)

== See also ==
- List of secondary school sports team names and mascots derived from indigenous peoples
