= Jourdanton Independent School District =

School district in Texas, United States

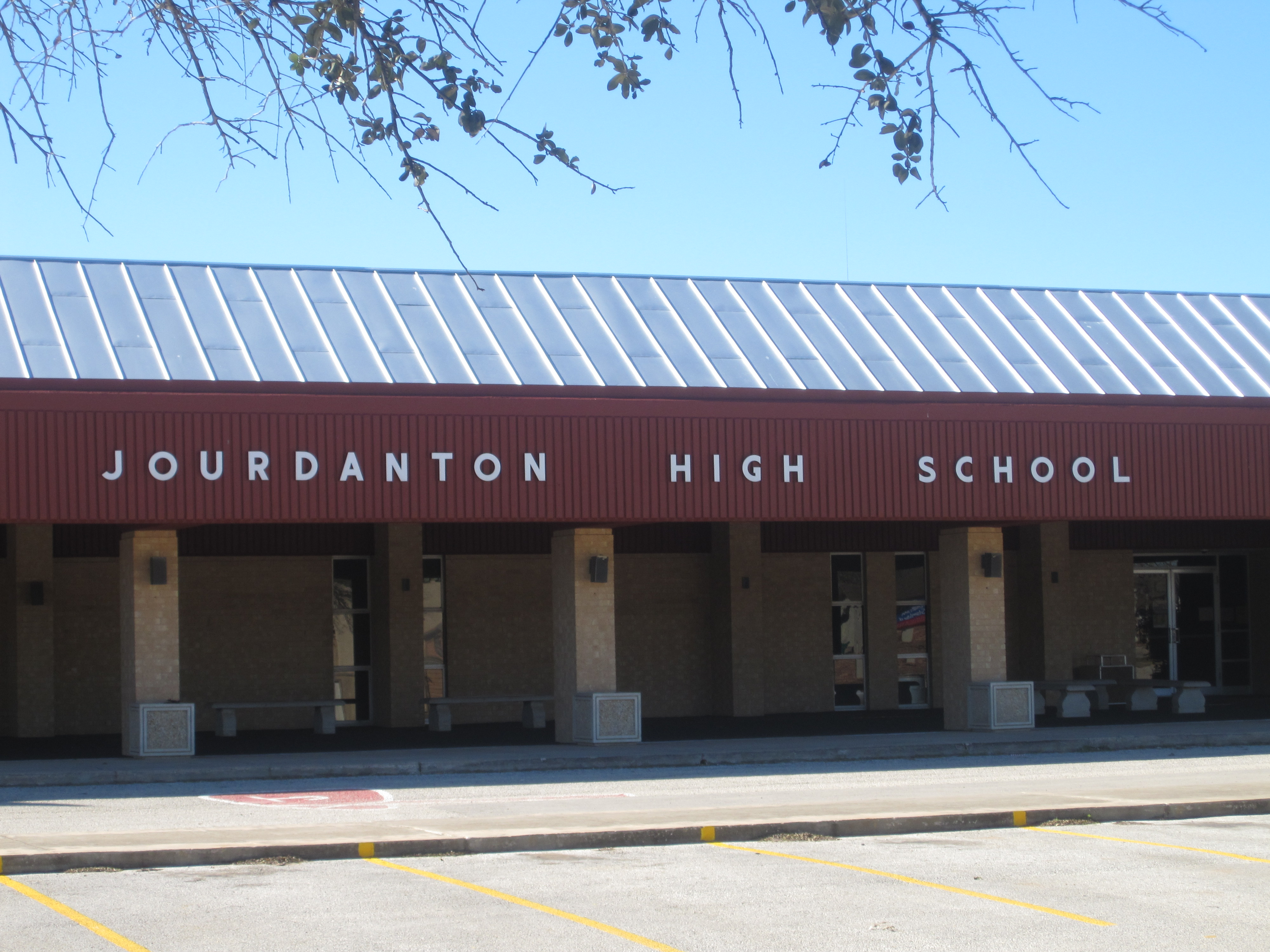
- Jourdanton High School

Location
- Jourdanton, Texas ESC Region 20 USA
- Coordinates: 28.9089°N 98.5397°W

District information
- Type: Public Independent school district
- Grades: EE through 12
- Superintendent: Dr. Tracy Canter
- Schools: 6 (2011-12)
- NCES District ID: 4824960

Students and staff
- Students: 1472 (2012-13)
- Teachers: 100.49 (2011-12) (on full-time equivalent (FTE) basis)
- Student–teacher ratio: 14.20 (2011-12)

Other information
- Website: Jourdanton ISD

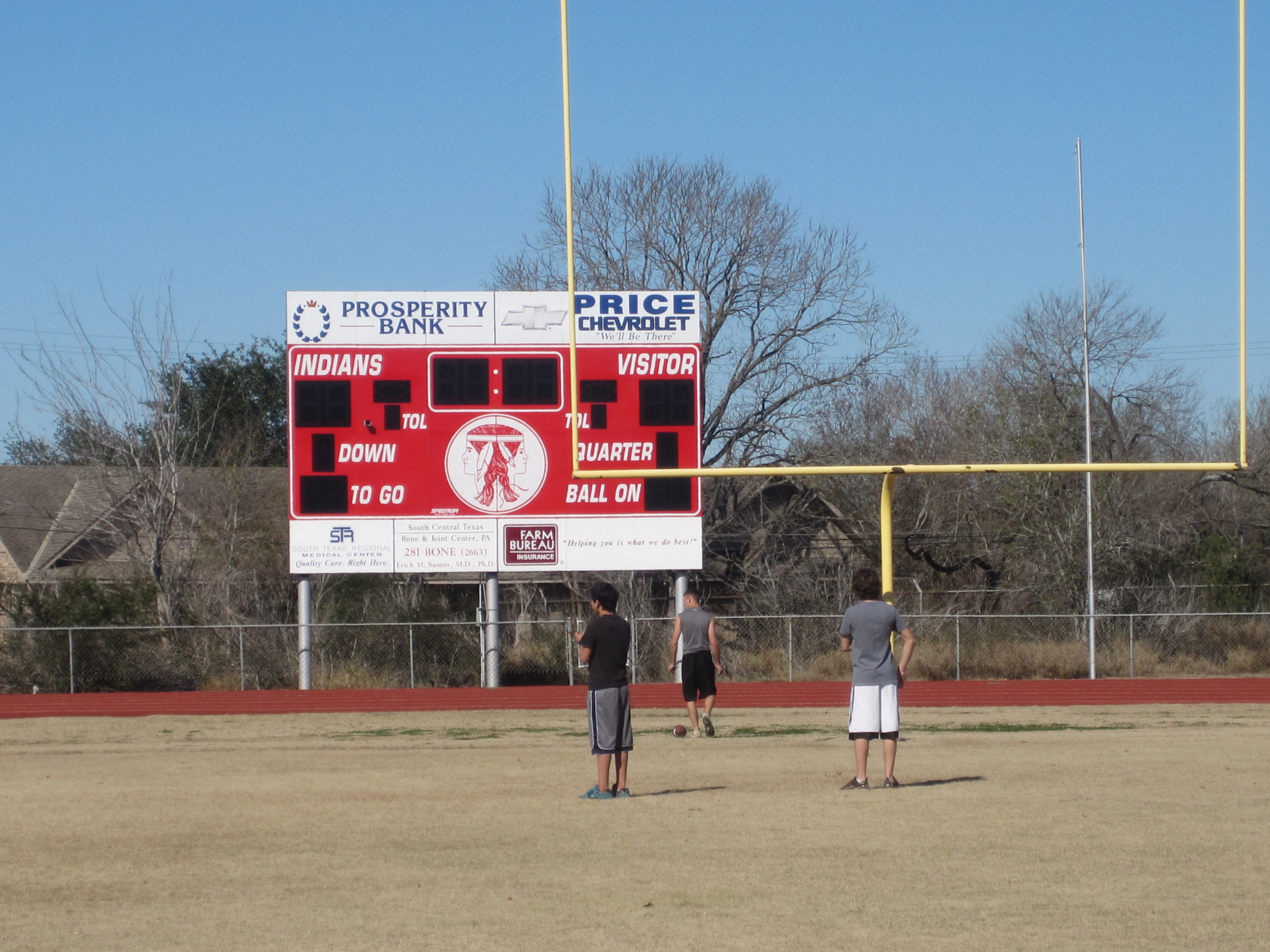
Students playing football inside Indian Stadium of Jourdanton High School on New Year's Day 2010

Jourdanton Independent School District is a public school district based in Jourdanton, Texas (USA).

In 2009, the school district was rated "academically acceptable" by the Texas Education Agency.

== Schools ==
In the 2022-2023 school year, the district had students in six schools.

High schools

- Jourdanton High School (Grades 9–12)

Middle schools

- Jourdanton Junior High (Grades 6–8)

Elementary schools

- Jourdanton Elementary (Grades 2-5)
- Jourdanton Early Childhood Center (Grades PK-1)

Alternative schools

- Atascosa County Alternative School (Grades 6–12)
- District Reassignment and Opportunity Center (Grades 6–12)
