= Avinger, Texas =

- Town
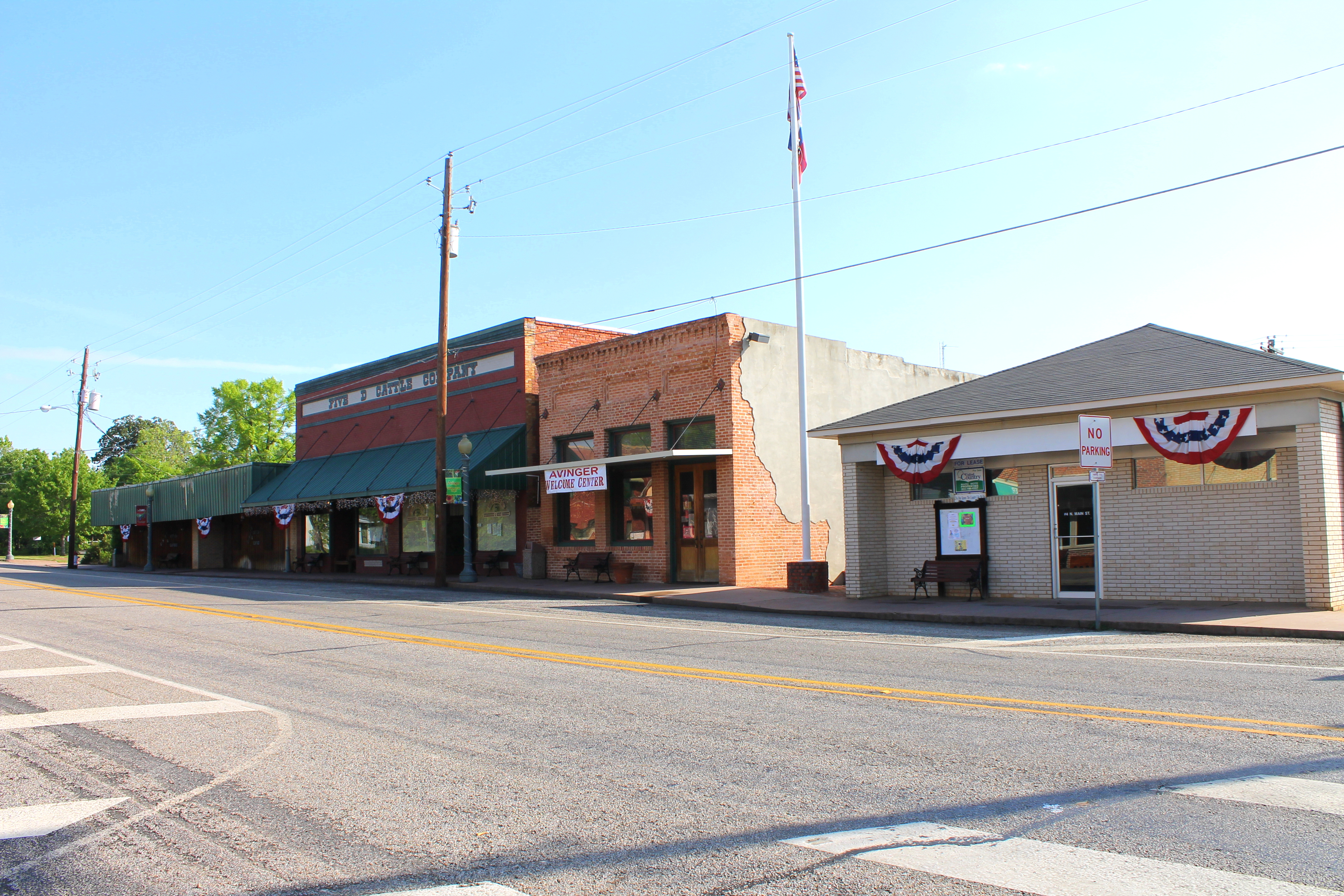
- Street in Avinger
- Nickname: A-Town
- Interactive map of Avinger, Texas
- Coordinates: 32°53′53″N 94°33′12″W
- Country: United States
- State: Texas
- County: Cass

Area
  - Total: 1.96 sq mi (5.07 km^{2})
  - Land: 1.95 sq mi (5.04 km^{2})
  - Water: 0.012 sq mi (0.03 km^{2})
- Elevation: 397 ft (121 m)

Population (2020)
  - Total: 371
  - Density: 191/sq mi (73.6/km^{2})
- Time zone: UTC-6 (Central (CST))
  - Summer (DST): UTC-5 (CDT)
- ZIP code: 75630
- Area codes: 903, 430
- FIPS code: 48-05084
- GNIS feature ID: 2411657

Avinger is a town in Cass County, in the U.S. state of Texas. The population was 444 at the 2010 census, and 371 at the 2020 U.S. census. State Representative David Simpson, a Republican from Longview, served from 1993 to 1998 as the mayor of Avinger.

== History ==
The town was established in 1876.

== Geography ==
Avinger is located in southwestern Cass County. Texas State Highway 49 passes through the town center, leading northwest 9 miles (14 km) to Hughes Springs and southeast 16 miles (26 km) to Jefferson. Texas State Highway 155 crosses Highway 49 southeast of the town center and leads northeast 14 miles (23 km) to Linden, the Cass County seat, and southwest 27 miles (43 km) to Gilmer.

According to the United States Census Bureau, Avinger has a total area of 2.0 square miles (5.1 km^{2}), of which 0.01 square miles (0.03 km^{2}), or 0.56%, is water.

== Demographics ==
Historical population
Census	Pop.	Note	%±
1880	63		—
1940	624		—
1950	546		−12.5%
1960	730		33.7%
1970	642		−12.1%
1980	671		4.5%
1990	478		−28.8%
2000	464		−2.9%
2010	444		−4.3%
2020	371		−16.4%
U.S. Decennial Census

Avinger racial composition as of 2020 (NH = Non-Hispanic) (Note: Note: the US Census treats Hispanic/Latino as an ethnic category. This table excludes Latinos from the racial categories and assigns them to a separate category. Hispanics/Latinos can be of any race.)
Race	Number	Percentage
White (NH)	276	74.39%
Black or African American (NH)	49	13.21%
Native American or Alaska Native (NH)	2	0.54%
Asian (NH)	2	0.54%
Some Other Race (NH)	2	0.54%
Mixed/Multi-Racial (NH)	17	4.58%
Hispanic or Latino	23	6.2%
Total	371	

As of the 2020 United States census, there were 371 people, 123 households, and 64 families residing in the town.

At the publication of the 2000 United States census, there were 464 people, 203 households, and 132 families residing in the town. The population density was 248.2 inhabitants per square mile (95.8/km^{2}). There were 236 housing units at an average density of 126.3 per square mile (48.8/km^{2}). The racial makeup of the town was 75.43% White, 22.63% African American, 0.43% from other races, and 1.51% from two or more races. Hispanic or Latino of any race were 1.94% of the population.

== Education ==
The town of Avinger is served by the Avinger Independent School District and is home to the Avinger High School Indians.
