= Cotter High School (Arkansas) =

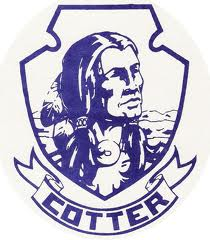

Location
- 198 Melba Ave; Cotter, Arkansas 72626; United States; 36°16′44″N 92°31′16″W

Information
- School type: Public Secondary
- School district: Cotter School District
- Superintendent: Vanessa Thomas Jones
- CEEB code: 040510
- NCES School ID: 050468000194
- Teaching staff: 65.36 (FTE)
- Grades: 7–12
- Gender: Co-educational
- Enrollment: 324 (2023-2024)
- Student to teacher ratio: 4.96
- Campus type: Rural
- Colors: Blue and white
- Fight song: WARRIOR FIGHT SONG
- Athletics conference: 2A 2 Conference
- Mascot: Warrior
- Team name: Cotter Warriors
- Yearbook: The Warrior
- Website: cotterschools.net

Cotter High School (CHS) is a comprehensive public junior-senior high school for students in grades 7 through 12 located in Cotter, Arkansas, United States. It is the sole high school of Cotter School District. The teacher-student ratio is approximately 10:1. Cotter High School serves the cities of Cotter and Gassville.

== History ==
Established in 1936–38, the community received funding from the Works Progress Administration to build the high school and its gymnasium. The original facilities continued to be used by the district until a fire destroyed the high school in 1973. The current high school building was completed in 1976.

=== Old Cotter High School Gymnasium ===
The Old Cotter High School Gymnasium, located at 412 Powell Street, is a 1936–38 structure built by Works Progress Administration. The gymnasium served students in the district until the new high school and its gymnasium was completed in 1980. In 1995, the structure was listed on the National Register of Historic Places. In recent years, the facility has served as the North Arkansas Youth Center.

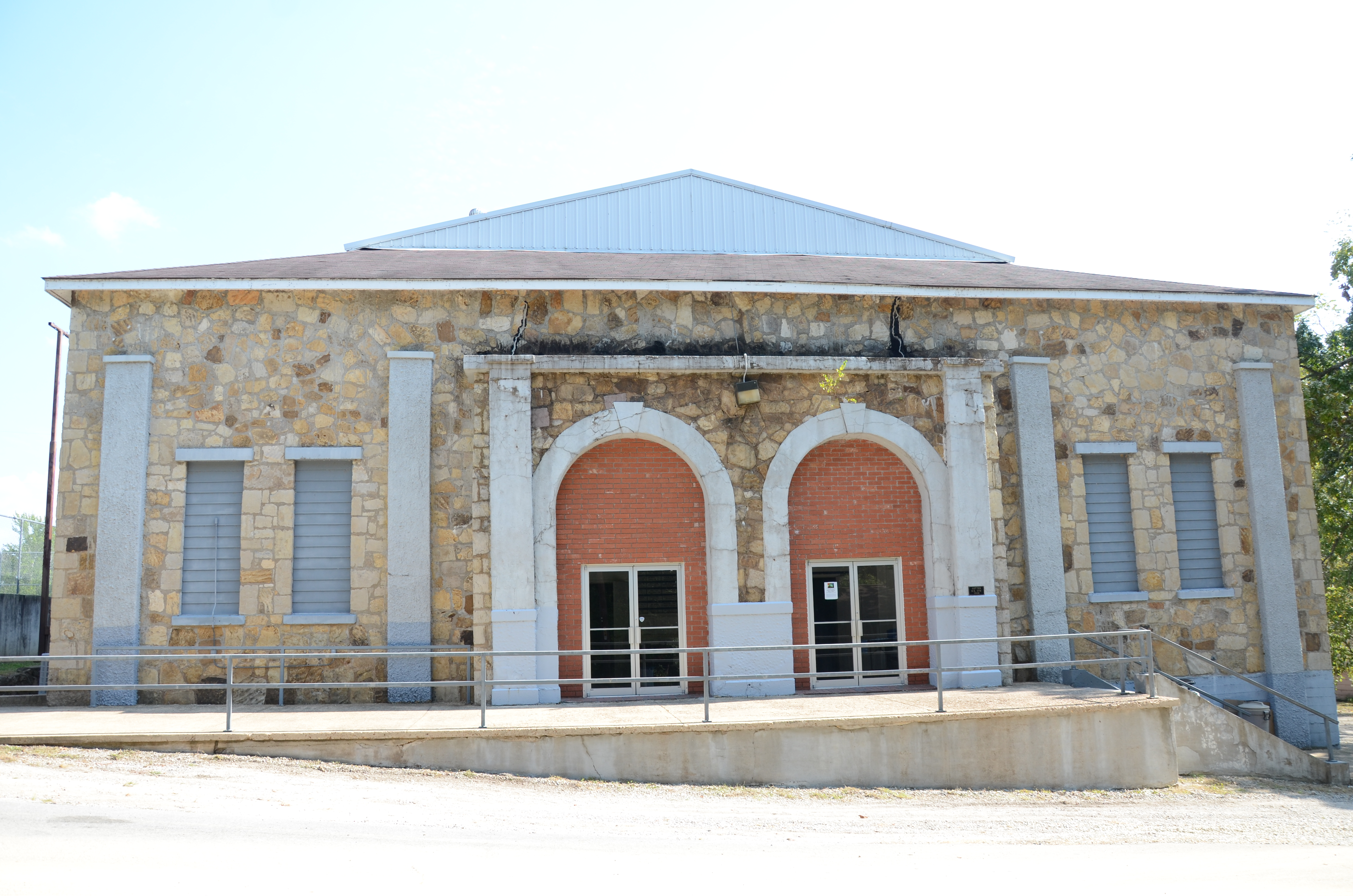
The Old Cotter High School Gym

== Curriculum ==
Courses follow the Smart Core curriculum developed by the Arkansas Department of Education (ADE), which requires students to complete 22 units prior to graduation. Students complete regular and Advanced Placement (AP) coursework and exams.

== Athletics ==
Warriors are Cotter High School's mascot and they call their mascot Ralph. Blue and white are the school colors. For 2012–14, Cotter Warriors compete in the 2A 2 Conference administered by the Arkansas Activities Association. The Warriors compete in interscholastic activities including baseball, basketball (boys/girls), cheer, cross country (boys/girls), softball, track & field (boys/girls), and volleyball.

== See also ==
- National Register of Historic Places listings in Baxter County, Arkansas
