= Conneaut Lake High School =

School in Conneaut Lake, Pennsylvania, US

Coordinates: 41.605872°N 80.323963°W

Conneaut Lake High School was part of the Conneaut School District located in Conneaut Lake, Pennsylvania.
