= Woodrow Wilson Junior College =

Woodrow Wilson Junior College may refer to:

- Woodrow Wilson Junior College (Philippines)
- The former name of Kennedy–King College, Chicago, United States
