= Jourdanton High School =

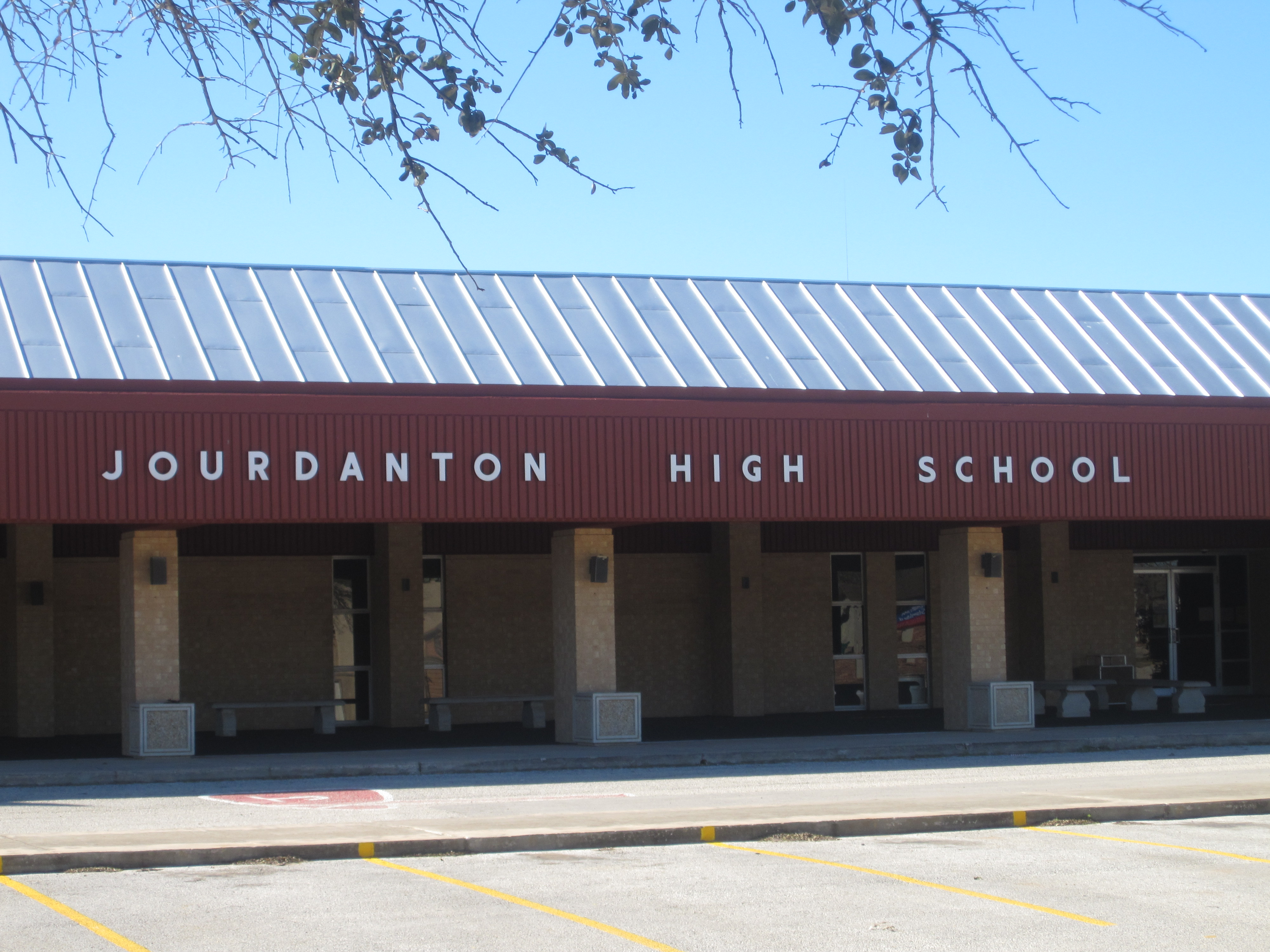

Location
- 200 Zanderson Avenue; Jourdanton, Atascosa County, Texas 78026-3045; United States; 28.9102°N 98.5414°W

Information
- School type: Public, high school
- Locale: Town: Distant
- School district: Jourdanton ISD
- NCES School ID: 482496002785
- Principal: Virginia Parsons
- Teaching staff: 38.27 (on an FTE basis)
- Grades: 9–12
- Enrollment: 471 (2024–2025)
- Student to teacher ratio: 12.31
- Colors: Red & White
- Athletics conference: UIL Class AAA
- Mascot: Indians/Squaws
- Yearbook: Chief
- Website: jourdantonisd.net

Jourdanton High School is a public high school located in Jourdanton, Texas, United States, and is classified as a 3A school by the University Interscholastic League. It is part of the Jourdanton Independent School District located in central Atascosa County. During 2022–2023, Jourdanton High School had an enrollment of 442 students and a student to teacher ratio of 11.06. The school received an overall rating of "C" from the Texas Education Agency for the 2024–2025 school year.

== Athletics ==
The Jourdanton Indians compete in these sports

- Baseball
- Basketball
- Cross Country
- Football
- Golf
- Marching Band
- Powerlifting
- Softball
- Tennis
- Track and Field
- Volleyball

=== State Titles ===
- Girls Basketball -
  - 1966(1A)
- Volleyball -
  - 1966(1A)

== Band ==
The Indian Band, nicknamed "The Pride of Atascosa County", is composed of around 130 JHS students as of October 2014.
