= Avinger High School =

Location
- 245 Connor Street; Avinger, Texas 75630-9501; United States; 32.9016°N 94.5610°W

Information
- School type: Public high school
- School district: Avinger Independent School District
- Principal: Eric Grogan
- Teaching staff: 17.43 (FTE)
- Grades: PK-12
- Enrollment: 117 (2023–2024)
- Student to teacher ratio: 6.71
- Colors: Maroon & White
- Athletics conference: UIL Class A
- Mascot: Indian/Lady Indian
- Yearbook: Indian
- Website: Avinger High School

Avinger High School or Avinger School is a public high school located in Avinger, Texas, United States, and classified as a 1A school by the UIL. It is part of the Avinger Independent School District located in southwest Cass County. For the 2021–2022 school year, the school was given a "B" by the Texas Education Agency.

== Athletics ==
The Avinger Indians compete in these sports -

- Baseball
- Basketball
- Cross Country
- Golf
- Tennis
- Track and Field

=== State titles ===
- Boys Basketball
  - 1977(1A), 1996(1A), 2016(1A)
- Boys Track-
  - 2006 Tyris Dowell
