= Wilson Junior High School =

- U.S. National Register of Historic Places
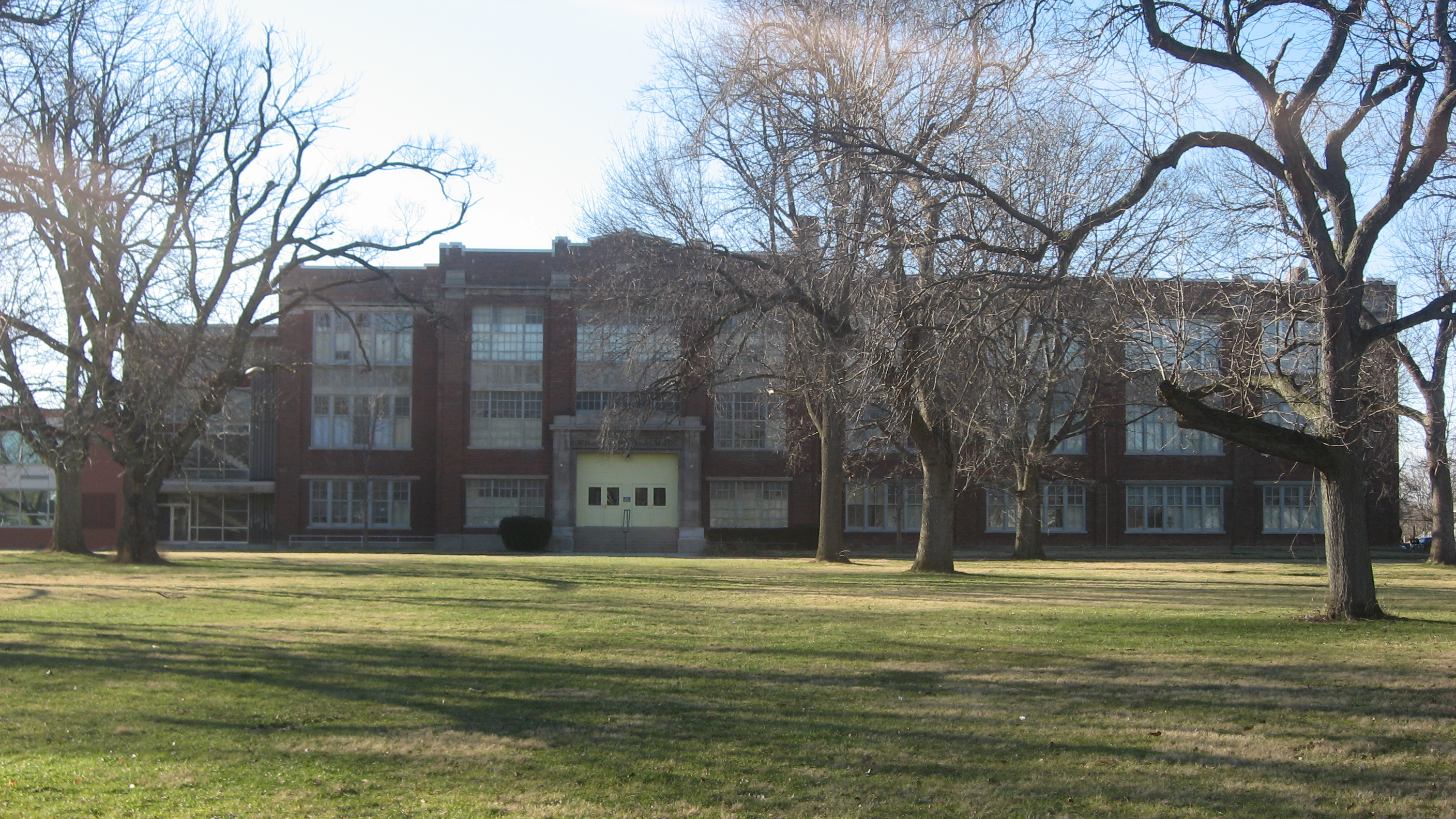
- Wilson Junior High School, January 2012

- Location within Indiana Location within the United States
- Location: 2000 S. Franklin St., Muncie, Indiana
- Coordinates: 40°10′36″N 85°23′20″W
- Area: 8.8 acres (3.6 ha)
- Built: 1921, 1927, 1954, 1964
- Architect: Kibele, Cuno; Garrard, Carl Wave
- Architectural style: Classical Revival
- MPS: Indiana's Public Common and High Schools MPS
- NRHP reference No.: 01000992
- Added to NRHP: September 16, 2001

Wilson Junior High School is a historic junior high school located at Muncie, Indiana, United States. It was built in 1921, and is a three-story, U-shaped, Classical Revival style brick veneer building with a flat roof. Additions were made to the original building in 1927, 1954, and 1964. The building features ornamental brickwork.

It was added to the National Register of Historic Places in 2001.
