= Randy Palmer =

American football player (born 1975)

No. 89
- Position: Tight end

Personal information
- Born: November 12, 1975 (age 50); Bexar County, Texas, U.S.
- Listed height: 6 ft 4 in (1.93 m)
- Listed weight: 235 lb (107 kg)

Career information
- High school: Pleasanton (Pleasanton, Texas)
- College: Texas A&M–Kingsville
- NFL draft: 1999: undrafted

Career history
- Oakland Raiders (1999)*; Cleveland Browns (1999); Oakland Raiders (2000)*; Tampa Bay Buccaneers (2000–2001)*; Scottish Claymores (2001)
- * Offseason or practice squad member only
- Stats at Pro Football Reference

Randy Gene Palmer (born November 12, 1975) is an American former professional football player who was a tight end for three games with the Cleveland Browns of the National Football League (NFL) in 1999. He played college football for the Texas A&M–Kingsville Javelinas.
