= Lyons House =

Lyons House may refer to:

in Australia

- Lyons House, a heritage listed house at 733 Port Hacking Rd, Dolans Bay, New South Wales.

in Ireland

- Lyons House, County Kildare, Ireland

in the United States (by state)

- Horace G. Lyons House, Berryton, Kansas, listed on the NRHP in Kansas
- Lyons House (Abbeville, Louisiana), listed on the NRHP in Louisiana
- Lyons House (Vinton, Louisiana), listed on the NRHP in Louisiana
- Benson H. Lyons House, Leesville, Louisiana, listed on the NRHP in Louisiana
- Joseph D. Lyons House, Sunderland, Maryland, listed on the NRHP in Maryland
- Byers-Lyons House, Pittsburgh, Pennsylvania, listed on the NRHP in Pennsylvania
- Frederick and Sallie Lyons House, Pleasanton, Texas, listed on the NRHP in Texas
- Oscar F. Lyons House, Peoa, Utah, listed on the NRHP in Utah
