= National Register of Historic Places listings in Atascosa County, Texas =

Location of Atascosa County in Texas

This is a list of the National Register of Historic Places listings in Atascosa County, Texas.

This is intended to be a complete list of properties listed on the National Register of Historic Places in Atascosa County, Texas. There are three properties listed on the National Register in the county. One property is also a State Antiquities Landmark.

This National Park Service list is complete through NPS recent listings posted March 21, 2025.

== Current listings ==
The locations of National Register properties may be seen in a mapping service provided.

	Name on the Register	Image	Date listed	Location	City or town	Description
1	Atascosa County Courthouse	Atascosa County Courthouse	December 30, 1997 (#97001598)	Circle Dr. 28°55′11″N 98°32′46″W	Jourdanton	State Antiquities Landmark; Mission Revival style completed in 1912
2	Korus Farmstead	Korus Farmstead	July 15, 1998 (#98000876)	US-281 at Farm-to-Market Rd. 536; 29°06′59″N 98°29′07″W	Leming	
3	Frederick and Sallie Lyons House	Frederick and Sallie Lyons House	February 20, 2001 (#01000061)	801 Live Oak St. 28°58′00″N 98°29′13″W	Pleasanton	Modified L-plan building constructed between 1912 and 1913.

== See also ==
- National Register of Historic Places listings in Texas
- Recorded Texas Historic Landmarks in Atascosa County
