= Atascosa County Courthouse =

- U.S. National Register of Historic Places
- Texas State Antiquities Landmark
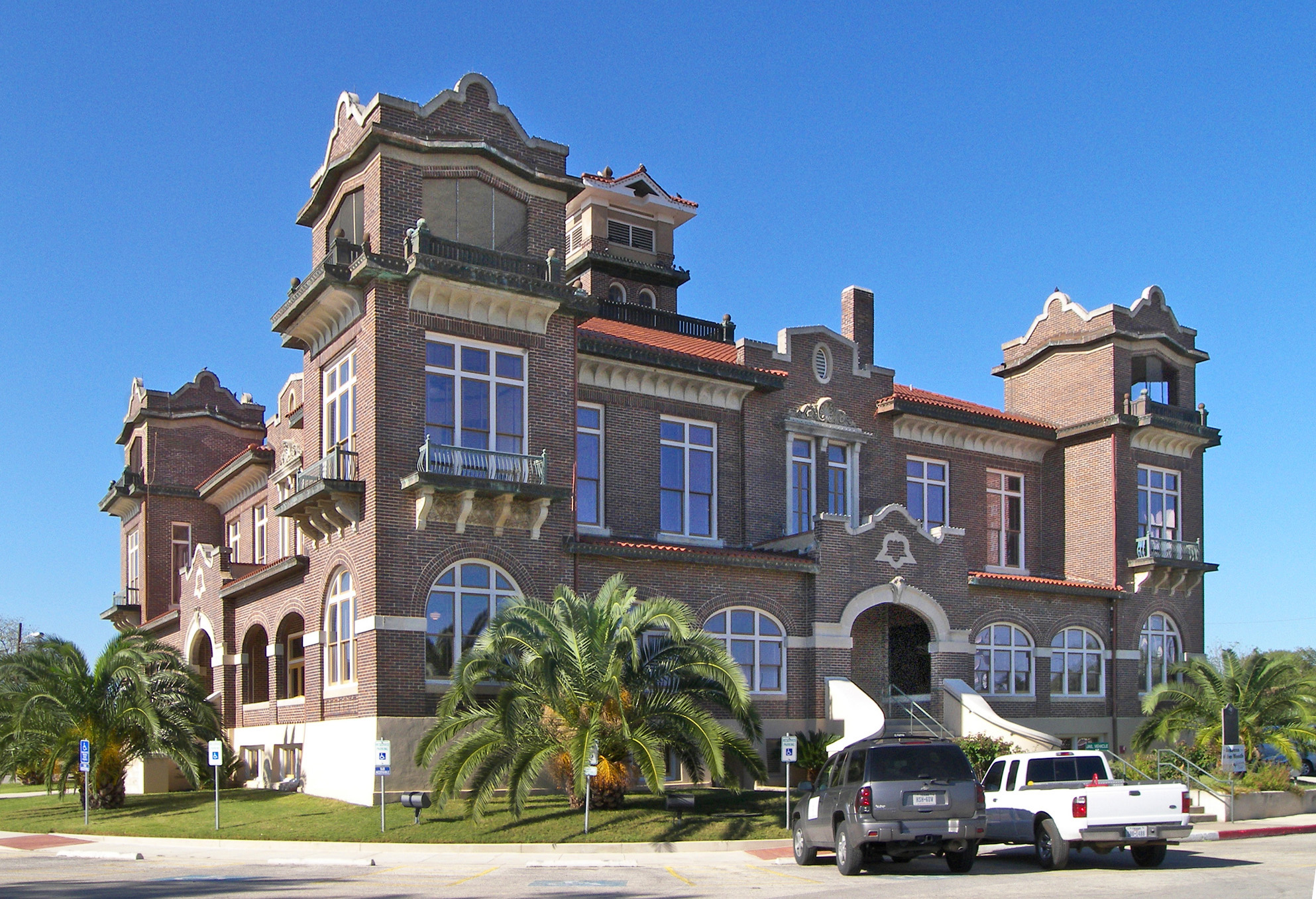
- Atascosa County Courthouse in 2008.

- Location within Texas Location within the United States
- Interactive map showing the location for Atascosa County Courthouse
- Location: Circle Dr, Jourdanton, Texas
- Coordinates: 28°55′10″N 98°32′45″W
- Area: 1 acre (0.40 ha)
- Built: 1912
- Built by: Gordon Jones Construction Co.
- Architect: Henry T. Phelps
- Architectural style: Mission/Spanish Revival
- NRHP reference No.: 97001598
- TSAL No.: 8200000734

Significant dates
- Added to NRHP: December 30, 1997
- Designated TSAL: January 1, 2000

The Atascosa County Courthouse is a historic courthouse built in 1912 on Circle Dr in Jourdanton, Texas. The Mission Revival Style architecture building was designed by San Antonio architect Henry T. Phelps. The building contract was awarded to the Gordon Jones Construction Co. of San Antonio, based on a bid of $65,000. It was added to the National Register of Historic Places on December 30, 1997. Atascosa County was formed in 1856. The first Atascosa County Courthouse was a log building erected in Amphion in 1856. The second a frame building raised in Pleasanton in 1857. The county built a larger frame courthouse in 1868. The fourth courthouse, built in 1885 was made from red stone and served as the Pleasanton City Hall when the county seat was moved to Jourdanton.

The current Atascosa County Courthouse is the fifth structure to serve as the seat of Atascosa County government. The Mission Revival style courthouse has towers, balconies and a Spanish-tiled roof. It is finished in red-brown brick and cast stone. Originally, the lower floor was open for the storage of wood. It was enclosed in the late 1920s to create more office space. The courthouse sits on a circular plot of land in contrast to the typical Texas courthouse square. The Atascosa County Courthouse is the only existing Mission Revival style courthouse in Texas.

== See also ==
- National Register of Historic Places listings in Atascosa County, Texas
- List of county courthouses in Texas

== Bibliography ==
- Kelsey, Mavis P, Sr.; Dyal, Donald H. (1993). The Courthouses of Texas. College Station, TX: Texas A&M University Press. ISBN 0-89096-546-3.
