= Pleasanton Independent School District =

School district in Texas, United States

Coordinates: 37.6554°N 121.8763°W

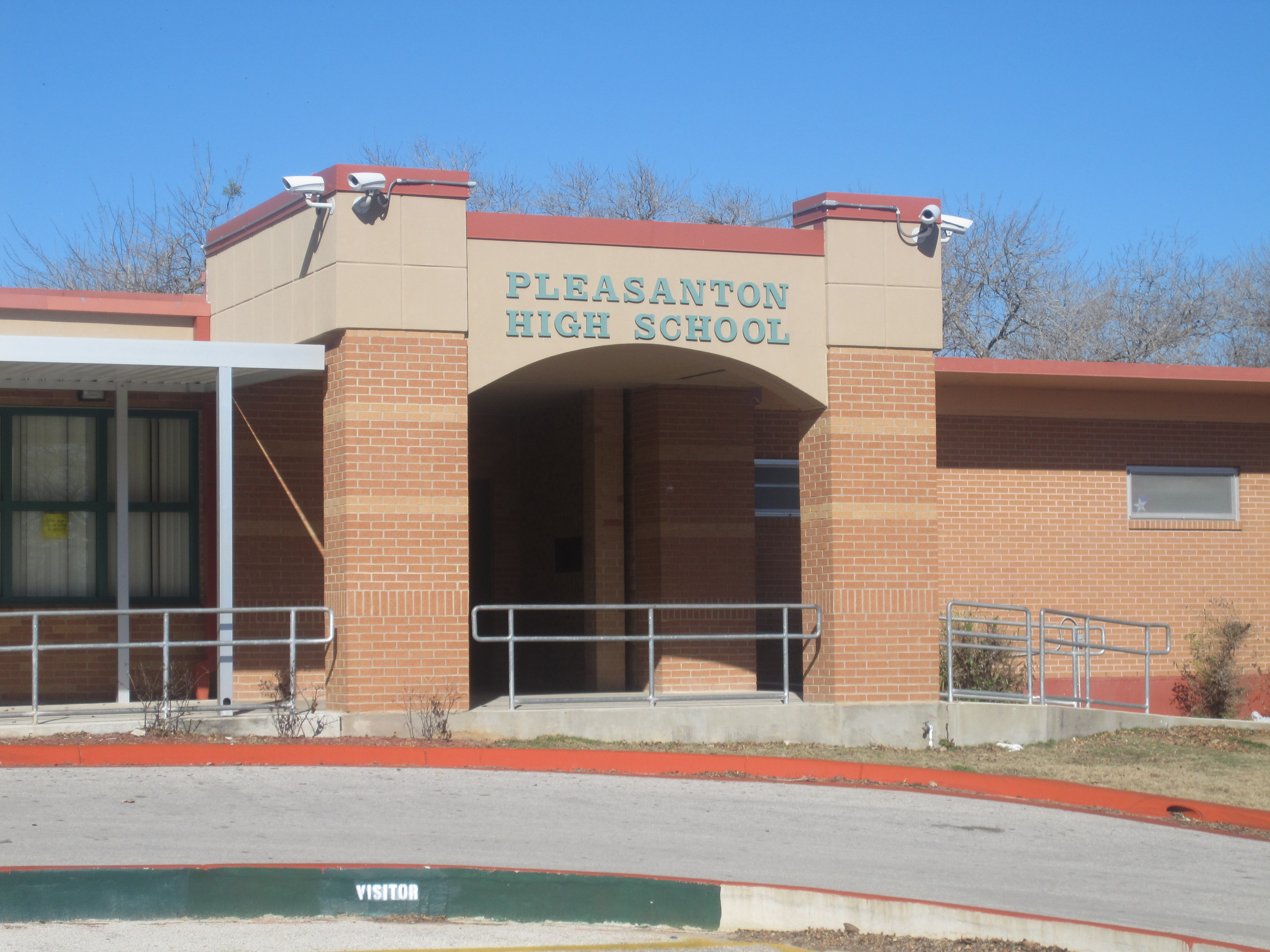
- Pleasanton High School

Location
- Pleasanton, Texas ESC Region 20 USA

District information
- Type: Public Independent school district
- Grades: EE through 12
- Superintendent: Matthew Mann
- Schools: 9 (2011-12)
- NCES District ID: 4835190

Students and staff
- Students: 3,384 (2022-23)
- Teachers: 242.49 (2011-12) (on full-time equivalent (FTE) basis)
- Student–teacher ratio: 14.17 (2011-12)

Other information
- Website: Pleasanton ISD

Pleasanton Independent School District is a public school district based in Pleasanton, Texas (USA).

In 2011, the School District was rated "Academically Acceptable" by the Texas Education Agency.

The ratings varied greatly from campus to campus with the Primary, Elementary and Intermediate campuses receiving a rating of Recognized, the Junior High received a rating of Academically Acceptable while the High School and the School of Choice were rated as Academically Unacceptable.

In 2022, the total expenditure per student was $11,234

== Schools ==
In the 2017–2018 school year, the district had students in seven schools.

High schools

- Pleasanton High School (Grades 9–12)

Middle schools

- Pleasanton Junior High (Grades 6–8)

Elementary schools

- Pleasanton Elementary (Grades 2–5)
- Pleasanton Primary (Grades EE-2)

Alternative schools

- Pleasanton ISD School of Choice (Grades 9–12)
- Atascosa County Alternative School (Grades 5–12)
- Pleasanton ISD Reassignment and Opportunity Center (Grades 6–12)
