= Henry T. Phelps =

American architect (1871–1944)

Henry Truman Phelps (August 25, 1871 – December 4, 1944) was an American architect responsible for the design of many Texas county courthouses and other public and commercial buildings in San Antonio and around the state.

Phelps was born in Anaqua, Texas, to Edwin McNamee and Mary Jane (née Bickford) Phelps. He began working as a draftsman in various architectural offices in San Antonio by the time he was 20. He briefly served in the Spanish–American War. From 1902 to 1909, Phelps opened several architectural firms both by himself and partnering with others. He firmly established himself in a solo practice between 1910 and 1940.

Phelps designed buildings in several architectural styles, such as Romanesque Revival, Mission Revival, Beaus-Arts, and Streamline Moderne.

Phelps married Laura Clamp in San Antonio in 1905, and the couple had two children. He died of a heart attack in San Antonio.

== Gallery ==
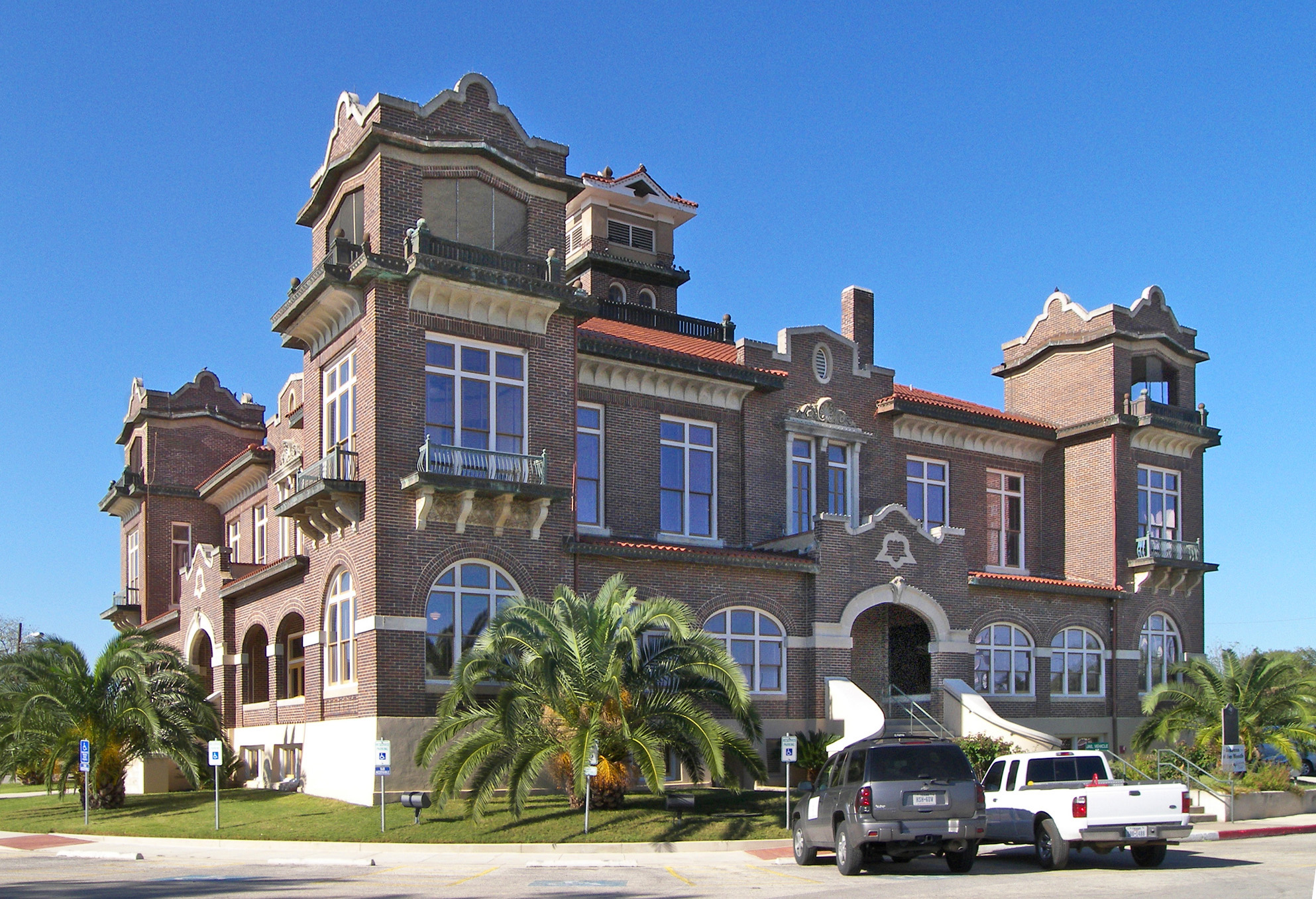
Atascosa County Courthouse (1912)

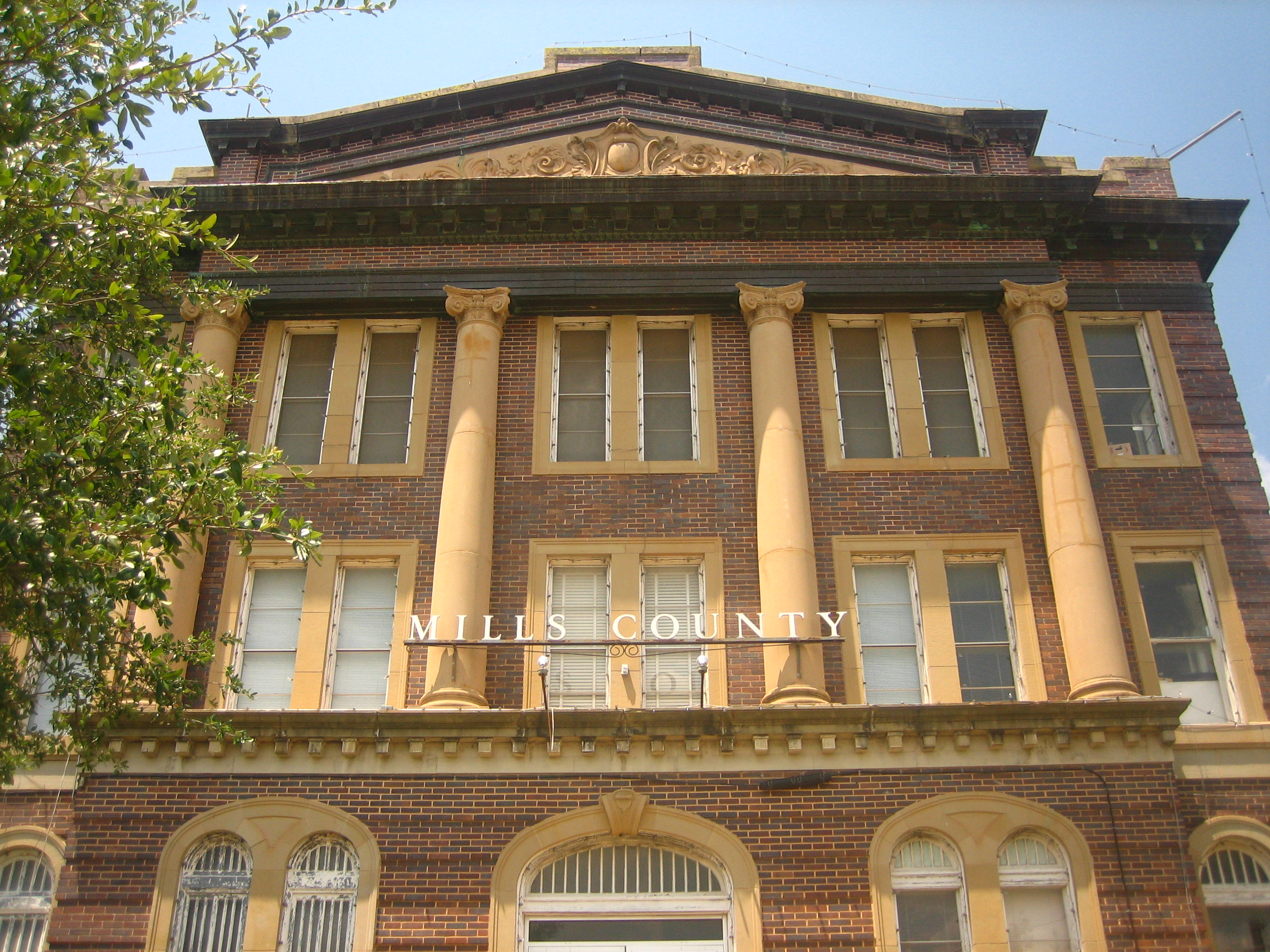
Mills County Courthouse (1913)

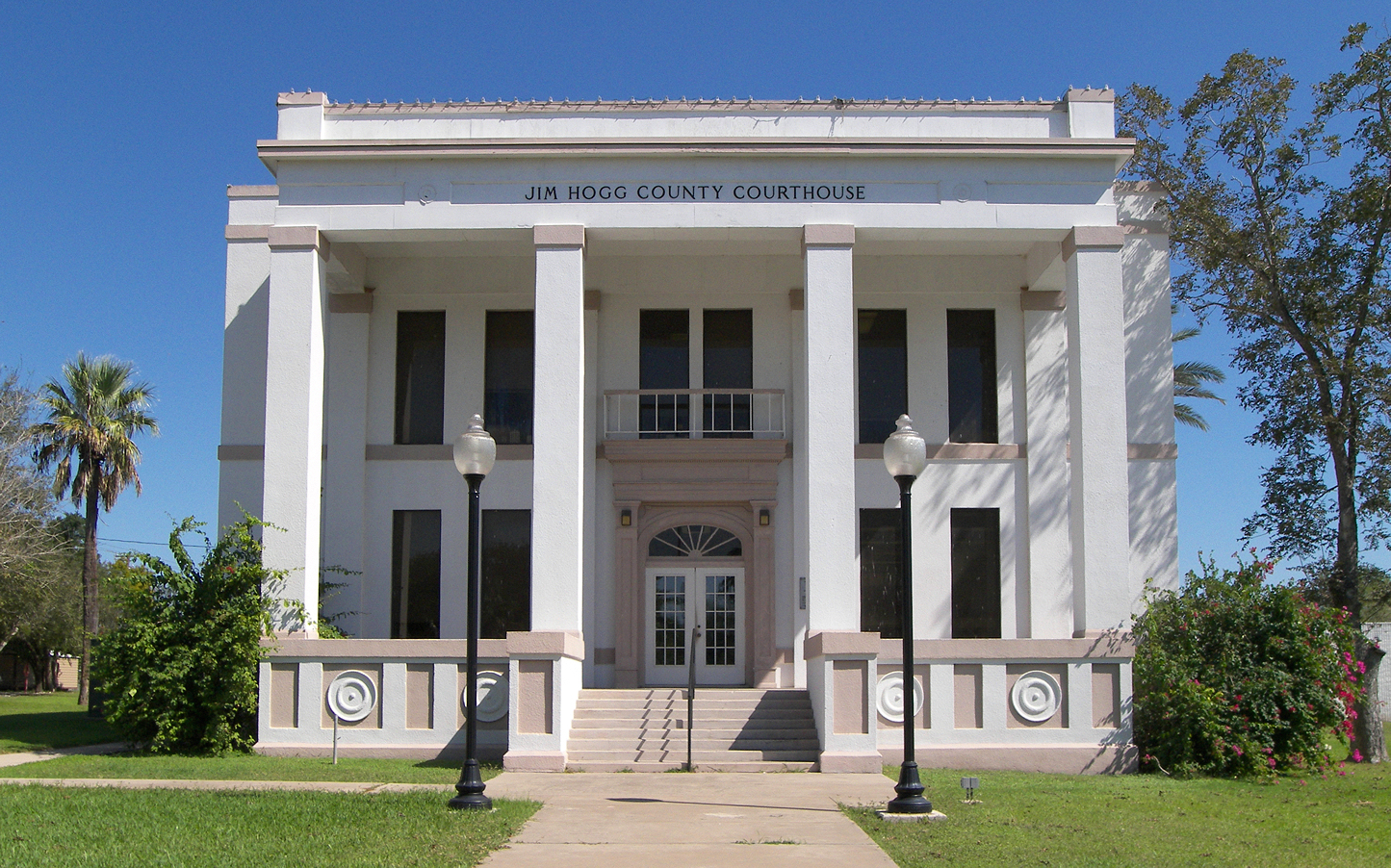
Jim Hogg County, Texas Courthouse (1913)

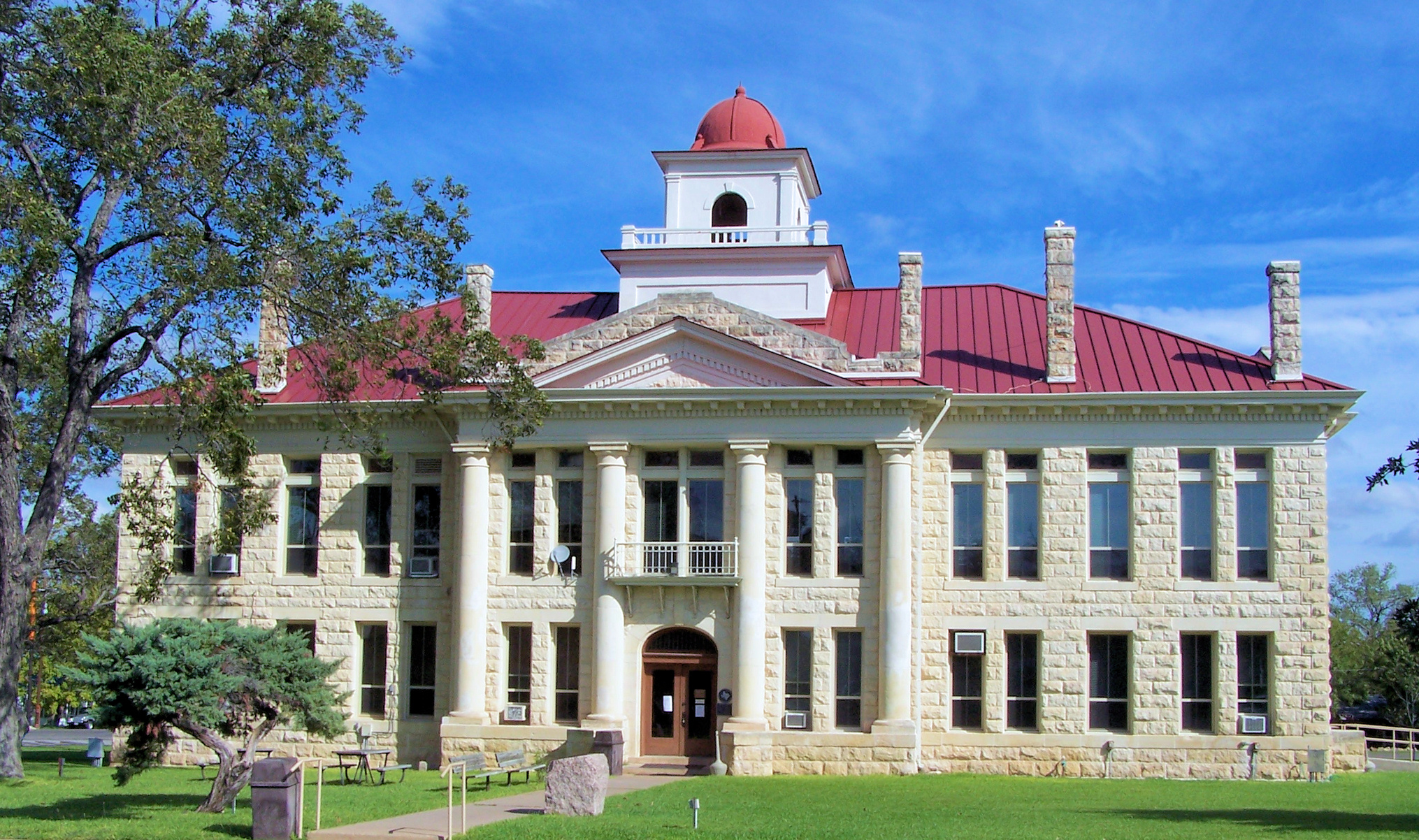
Blanco County Courthouse, Johnson City, Texas (1916)

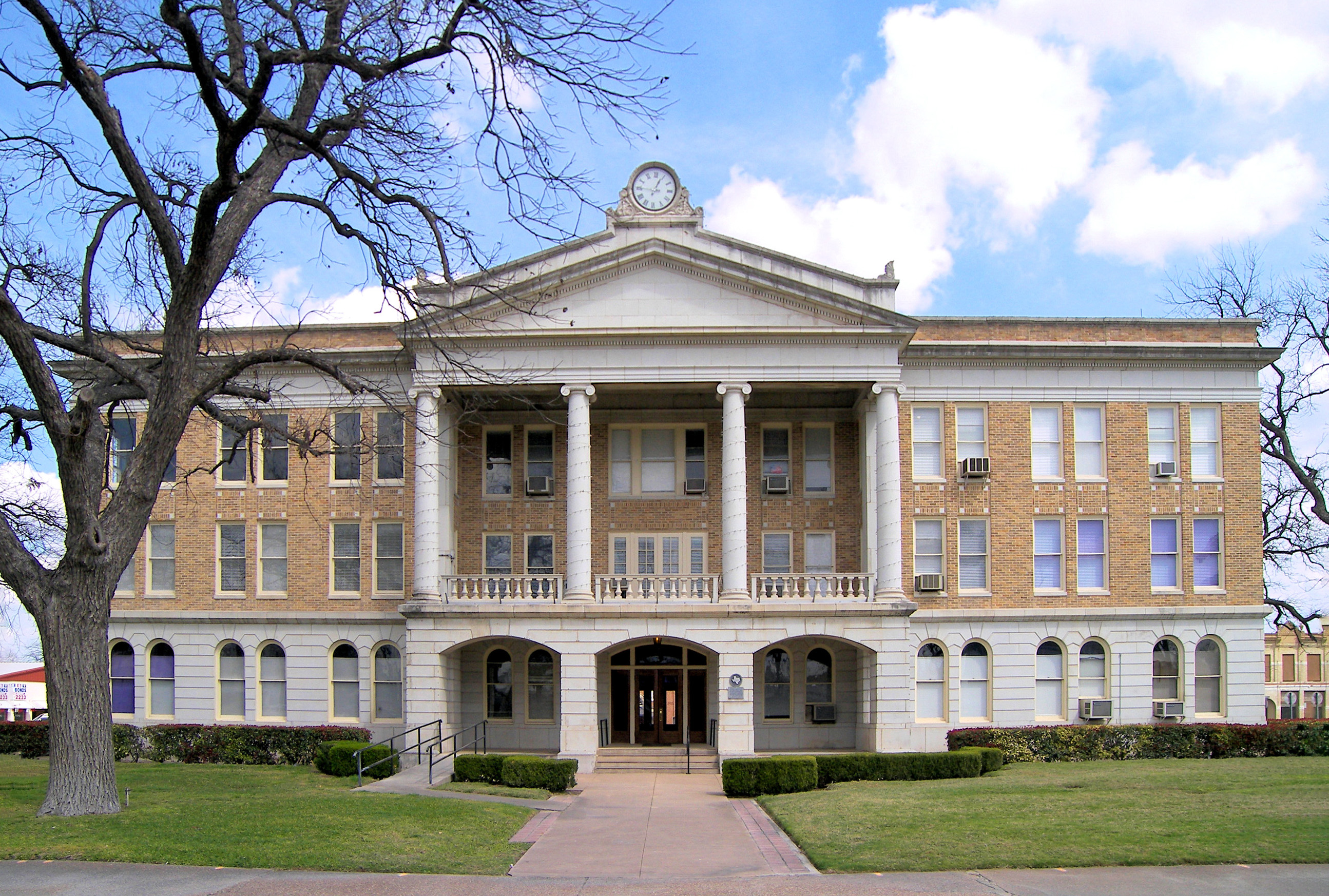
Uvalde County, Texas Courthouse (1927)

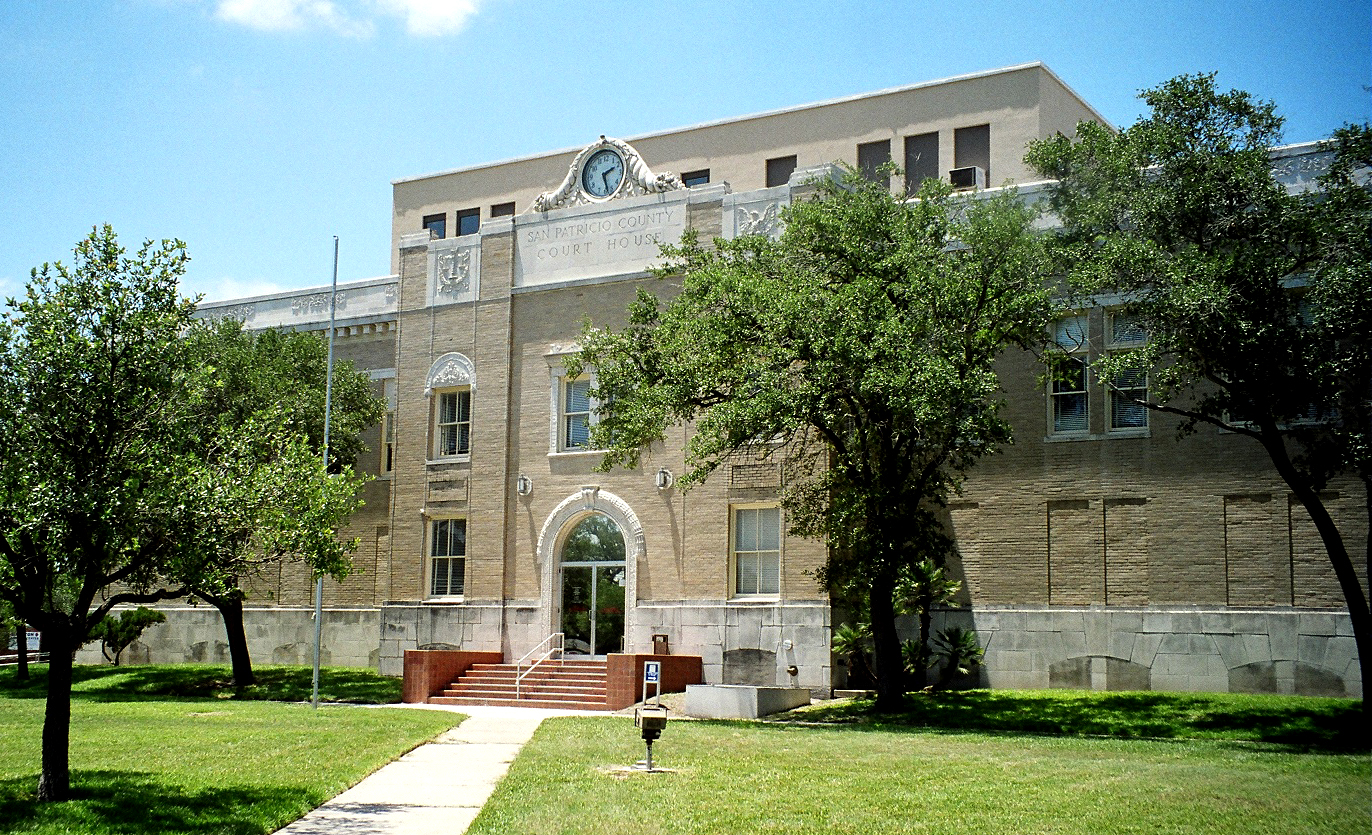
San Patricio County, Texas Courthouse (1928)

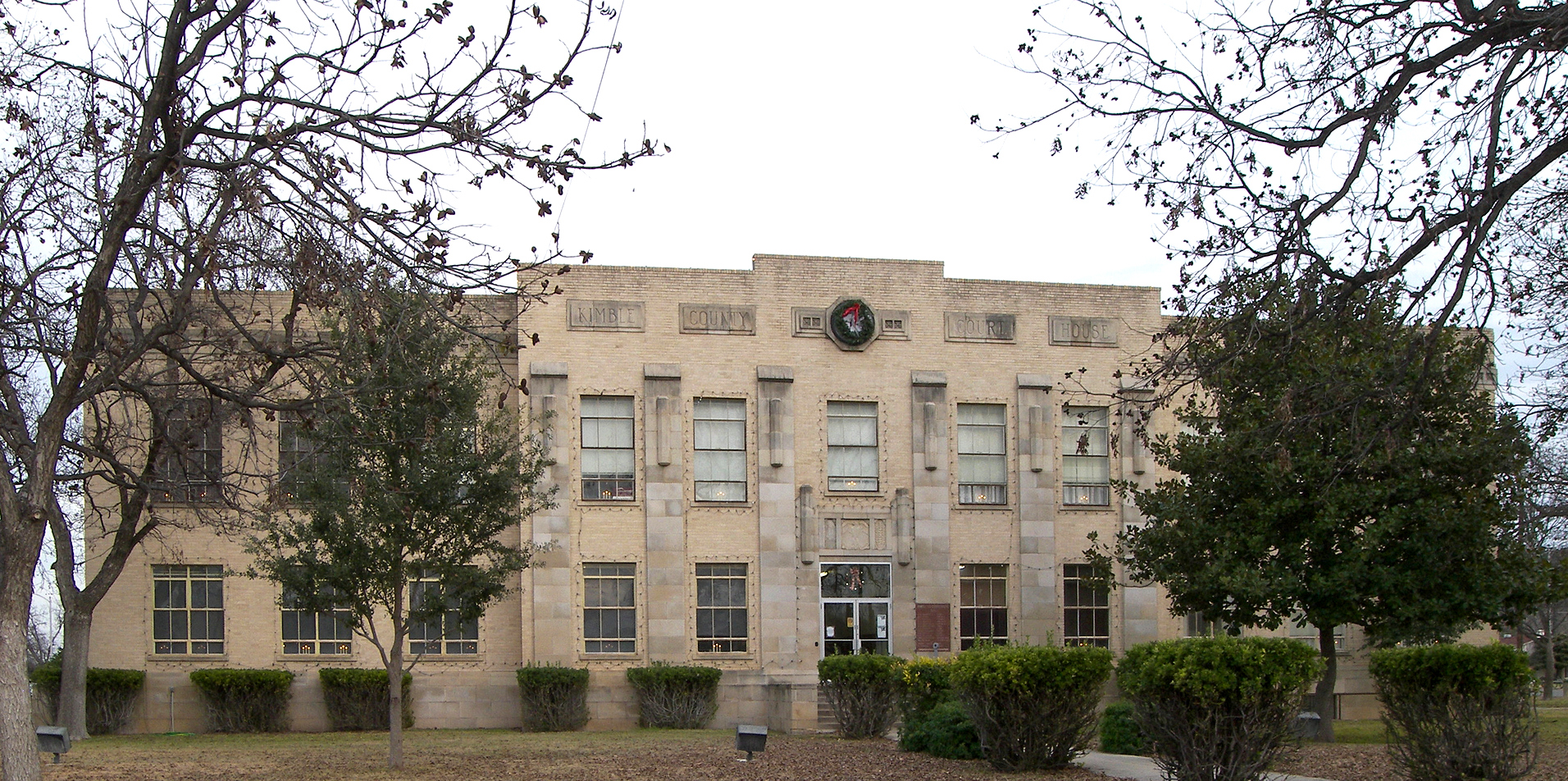
Kimble County, Texas (1929)

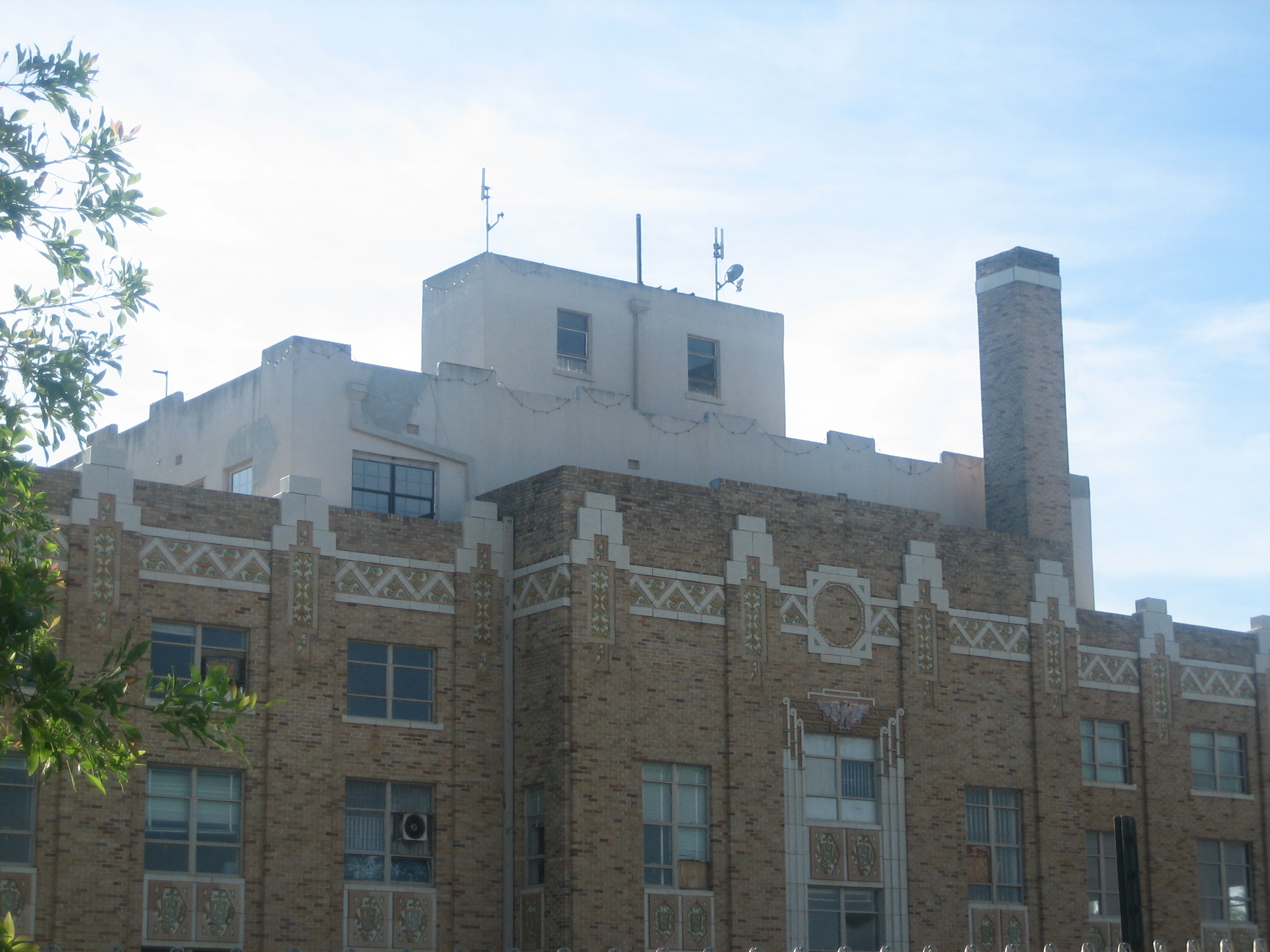
La Salle County, Texas Courthouse (1931)
