= Oscar F. Lyons House =

- U.S. National Register of Historic Places
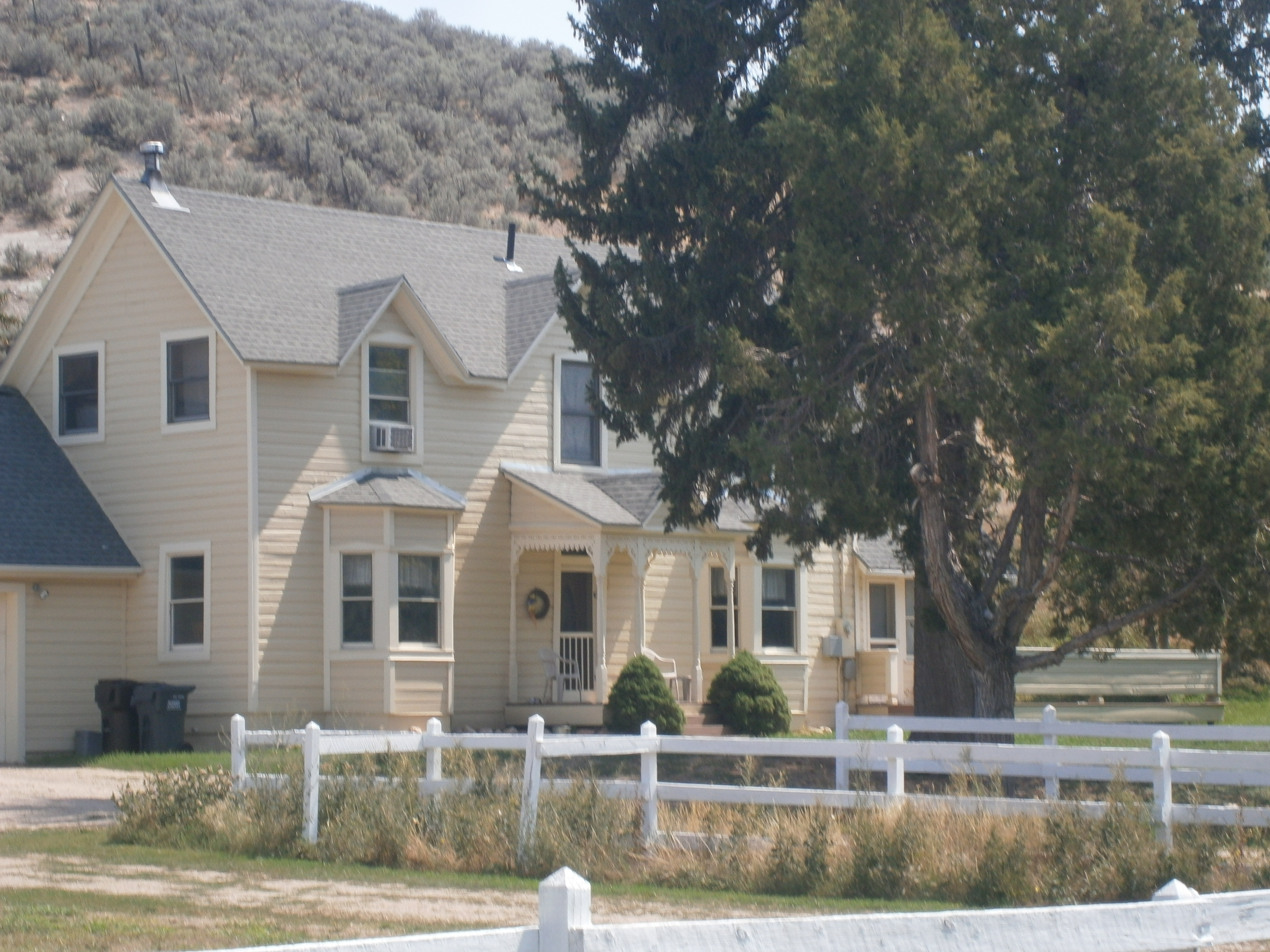

- Location within Utah Location within the United States
- Location: Woodenshoe Rd., Peoa, Utah
- Coordinates: 40°43′24″N 111°20′25″W
- Area: 2 acres (0.81 ha)
- Built: c.1875-1880
- NRHP reference No.: 83003192
- Added to NRHP: July 14, 1983

The Oscar F. Lyons House, on Woodenshoe Rd. in Peoa, Utah, was built around 1875–1880. It was listed on the National Register of Historic Places in 1983.

It is a two-story house which was deemed "a good example of late nineteenth century vernacular architecture in Utah." It was built with "horizontal plank-on-plank wall construction and covered with ship-lap or novelty siding. The house has a common rafter gabled roof and brick gable-end stove chimneys. The symmetrical three-bay facade is characteristic of the central-passage I house vernacular type. Principal decorative features include Gothic wall dormers over the second story facade windows, a gabled portico supported by turned and bracketed posts, and projecting bay windows on the facade at the ground level."

It was originally not painted, but was painted white around 1980. Despite some modifications, it was deemed to be in "excellent original condition."

The house was built by or for Oscar Fitzallen Lyons and his wife Maria. Lyons (1838–1908) was born in Ireland and came to Utah with his parents in 1849. Through the 1860s Peoa was a small settlement consisting of a fort built of single-room log cabins, and was abandoned for a time in 1867-68 due to hostilities with Indians. In 1869 Oscar married Maria L. Marchant, daughter of the leading citizen of Peoa, Abraham Marchant. After the town became more settled, they built the house. Lyons was a farmer, stockraiser, and postmaster.

It was later owned by Reuben Jensen, the "Federal trapper" for the area.
