= Frederick and Sallie Lyons House =

- U.S. National Register of Historic Places
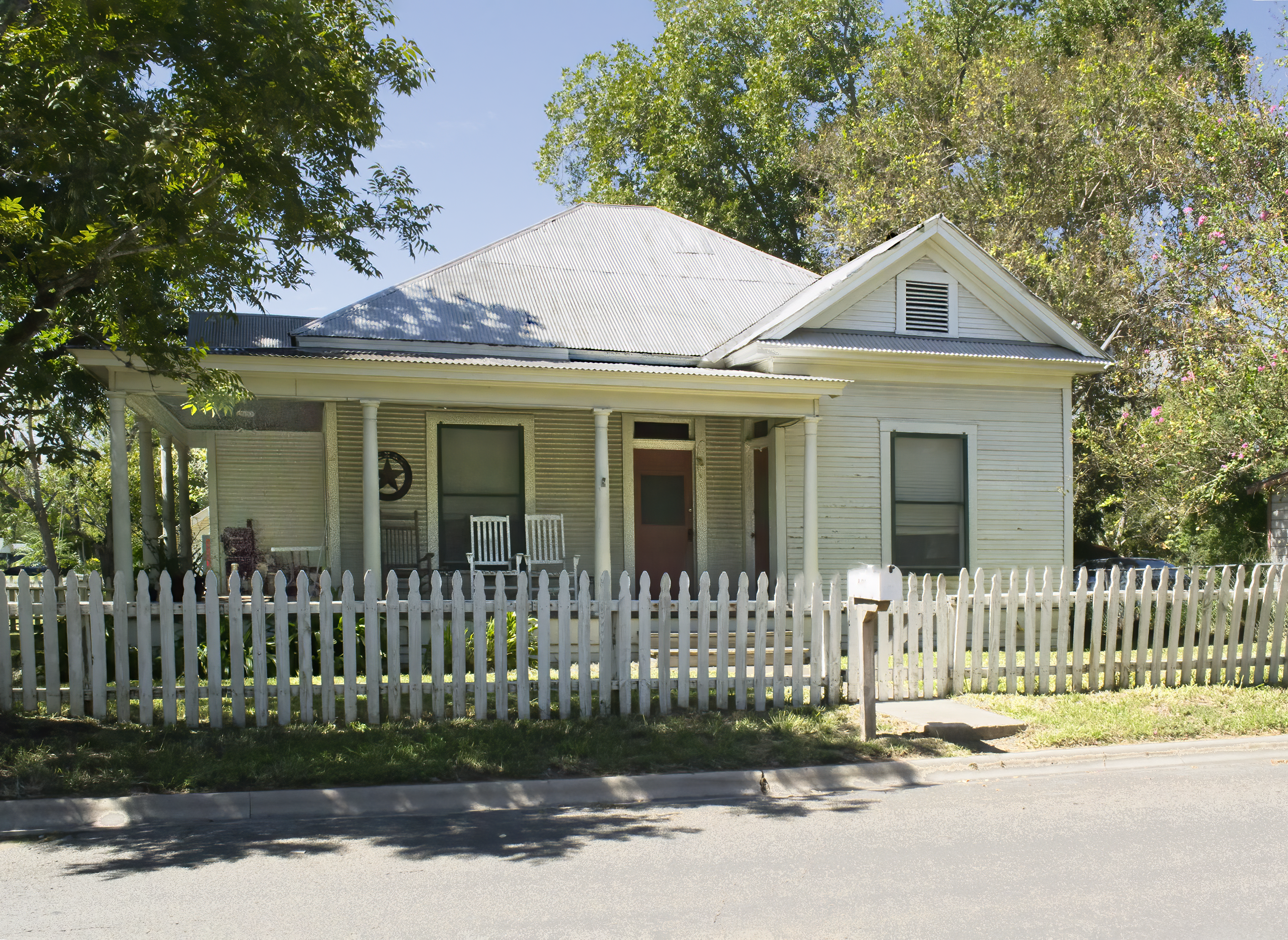

- Location within Texas Location within the United States
- Location: 801 Live Oak St., Pleasanton, Texas
- Coordinates: 28°58′00″N 98°29′13″W
- Area: less than one acre
- Built: 1912-13
- NRHP reference No.: 01000061
- Added to NRHP: February 20, 2001

The Frederick and Sallie Lyons House, at 801 Live Oak St. in Pleasanton, Texas, was listed on the National Register of Historic Places in 2001.

It is a modified L-plan building constructed between 1912 and 1913.
