= Pleasanton High School (Pleasanton, Texas) =

Public school in Texas, United States

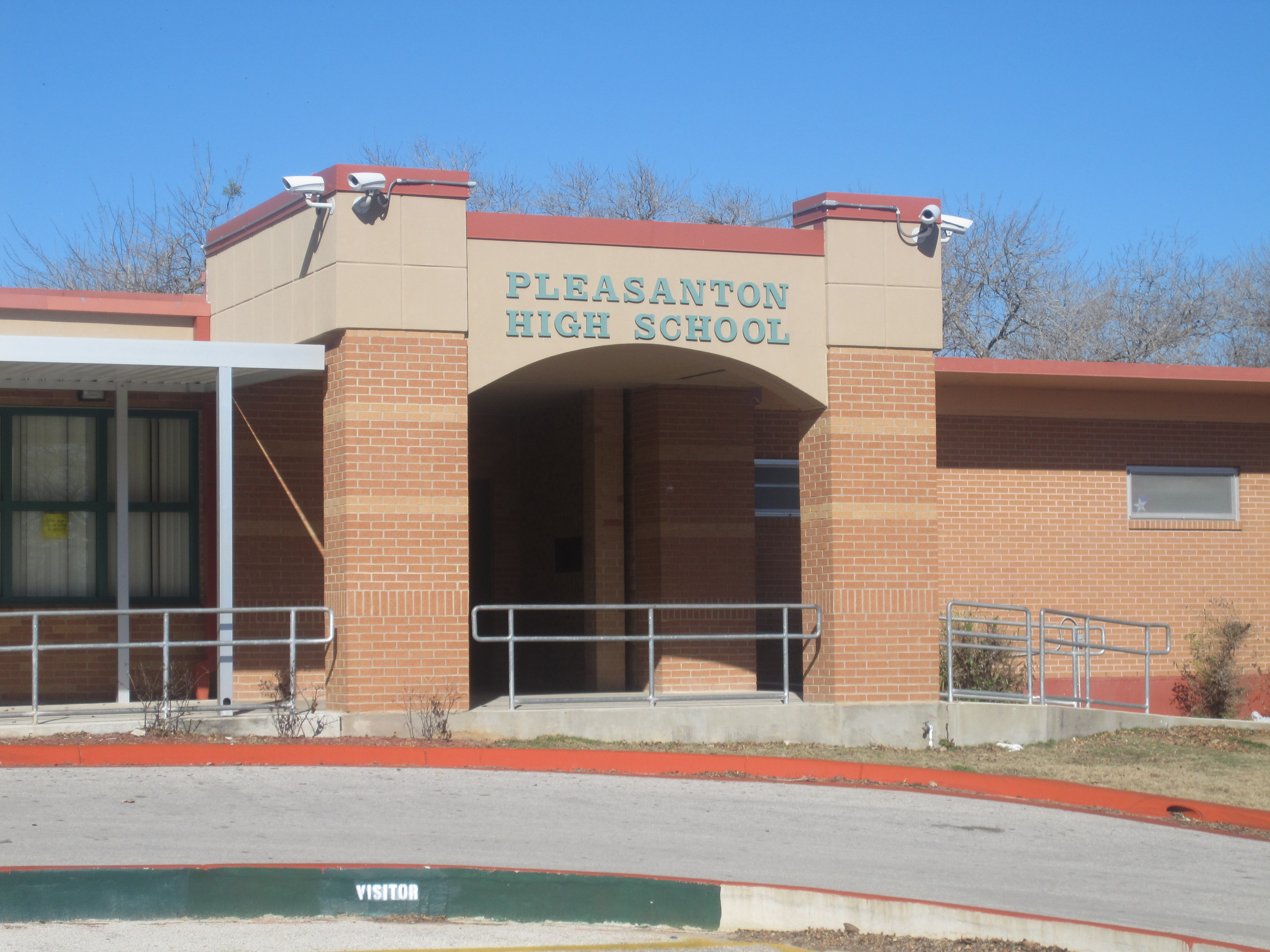
- Front entrance

Location
- 900 West Adams Street; Pleasanton, Atascosa County, Texas 78064-3708; United States; 28.96529°N 98.4932°W

Information
- School type: Public, high school
- Locale: Town: Distant
- School district: Pleasanton ISD
- NCES District ID: 4835190
- Superintendent: Matthew Mann
- NCES School ID: 483519003984
- Principal: Twila Guajardo
- Staff: 73.75 (on an FTE basis)
- Grades: 9–12
- Enrollment: 980 (2023–2024)
- Student to teacher ratio: 13.29
- Colors: Kelly green and white
- Athletics conference: UIL Class AAAA
- Mascot: Eagle/Lady Eagle
- Website: www.pisd.us/o/highschool

Pleasanton High School is a public high school located in Pleasanton, Texas (USA) and classified as a 4A school by the UIL. It is part of the Pleasanton Independent School District located in central Atascosa County. During 2022–2023, Pleasanton High School had an enrollment of 944 students and a student-to-teacher ratio of 12.76. The school received an overall rating of "B" from the Texas Education Agency for the 2024–2025 school year.

== Academic Departments ==
The high school offers the following Academic Departments

- Aerie Lab
- Agriculture
- Art
- Athletics
- Band
- Business
- Choir
- CTE
- Culinary
- English Language Art
- Health Careers
- Lifeskills
- Math
- Physical Education
- Science
- Social Studies
- Special Education
- Theatre Arts

== Athletics ==
The Pleasanton Eagles compete in the following sports

- Baseball
- Basketball
- Cross Country
- Football
- Golf
- Powerlifting
- Soccer
- Softball
- Tennis
- Track and Field
- Volleyball
