= Pleasanton, Texas =

- City
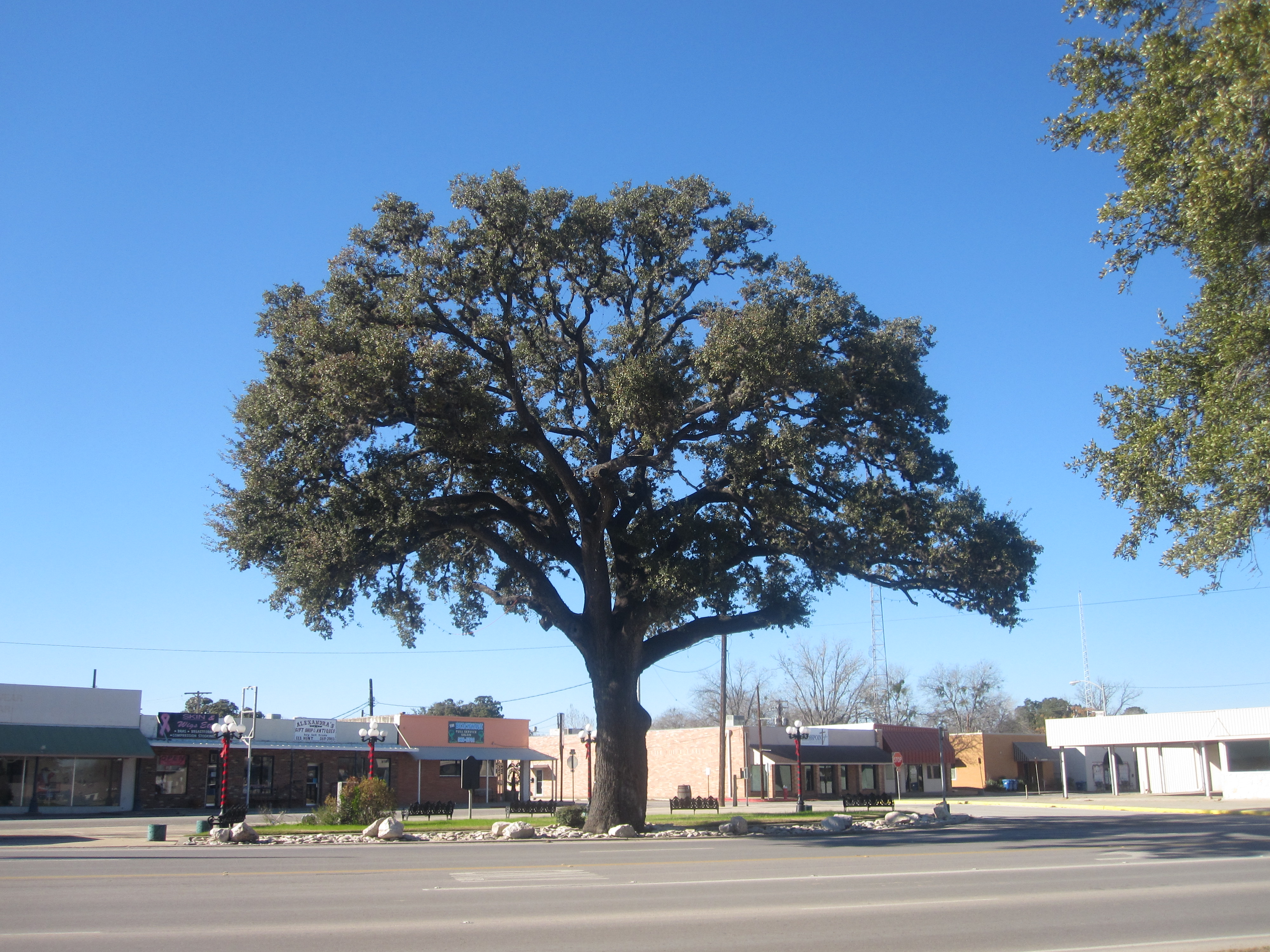
- Giant oak tree in Downtown Pleasanton across from "Mr. Cowboy" sculpture

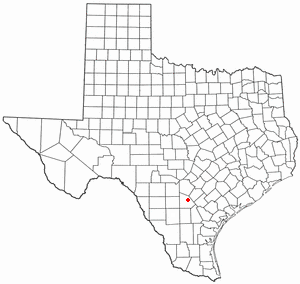
- Location of Pleasanton, Texas

- Coordinates: 28°57′52″N 98°29′46″W
- Country: United States
- State: Texas
- County: Atascosa

Government
  - Type: Council-Manager
  - City Council: Mayor Clinton J. Powell
  - City Manager: Bradley Chambers

Area
  - Total: 8.96 sq mi (23.20 km^{2})
  - Land: 8.96 sq mi (23.20 km^{2})
  - Water: 0 sq mi (0.00 km^{2})
- Elevation: 410 ft (120 m)

Population (2020)
  - Total: 10,648
  - Estimate (2021): 10,780
  - Density: 1,189/sq mi (459.0/km^{2})
- Time zone: UTC-6 (Central (CST))
  - Summer (DST): UTC-5 (CDT)
- ZIP code: 78064
- Area code: 830
- FIPS code: 48-58280
- GNIS feature ID: 2411442
- Website: www.pleasantontx.gov

Pleasanton is a city in Atascosa County, Texas, United States. As of the 2020 census, Pleasanton had a population of 10,648. Pleasanton's official motto is "The City of Live Oaks and Friendly Folks." It is part of the San Antonio-New Braunfels Metropolitan Statistical Area.

== History ==
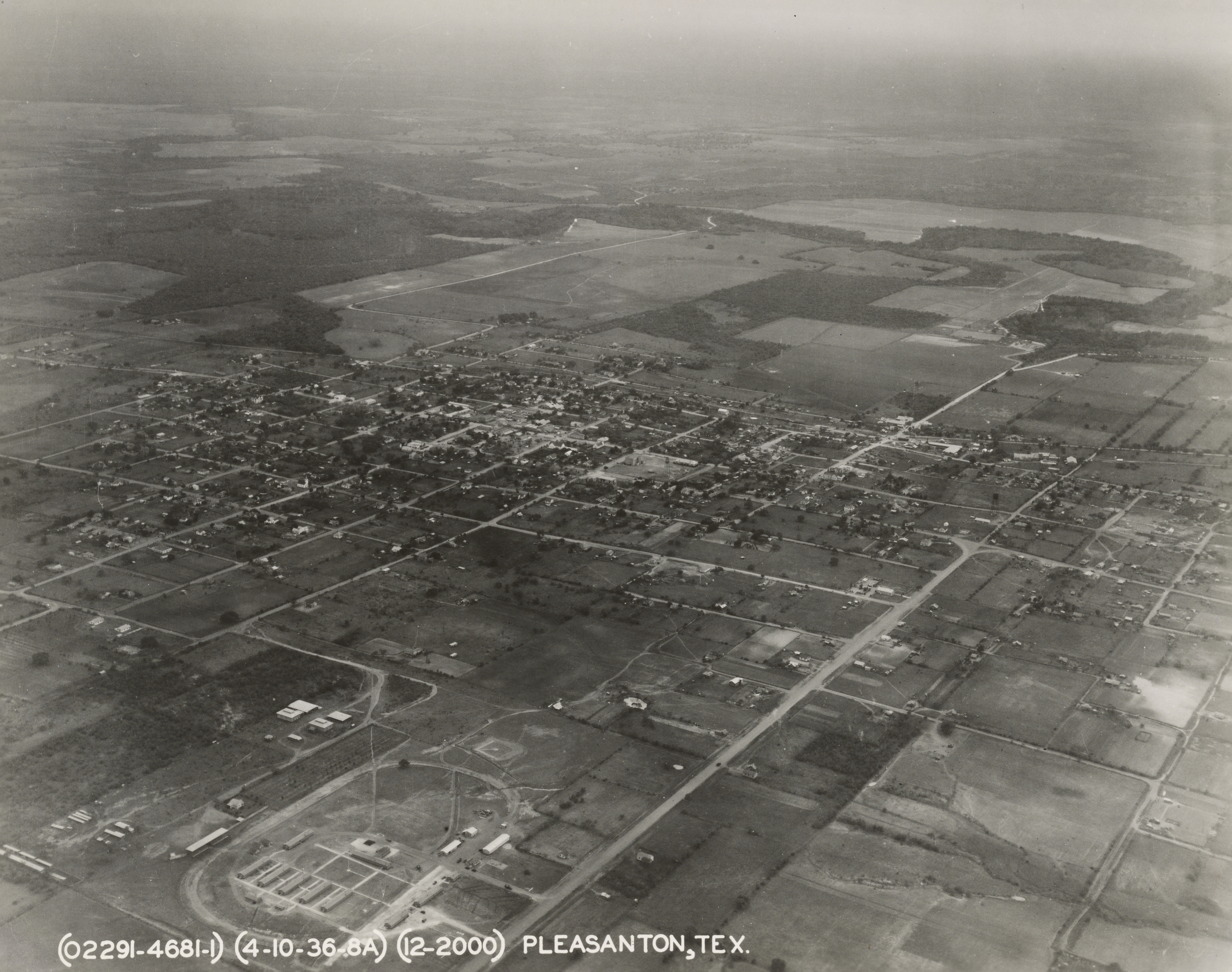
Pleasanton in 1936

Pleasanton was established in 1858 when conflicts with the Native Americans caused the settlers to move the location of the county seat from Amphion. The settlers chose the current townsite because of its location at the mouth of Bonita Creek. John Bowen (died 1867), San Antonio's first Anglo-American postmaster, founded and named the town of Pleasanton after his good friend and fellow early Texas Settler John Pleasants.

At one time Pleasanton had two newspapers, the Pleasanton Picayune, which became the Pleasanton Express in 1909, and the Pleasanton Reporter. The county seat was relocated from Pleasanton to Jourdanton in 1910. Pleasanton was incorporated in 1917.

In November 1957, the citizens of Pleasanton voted overwhelmingly to desegregate the public schools. This came some two months after the crisis at Little Rock Central High School in Arkansas. Some three dozen African American pupils were then integrated into the Pleasanton school.

== Geography ==
Pleasanton is located about 35 miles (56 km) south of downtown San Antonio, 110 miles (180 km) south-southwest of Austin and 110 miles (180 km) north by north-northwest of Corpus Christi.

According to the United States Census Bureau, the city has a total area of 8.5 square miles (22 km^{2}), all land.

The average annual temperature of Pleasanton is 70 °F (21 °C). The mean temperature on January 1 is 50 °F (10 °C) and on June 1 is 78 °F (26 °C). Average annual precipitation is 26.1 inches (660 mm).

Most soils of Pleasanton are quite sandy at the surface but have a clay-rich subsoil that holds moisture. They belong to the Alfisol soil order. Common soil series in town are Nusil, Poth and Rhymes.

== Climate ==
According to the Köppen Climate Classification system, Pleasanton has a humid subtropical climate, abbreviated "Cfa" on climate maps. The hottest temperature recorded in Pleasanton was 113 °F (45.0 °C) on June 15, 1998, and September 5, 2000, while the coldest temperature recorded was 9 °F (−12.8 °C) on January 10–11, 2010.

Climate data for Pleasanton, Texas, 1991–2020 normals, extremes 1948–present
Month	Jan	Feb	Mar	Apr	May	Jun	Jul	Aug	Sep	Oct	Nov	Dec	Year
Record high °F (°C)	89 (32)	100 (38)	101 (38)	103 (39)	105 (41)	113 (45)	108 (42)	111 (44)	113 (45)	102 (39)	94 (34)	89 (32)	113 (45)
Mean maximum °F (°C)	82.0 (27.8)	86.8 (30.4)	91.7 (33.2)	95.3 (35.2)	98.6 (37.0)	101.9 (38.8)	102.8 (39.3)	104.1 (40.1)	100.5 (38.1)	95.1 (35.1)	88.0 (31.1)	82.4 (28.0)	105.8 (41.0)
Mean daily maximum °F (°C)	65.1 (18.4)	68.9 (20.5)	75.7 (24.3)	82.7 (28.2)	88.6 (31.4)	94.1 (34.5)	96.4 (35.8)	97.5 (36.4)	91.8 (33.2)	84.2 (29.0)	73.7 (23.2)	66.3 (19.1)	82.1 (27.8)
Daily mean °F (°C)	52.5 (11.4)	56.7 (13.7)	63.7 (17.6)	70.4 (21.3)	77.8 (25.4)	83.4 (28.6)	85.3 (29.6)	85.7 (29.8)	80.5 (26.9)	71.8 (22.1)	61.7 (16.5)	54.2 (12.3)	70.3 (21.3)
Mean daily minimum °F (°C)	39.9 (4.4)	44.4 (6.9)	51.7 (10.9)	58.1 (14.5)	66.9 (19.4)	72.7 (22.6)	74.3 (23.5)	73.9 (23.3)	69.2 (20.7)	59.4 (15.2)	49.6 (9.8)	42.0 (5.6)	58.5 (14.7)
Mean minimum °F (°C)	25.5 (−3.6)	28.7 (−1.8)	32.9 (0.5)	41.9 (5.5)	51.8 (11.0)	65.3 (18.5)	68.9 (20.5)	68.5 (20.3)	56.4 (13.6)	41.5 (5.3)	32.1 (0.1)	26.1 (−3.3)	23.0 (−5.0)
Record low °F (°C)	9 (−13)	11 (−12)	22 (−6)	33 (1)	40 (4)	59 (15)	59 (15)	60 (16)	46 (8)	32 (0)	24 (−4)	15 (−9)	9 (−13)
Average precipitation inches (mm)	1.98 (50)	1.76 (45)	2.26 (57)	2.36 (60)	3.89 (99)	3.79 (96)	2.63 (67)	2.46 (62)	3.58 (91)	2.72 (69)	2.19 (56)	1.91 (49)	31.53 (801)
Average snowfall inches (cm)	0.0 (0.0)	0.0 (0.0)	0.0 (0.0)	0.0 (0.0)	0.0 (0.0)	0.0 (0.0)	0.0 (0.0)	0.0 (0.0)	0.0 (0.0)	0.0 (0.0)	0.0 (0.0)	0.3 (0.76)	0.3 (0.76)
Average precipitation days (≥ 0.01 in)	7.3	7.4	6.5	5.2	6.5	6.6	5.0	4.1	6.7	5.4	5.9	6.7	73.3
Average snowy days (≥ 0.1 in)	0.0	0.0	0.0	0.0	0.0	0.0	0.0	0.0	0.0	0.0	0.0	0.1	0.1
Source 1: NOAA
Source 2: National Weather Service

== Demographics ==
Historical population
Census	Pop.	Note	%±
1870	206		—
1880	393		90.8%
1890	367		−6.6%
1920	1,036		—
1930	1,154		11.4%
1940	2,074		79.7%
1950	2,913		40.5%
1960	3,467		19.0%
1970	5,407		56.0%
1980	6,346		17.4%
1990	7,678		21.0%
2000	8,266		7.7%
2010	8,934		8.1%
2020	10,648		19.2%
2021 (est.)	10,780		1.2%
U.S. Decennial Census

=== 2020 census ===
As of the 2020 census, Pleasanton had a population of 10,648 and 2,558 families. The median age was 35.7 years. 26.9% of residents were under the age of 18 and 16.0% of residents were 65 years of age or older. For every 100 females there were 95.6 males, and for every 100 females age 18 and over there were 91.2 males age 18 and over.

95.7% of residents lived in urban areas, while 4.3% lived in rural areas.

There were 3,797 households in Pleasanton, of which 36.1% had children under the age of 18 living in them. Of all households, 48.4% were married-couple households, 17.2% were households with a male householder and no spouse or partner present, and 27.0% were households with a female householder and no spouse or partner present. About 24.8% of all households were made up of individuals and 10.8% had someone living alone who was 65 years of age or older.

There were 4,314 housing units, of which 12.0% were vacant. The homeowner vacancy rate was 2.7% and the rental vacancy rate was 13.8%.

Racial composition as of the 2020 census
Race	Number	Percent
White	6,588	61.9%
Black or African American	97	0.9%
American Indian and Alaska Native	87	0.8%
Asian	56	0.5%
Native Hawaiian and Other Pacific Islander	5	0.0%
Some other race	1,427	13.4%
Two or more races	2,388	22.4%
Hispanic or Latino (of any race)	5,872	55.1%

=== 2000 census ===
As of the census of 2000, there were 8,266 people, 2,941 households, and 2,135 families residing in the city. The population density was 1,293.5 inhabitants per square mile (499.4/km^{2}). There were 3,212 housing units at an average density of 502.6 per square mile (194.1/km^{2}). The racial makeup of the city was 79.13% White, 0.98% African American, 0.97% Native American, 0.50% Asian, 0.17% Pacific Islander, 15.34% from other races, and 2.92% from two or more races. Hispanic or Latino of any race were 51.15% of the population.

There were 2,941 households, out of which 39.0% had children under the age of 18 living with them, 52.8% were married couples living together, 15.0% had a female householder with no husband present, and 27.4% were non-families. 23.7% of all households were made up of individuals, and 11.7% had someone living alone who was 65 years of age or older. The average household size was 2.77 and the average family size was 3.28.

In the city, the population was spread out, with 30.4% under the age of 18, 9.0% from 18 to 24, 27.1% from 25 to 44, 19.9% from 45 to 64, and 13.6% who were 65 years of age or older. The median age was 33 years. For every 100 females, there were 90.7 males. For every 100 females age 18 and over, there were 87.2 males.

The median income for a household in the city was $29,644, and the median income for a family was $34,718. Males had a median income of $28,849 versus $20,144 for females. The per capita income for the city was $14,878. About 16.8% of families and 22.2% of the population were below the poverty line, including 30.9% of those under age 18 and 21.8% of those aged 65 or over.

== Culture ==
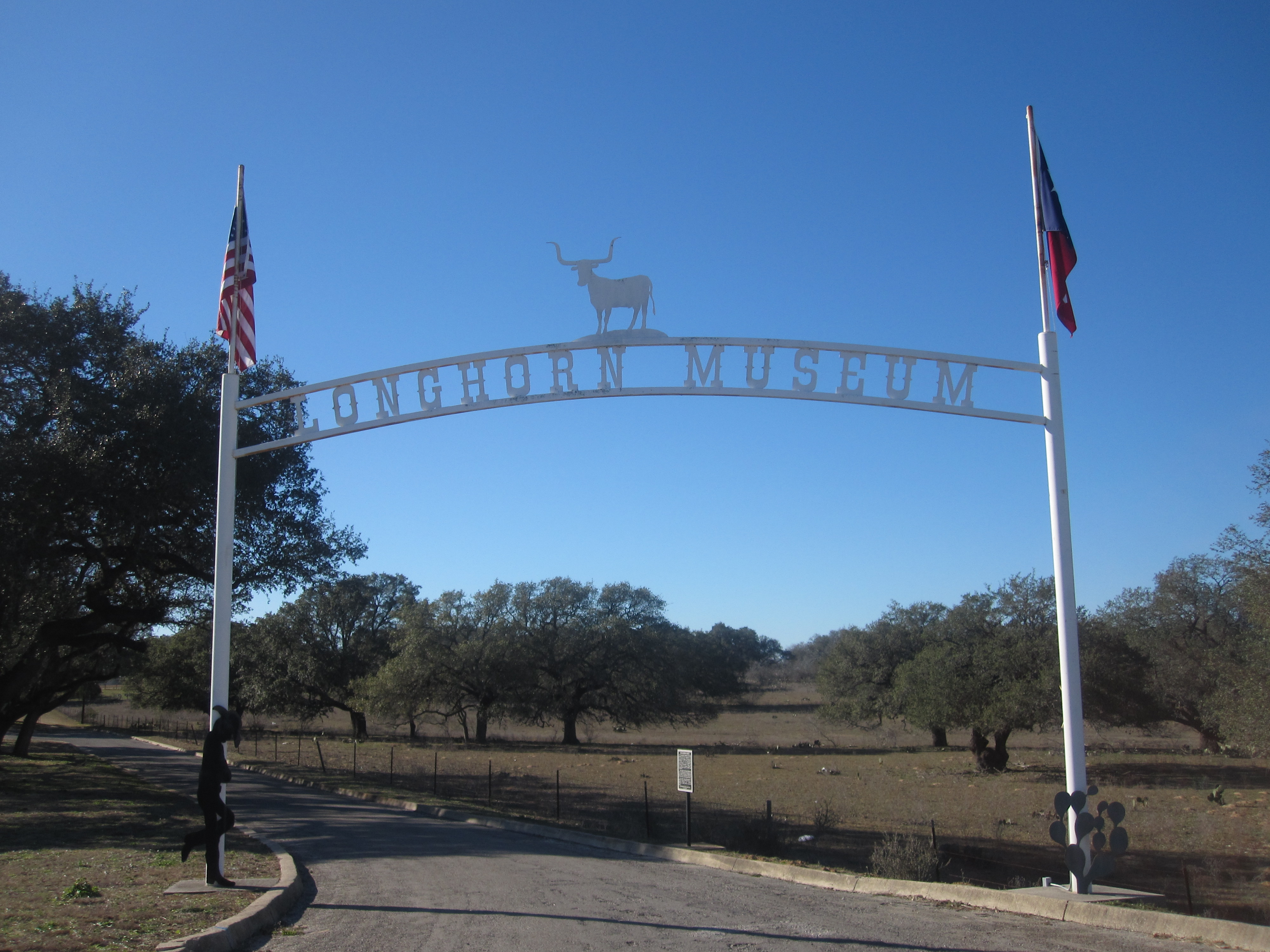
Entrance to Longhorn Museum on Texas State Highway 97 on the east side of Pleasanton

Part of the film The Sugarland Express was filmed around the intersection of 2nd Street and Commerce Street.

Every year in October, Pleasanton hosts the "Cowboy Homecoming Festival", which commemorates the time when the cowboys driving cattle from South Texas to the railheads up north would return home.

== Education ==
Almost all of Pleasanton is located within the Pleasanton Independent School District and home to the Pleasanton High School Eagles. In the school year 2010–2011, Pleasanton I.S.D. received Academically Unacceptable ratings from the Texas Education Agency for their high school campus and their school of choice. The school district received an Acceptable rating for their junior high and Exceptional for the elementary and primary campuses. Under the current Texas accountability system, on a A-F rating scale, Pleasanton I.S.D. is rated "B". A small portion of the town is in the Jourdanton Independent School District.

Coastal Bend College of Beeville maintains a branch two-year campus in Pleasanton.

== Notable people ==
- Willie Nelson, was a radio DJ in Pleasanton at one time
- Pete Flores, Texas State Senator, 19th district
- George Strait, Country & Western Singer, George's parents lived in Pleasanton when George was born at the hospital in Poteet.

== Gallery ==
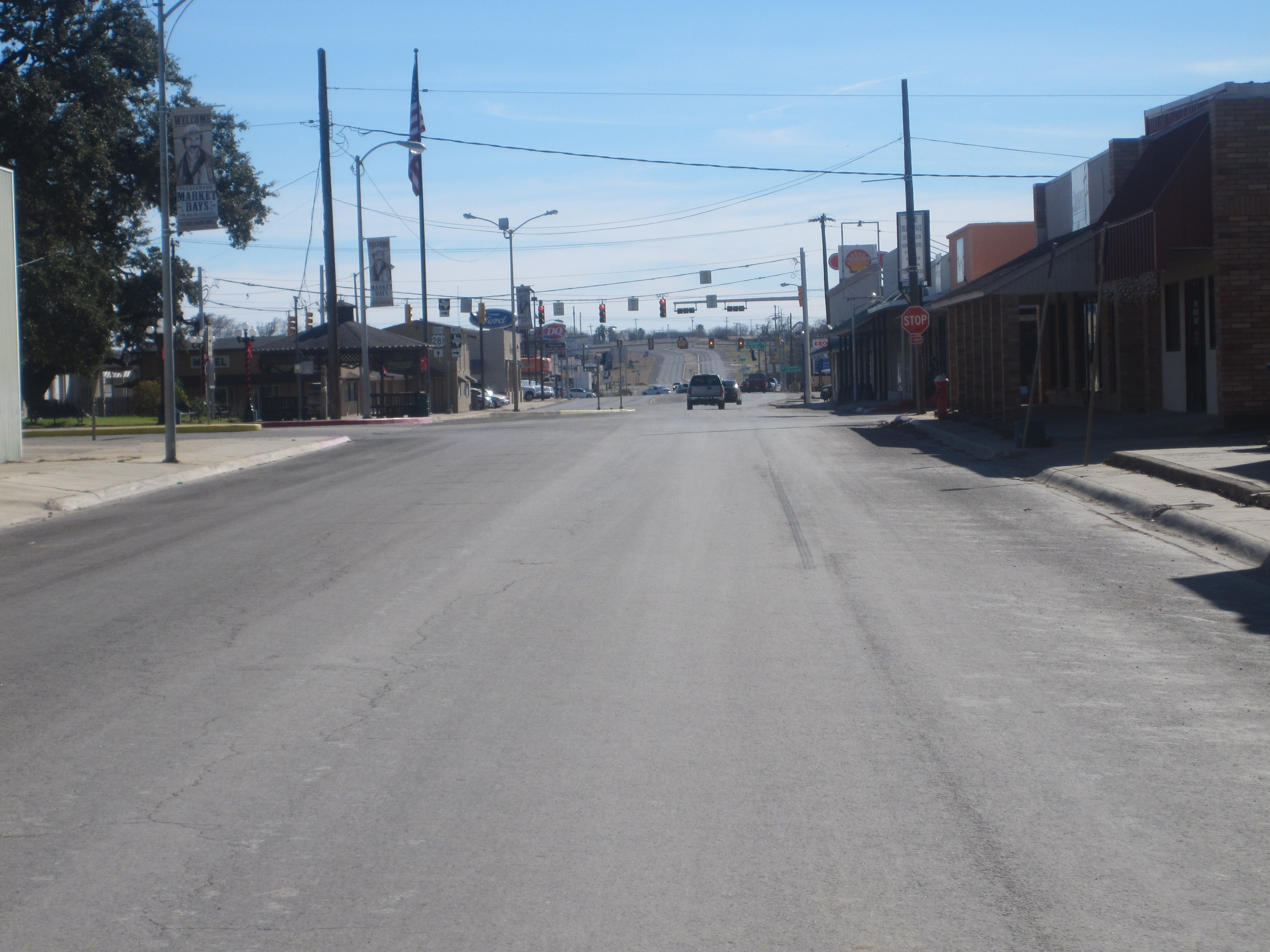
A view of downtown Pleasanton near the intersection of U.S. Highway 281 south and Farm to Market Road 3350 west

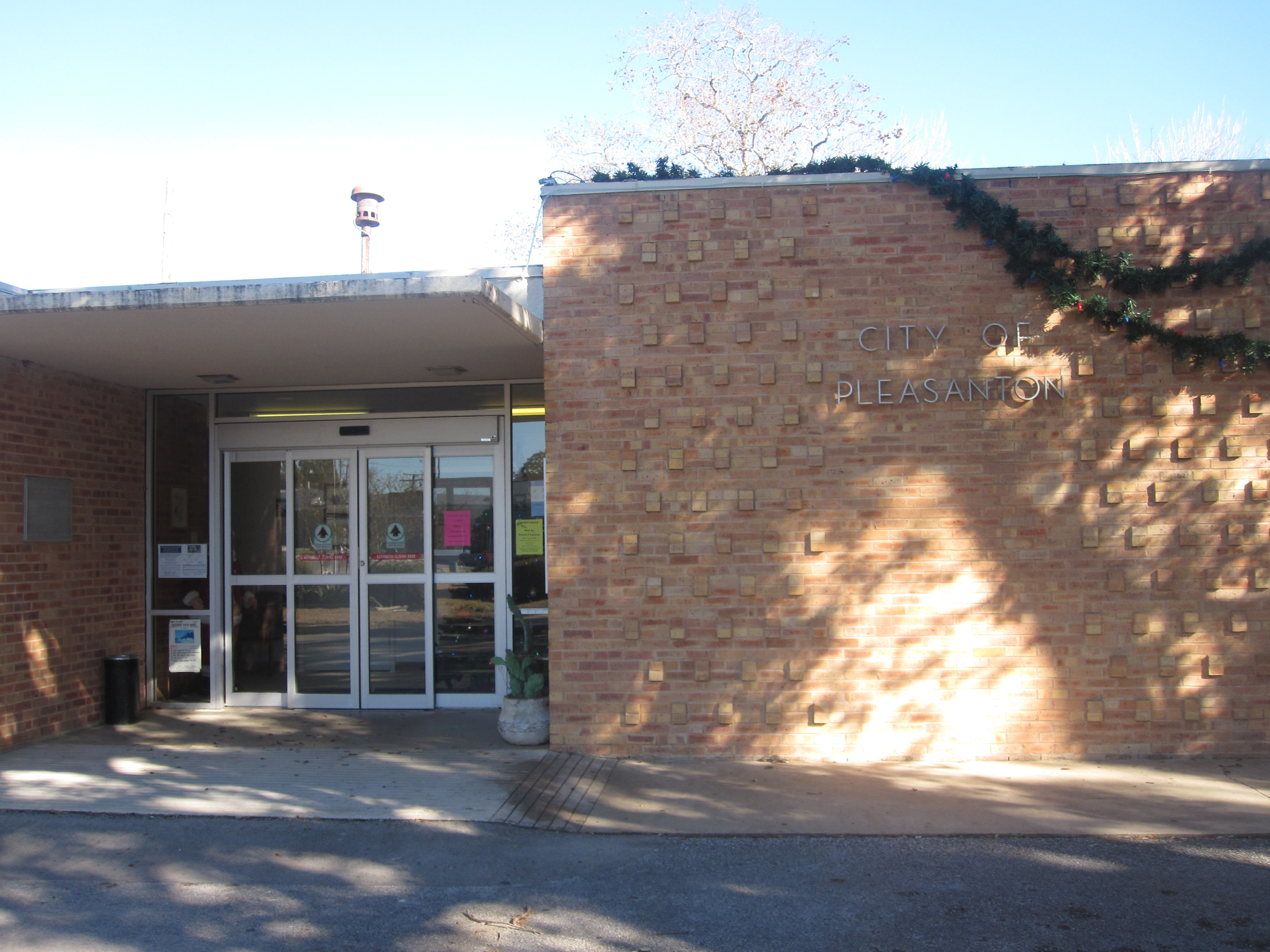
Pleasanton City Hall is located across from the great oak tree downtown.

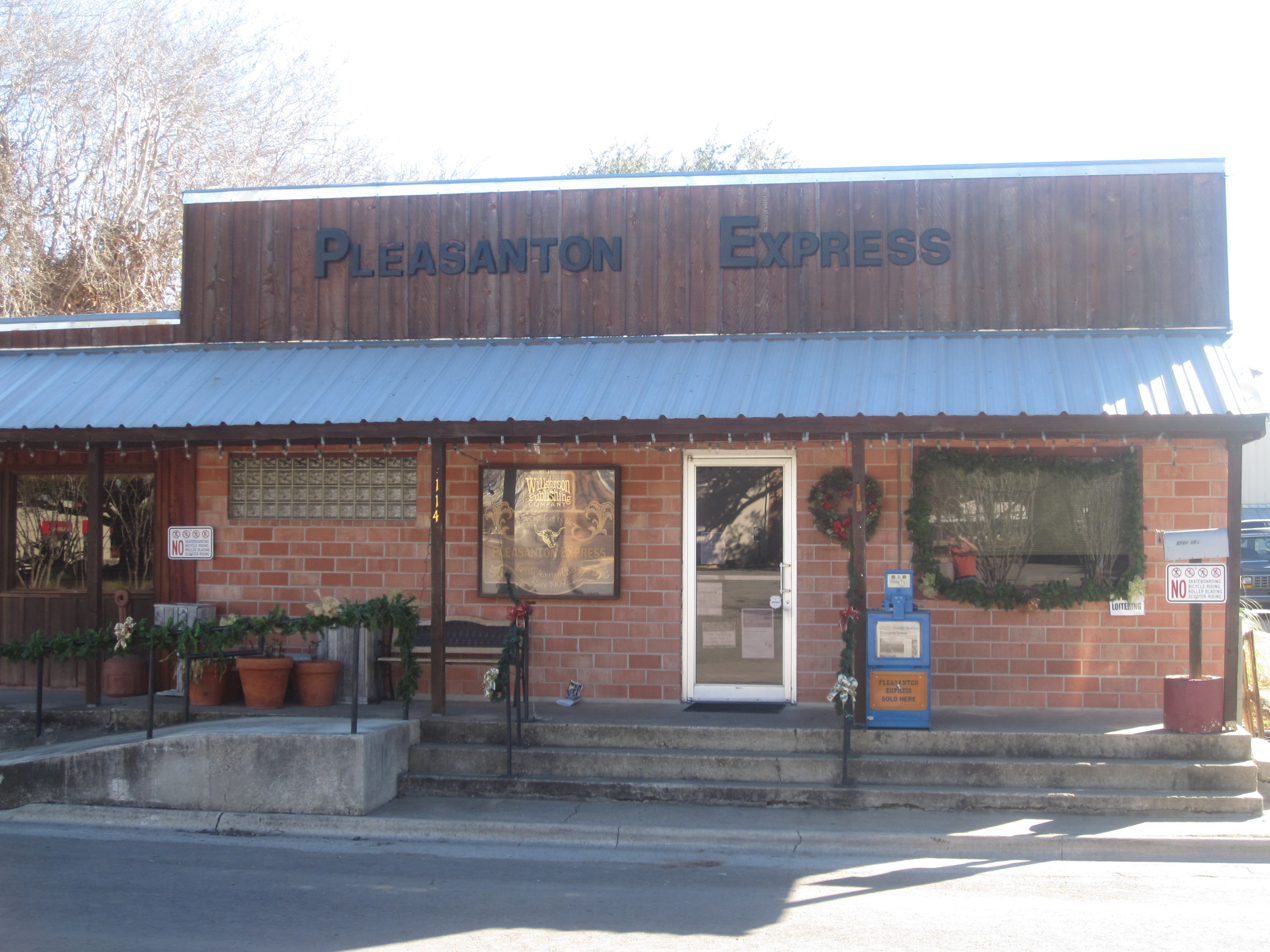
The Pleasanton Express office is located next to City Hall.

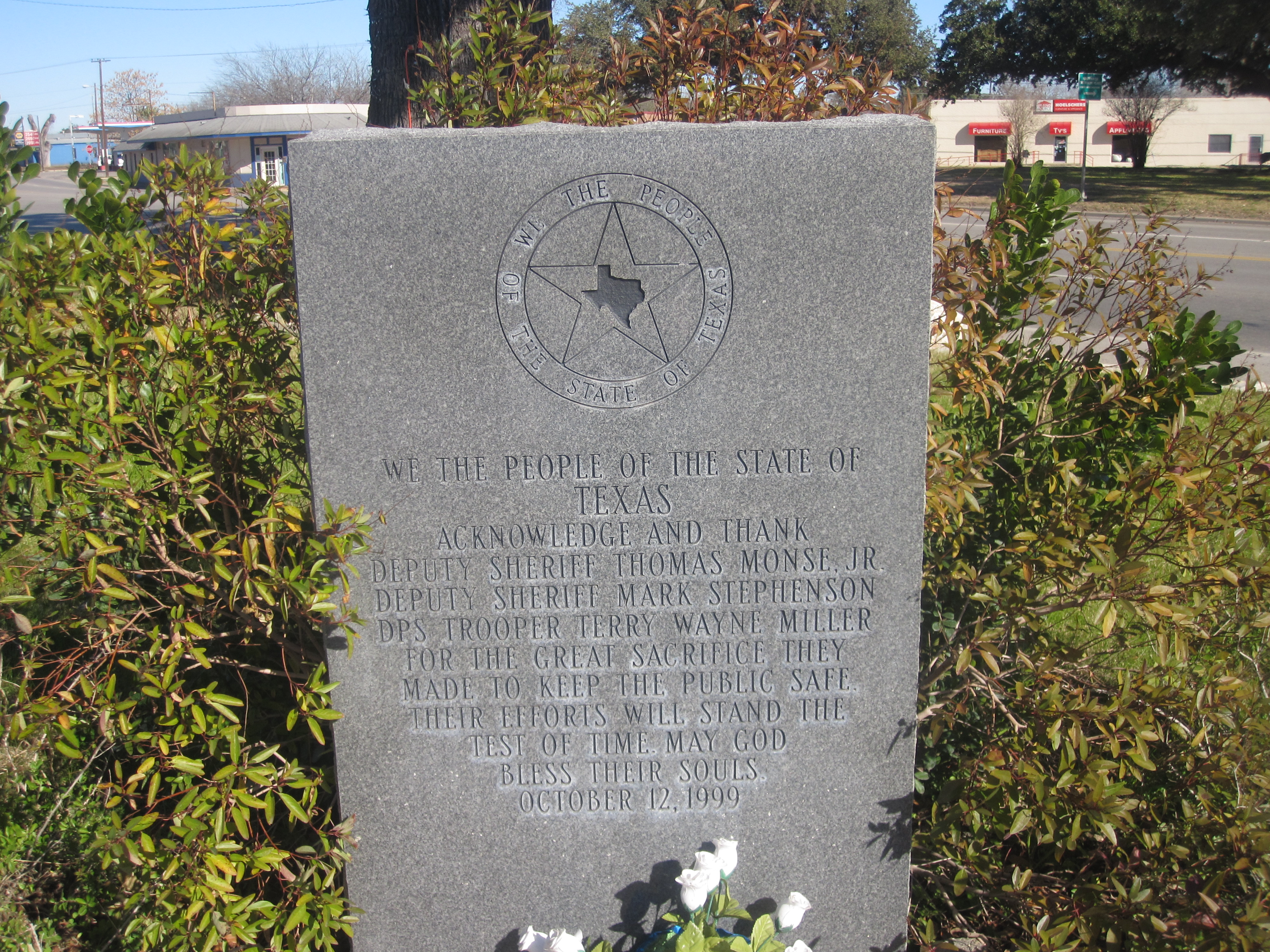
Deputy Sheriffs Thomas Monse, Jr., and Mark Stephenson and state police trooper Terry Wayne Miller are commemorated in a marker in Pleasanton. The three were killed in the line of duty on October 12, 1999.

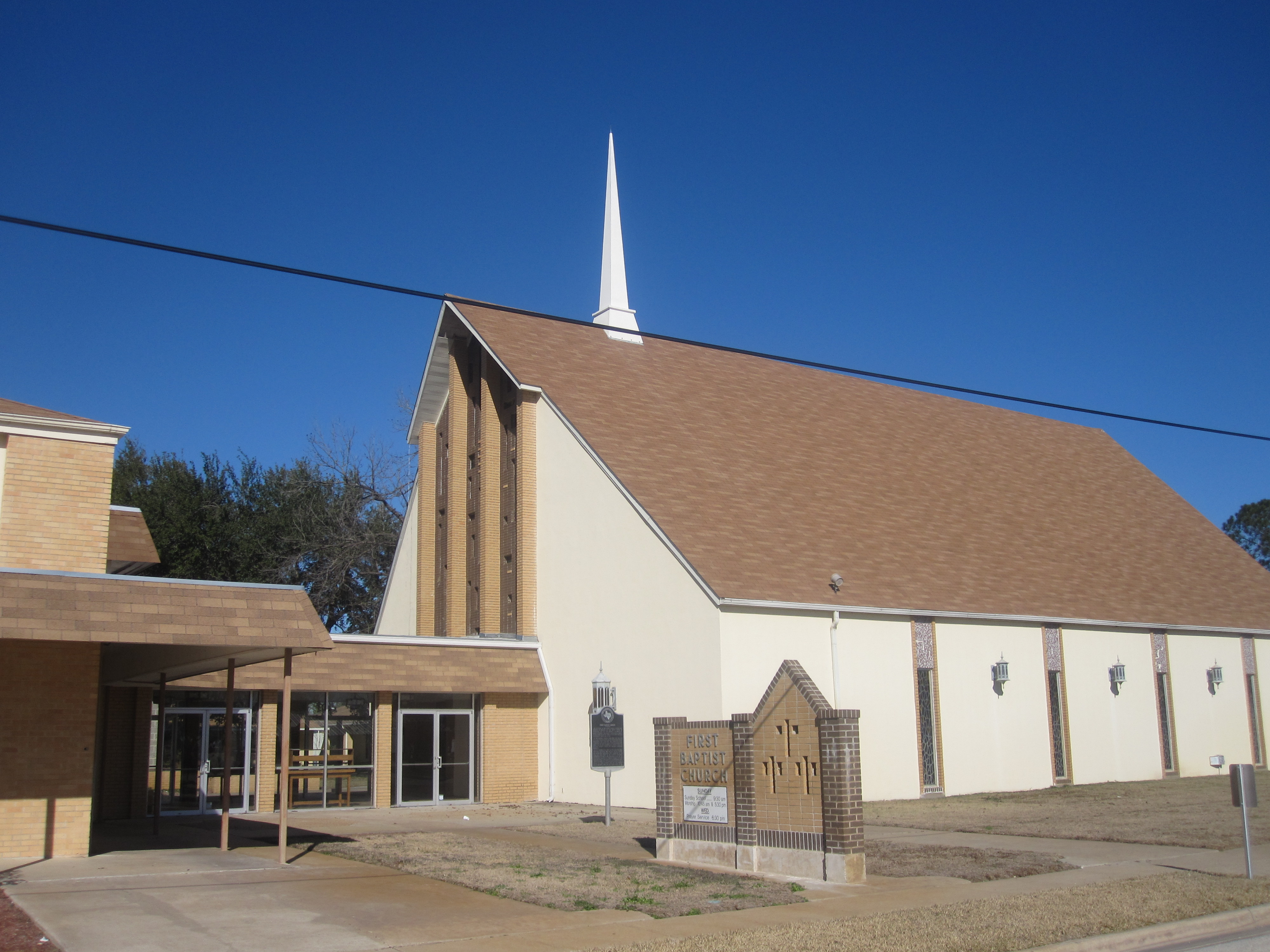
First Baptist Church of Pleasanton was founded by seven charter members in 1866. The congregation originally met in the courthouse when it was located in Pleasanton.

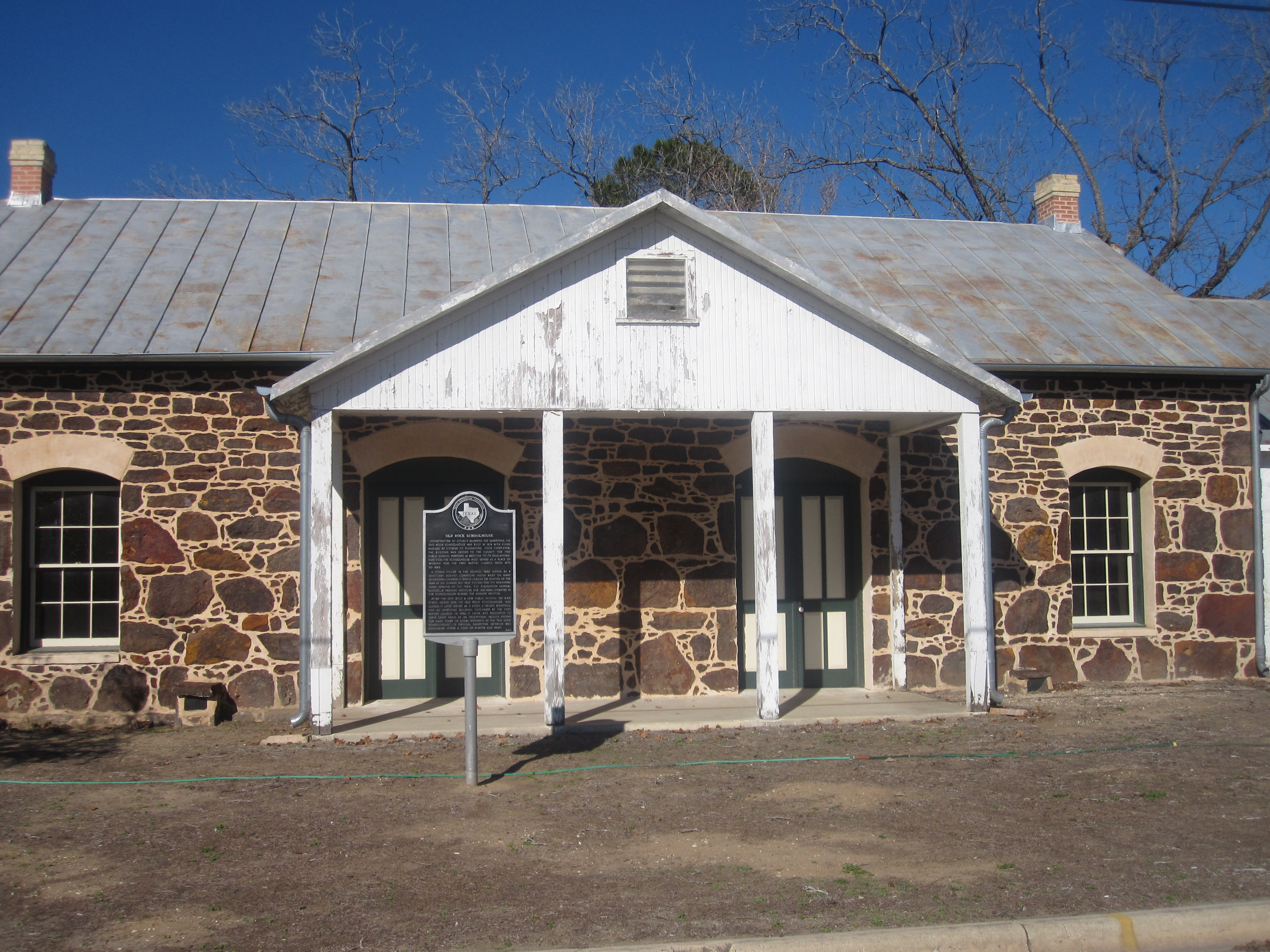
The Old Rock Schoolhouse, built of locally procured red sandstone, housed the First Baptist Church (located next door) from 1875 to 1883.

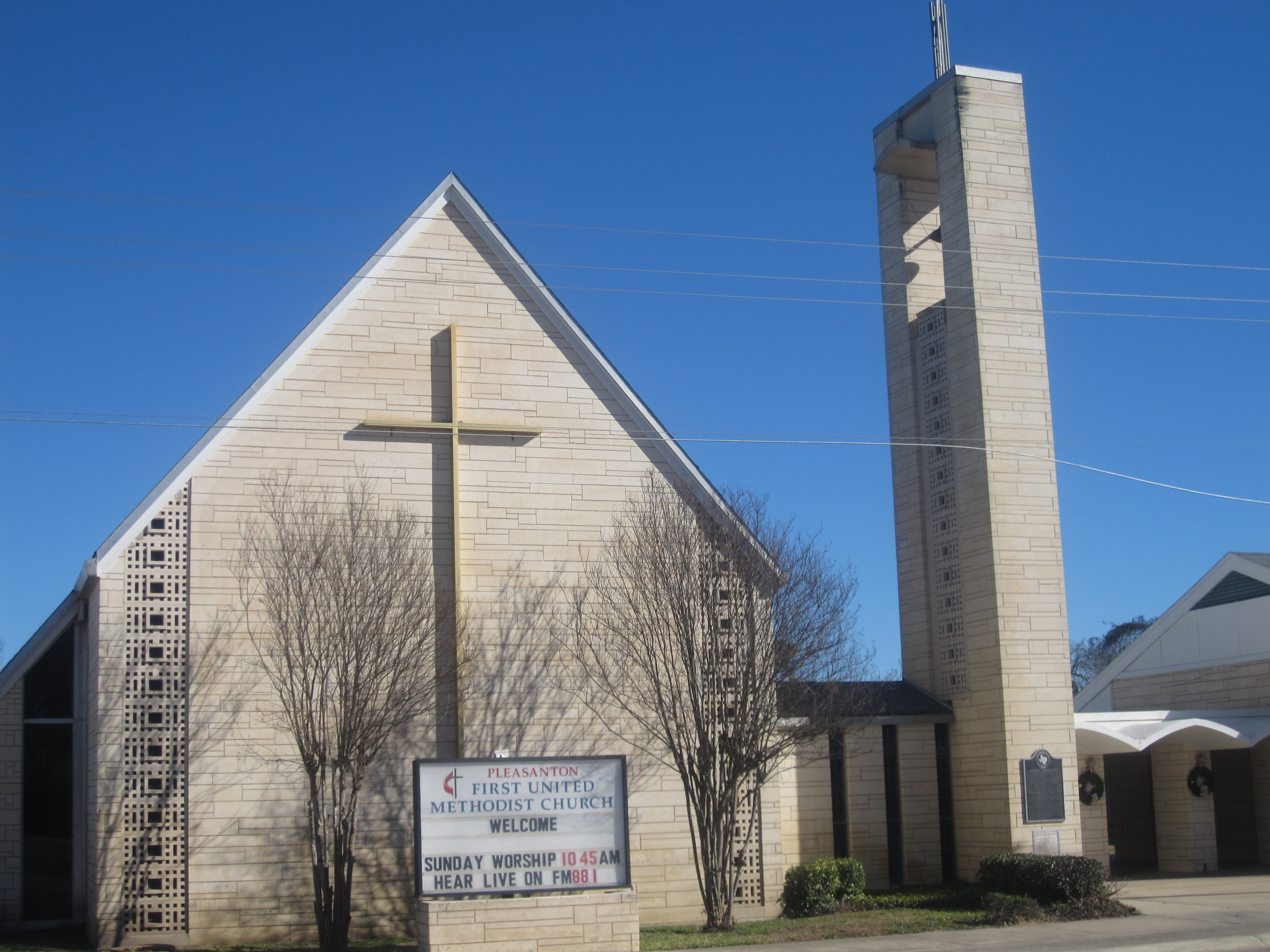
First United Methodist Church in downtown Pleasanton was founded in 1857 by circuit riders, a year before Pleasanton was established.

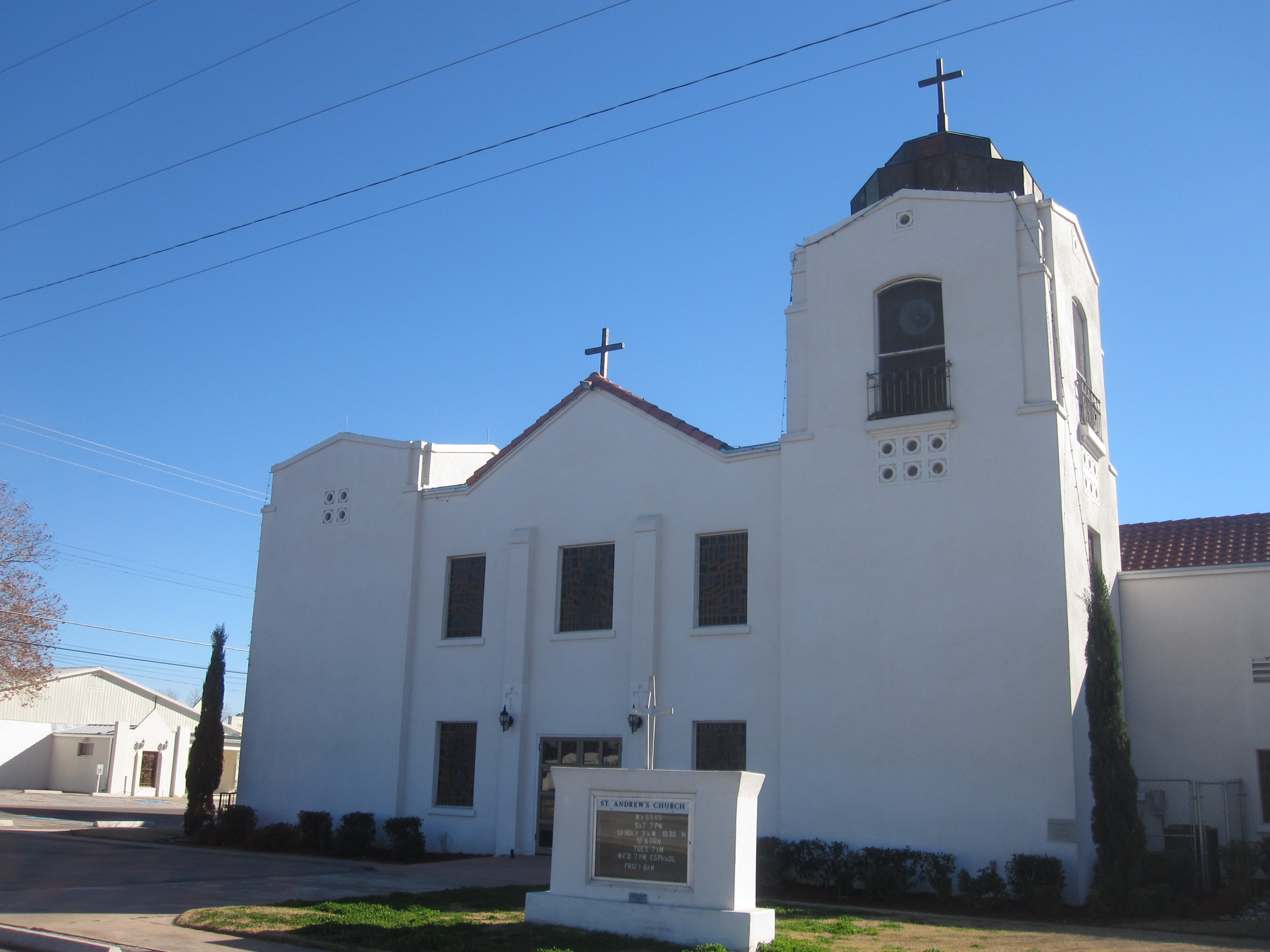
St. Andrew's Catholic Church in Pleasanton

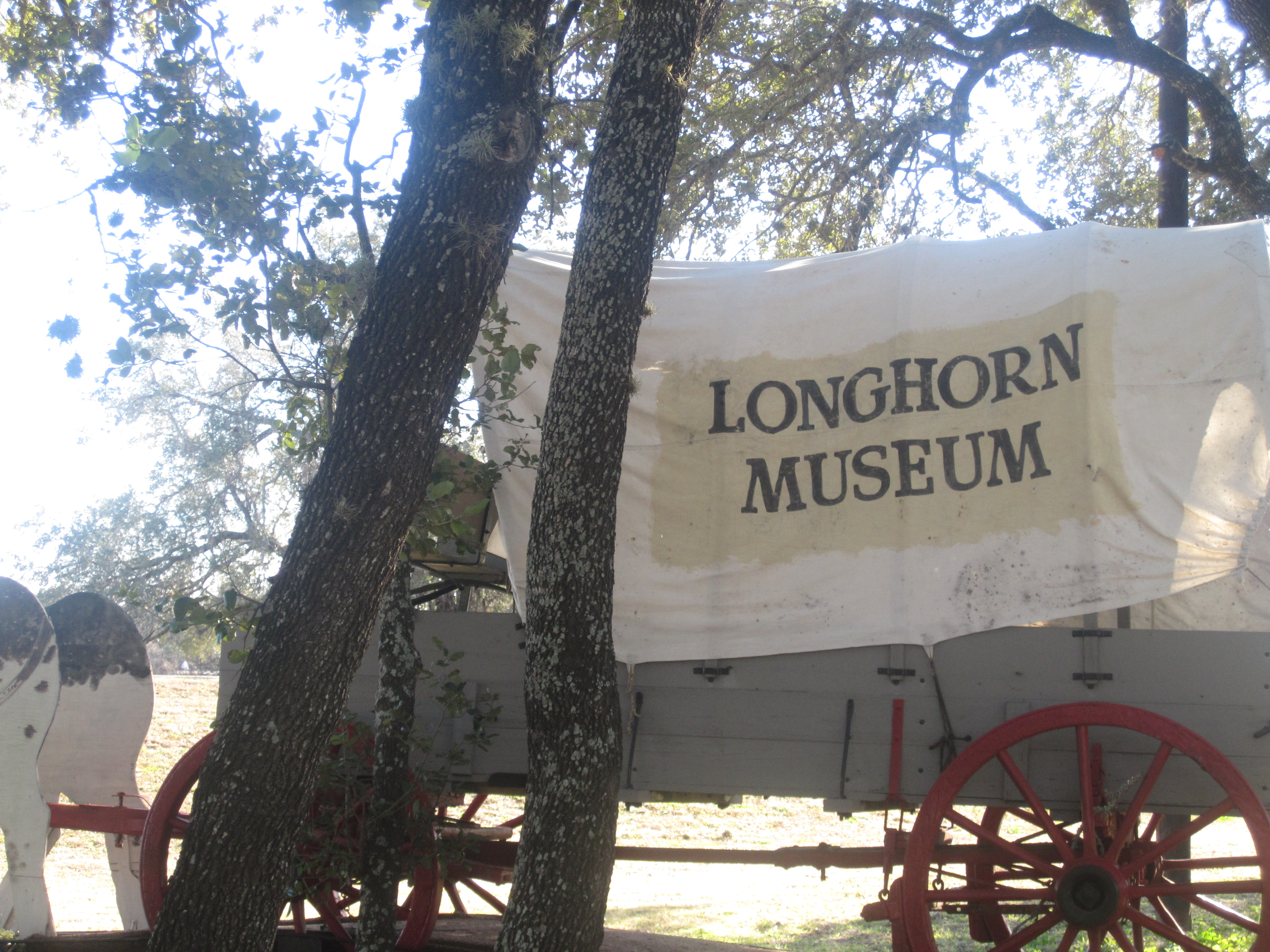
Covered wagon sign attracts motorists off Highway 97 to the Longhorn Museum in Pleasanton.

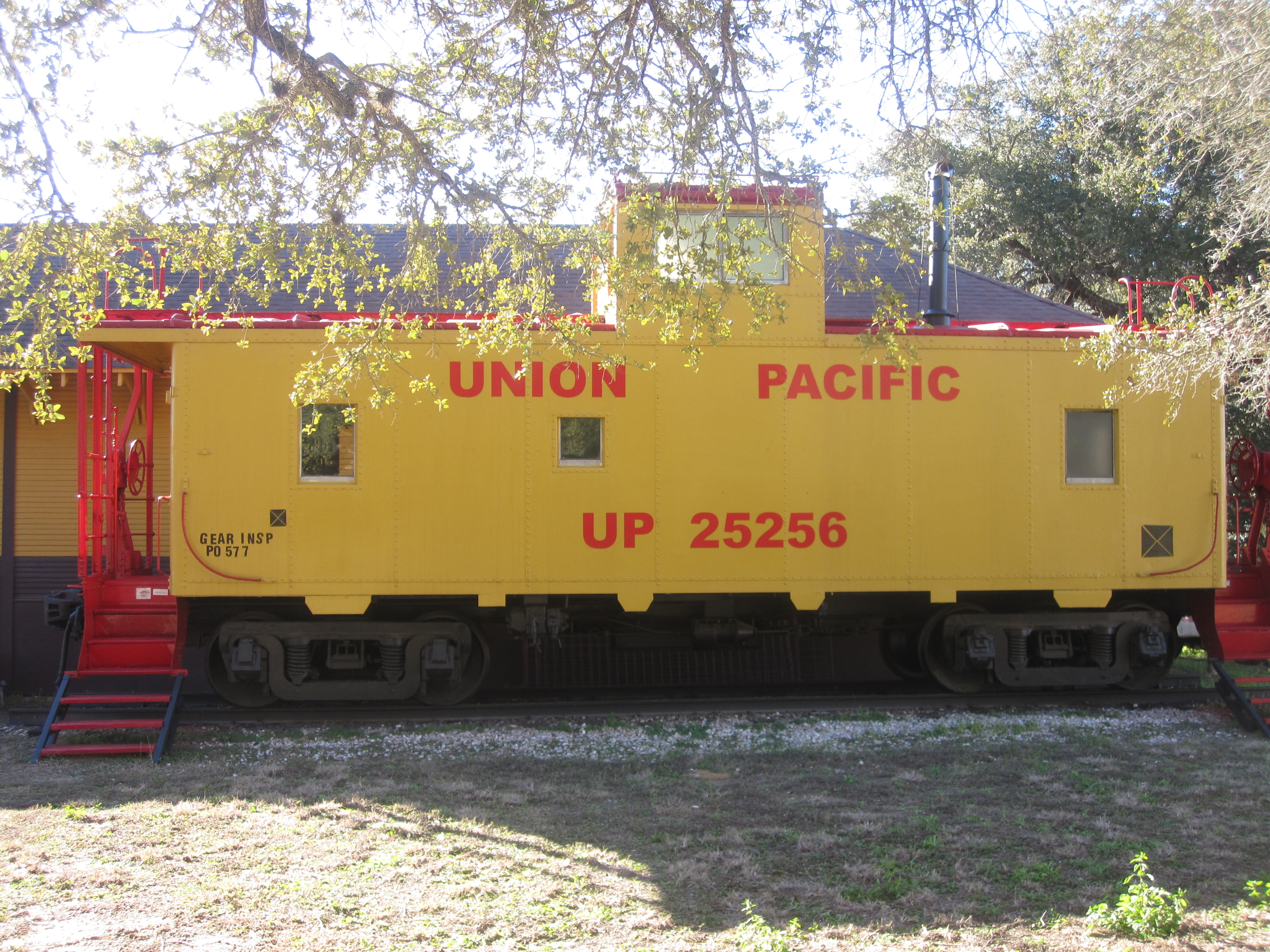
Union Pacific rail car at Longhorn Museum

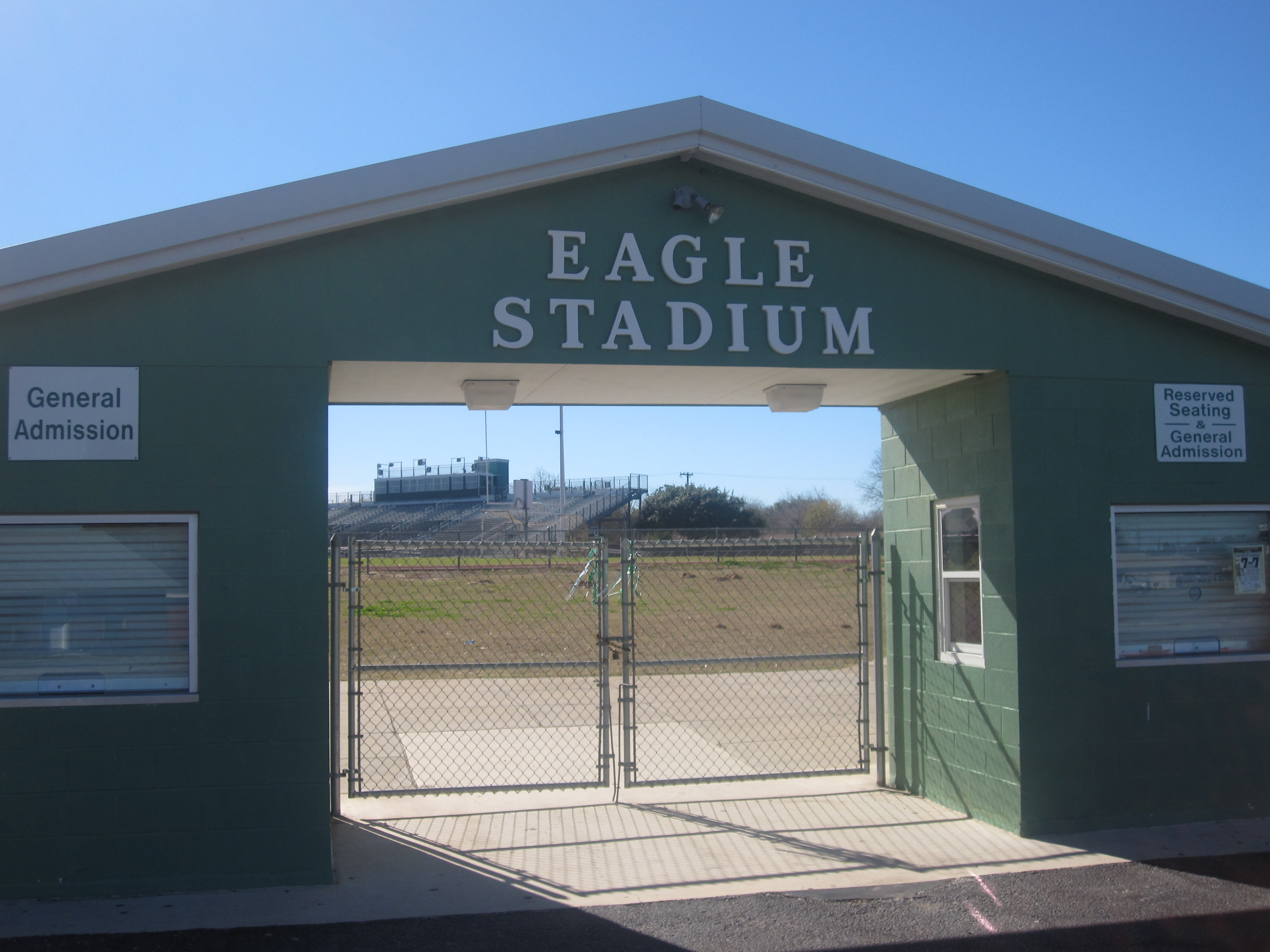
The Pleasanton High School Eagles play football in Eagle Stadium.

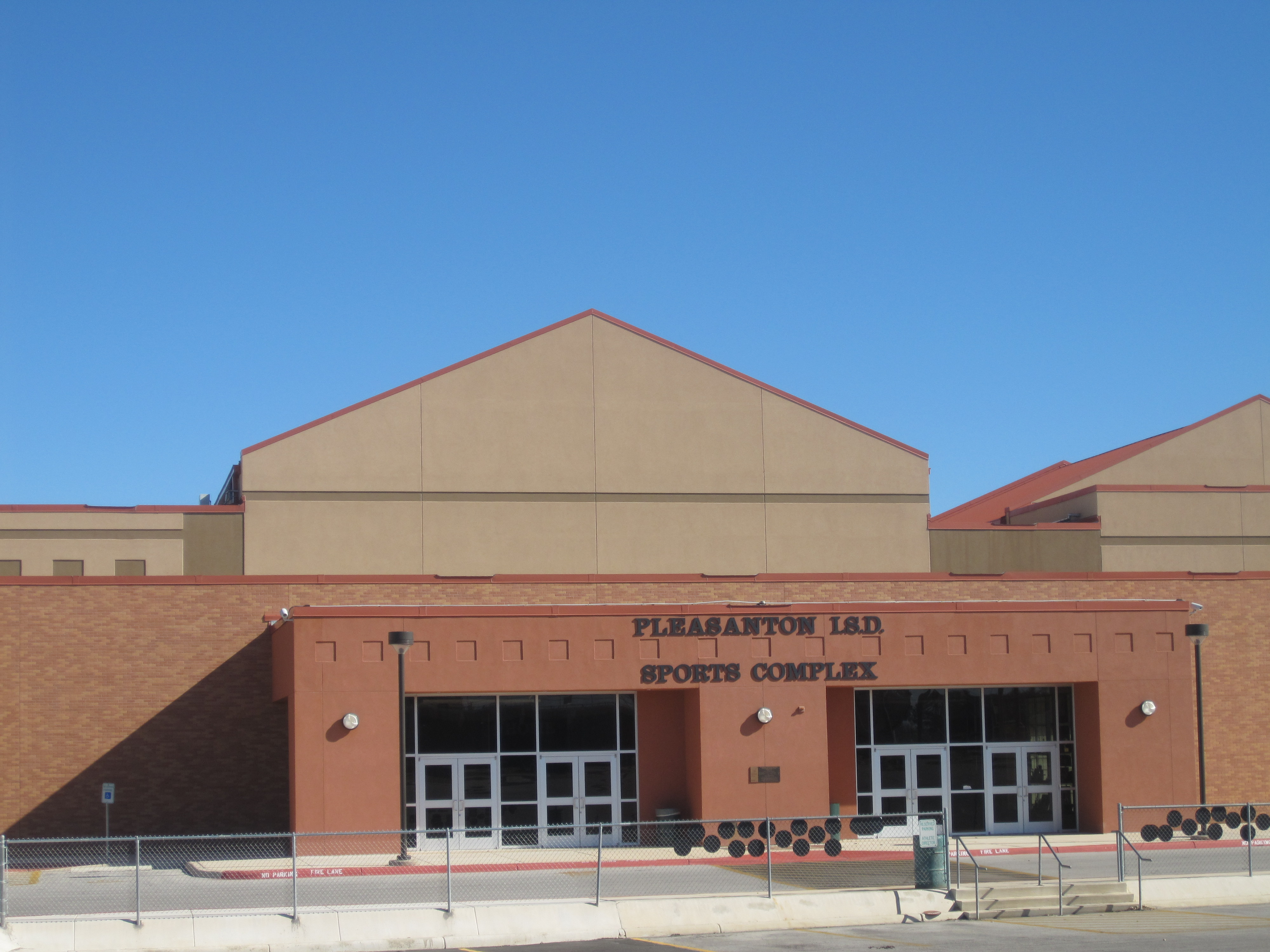
Modern sports complex for Pleasanton Independent School District, located across from Eagles Stadium

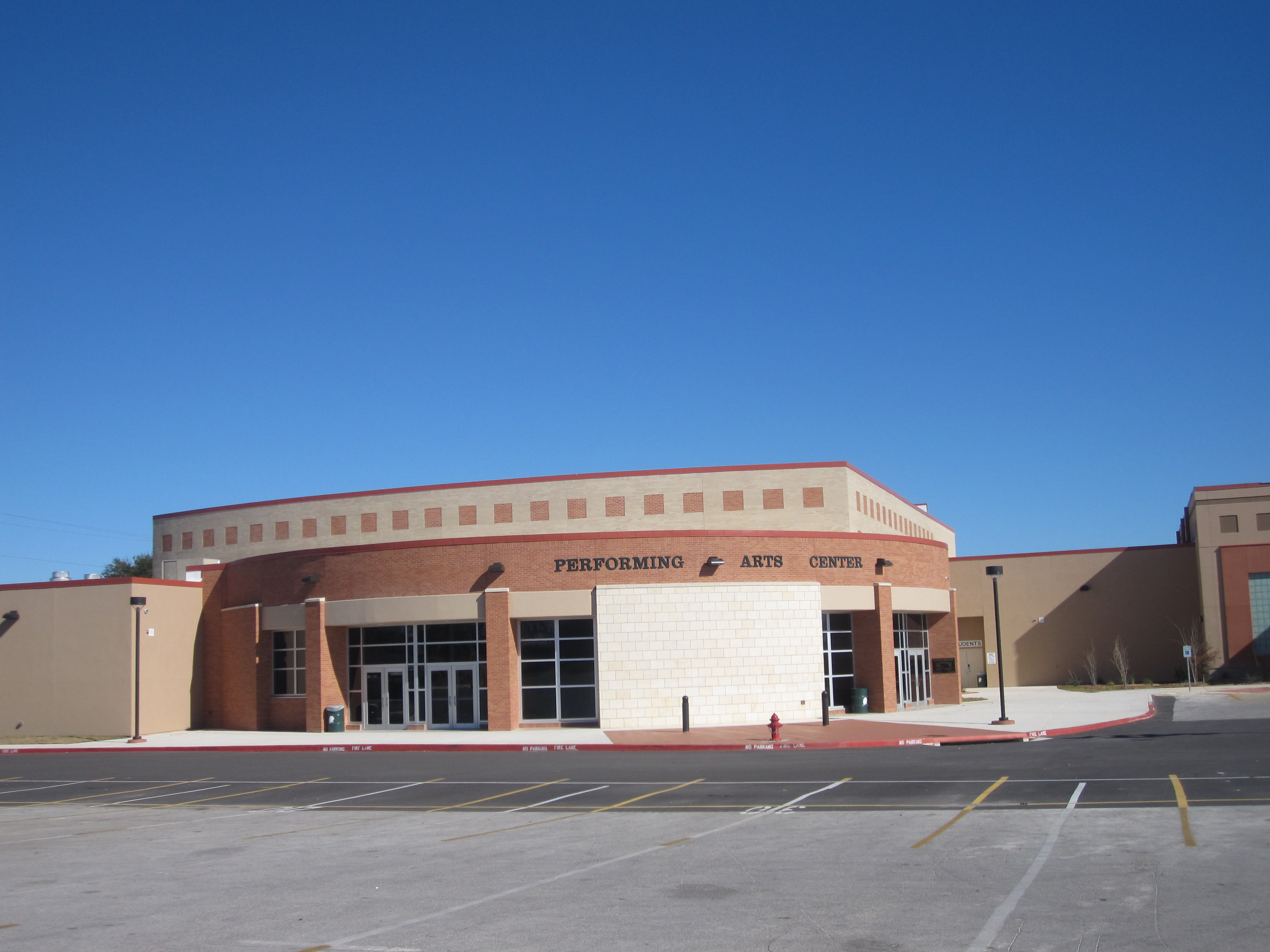
Performing Arts Center of Pleasanton public schools

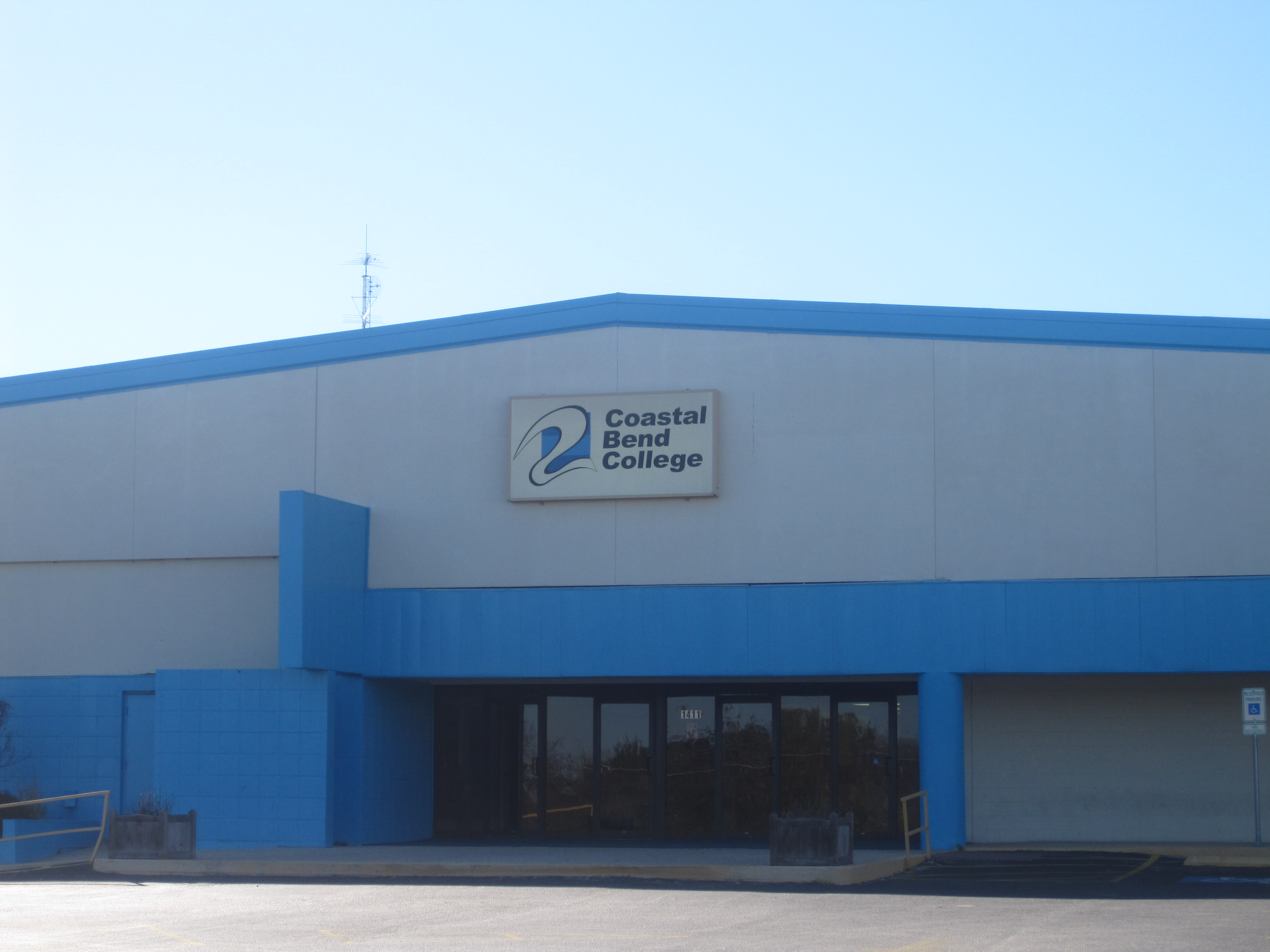
Coastal Bend College of Beeville operates a branch campus in Pleasanton.
