= Montgomery Area School District =

School district in Pennsylvania

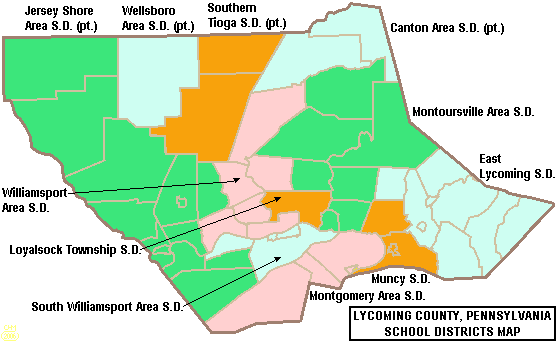

Address
- 120 Penn Street Montgomery, Lycoming County, Pennsylvania, 17752; United States
- Motto: Doing whatever it takes for all students to succeed

Other information
- Website: www.montasd.org

The Montgomery Area School District is a small, rural, public school district in Lycoming County. The school is centered on the borough of Montgomery and also serves: Clinton Township, Brady Township, and Washington Township. The district encompasses approximately 87 square miles (230 km^{2}). According to 2000 federal census data, it serves a resident population of 7,749. By 2010, the district's population declined to 7,429 people. In 2009, the district residents’ per capita income was $14,133, while the median family income was $42,027. In the Commonwealth, the median family income was $49,501 and the United States median family income was $49,445, in 2010. The educational attainment levels for the population (25 years old and over) were 81.9% high school graduates and 10.9% college graduates.

According to the Pennsylvania Budget and Policy Center, 58.3% of the district's pupils lived at 185% or below the Federal Poverty Level as shown by their eligibility for the federal free or reduced price school meal programs in 2012. In Lycoming County, the median household income was $45,430. By 2013, the median household income in the United States rose to $52,100. In 2014, the median household income in the USA was $53,700.

Montgomery Area School District operates 3 public schools: Montgomery Area High School, Montgomery Middle School and Montgomery Elementary School. The BLaST Intermediate Unit IU17 provides the district with a wide variety of services like specialized education for disabled students and hearing, speech and visual disability services and professional development for staff and faculty. The district does not participate in a career and technical school in the region. Elimsport Elementary School was closed at the end of the 2011 school year due to low enrollment and district budget constraints.

== Extracurriculars ==
The Montgomery Area School District offers a wide variety of clubs, activities and an extensive sports program. Several sports are offered in cooperation with the Muncy School District.

=== Sports ===
The district funds:

Boys

- Baseball - A
- Basketball- A
- Football - A
- Golf - AA
- Soccer - A
- Tennis - AA
- Track and field - AA
- Wrestling - AA

Girls

- Basketball - A
- Golf - AA
- Soccer - A
- Softball - A
- Tennis - AA
- Track and field - AA

Junior high school sports

Boys

- Basketball
- Football
- Wrestling

Girls

- Basketball

According to PIAA directory July 2015
