= Montgomery Area High School =

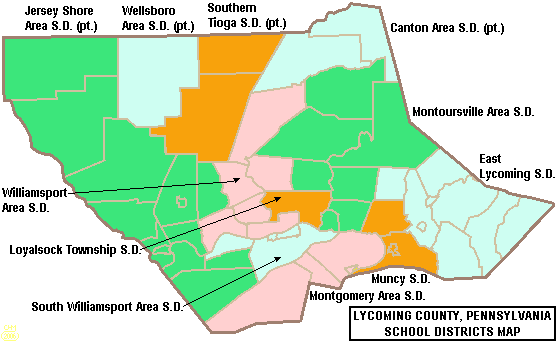

Location
- 120 Penn Street; Montgomery, Lycoming County, Pennsylvania 17752-1144; United States; 41.1751°N 76.8733°W

Information
- Type: Public
- Motto: Doing whatever it takes for all students to succeed
- Principal: Joe Stoudt, High School Principal; Linda Gutkowski, JHS Principal
- Staff: 32.83 (FTE)
- Faculty: 22 teachers (2014); 23 teachers (2013)
- Grades: 7th-12th (2015), previously 9th-12th (2000-2014)
- Enrollment: 417 (2022-2023)
- Student to teacher ratio: 12.70
- Language: English
- Website: https://www.montasd.org/page/montgomery-jrsr-high-school

Montgomery Area High School is a diminutive public high school in Montgomery, Lycoming County, Pennsylvania. It is the sole high school operated by the Montgomery Area School District. Montgomery Area High School serves: the borough of Montgomery as well as Clinton Township, Brady Township, and Washington Township in Lycoming County. The Montgomery Area School Board converted the high school to a joint junior and senior high school for 2014–15, due to low enrollment.

In 2015, enrollment was reported as 364 pupils in 7th through 12th grades. The school employed 23 teachers.

== Extracurriculars ==
The Montgomery Area School District offers a wide variety of clubs, activities and an extensive sports program. Several sports are offered in cooperation with the Muncy School District.

=== Sports ===
The district funds:

Varsity Boys

- Baseball - A
- Basketball- A
- Football - A
- Golf - AA
- Soccer - A
- Tennis - AA
- Track and field - AA
- Wrestling - AA

Varsity Girls

- Basketball - A
- Golf - AA
- Soccer - A
- Softball - A
- Tennis - AA
- Track and field - AA

Junior high school

Boys

- Basketball
- Football
- Wrestling

Girls

- Basketball

According to PIAA directory July 2016
