= Turkey Run (West Branch Susquehanna River tributary) =

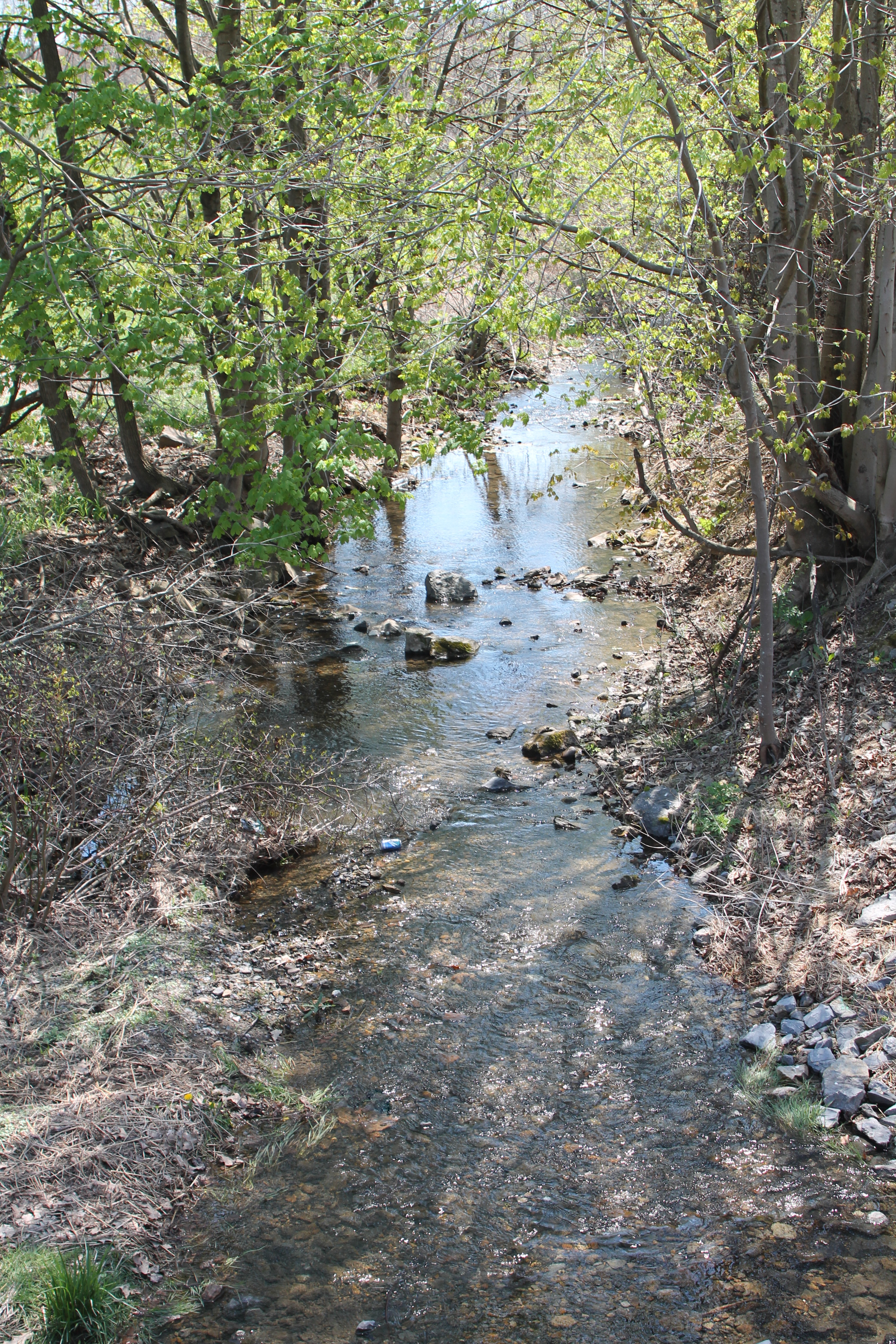
- Turkey Run looking downstream

Physical characteristics
- Source
  - location: base of a large mountain in Clinton Township, Lycoming County, Pennsylvania
  - elevation: 596 ft (182 m)
- Mouth
  - location: West Branch Susquehanna River in Clinton Township, Lycoming County, Pennsylvania near Seagers
  - coordinates: 41°10′56″N 76°49′08″W
  - elevation: 459 ft (140 m)
- Length: 2.2 mi (3.5 km)
- Basin size: 2.18 sq mi (5.6 km^{2})

Basin features
- Progression: West Branch Susquehanna River → Susquehanna River → Chesapeake Bay

Turkey Run is a tributary of the West Branch Susquehanna River in Lycoming County, Pennsylvania, in the United States. It is approximately 2.2 miles (3.5 km) long and flows through Clinton Township. The watershed of the stream has an area of 2.18 square miles (5.6 km^{2}). The stream is not designated as an impaired waterbody. It is a relatively small stream and is located near State Correctional Institution – Muncy. The stream's watershed is designated as a Warmwater Fishery and a Migratory Fishery.

== Course ==
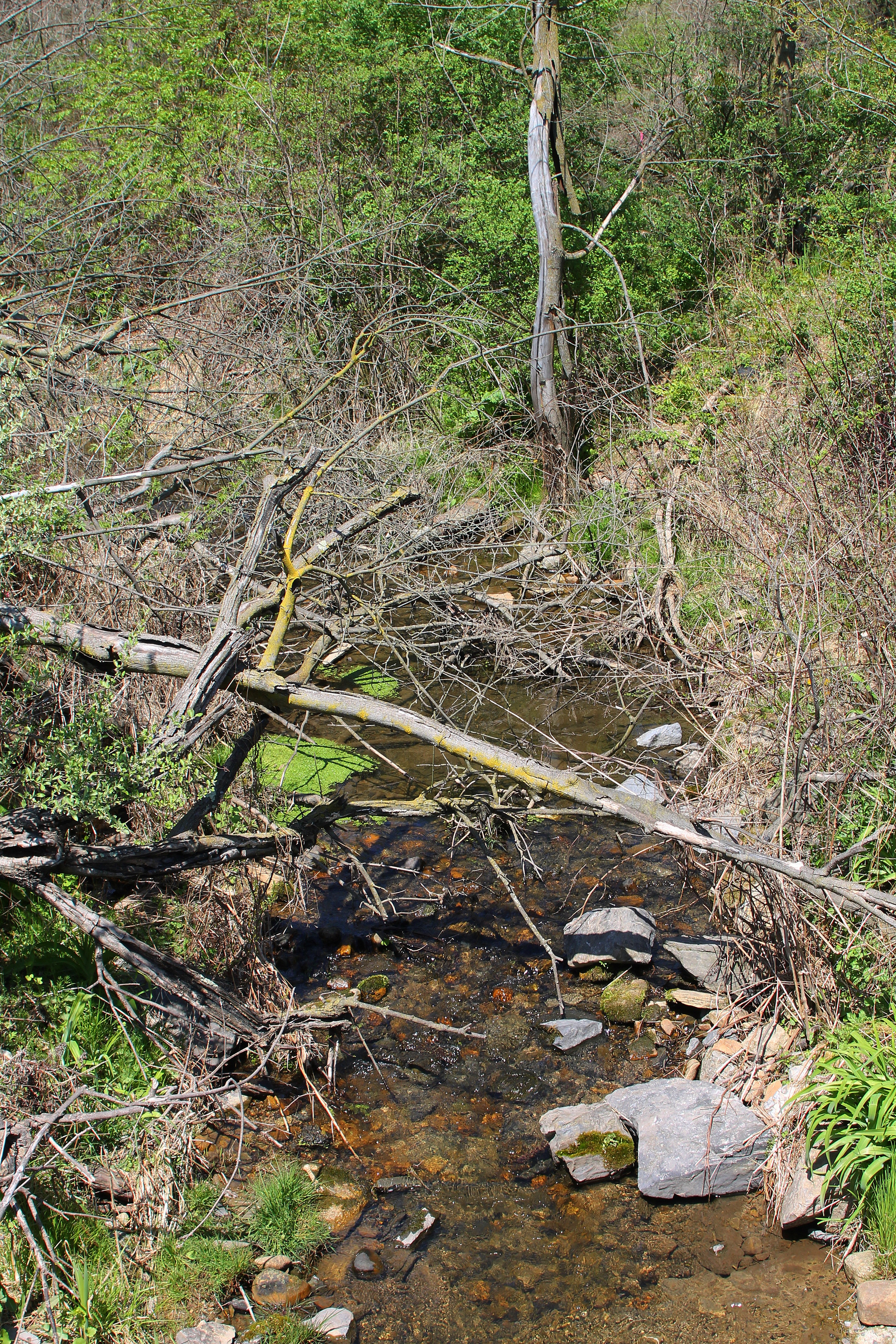
Turkey Run looking upstream

Turkey Run begins at the base of a large mountain in Clinton Township. It flows east for a few tenths of a mile before turning south and passing through a small pond. After a few tenths of a mile, the stream turns southeast for several tenths of a mile, passing through another small pond, crossing Pennsylvania Route 405, and crossing railroad tracks. It then turns south-southwest for several tenths of a mile before reaching its confluence with the West Branch Susquehanna River.

Turkey Run joins the West Branch Susquehanna River 25.64 miles (41.26 km) upstream of its mouth.

== Hydrology ==
Turkey Run is not designated as an impaired waterbody.

== Geography and geology ==
The elevation near the mouth of Turkey Run is 459 feet (140 m) above sea level. The elevation of the stream's source is 596 feet (182 m) above sea level.

Turkey Run was described as a "small stream" in an 1892 book of Lycoming County history. The stream is in a region known as the Black Hole Valley, along with Black Hole Creek.

== Watershed ==
The watershed of Turkey Run has an area of 2.18 square miles (5.6 km^{2}). The stream is entirely within the United States Geological Survey quadrangle of Muncy. Its mouth is located within 1 mile (1.6 km) of Seagers.

The designated use for Turkey Run is aquatic life. The stream is not far from Williamsport, but is on the opposite bank of the West Branch Susquehanna River. The State Correctional Institution Muncy is located near the headwaters of Turkey Run.

== History ==
Turkey Run was entered into the Geographic Names Information System on August 2, 1979. Its identifier in the Geographic Names Information System is 1189947.

Peter Smith had a farm on Turkey Run by 1778. His wife and children were killed in July 1778. In August of that year, a group of soldiers and militia were sent to the farm to protect people helping Smith harvest his crop. Turkey Run provided power to gristmills and sawmills in the early days of settlement in the stream's vicinity.

A bridge carrying Pennsylvania Route 405 crosses Turkey Run. In 2013, an $85,000 bridge replacement was planned for 2014 to 2016. Turkey Run Partners once applied for and/or received a National Pollutant Discharge Elimination System permit to discharge stormwater into the stream during construction activities.

== Biology ==
The drainage basin of Turkey Run is designated as a Warmwater Fishery and a Migratory Fishery. In the 1970s, the stream was described as being "moderately depressed" downstream of the State Correctional Institute Muncy.

== See also ==
- Black Hole Creek, next tributary of the West Branch Susquehanna River going downriver
- Glade Run, next tributary of the West Branch Susquehanna River going upriver
- List of rivers of Pennsylvania
