= Sharon Wiggins =

American criminal

Sharon Margaret Wiggins
- Born: c. 1950/1951; United States
- Died: March 24, 2013 (aged 62); Bethane Unit State Correctional Institution - Muncy, Pennsylvania, US
- Conviction: Bank robbery
- Penalty: Death (1969), commuted to a life sentence without parole (1971)

Details
- Country: United States
- State: Pennsylvania

Sharon Margaret Wiggins, nicknamed "Peachie", was an American woman, who was the longest incarcerated female serving juvenile life without parole in the world.

== Bank robbery ==
At the age of 17, Wiggins, along with her two co-defendants Foster Tarver, age 17, and Samuel Barlow, age 18, planned to rob the Dauphin Deposit Bank in Dauphin, Pennsylvania, on December 2, 1968. Barlow was in the stolen get-away car; armed, Wiggins and Foster entered the bank. Wiggins was positioned at the front door hidden behind a tall plant while Tarver went deeper into the bank. George Morelock, a customer, entered the bank unaware that a robbery had commenced. Morelock wrestled with Wiggins to stop the robbery and her gun went off twice. Tarver ran over and shot Morelock again. Wiggins and Tarver fled the bank, got into the car, and were quickly apprehended when Barlow lost control of the car while police fired.

== Sentencing and incarceration ==
In 1969 Wiggins, Tarver, and Barlow were sentenced to death. In 1971 all three had their sentences commuted to life without the possibility of parole.

At that time in 1969, there were no women at SCI Muncy serving a death sentence, and so Wiggins was confined to the restricted housing unit, the Clinton Building, behind the main property. SCI Muncy had no fence or wall securing the facility until 1985; as a result, many women walked away. Muncy had the highest rate of all Pennsylvania state prisons for escapes prior to the wall and fence being erected. Wiggins walked away twice during her first ten years of her life sentence. In 1973 while attending Williamsport Community College, she walked away. While on escape status for about 30 days, she turned herself in to authorities. In 1975 she walked away from the institution and was on escape status for three years.

In 1983, Wiggins filed a class action lawsuit with other female prisoners at Muncy, which led to the opening of a law clinic at the facility as well as other reforms. In addition to the lack of law clinic (a standard resource at men's prisons), the suit also alleged that Muncy's vocational, educational, medical, rehabilitative, and psychological services were inferior, and that the prison was unsafe, due to fire hazards and asbestos. A prison counselor, Nancy Sponeybarger, later described Wiggins's positive contributions to the incarcerated community as a peer counselor, tutor, and mediator. Sponeybarger continued to visit Wiggins even after leaving her job at Muncy.

Wiggins was the first graduate of Penn State University's continuing education program at SCI Muncy. Later she worked for PSU as an administrator and student liaison for the Muncy program. The Pennsylvania Department of Corrections allowed this arrangement since Wiggins agreed to pay for her "room and board" expenses from her salary while serving her life sentence. It is believed that she is the only prisoner in the US to be afforded this opportunity under those conditions.

In 2009 the Pennsylvania Prison Society named Wiggins Prisoner of the Year, "in recognition of her constant efforts to improve the world around her, of the hope which she ignites in others and the positive and effective leadership she provides."

Wiggins applied for commutation 13 times; the last application was filed shortly before her death. Her co-defendant Tarver was paroled in June 2018. Barlow was granted clemency in March 2019.

== Death and legacy ==
Wiggins died of heart problems on March 24, 2013, at the age of 62 in her Bethune Unit cell at the State Correctional Institution at Muncy in Pennsylvania. She is buried at Gethsemane Cemetery in Detroit, Michigan. A memorial and tribute was held for her in Philadelphia, Pennsylvania, in June 2013, hosted by The Pennsylvania Coalition for The Fair Sentencing of Youth and organized by attorney Emily Keller of the Juvenile Law Center and Ellen Melchiondo, an official visitor with the Pennsylvania Prison Society.

After Wiggins' death, Melchiondo donated a collection of biographical material, correspondence, interviews, and writings from incarcerated and formerly incarcerated women about Wiggins. In 2015, The Sharon Peachie Wiggins Biographical Materials archive was established at Penn State University, in University Park, Pennsylvania.
