= Mary Jane Fonder =

American murderer

- Born: July 5, 1942; Philadelphia, Pennsylvania, U.S.
- Died: June 4, 2018 (aged 75); State Correctional Institution – Muncy, Muncy, Pennsylvania, U.S.
- Parent(s): Edward and Alice Fonder
- Status: Deceased
- Motive: Jealousy
- Conviction: First degree murder
- Penalty: Life imprisonment

Details
- Victims: Rhonda Smith
- Country: United States
- State: Pennsylvania

Mary Jane Fonder (July 5, 1942 – June 4, 2018) was an American criminal who murdered Rhonda Smith, a fellow congregant, inside their church in Bucks County, Pennsylvania in 2008. Fonder had also been the prime suspect in the possible homicide of her father, Edward Fonder III, who disappeared in 1993.

== Early life ==
Fonder was born on July 5, 1942, to Alice and Edward Fonder III of Philadelphia, Pennsylvania. Fonder and her brother, Edward Fonder IV, grew up in West Philadelphia, where their father was a machinist and their mother was a proofreader. Fonder experienced emotional problems during her childhood, beginning with a "nervous breakdown" at eight years old. Her family purchased a second home in Springfield Township, a small rural township in Delaware County, Pennsylvania, when she was twelve.

Fonder attended John Bartram High School in Philadelphia, but had difficulty with her schoolwork due to emotional issues, and was institutionalized for one month at age sixteen after attempting suicide by overdosing on chloral hydrate. Shortly after, Fonder dropped out of high school, finding social interactions increasingly difficult.

Fonder worked various jobs during her early adulthood, including at a ceramics studio, a department store, various knitting factories, and the J. B. Lippincott & Co. publishing company, where she was a punchcard operator. Fonder did not start dating until her late thirties and never formed any serious romantic relationships. In 1987, at age 45, Fonder moved back to the family's country home in Springfield to care for her aging parents. In 1992, her mother had a leg amputated due to circulation problems, but fell into coma due to complications from the surgery eventually dying four months later.

== Father's disappearance ==
Edward Fonder III became depressed after his wife's death and began fighting with his daughter more often. Mary Jane Fonder later claimed their relationship became damaged beyond repair after two of Edward's elderly cousins visited from the Philadelphia area and harshly criticized how Mary Jane ate chicken.

On August 26, 1993, the 80-year-old Edward Fonder III disappeared from the Springfield Township residence he shared with his daughter. Mary Jane Fonder claimed she had heard the front door open while lying in bed that morning and believed her father was stepping outside to get the newspaper. Fonder claimed she went back to sleep and, after waking up at around 11:00 a.m., found that her father had disappeared. Fonder contacted the police and unsuccessfully searched for her father with the assistance of neighbors. Township police were suspicious of Fonder's claims that her father had wandered off, partially because the elderly man had trouble moving by himself and had no money or access to his medication.

Mary Jane Fonder became the prime suspect in the possible homicide of her father. The investigation was led by Springfield Township police officer Kimberly Triol. During one interview in Fonder's home, Triol discovered a bucket filled with pinkish water along with towels, a mop, and a chicken. She also found the corpse of a dog wrapped in plastic inside Fonder's freezer; it had been given a lethal dose of diabetes medication. Fonder also displayed a Taser gun in a non-threatening manner to Triol during one of their interviews.

Fonder initially cooperated with police in their investigation, but ceased contact with them after she perceived Triol had attempted to elicit a confession from her. In February 1994, about six months after her father's disappearance, Fonder voiced her displeasure with police tactics, claiming they had forced her to hire a lawyer and to ban police from her property.

== Murder of Rhonda Smith ==
On January 23, 2008, 42-year-old Rhonda Smith was shot as she did temporary work in the office of Trinity Evangelical Lutheran Church in Springfield Township. Smith, shot twice in the head, died at a hospital after being disconnected from life support.

Fonder, then 65 years old, became a suspect early on in the investigation after the church's pastor told police about Fonder's history of inappropriate behavior, which included leaving rambling voicemail messages for him and surreptitiously placing food in his kitchen without his knowledge or consent.

According to police and prosecutors, Fonder had called the church on the day of the murder and discovered that Smith would be alone in the church's office that day. Fonder, who often wore a wig, kept an appointment to have her natural hair washed and styled after shooting Smith and left her wig at the hair salon, where police later retrieved it.

On April 1, 2008, Fonder was arrested for Smith's murder, some weeks after fishermen found a .38 caliber revolver on the shore of Lake Nockamixon. During police questioning, Fonder had already admitted to having purchased and registered a .38; she claimed to have thrown it into Lake Nockamixon in 1994, though she gave police two different reasons for having done so. Forensic testing found that the recovered gun and ammunition had been placed in the lake much more recently, contradicting Fonder's claims. The gun found was registered to Fonder and had been used to kill Smith. The 1993 disappearance of Fonder's father was revisited in conjunction with the homicide investigation.

Fonder's trial began on October 21, 2008. Prosecutors argued that Fonder, a member of the Trinity Evangelical Lutheran Church for 14 years, was jealous of new member Smith, who had received sympathetic attention and some financial assistance from the church's pastor and congregants. Fonder's defense attorney told the court that his client was not present at the scene of the crime and did not shoot Rhonda Smith. Fonder's attorney further argued that Smith's death might have been suicide, or a homicide committed by a jealous wife or a lover. During closing arguments, Fonder's attorney told the jury that Mary Jane's brother, Edward Fonder IV, was also a likely suspect, pointing out that he had hired a lawyer after finding bullet fragments in his car and notifying police.

On October 30, 2008, a jury found Fonder guilty of first-degree murder and possession of an instrument of crime. On December 5, 2008, she was sentenced to serve life in prison. At her sentencing hearing, Fonder made the following statement:

I did not kill Rhonda Smith—I thought she was a lovely girl. and I certainly wasn't jealous of this woman for any reason. I'm so sorry she's gone, but in the same respect, I will be gone, too. I'm the second person in the church to be murdered, by the system.

In February 2010, Fonder dropped her appeal against the conviction.

== Death ==
On June 4, 2018, Fonder died of cardiac arrest at State Correctional Institution – Muncy in Lycoming County, Pennsylvania.
