= Frank E. Heller Dam =

- Interactive map of Frank E. Heller Dam
- Location: Armstrong Township, Lycoming County, Pennsylvania
- Coordinates: 41.1921°N 76.9985°W
- Status: Operational
- Construction began: 1972
- Opening date: 1975
- Owners: Williamsport Municipal Water Authority and Pennsylvania American Water
- Operators: Williamsport Municipal Water Authority and Pennsylvania American Water

Dam and spillways
- Impounds: Hagerman's Run
- Length: 195 ft
- Elevation at crest: 1,355 ft MSL (413 m)
- Spillways: 2
- Spillway type: Side channel and chute

Reservoir
- Creates: Hagerman Reservoir

The Frank E. Heller Dam is an embankment dam that impounds Hagerman's Run and creates the Hagerman Reservoir that supplies water for Lycoming County, Pennsylvania. It is owned by the Williamsport Municipal Water Authority and Pennsylvania-American Water Company. Opened in 1975 it is located in Armstrong Township in southern Lycoming County.

== History ==
Construction of the dam began in 1972 and was completed in 1975. With population of Williamsport and the county rising, the Williamsport Municipal Water Authority was in need of expansion. The expansion added 530 million gallons to the storage capacity.

=== Danger of breach ===
In August 2019, engineers found signs of fatigue in the dams base and had failed its inspection. A water authority spokesperson said the dam is "highly likely to have a complete failure in the next five to ten years". Its estimated over 2,600 people as well as hundreds of homes and businesses would be at risk if the dam were to fail. Economic costs could to be at over $22 million. The Williamsport Municipal Water Authority has submitted an emergency grant request of $221,357 in preliminary engineering funds to the Federal Emergency Management Agency and hopes to receive approval by September 30.
