= Black Hole Creek =

Stream in Lycoming County, Pennsylvania

Coordinates: 41.1569°N 76.8847°W

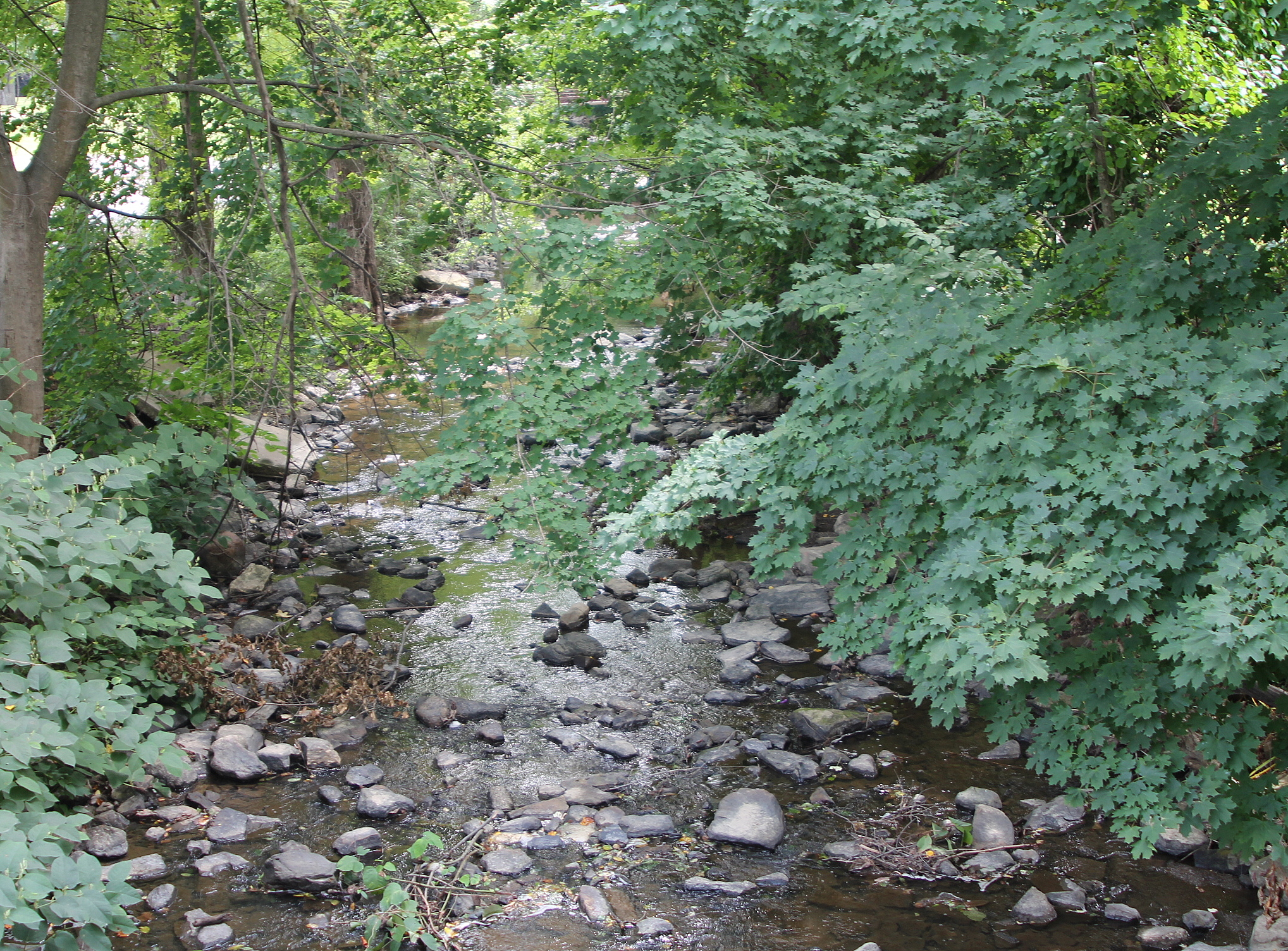
Black Hole Creek in Montgomery, Pennsylvania

Black Hole Creek is a tributary of the West Branch Susquehanna River near Montgomery, in Lycoming County, Pennsylvania, in the United States. It is approximately 8 miles (13 km) long. The stream contains trout. It also is subject to significant increases in temperature downstream of a pond on the grounds of the Allenwood Federal Prison. However, the temperature decreases again after reaching the pond and is somewhat lower at the mouth, but the water at this point is still warmer than at the headwaters.

== Course ==
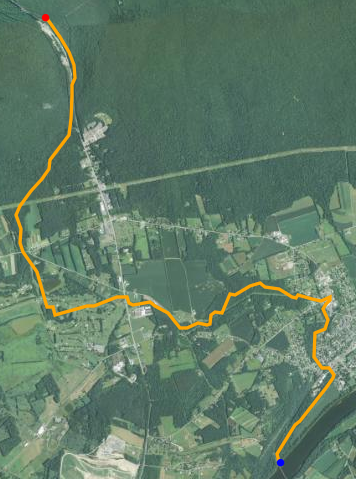
Satellite map of Black Hole Creek. The red dot is the stream's source and blue dot is its mouth.Data available from U.S. Geological Survey, National Geospatial Program.

Black Hole Creek starts near U.S. Route 15. The first one third of the creek flows through forests. The second one third of the creek flows through a golf course. The final one third of the creek flows through residential areas and farmland.

Black Hole Creek has three major tributaries. It also has an additional seven non-permanent tributaries and fifteen ephemeral ones. One of these tributaries is known as Spring Creek.

According to an 1888 magazine article, Black Hole Creek flows from a geological feature then known as the Black Hole.

== Watershed and hydrology ==
A total of 18 bridges cross Black Hole Creek. There are also 20 pipes that flow into or run under the creek. The creek has two small dams that are made of rock. There is also an earthen dam on Black Hole Creek near the Allenwood Federal Prison. The presence of this dam raises the water temperature of the creek. A culvert on the prison grounds that is obstructed also contributes to an increase in the water temperature. As of 2003, there are also 15 instances of rip rap and 36 deposition bars. A 2003 study found that there were 98 potential sites for erosion on the creek.

In the 1980s or 1990s, the White Deer Golf Course was expanded. During the expansion, a number of culverts were created, which led to the formation of a pond with brown water. This pond flows into Black Hole Creek. There is also a pond near the Allenwood Federal Prison, which flows into the creek, drastically increasing its water temperature.

In July 2005, the water temperature of Black Hole Creek was measured in several locations. At the headwaters, the temperature was 66.6 °F (19.2 °C). At the area where the prison pond discharges into the creek, the temperature was 80.6 °F (27.0 °C). However, further downstream, the temperature was only 71.6 °F (22.0 °C). The temperature was measured at the same locations again in April 2010. At the headwaters, it was 52.5 °F (11.4 °C), at the prison pond it was 65.2 °F (18.4 °C), and at a point further downstream, it was 59.2 °F (15.1 °C).

== History ==
The Sheshequin Path once passed near Spring Creek, a tributary of Black Hole Creek. In 1889, Black Hole Creek flooded drastically and unexpectedly, causing significant damage to the Montgomery borough. The creek appeared in a map of the area as early as 1779.

Historically, Black Hole Creek served as a sewer to the residents of the community of Montgomery. As late as 1913, a number of sewers discharged into the creek. One of these sewers was the Board Street Sewer. This sewer was 2,400 feet (730 m) long and contained an 8 inches (20 cm) to 15 inches (38 cm) pipe. Another sewer ran under Montgomery Street. Slightly upstream of it, there was a group of approximately 30 private sewers whose diameters were 4 inches (10 cm) to 8 inches (20 cm). There were also two more sewers in western Montgomery. One of these was 500 feet (150 m) in length and 6 inches (15 cm) in diameter. It served six houses and discharged into Black Hole Creek at West Houston Avenue. The other was 1,000 feet (300 m) in length and 18 inches (46 cm) in diameter.

Until 1905, Black Hole Creek was the source of the water supply of the borough of Montgomery.

=== Name ===
Black Hole Creek was originally known as Black Haw Creek.

== Fauna and flora ==
Black Hole Creek is well-stocked with trout. The headwaters of the creek have a riparian buffer. Plants in the riparian buffer include speckled alder, which was placed there by the Black Hole Creek Watershed Association, and Lobelia cardinalis, which grows there naturally.

== See also ==
- Black Run (West Branch Susquehanna River), next tributary of the West Branch Susquehanna River going downriver
- Turkey Run (West Branch Susquehanna River), next tributary of the West Branch Susquehanna River going upriver
- List of rivers of Pennsylvania
