= Armstrong Township, Lycoming County, Pennsylvania =

Township in Pennsylvania, US

- Township
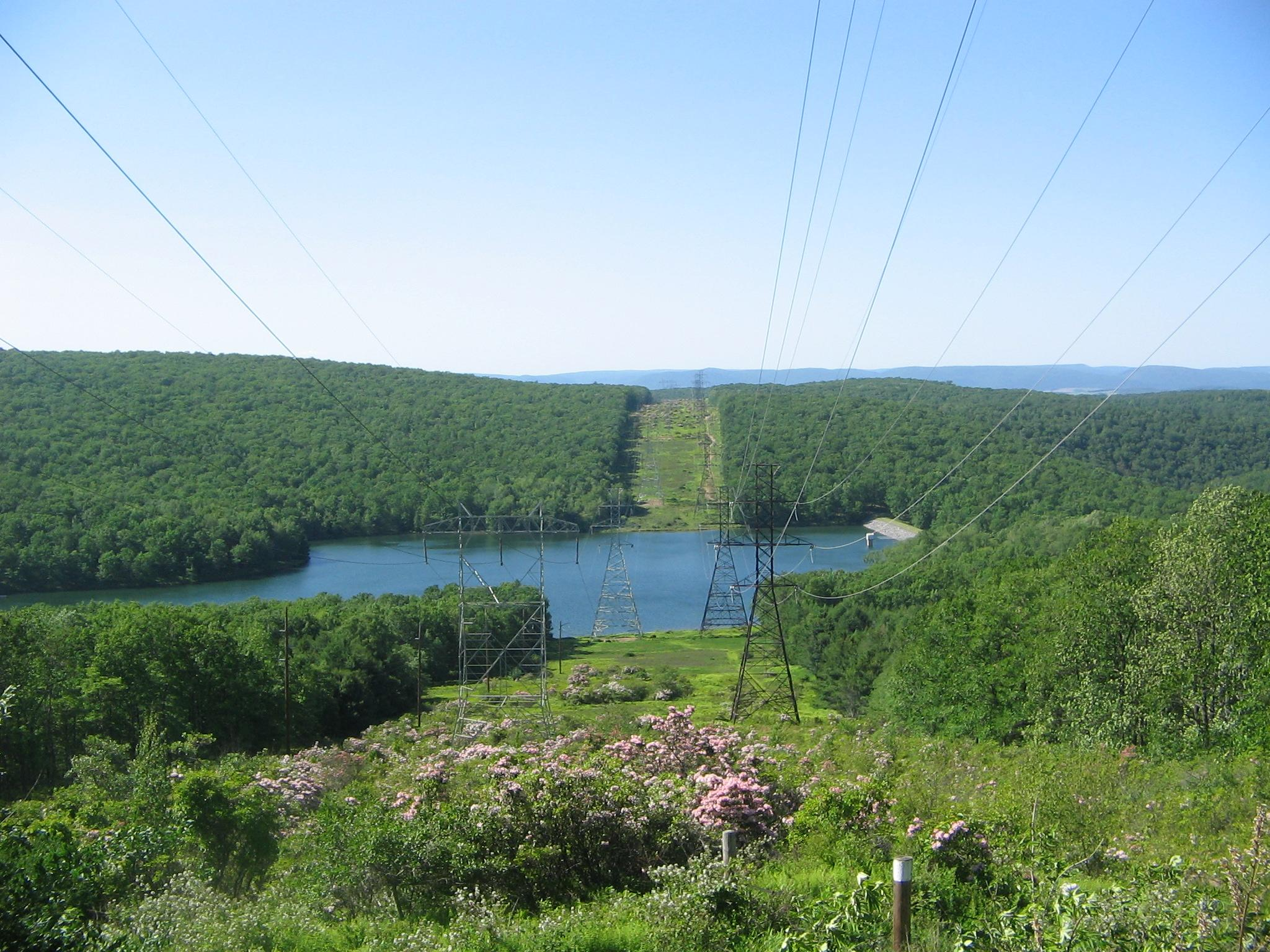
- Hagermans Run Reservoir from PA Route 554, Armstrong Township

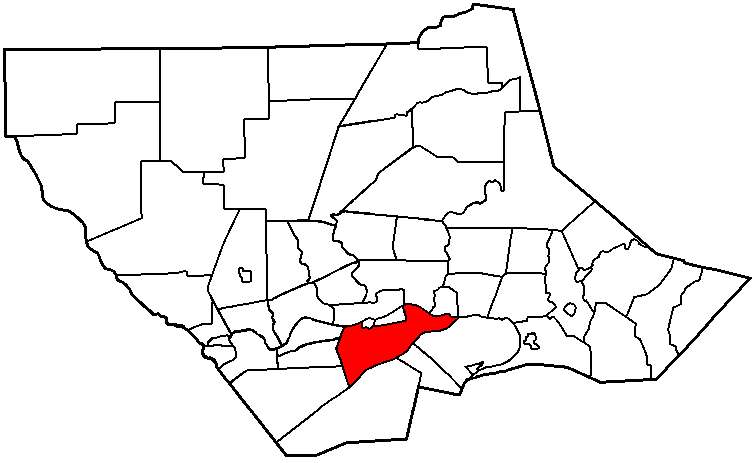
- Map of Lycoming County, Pennsylvania highlighting Armstrong Township

- Map of Lycoming County, Pennsylvania
- Coordinates: 41°12′17″N 77°1′48″W
- Country: United States
- State: Pennsylvania
- County: Lycoming
- Settled: 1795
- Formed: 1842

Area
  - Total: 25.51 sq mi (66.06 km^{2})
  - Land: 24.75 sq mi (64.09 km^{2})
  - Water: 0.76 sq mi (1.97 km^{2}) 2.11%
- Elevation: 1,909 ft (582 m)

Population (2020)
  - Total: 685 ▲
  - Estimate (2021): 679
  - Density: 28.3/sq mi (10.94/km^{2})
- Time zone: UTC-5 (Eastern Time Zone (North America))
  - Summer (DST): UTC-4 (EDT)
- ZIP code: 17702
- Area code: 570
- FIPS code: 42-081-03072
- GNIS feature ID: 1216739
- Website: www.armstrongtownship.org

Armstrong Township is a township in Lycoming County, Pennsylvania, United States. The population was 685 at the 2020 census. It is part of the Williamsport, Pennsylvania Metropolitan Statistical Area.

== History ==
The first European settlers arrived in Armstrong Township in 1773. Thomas Hartley, Michael Graybill, George Leffler, and John Kern all received warrants for land on February 11, 1773. Hartley then purchased the properties of Graybill, Leffler and Kern on March 31, 1773. This was to avoid a Province of Pennsylvania law that stated that no one man could purchase more than one tract of land. Marcus Huling appears to have been the first permanent settler in Mosquito Valley, which makes up the greatest portion of Armstrong Township. Huling settled in the eastern portion of Mosquito Valley, near where Culbertson's Path crossed. Huling and family cleared land and built a cabin, a sawmill, and distillery in 1795. Huling's son, Thomas, carried on the family businesses until his death. Although the Hulings were apparently successful businessmen, they never saw fit to settle their debt on the land that they had developed. Upon Thomas Huling's death, the land was foreclosed upon and left to be reclaimed by nature until the arrival of German farmers in 1832.

Armstrong Township was formed from part of Clinton Township in 1842. It is named in honor of James Armstrong, a prominent lawyer. The boroughs of South Williamsport and DuBoistown were formed subsequently from it.

Mosquito Valley was cleared by the lumber companies that made nearby Williamsport the "Lumber Capital of the World." Lumberjacks harvested the old-growth forests of white pine and hemlock. They then floated the logs down Mosquito Run to the sawmills close to the mouth of the creek. Farmers moved into the area and began several successful orchard and dairy operations after the valley was cleared of trees.

Armstrong Township is not limited to Mosquito Valley alone. Bald Eagle Mountain runs through the northernmost portions of it. From this ridge, several mountain streams find their source. The lumber barons from Williamsport flocked to Mosquito Run in the south and western sections of the township and to Hagermans Run in the eastern portion of the township. The barons built summer cottages on both streams, fished for trout in the waters, and built small dams for recreational swimming and ice skating. They also built several trout hatcheries in Mosquito Valley.

The Williamsport Municipal Water Authority saw the value of the fresh water that was in abundant supply in both Mosquito and Hagermans runs. It acquired water rights to the streams and bought up most of the farmland in the southwestern portion of Armstrong Township in the early 1920s as part of its watershed. Visitors to the "water company" lands can see the stone remains of the early settlers homesteads spread throughout the watershed. This mass purchase of farmland in Armstrong County and the ceding of territory to neighboring boroughs has accounted for the steep decline in population since 1890. Mosquito Run and Hagerman's Run continue to supply drinking water for Williamsport and surrounding communities.

The water authority built a multimillion-dollar water filtration plant in the 1990s in Mosquito Valley. With the construction of this plant the lands of the water authority were opened as a nature preserve to the general public.

== Geography ==
Armstrong Township is bordered by Duboistown, South Williamsport, and the West Branch Susquehanna River to the north (with Williamsport, Loyalsock Township, and Montoursville north of the river), Brady and Clinton townships to the south and east, Washington Township to the south, and Limestone, Bastress and Susquehanna townships to the west.

Bald Eagle Mountain is in the northern part of the township, and the crest of North White Deer Ridge forms the southern border. The two ridges join in the eastern part of the township at an unnamed 2,000-foot (610 m) summit. Mosquito Valley is in the western part of the township, between the two ridges, and Mosquito Creek exits the valley by cutting north through Bald Eagle Mountain and entering Duboistown before reaching the West Branch of the Susquehanna. Hagermans Run is east of the center of the township, with Hagerman Lake, a public water supply, near the run's headwaters at the north base of North White Deer Ridge. Like Mosquito Creek, Hagermans Run cuts north through Bald Eagle Mountain, but passes through South Williamsport before reaching the West Branch.

U.S. Route 15 passes through the eastern side of Armstrong Township, leading north 4 miles (6 km) to Williamsport and south 19 miles (31 km) to Lewisburg. The township is 80 miles (130 km) north of Harrisburg, the state capital. Pennsylvania Route 554 runs through the Hagermans Run valley, leading north to South Williamsport and Williamsport, and south over North White Deer Ridge 8 miles (13 km) to Elimsport in Washington Township.

According to the United States Census Bureau, Armstrong Township has a total area of 25.5 square miles (66.1 km^{2}). 24.7 square miles (64.1 km^{2}) of it are land, and 0.77 square miles (2.0 km^{2}) of it (2.98%) are water.

== Demographics ==
Historical population
Census	Pop.	Note	%±
2000	717		—
2010	681		−5.0%
2020	685		0.6%
2021 (est.)	679		−0.9%
U.S. Decennial Census

As of the census of 2000, there were 717 people, 294 households, and 204 families residing in the township. The population density was 28.6 inhabitants per square mile (11.0/km^{2}). There were 334 housing units at an average density of 13.3/sq mi (5.2/km^{2}). The racial makeup of the township was 99.30% White, 0.42% African American, 0.14% Native American, and 0.14% from two or more races. Hispanic or Latino of any race were 0.28% of the population.

There were 294 households, out of which 28.6% had children under the age of 18 living with them, 56.8% were married couples living together, 8.8% had a female householder with no husband present, and 30.6% were non-families. 25.9% of all households were made up of individuals, and 10.5% had someone living alone who was 65 years of age or older. The average household size was 2.44 and the average family size was 2.93.

In the township the population was spread out, with 23.3% under the age of 18, 4.6% from 18 to 24, 28.7% from 25 to 44, 28.7% from 45 to 64, and 14.6% who were 65 years of age or older. The median age was 42 years. For every 100 females there were 97.0 males. For every 100 females age 18 and over, there were 97.8 males.

The median income for a household in the township was $34,844, and the median income for a family was $42,031. Males had a median income of $32,188 versus $21,417 for females. The per capita income for the township was $18,423. About 6.5% of families and 9.4% of the population were below the poverty line, including 13.6% of those under age 18 and 3.4% of those age 65 or over.

== See also ==
- Frank E. Heller Dam
