= Eagle Grange No. 1 =

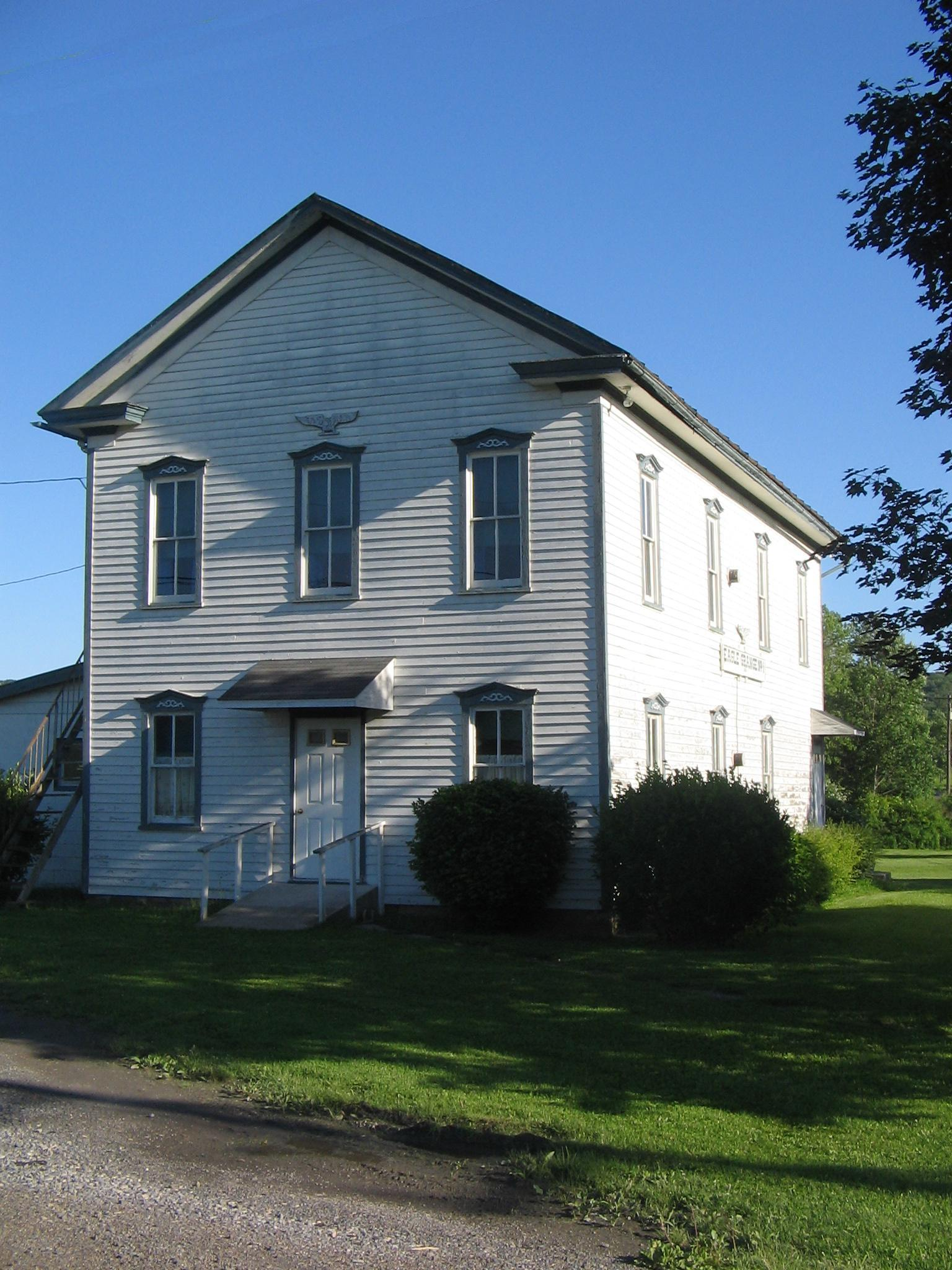
- Eagle Grange, the first in Pennsylvania

- Location within Pennsylvania
- 41.1788°N 76.9111°W
- Location: Clinton Township, Lycoming County, Pennsylvania, USA
- Nearest city: Williamsport, Pennsylvania

History
- Built: 1871

Site notes
- Area: May 5, 2001

Eagle Grange No. 1 was organized on March 4, 1871 by a group of rural farmers who had become concerned about the rising costs of farming in the post Civil War economy. It is in Clinton Township, Lycoming County, Pennsylvania in the United States. Eagle Grange No. 1 was the first grange to be organized in Pennsylvania, two years before the formation of the Pennsylvania State Grange and four years after The National Grange of the Order of Patrons of Husbandry, better known as the National Grange was founded in Fredonia, New York by Oliver Hudson Kelley. The chief objectives of the Eagle Grange No. 1 were the establishment of a co-operative purchasing program for farmers, the lowering of railroad rates, and the establishment of rural free delivery by the United States Postal Service. The Grange was one of the first national organizations to give equal status to female members.

Luke Eger, a farmer from Lycoming County, was the driving force behind the formation of Eagle Grange No. 1. He had read about the success of similar farmer's co-operative groups in states like Ohio, Iowa, and Minnesota. Eger contacted Oliver Hudson Kelley who was working for farmer's rights in Washington, D.C. at the time. Kelley encouraged Eger to establish a Grange in Lycoming County. Eger received little support from his friends and neighbors when he first attempted to establish a co-operative. In fact his brother-in-law, Frank Porter, is quoted in saying that Eagle Grange No. 1 was finally established, "just to keep peace in the family." Luke Eger wrote to the National Grange in 1871, "I have at last succeeded in organizing and raising a club here and think there will be little trouble in establishing clubs in the county."

Luke Eger and 39 other farmers began Eagle Grange No. 1 on March 4, 1871 at the base of Bald Eagle Mountain in southern Lycoming County. They quickly set about reaching their goals. One of their most important goals was to set up a plan of co-operative purchasing farming supplies to drive down the prices. Merchants that refused to do business with the co-op were summarily boycotted by the members of the Grange. The farmers from Lycoming County also sought to have the rates charged to them by the railroads lowered and they pushed for rural free delivery from the Post Office. Eger and the other members of Eagle Grange No. 1 were quickly successful in establishing themselves as a force with which to be reckoned.

The Pennsylvania State Grange was established on September 18, 1873 in Reading. Representatives from 22 local Granges met on Blenizer's Hall and elected the man who said that the first Pennsylvania Grange was established to "keep the peace in the family", Frank Porter, as the first Overseer of the Pennsylvania State Grange. The Grange Hall was built in 1887.
