= Glade Run =

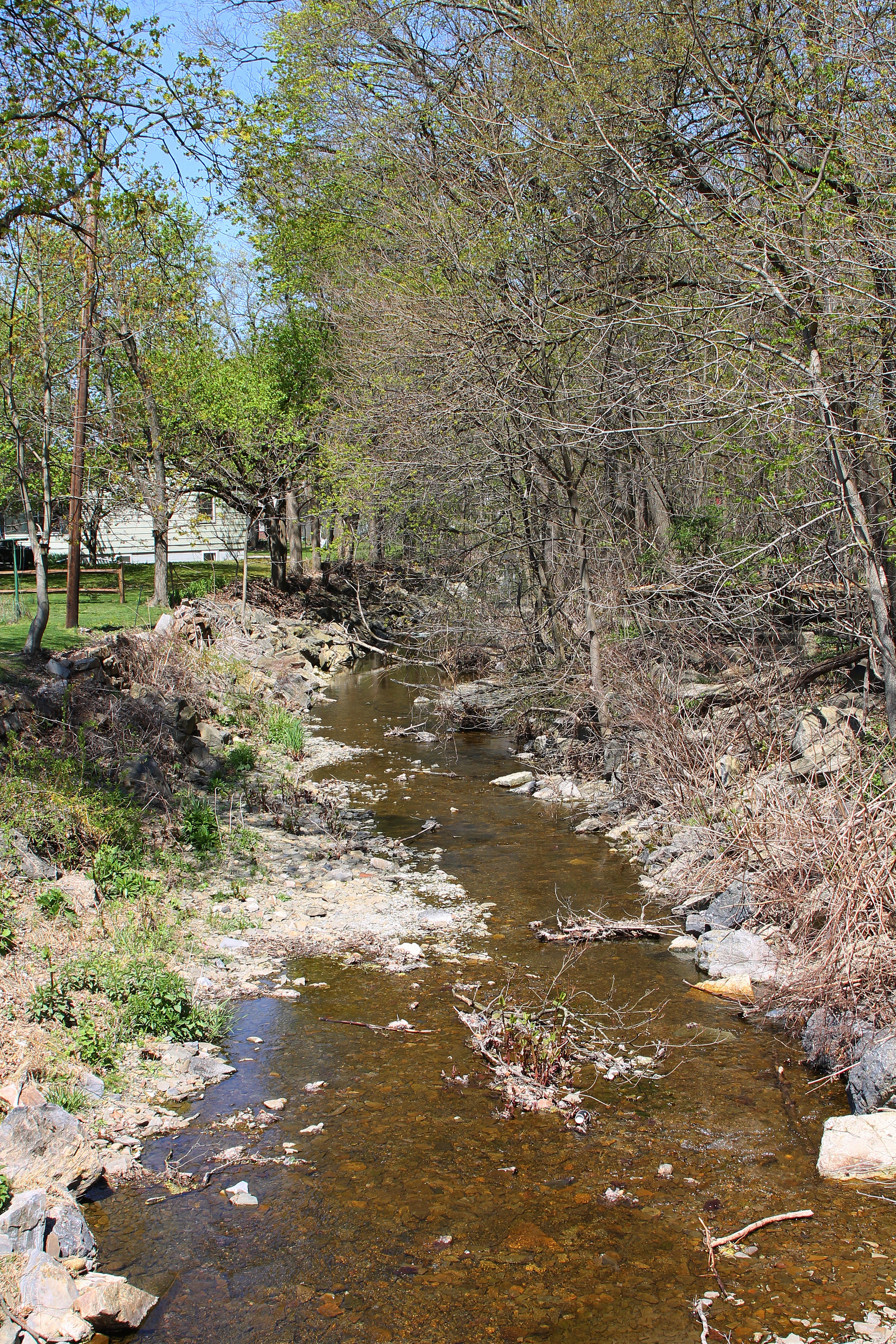
- Glade Run looking downstream in Muncy
- Etymology: glades on the stream's course

Physical characteristics
- Source
  - location: valley in Lewis Township, Northumberland County, Pennsylvania
  - elevation: 889 ft (271 m)
- Mouth
  - location: West Branch Susquehanna River in Muncy Creek Township, Northumberland County, Pennsylvania
  - coordinates: 41°12′25″N 76°48′07″W
  - elevation: 476 ft (145 m)
- Length: 6.5 mi (10.5 km)
- Basin size: 7.63 mi^{2} (19.8 km^{2})

Basin features
- Progression: West Branch Susquehanna River → Susquehanna River → Chesapeake Bay
- Tributaries
  - left: four unnamed tributaries
  - right: two unnamed tributaries

Glade Run is a tributary of the West Branch Susquehanna River in Northumberland County and Lycoming County, in Pennsylvania, in the United States. It is approximately 6.5 miles (10.5 km) long and flows through Lewis Township in Northumberland County and Muncy Creek Township and Muncy in Lycoming County. The watershed of the stream has an area of 7.63 square miles (19.8 km^{2}). The stream is not designated as an impaired waterbody. An Indian path known as the Wyoming Path was historically in the stream's vicinity. More recently, a number of bridges have been constructed over Glade Run. The stream's watershed is designated as a Warmwater Fishery and a Migratory Fishery.

== Course ==
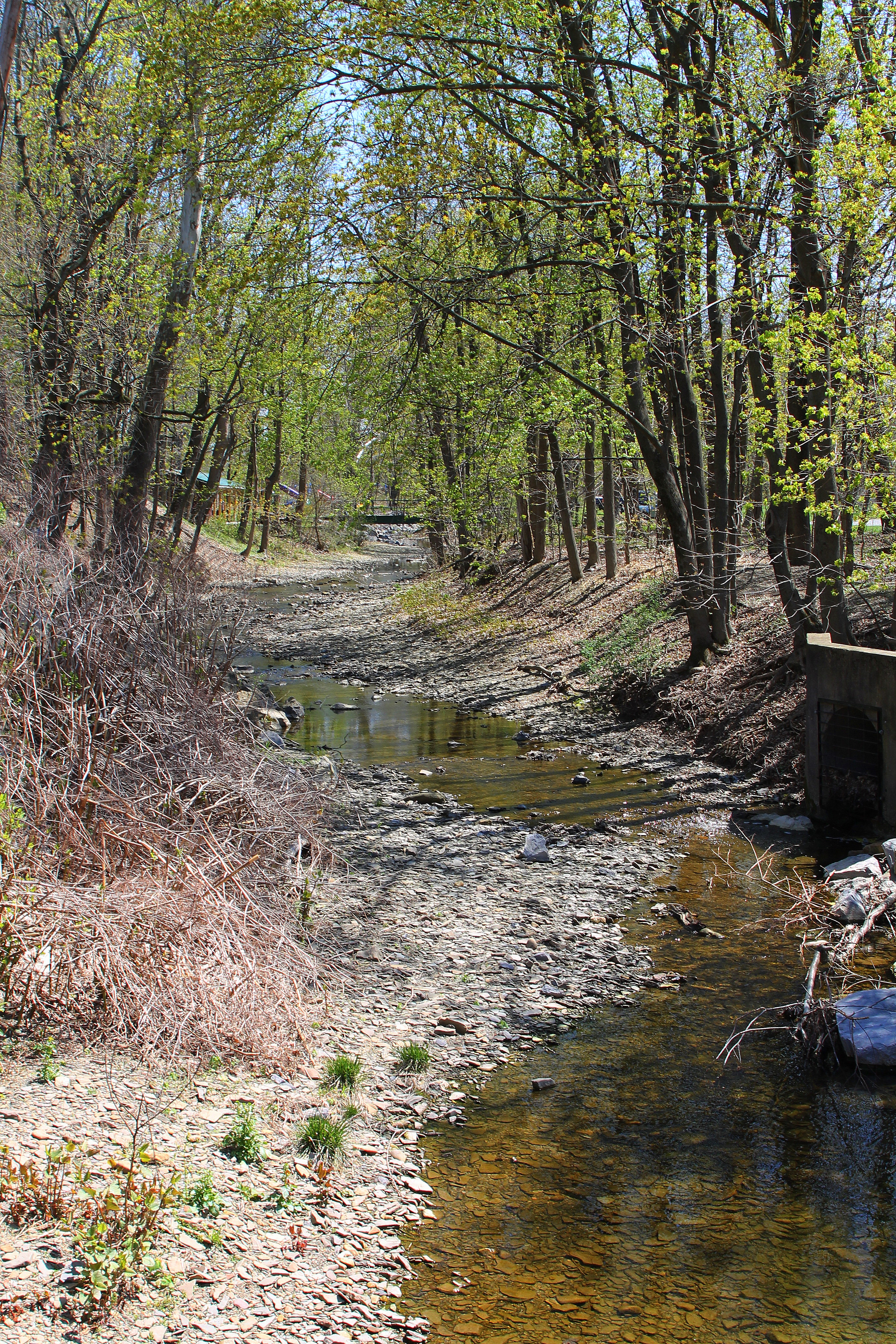
Glade Run looking upstream near Muncy

Glade Run begins in a valley in Lewis Township, Northumberland County. It flows northeast for several tenths of a mile before turning north and exiting Lewis Township and Northumberland County. Upon exiting Northumberland County, the stream enters Muncy Creek Township, Lycoming County. It continues flowing north for several tenths of a mile before receiving an unnamed tributary from the right and turning northwest. After a short distance, the stream turns north again for a few tenths of a mile, receiving an unnamed tributary from the left before turning west and receiving another unnamed tributary from the right. It then turns west-southwest for several tenths of a mile before turning west for a few tenths of a mile. The stream then receives an unnamed tributary from the left and turns north-northeast for several tenths of a mile. It then turns northwest for a few miles, leaving its valley, crossing Interstate 180, receiving two unnamed tributaries from the left, and entering Muncy. In Muncy, it flows north-northwest for several tenths of a mile before turning northwest and reentering Muncy Creek Township. It then gradually turns south-southwest. After several tenths of a mile, the stream turns northeast before turning west-southwest for a few tenths of a mile. It then reaches its confluence with the West Branch Susquehanna River.

Glade Run joins the West Branch Susquehanna River 27.66 miles (44.51 km) upriver of its mouth.

== Hydrology ==
Glade Run is not designated as an impaired waterbody.

The peak annual discharge of Glade Run at its mouth has a 10 percent chance of reaching 1,380 cubic feet per second (39 m^{3}/s). It has a 2 percent chance of reaching 2,880 cubic feet per second (82 m^{3}/s) and a 1 percent chance of reaching 3,900 cubic feet per second (110 m^{3}/s). The peak annual discharge has a 0.2 percent chance of reaching 7,050 cubic feet per second (200 m^{3}/s).

== Geography and geology ==
The elevation near the mouth of Glade Run is 476 feet (145 m) above sea level. The elevation of the stream's source is 889 feet (271 m) above sea level.

== Watershed and recreation ==
The watershed of Glade Run has an area of 7.63 square miles (19.8 km^{2}). The mouth of the stream is in the United States Geological Survey quadrangle of Muncy. However, its source is in the quadrangle of Hughesville. The mouth of the stream is located within 1 mile (1.6 km) of Muncy.

The designated use for Glade Run is aquatic life. A potential impoundment site on the stream was considered by the Lycoming County Planning Commission in 1969. It would have had an area of 135 acres (55 ha) if constructed.

Pennsylvania State Game Lands Number 325, which has an area of 591.819 acres (239.501 ha) is partially in the watershed of Glade Run, with its northern portion being located near the headwaters of one of the stream's unnamed tributaries.

== History ==
Glade Run was entered into the Geographic Names Information System on August 2, 1979. Its identifier in the Geographic Names Information System is 1175663. Glade Run received its name from the glades through which it flowed along its course.

An Indian path known as the Wyoming Path historically ran alongside Glade Run for part of its length. In 1771, shortly after John Scudder settled on Glade Run, his daughter Mary Scudder became the first white child to be born in what is now Lycoming County. In the early 1900s, a 3-million-gallon (11,356-cubic-meter) reservoir in the watershed of Glade Run was used as a water supply by the Muncy Water Supply Company for the borough of Muncy.

A concrete tee beam bridge carrying Pennsylvania Route 405 over Glade Run was built in Muncy in 1919. In 1920, a concrete slab bridge carrying Carpenter Street over the stream was built, also in Muncy, as was a concrete stringer/multi-beam or girder bridge carrying Green Street. A concrete slab bridge carrying Mechanic Street over Glade Run was built in 1938, again in Muncy. A concrete tee beam bridge carrying State Route 2061 was constructed across the stream in 1962 near Muncy. A prestressed box beam or girders bridge carrying State Route 2044 across the stream was built in 1974. A two-span concrete culvert bridge carrying State Route 2014 was built over Glade Run in 1978 100 feet (30 m) north of Muncy. In 1980, another concrete culvert bridge was built across the stream, this one 2 miles (3.2 km) southeast of Muncy and carrying State Route 2009.

== Biology ==
The drainage basin of Glade Run is designated as a Warmwater Fishery and a Migratory Fishery.

== See also ==
- Turkey Run (West Branch Susquehanna River), next tributary of the West Branch Susquehanna River going downriver
- Muncy Creek, next tributary of the West Branch Susquehanna River going upriver
- List of rivers of Pennsylvania
