= State Correctional Institution – Muncy =

Prison in Pennsylvania, United States

State Correctional Institution Muncy
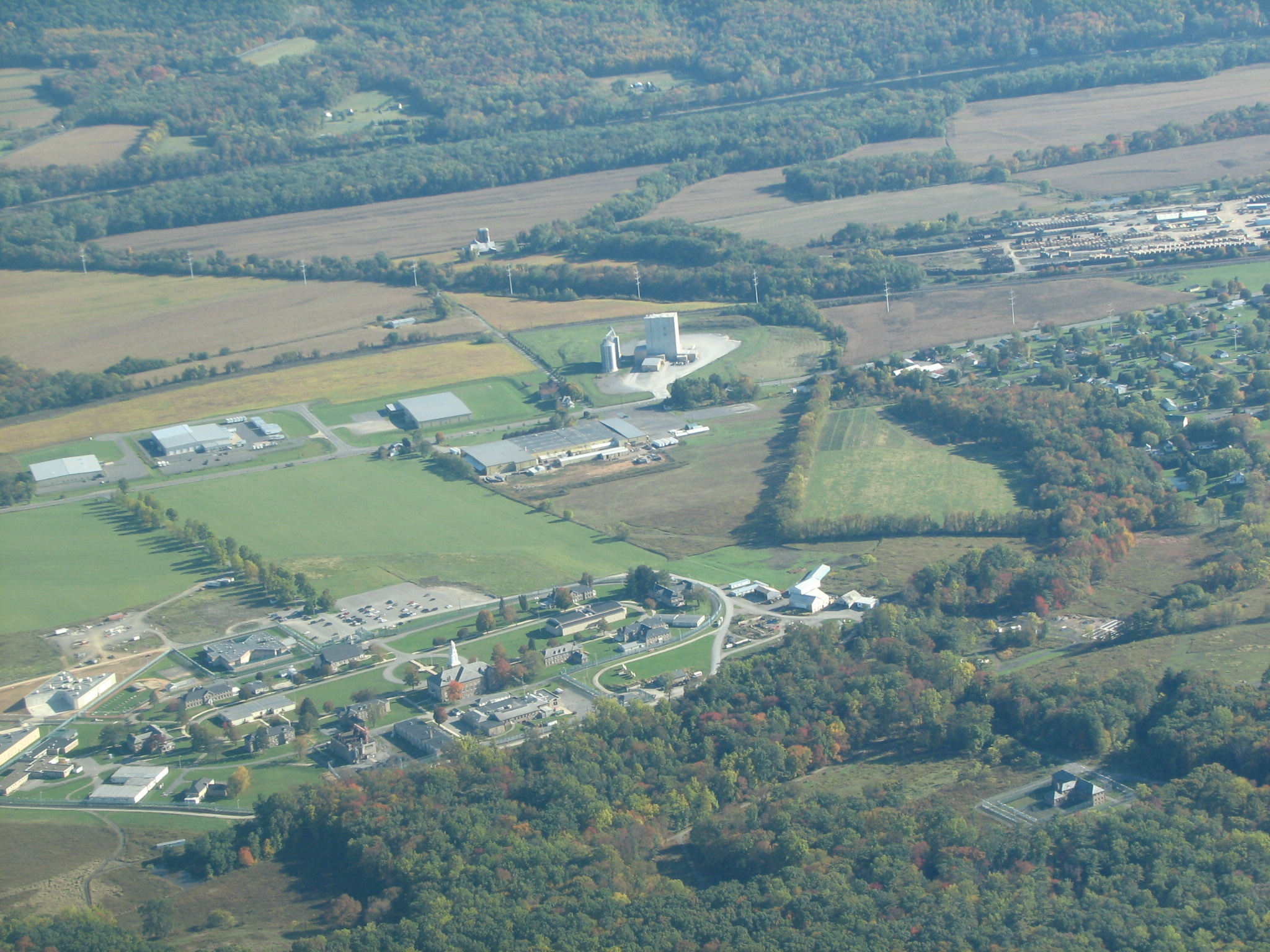
- Interactive map of State Correctional Institution Muncy
- Location: Clinton Township, Lycoming County, Pennsylvania; 41°12′11″N 76°49′29″W
- Security class: Close-security Maximum security
- Opened: 1953
- Managed by: Pennsylvania Department of Corrections
- Warden: Wendy Nicholas

State Correctional Institution – Muncy (SCI Muncy) is a Pennsylvania Department of Corrections prison for women in Clinton Township, Lycoming County, near Muncy. SCI Muncy, a medium/maximum security prison, houses Pennsylvania's death row for women.

In 1920, Muncy Industrial Home opened as a training school for imprisoned women between 16 and 30. In 1953 the industrial home became a part of the Bureau of Correction. The industrial home is now SCI Muncy.

SCI Muncy is the diagnostic center for female offenders in the Pennsylvania Department of Corrections. It also houses the Young Adult Offenders program. SCI Muncy has received some press coverage for its service dog training program.

As of 2019, the prison housed 1,472 prisoners, including 170 with life sentences. After inmate Shonda Walter's death sentence was reduced to life in 2016, there were no remaining women on Pennsylvania's death row. In December of 2025 SCI Muncy held 1,028 inmates against a public capacity of 1,642 individuals, or 62.6%.

== Operations ==
John Beauge of Pennlive.com reported that the prison "still resembles an early 1900s small college campus, albeit one with a few plain, modern buildings added over the years."

The restricted housing unit houses some women with disciplinary issues.

== Notable inmates ==
- Tabitha Buck, convicted in the murder of Laurie Show (released).
- Mary Jane Fonder, convicted in the murder of Rhonda Smith (deceased).
- Amber Meidinger, convicted in the murder of Jennifer Daugherty.
- Peggy Darlene Miller, convicted in the murder of Jennifer Daugherty.
- Sylvia Seegrist, convicted in the October 30, 1985, shooting at Springfield Mall in Springfield, Pennsylvania, that left three people dead.
- Sharon Wiggins, convicted of bank robbery and murder (deceased).
- Michelle Sue Tharp, convicted in the murder of her 7-year-old daughter. Tharp was initially sentenced to death; she was granted a resentencing in 2014 which was still pending as of 2024.
