= Montgomery, Pennsylvania =

Borough in Pennsylvania, US

- Borough
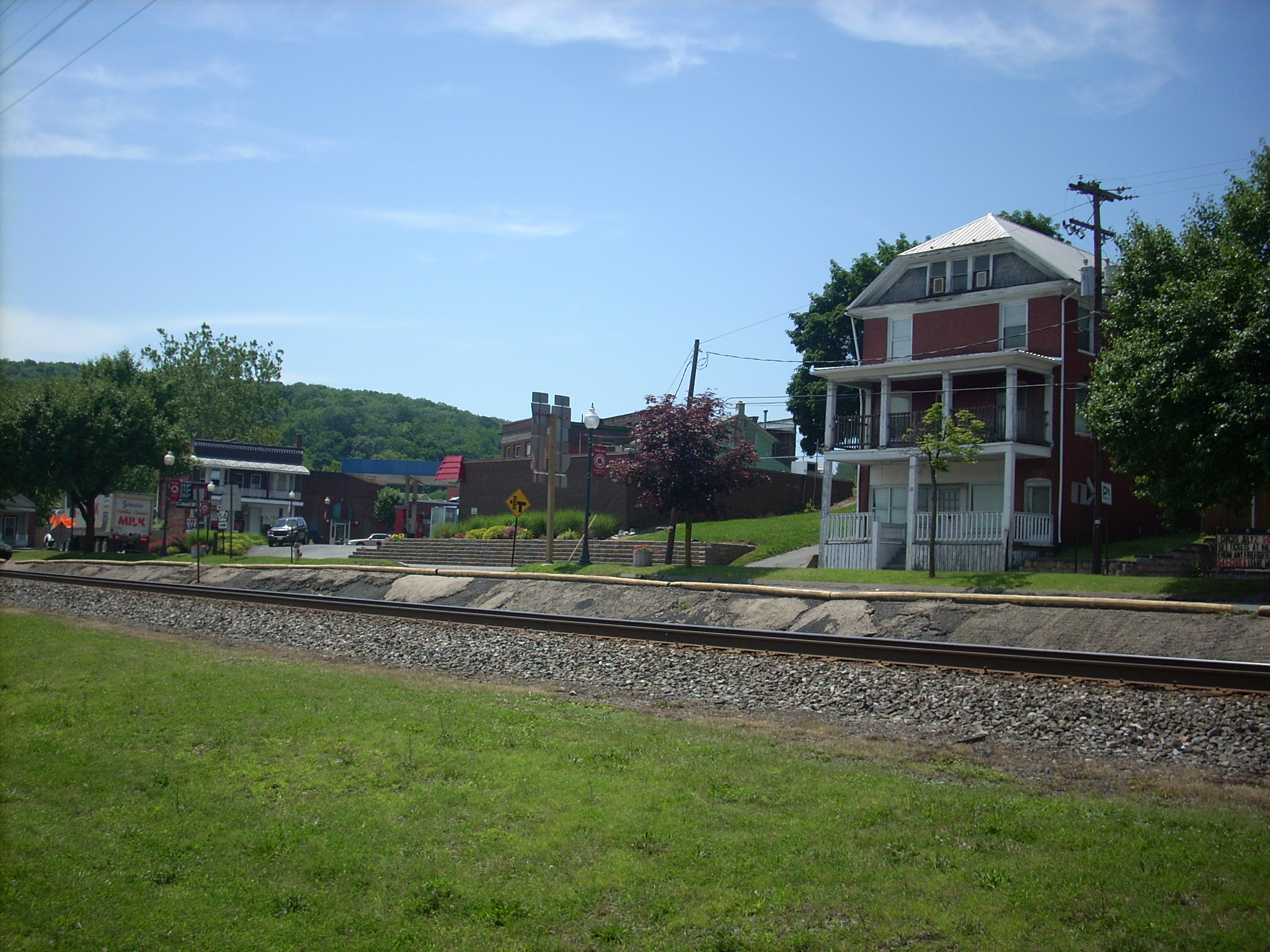
- Rail line in Montgomery

- Location of Montgomery in Lycoming County, Pennsylvania.
- Coordinates: 41°10′17″N 76°52′33″W
- Country: United States
- State: Pennsylvania
- County: Lycoming
- Settled: 1783
- Incorporated: 1887

Government
  - Type: Borough Council
  - Mayor: Kenny Bennett
  - Borough Manager: Donna J. Miller

Area
  - Total: 0.55 sq mi (1.43 km^{2})
  - Land: 0.55 sq mi (1.42 km^{2})
  - Water: 0.0039 sq mi (0.01 km^{2})
- Elevation: 509 ft (155 m)

Population (2020)
  - Total: 1,568
  - Density: 2,868.4/sq mi (1,107.51/km^{2})
- Time zone: UTC-5 (Eastern (EST))
  - Summer (DST): UTC-4 (EDT)
- ZIP code: 17752
- Area code: 570
- FIPS code: 42-50632
- GNIS feature ID: 1214023
- Website: www.montgomeryborough.org

Montgomery is a borough in Lycoming County, Pennsylvania, United States. The population was 1,570 at the 2020 census. It is part of the Williamsport, Pennsylvania Metropolitan Statistical Area.

== History ==
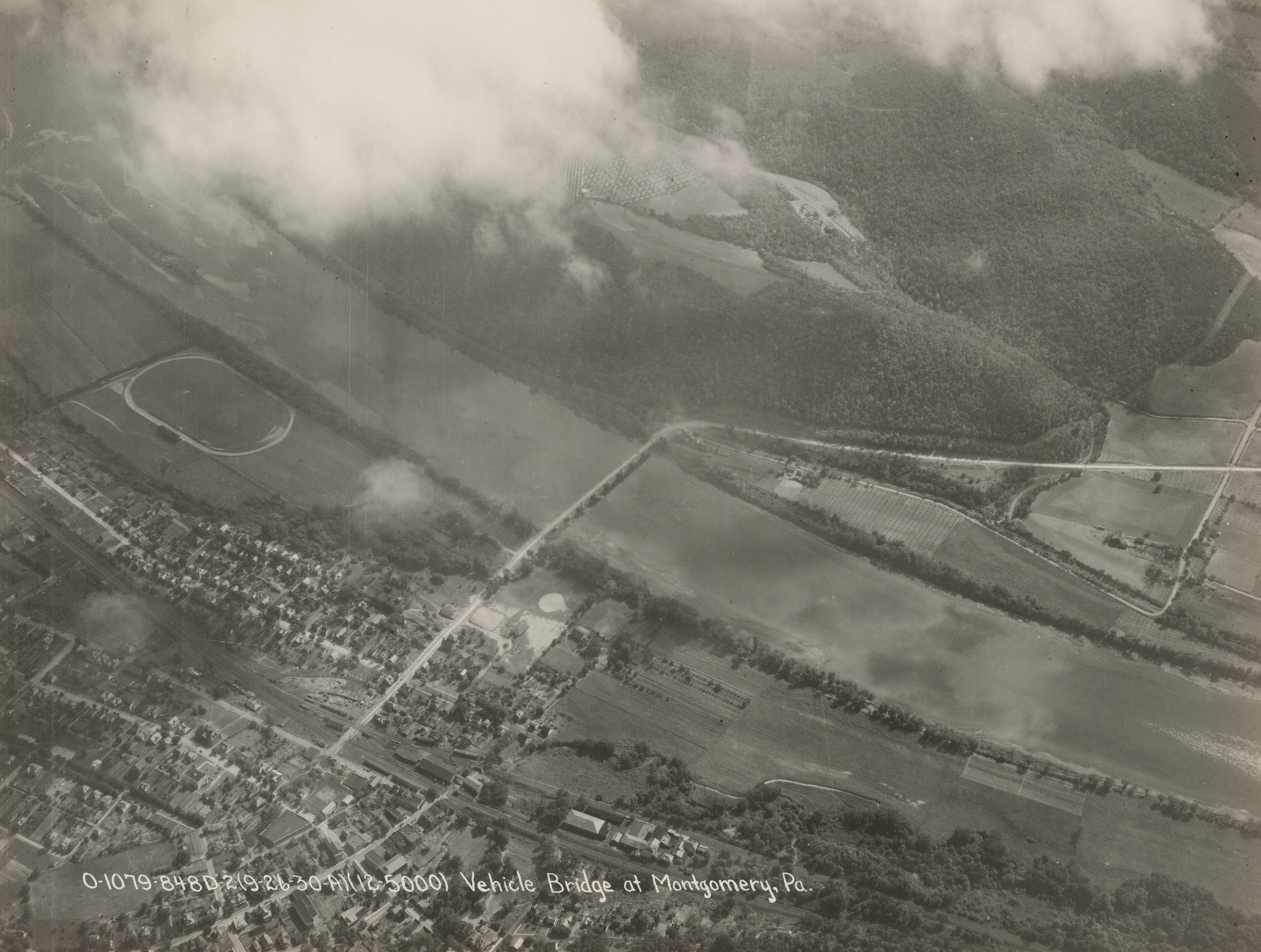
Montgomery in 1930

Montgomery was incorporated as a borough by the Court of Quarter Sessions of the Peace of Lycoming County, Pennsylvania on March 21, 1887, from part of Clinton Township. The history of the settlement of Montgomery begins in 1783 when John Lawson established a homestead there. Nicholas Shaffer built a gristmill in Montgomery in 1795. A sawmill and a wool carding mill were other early industries found on Black Hole Creek which flows through Montgomery.

P. M. Barber opened a distillery in 1859 and later a planing mill in 1869 on the site of the distillery which maintained sustained success. Barber with his partners, A.B. Henderson, Jesse Rank, and Nathan Fowler laid out a town around their mill in 1870. The town was further expanded by the success of Montgomery Machine Shops which started in 1873, under the supervision of Levi Houston, and built woodworking machinery sold to clients throughout the United States, Canada and Australia.

Montgomery was previously known as Black Hole for the creek that flows through it and the post office established in 1836 bearing that name. It was also known as Clinton Mills, again named for the post office. The name Montgomery stems from another name for the same post office, Montgomery Station.

== Geography ==
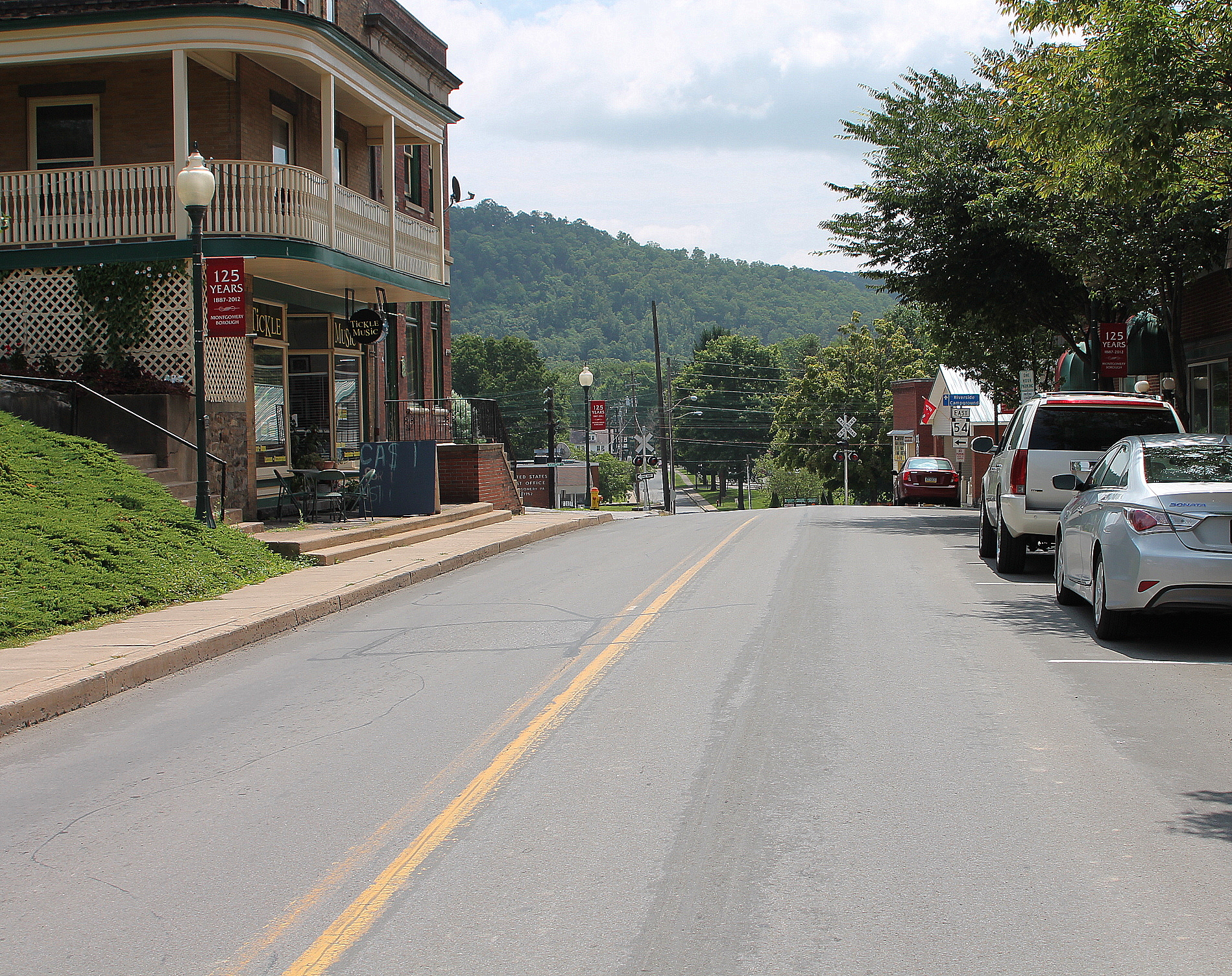
Pennsylvania Route 54 east in Montgomery, Pennsylvania

Montgomery is located at 41°10′17″N 76°52′33″W (41.171393, -76.875826). Montgomery lies along the West Branch of the Susquehanna River, approximately six miles to the southwest of the borough of Muncy, and eight and one-half miles southeast of the city of Williamsport. It borders Clinton Township on sides not bordered by the river. As the crow flies, Lycoming County is about 130 miles (209 km) northwest of Philadelphia and 165 miles (266 km) east-northeast of Pittsburgh.

According to the United States Census Bureau, the borough has a total area of 0.6 square miles (1.6 km^{2}), of which 0.5 square mile (1.4 km^{2}) is land and 0.04 square miles (0.10 km^{2}) (6.90%) is water.

== Demographics ==
Historical population
Census	Pop.	Note	%±
1880	414		—
1890	777		87.7%
1900	1,063		36.8%
1910	1,490		40.2%
1920	1,798		20.7%
1930	1,903		5.8%
1940	1,893		−0.5%
1950	2,166		14.4%
1960	2,150		−0.7%
1970	1,902		−11.5%
1980	1,653		−13.1%
1990	1,631		−1.3%
2000	1,695		3.9%
2010	1,579		−6.8%
2020	1,568		−0.7%
2021 (est.)	1,560	▼	−0.5%

As of the census of 2000, there were 1,695 people, 628 households, and 462 families residing in the borough. The population density was 3,117.2 inhabitants per square mile (1,203.6/km^{2}). There were 680 housing units at an average density of 1,250.6 per square mile (482.9/km^{2}). The racial makeup of the borough was 98.05% White, 0.53% African American, 0.35% Native American, 0.35% Asian, 0.29% from other races, and 0.41% from two or more races. Hispanic or Latino of any race were 1.12% of the population.

There were 628 households, out of which 39.3% had children under the age of 18 living with them, 54.5% were married couples living together, 15.1% had a female householder with no husband present, and 26.3% were non-families. 20.7% of all households were made up of individuals, and 8.4% had someone living alone who was 65 years of age or older. The average household size was 2.70 and the average family size was 3.12.

In the borough the population was spread out, with 31.2% under the age of 18, 8.0% from 18 to 24, 31.9% from 25 to 44, 18.1% from 45 to 64, and 10.9% who were 65 years of age or older. The median age was 32 years. For every 100 females, there were 87.7 males. For every 100 females age 18 and over, there were 86.3 males.

The median income for a household in the borough was $33,846, and the median income for a family was $38,641. Males had a median income of $27,500 versus $20,648 for females. The per capita income for the borough was $13,763. About 8.6% of families and 11.8% of the population were below the poverty line, including 18.0% of those under age 18 and 5.3% of those age 65 or over.

== Athletics ==
Montgomery's high school football team and that of its rival, the Muncy high school team, play annually for The Shoe. The trophy was created in 1961 from an old athletic shoe found in the Muncy High School locker room; the shoe has been bronzed and mounted on a wooden box. It was intended in 1961 that should one of the teams win the trophy five years in a row that team would keep the shoe permanently. However, when Montgomery achieved this goal in 1974, the team voted to continue the tradition. Muncy currently leads the series with 32 wins to Montgomery's 19.

In 2007, the Montgomery Lady Raiders won the District IV Championship in Class A Girls Basketball. This was the third time in four years that they went to the PIAA Class A Playoffs and the fourth time in school history that they won the championship. However, they were eliminated in the first round of states by Bishop O'Hara.

In 2007, the Montgomery Red Raiders won the PIAA District IV Championship in Class A Baseball. This was the first time in history that Montgomery won a district championship in Baseball. They were eliminated in the first round of states by the eventual state champion, Minersville.

In 2010, the Montgomery Lady Raiders softball team took second place in the PIAA State playoffs, losing to champion Chartiers-Houston. They finished with only 2 losses on the year.

In 2012, the Montgomery Red Raiders baseball team reached the championship game of the PIAA State playoffs. The Red Raiders lost the championship game to Bishop McCort of Johnstown.

Montgomery is also the home of the Montgomery Little League, a chartered member of Little League Baseball, and is billed as "The Second Oldest Little League In The World" until they merged with Muncy Little league in 2011, which ended the streak of 64 continuous years. They were represented in the 1947 Little League World Series, losing to the Lincoln Little League 7-2 and the Brandon Little League 14-2. Montgomery has not made it back to the World Series since.

== Notable people ==
- Mrs. Findley Braden (1858-1939), author, newspaper editor, and elocutionist
- D.J. Flick, a wide receiver for the Canadian Football League (CFL) Saskatchewan Roughriders, is from Montgomery. The Roughriders won the 2007 Grey Cup Championship, with Flick catching a touchdown pass.

== See also ==
- History of Lycoming County, Pennsylvania
