= Clinton Township, Lycoming County, Pennsylvania =

Township in Pennsylvania, US

- Township
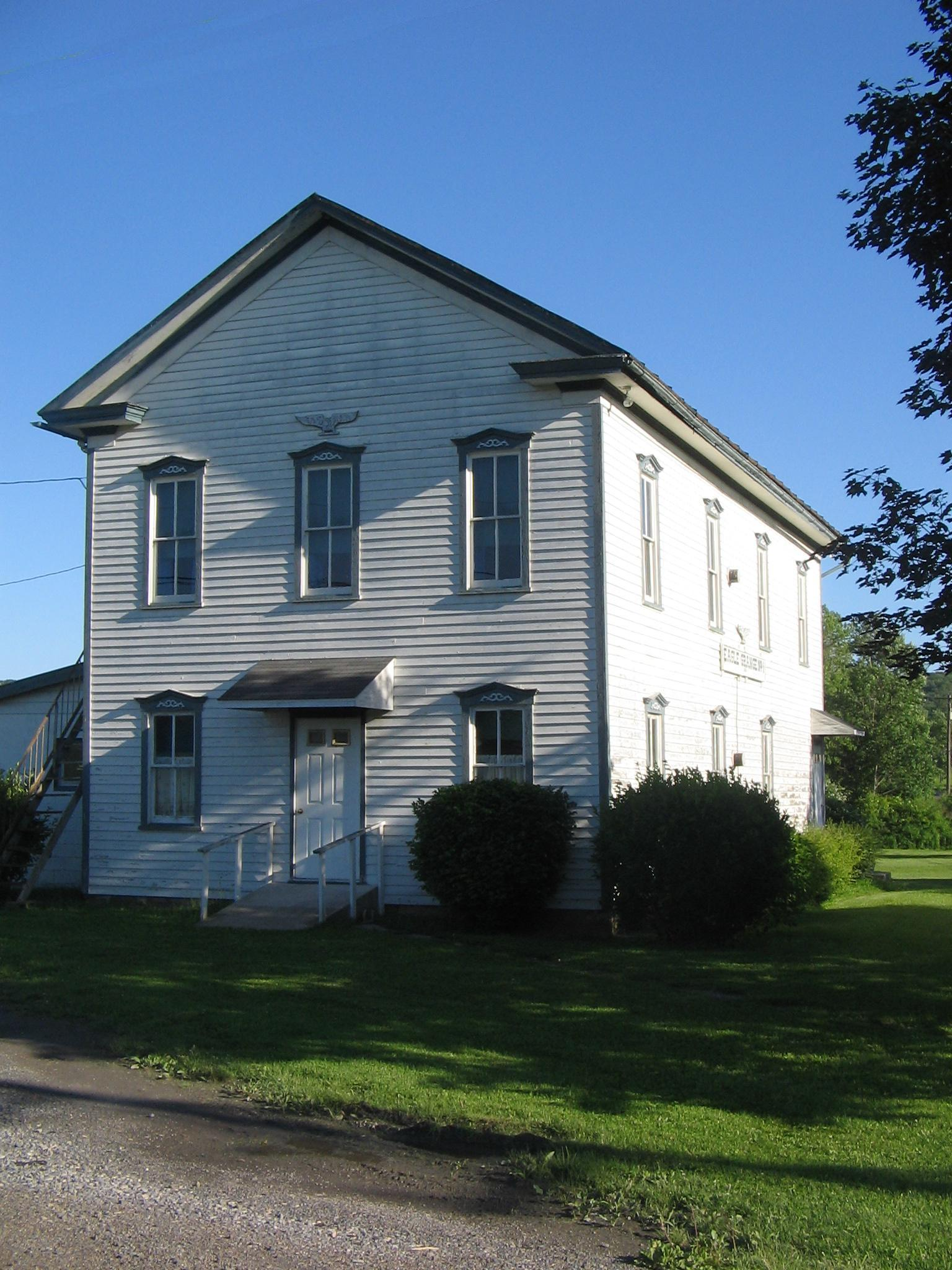
- Eagle Grange No. 1, built 1887, Clinton Township

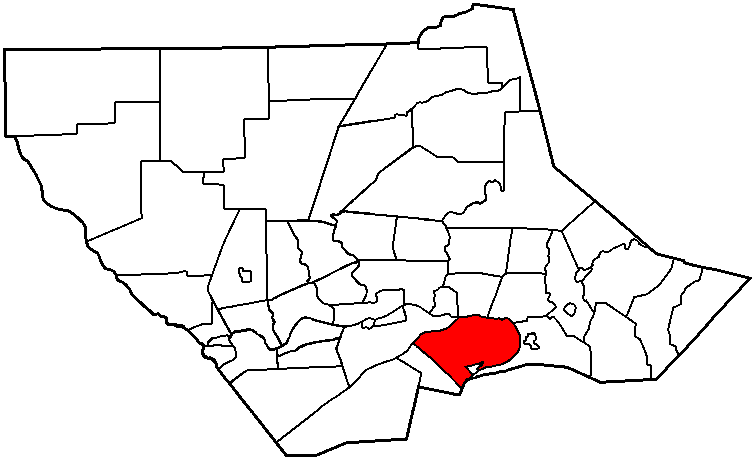
- Map of Lycoming County, Pennsylvania highlighting Clinton Township

- Map of Lycoming County, Pennsylvania
- Coordinates: 41°11′24″N 76°51′22″W
- Country: United States
- State: Pennsylvania
- County: Lycoming
- Settled: 1770s
- Formed: 1825

Area
  - Total: 28.34 sq mi (73.40 km^{2})
  - Land: 27.42 sq mi (71.02 km^{2})
  - Water: 0.92 sq mi (2.37 km^{2}) 2.85%
- Elevation: 666 ft (203 m)

Population (2020)
  - Total: 3,719 ▲
  - Estimate (2021): 3,705
  - Density: 133.2/sq mi (51.41/km^{2})
- Time zone: UTC-5 (Eastern Time Zone (North America))
  - Summer (DST): UTC-4 (EDT)
- FIPS code: 42-081-14336
- GNIS feature ID: 1216744
- Website: www.clintontwp.org

Clinton Township is a township in Lycoming County, Pennsylvania, United States. The population was 3,719 at the 2020 census, up from 3,708 in 2010. It is part of the Williamsport, Pennsylvania Metropolitan Statistical Area.

== History ==
Clinton Township was formed from part of Washington Township by the Court of Quarter Sessions of the Peace of Lycoming County during its December 1825 session. It was named for Governor DeWitt Clinton of New York.

The first permanent settlers to Clinton Township arrived just before the beginning of the American Revolution. They cleared the land that surrounds Black Hole Creek in the valley between Bald Eagle Mountain and Penny Hill. During the war, settlements throughout the Susquehanna valley were attacked by Loyalists and Native Americans allied with the British. After the Battle of Wyoming in the summer of 1778 (near what is now Wilkes-Barre) and smaller local attacks, the "Big Runaway" occurred throughout the West Branch Susquehanna valley. Settlers fled feared and actual attacks by the British and their allies. Homes and fields were abandoned, with livestock driven along and a few possessions floated on rafts on the river east to Muncy, then further south to Sunbury. The abandoned property was burnt by the attackers. Some settlers soon returned, only to flee again in the summer of 1779 in the "Little Runaway". Sullivan's Expedition helped stabilize the area and encouraged resettlement, which continued after the war.

Following the war the pioneers returned to Clinton Township and reestablished their homesteads. By this time most of the Native Americans had either been killed off or fled to the west. The settlers encountered some struggles over the years, most notably in the winter of 1787. This winter was especially harsh in Clinton Township. Nearly all the livestock was either frozen to death or died of starvation. The supplies of food stored after the harvest were quickly depleted and the people began to starve. Hunters struggled through the deep snow. Even those that were able to use snowshoes to walk on top of the snow struggled to find any game, which also struggled to survive the harsh winter. When the winter finally broke, the residents were able to harvest tremendous amounts of shad in Black Hole Creek and in the West Branch Susquehanna River with a seine that was delivered to them by the father-in-law of Major Ten Brook, Mr. Emmons. Mr. Emmons arrived from New Jersey with additional supplies including salt, wheat, corn, and garden seeds. He is credited with saving the lives of many of the early residents of Clinton Township. Emmons returned again in 1788 with another wagonload of supplies, but while camping he was killed by a tree that fell on the wagon where he was sleeping.

Eagle Grange No. 1 in Clinton Township was organized on March 4, 1871, by a group of rural farmers who had become concerned about the rising costs of farming in the post-Civil War economy. It was the first grange to be organized in Pennsylvania, two years before the formation of the Pennsylvania State Grange and four years after the National Grange of the Order of Patrons of Husbandry, better known as the National Grange, was founded in Fredonia, New York, by Oliver Hudson Kelley. The chief objectives of the Eagle Grange No. 1 were the establishment of a co-operative purchasing program for farmers, the lowering of railroad rates, and the establishment of rural free delivery by the United States Postal Service. The Grange was one of the first national organizations to give equal status to female members.

== Geography ==
Clinton Township is in southern Lycoming County and is bordered by the West Branch Susquehanna River to the north, east, and south, Brady Township to the southwest, and Armstrong Township to the northwest. Clinton Township borders the borough of Montgomery on three sides. U.S. Route 15 passes through the western side of the township, leading north 7 miles (11 km) to Williamsport, the county seat, and south 16 miles (26 km) to Lewisburg. Pennsylvania Route 54 has its western terminus at US 15 in Clinton Township, passes through Montgomery, and leads east 24 miles (39 km) to Danville. Pennsylvania Route 405 crosses the southeastern part of the township, starting in Montgomery and leading northeast 5.5 miles (8.9 km) across the West Branch to Muncy.

According to the United States Census Bureau, Clinton Township has a total area of 28.3 square miles (73.4 km^{2}), of which 27.4 square miles (71.0 km^{2}) are land and 0.93 square miles (2.4 km^{2}), or 3.23%, are water. The ridge of Bald Eagle Mountain occupies the northern part of the township, cresting above 2,000 feet (610 m) along the township's northwestern border, with Armstrong Township.

== Demographics ==
Historical population
Census	Pop.	Note	%±
2010	3,708		—
2020	3,719		0.3%
2021 (est.)	3,705		−0.4%
U.S. Decennial Census

As of the census of 2000, there were 3,947 people, 897 households, and 654 families residing in the township. The population density was 141.2 inhabitants per square mile (54.5/km^{2}). There were 948 housing units at an average density of 33.9 per square mile (13.1/km^{2}). The racial makeup of the township was 78.34% White, 19.31% African American, 0.18% Native American, 0.38% Asian, 1.52% from other races, and 0.28% from two or more races. Hispanic or Latino of any race were 2.46% of the population.

There were 897 households, out of which 27.4% had children under the age of 18 living with them, 60.5% were married couples living together, 8.2% had a female householder with no husband present, and 27.0% were non-families. 23.2% of all households were made up of individuals, and 12.0% had someone living alone who was 65 years of age or older. The average household size was 2.48 and the average family size was 2.90.

In the township the population was spread out, with 12.8% under the age of 18, 8.5% from 18 to 24, 45.2% from 25 to 44, 23.2% from 45 to 64, and 10.3% who were 65 years of age or older. The median age was 38 years. For every 100 females there were 95.8 males. For every 100 females age 18 and over, there were 95.8 males.

The median income for a household in the township was $35,231, and the median income for a family was $42,011. Males had a median income of $24,967 versus $17,643 for females. The per capita income for the township was $12,646. About 5.8% of families and 8.1% of the population were below the poverty line, including 12.2% of those under age 18 and 6.1% of those age 65 or over.

== Government and infrastructure ==
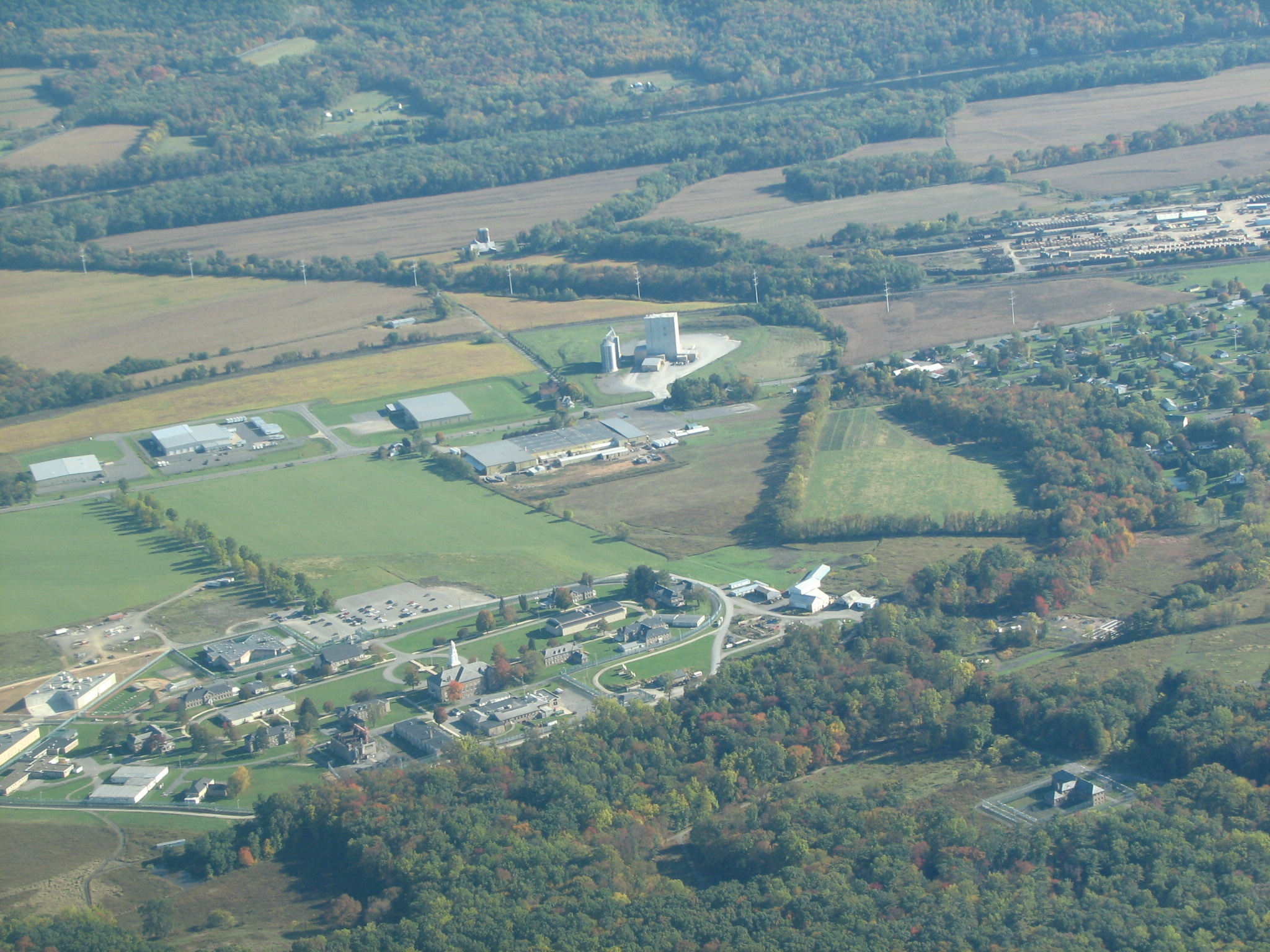
State Correctional Institution - Muncy

The Pennsylvania Department of Corrections State Correctional Institution – Muncy is in the eastern part of Clinton Township, north of PA 405. SCI Muncy has Pennsylvania's death row for women.
